= Paulus Mopeli Mokhachane =

19th-century Basotho leader in South Africa

- Successor: Ntsane
- Born: Paulus Mopeli; 1810; Free State
- Died: 1897 (aged 86–87); QwaQwa
- Burial: Lesotho

Paulus Mopeli Mokhachane (1810–1897) was an African military leader. He was half-brother to King Moshoeshoe I. He was instrumental during the wars between the Basotho and the Boers. He moved with his followers to Qwaqwa following disputes over land on the Warden line.

== Early life ==
Paulus Mopeli was the son of Mokhachane and half-brother to King Moshoeshoe I.

== Career ==
Mopeli occupied a trusted position within Moshoeshoe I’s inner circle. He was a warrior and contributed during the Basotho wars with the Boers and other African tribes. He stayed for several years at Thaba Bosiu and was influenced by the Paris Evangelical Missionary Society, particularly Eugene Casalis. In 1843, he converted to Christianity, travelling to Cape Town for a year of schooling. He later broke with the church over a quarrel between Batlokwa and the missionaries.

In 1848, he joined his people who had settled at Mabolela, near Ladybrand, where he quickly became an influential chief. He lived close to the ‘Warden boundary’ which was part of the Orange Free State. Disputes broke out the Boers and the Basotho over land and livestock. During the Free State–Basotho Wars, Mopeli was a warrior who supplied Moshoeshoe I with troops. On 14 June 1865, Mabolela was attacked by Commandant Johan Fick where about 50 Basotho were killed. Following the Seqiti War, Mopeli separated from Moshoeshoe I. This was because the Basotho were dispossessed of their land, after the signing of the Thaba Bosiu treaty.

Mopeli settled in Qwaqwa in 1866 where he lived in Monontsa near Witsie's Cave (Lekhalong la Witsie). Mopeli approached the Orange Free State Volksraad, led by President Johannes Brand, requesting permission to occupy the area, which had been abandoned by Chief Witsie. He was granted permission under the condition that he reimburse ranchers for the cattle that were taken by Chief Witsie. He was recognised as a Morena of the Bakwena. The agreement was signed on 3 April 1866 and it was known as “Khotso ya Mabele” or “The peace of millet”

== Significance ==
A monument of Mopeli was erected at Namahadi Village in Qwaqwa.

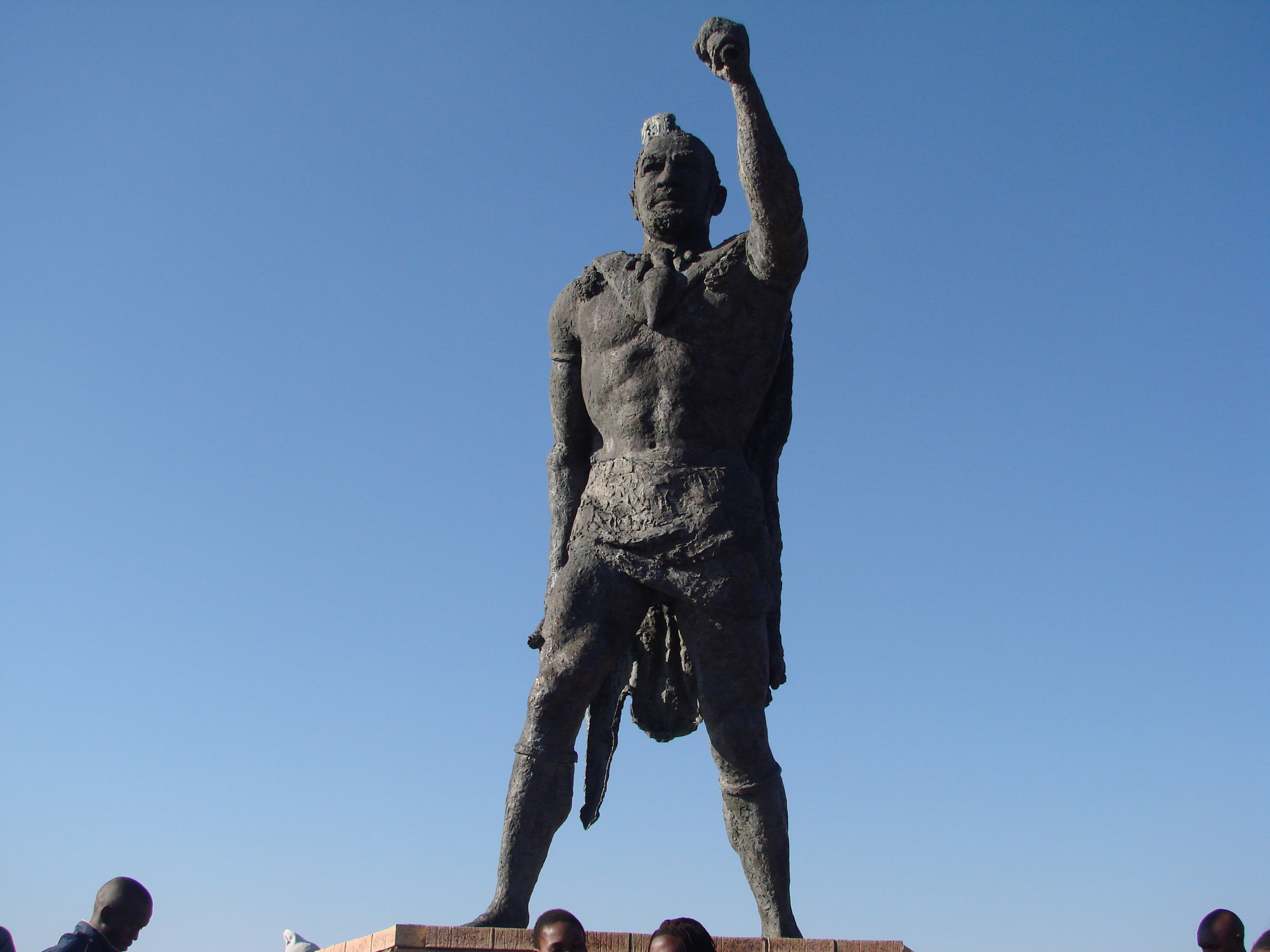
Statue of Paulus Mopeli Mokhachane in Namahadi Village in Qwaqwa

== See also ==
- Mfecane
