= Battle of Berea =

1852 battle between the Cape Colony and the Basuto people

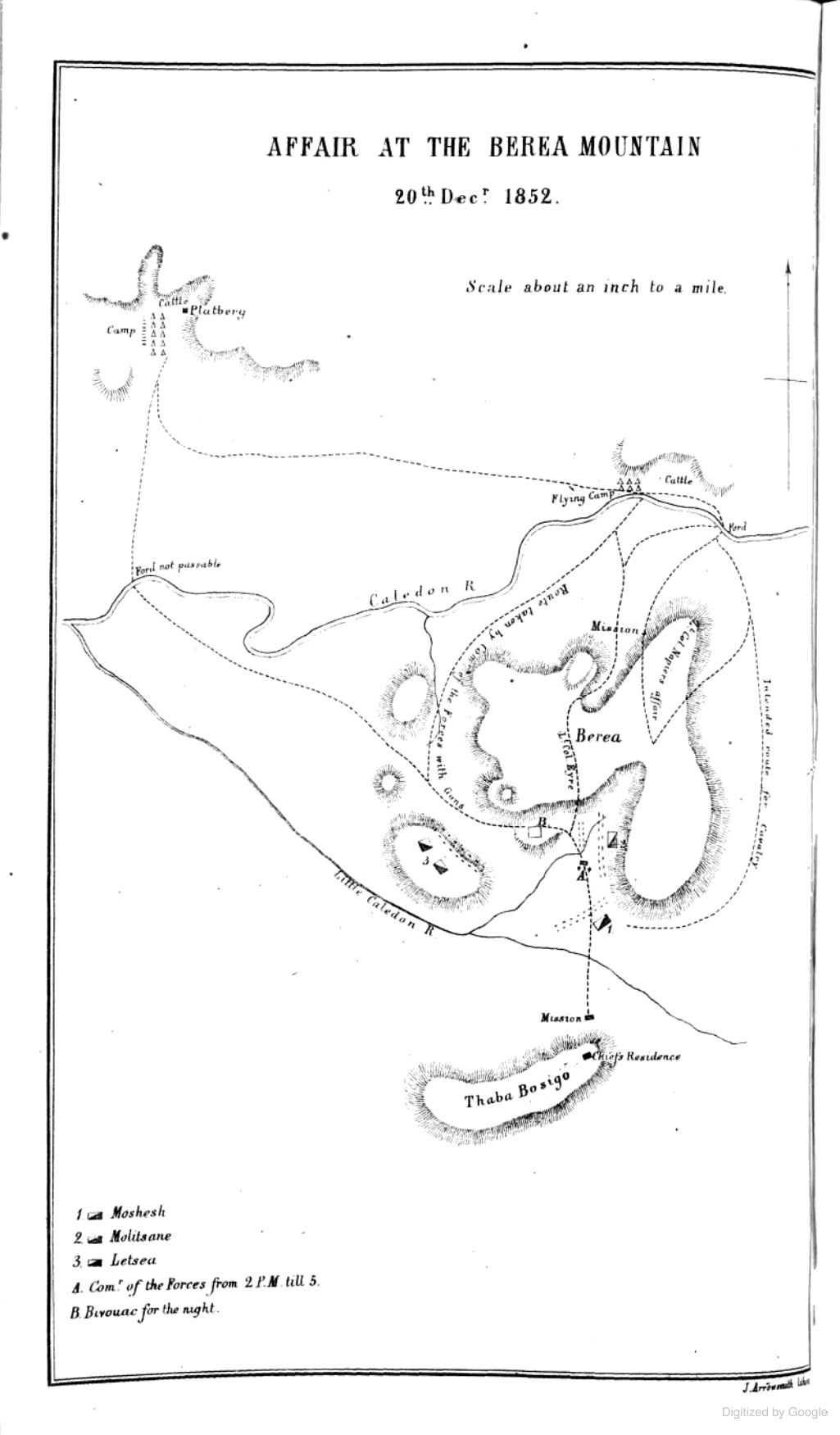
- Map of the Battle of Berea sent by Sir George Cathcart to London
Date	20 December 1852
Location	Berea, Basutoland (present day Lesotho) 29°19′S 27°36′E
Result	Inconclusive

Belligerents
(United Kingdom) British Empire	Basuto; Taung

Commanders and leaders
George Cathcart	Moshoeshoe I

Strength
c. 1,000	c. 7,000

Casualties and losses
38 killed 14 wounded	c. 50 killed and wounded
- Location of the battle in present day Lesotho

The Battle of Berea was a battle between British forces under Sir George Cathcart and Basuto-Taung forces under King Moshoeshoe I that took place on 20 December 1852. The battle began when British forces broke into three columns and crossed the Caledon River in southern Africa, with the goal of seizing Basuto cattle as a form of punishment for past Basuto cattle raiding.

A combination of stiff Basuto resistance, poor planning and miscoordination on the side of the British forces led to far fewer cattle being seized than originally planned. The British withdrew in order to regroup after suffering relatively high casualties. However a peace agreement was reached before the resumption of hostilities. The Basuto paid limited restitution, while agreeing to halt any further cattle raids against British subjects.

== Background ==
=== Foundation of the Basuto State ===
During the early 19th century, a diverse group of Sotho, Nguni and Tswana speaking tribes settled in the Caledon River region in southern Africa. The latter two formed the minority of the population and were gradually assimilated by the culturally dominant Sotho. King Moshoeshoe I united the various Sotho speaking chieftainships into a single nation during a period of political turbulence known as Lifaqane. By approximately 1828, Moshoeshoe's act had transformed the denigratory exonym of Sotho into the name of the nascent Basuto nation. In the region's African societies cattle raiding played a crucial societal role in increasing a chief's prestige. By stealing cattle from rival tribes and then redistributing it to his followers under the mafisa system, the chief retained its nominal ownership while strengthening his relationship with his subjects.

In the 1820s the Basuto faced a number of cattle raids from the Koranna, a group of Khoekhoe people who had migrated from the Cape following the European settlement of the region. It was during this time that they first encountered horses and guns in a combat setting. After a number of initial setbacks, the Basuto managed to either capture or acquire horses and guns of their own, and began stockpiling gunpowder. By 1843, Moshoeshoe had accumulated more horses and guns than any other chieftain in South Africa. Nevertheless, most of the guns in Basuto possession were outdated flintlocks, which had flooded the South African market after the introduction of percussion lock muskets.

=== Basuto-British relations ===
In 1843, Moshoeshoe signed a treaty with the governor of the British Cape Colony, Sir George Napier, whereby the British recognized the Basuto as their allies. The Basuto were tasked with countering Boer incursions into the Cape during the course of the Great Trek, receiving an annual grant of £75 in money or ammunition. In 1845, Napier's successor Sir Peregrine Maitland signed another treaty with Moshoeshoe which intended to settle territorial conflicts between the Boers and various African tribes on the Cape's northern border. Moshoeshoe reluctantly signed the treaty as it deprived the Basuto of both a tract of land and their annual grant. In 1848, the new Cape governor Sir Harry Smith pressured Moshoeshoe into signing an agreement whereby he recognized British paramount authority over the lands north of the Orange River; while retaining his traditional rights. The agreement also envisioned the creation of an alliance between the British and the Basuto. A series of similar ambiguously worded treaties with local African tribes effectively established the Orange River Sovereignty.

In the north-east, the Basuto and their Taung allies regularly engaged in tit for tat cattle raids against their old enemies the Batlakoa and the Koranna. The British Resident in the Orange River Sovereignty, Major Henry Douglas Warden, believed that the Basuto were more to blame for the continuous inter tribal warfare in the region. In 1849, Warden began delineating borders between the various tribes in the north-east frontier, ignoring Moshoeshoe's long standing claims to several territories in the process. Moshoeshoe believed that the British had failed to protect him against Batlakoa and Boer encroachment, while many of his subjects accused him of cowardice in the face of British oppression. On 25 June 1851, Warden demanded that the Basuto restore 6,000 head of cattle and 300 horses to the victims of their past cattle raids. Warden had assembled a mixed force of British, Boer and African troops numbering approximately 2,500 men at Platberg. On 28 June, Warden moved his force against the Taung in an effort to seize stolen cattle. On 30 June, Warden's force was defeated by a Basuto-Taung army at the Battle of Viervoet.

In October Moshoeshoe wrote to both Smith and Warden, explaining that he had acted in self-defense and intended to maintain cordial relations with the British. In February 1852, assistant commissioner William Hogge conceded that the Cape government had made mistakes in their treatment of the Basuto. Hogge agreed to redraw the boundaries in south-western Basutoland and to cease colonial interference in inter-tribal conflicts. Hogge insisted that the Basuto restore the cattle and horses they had stolen from the Rolong and the Boer settlers since September 1850 within a span of two weeks. Moshoeshoe restored four hundred cattle and horses by 20 March, however he refused to proceed with the process after he realized that the restoration of Basuto lands was conditional upon the return of the cattle. The Basuto were determined to fight rather than give away their cattle, while Smith's newly appointed replacement, Major-General Sir George Cathcart, was waiting for the hostilities with the Xhosa to wane before dealing with the Basuto.

== Prelude ==
Having largely suppressed Xhosa opposition in the east, in late November 1852 Cathcart led an army numbering some 2,500 men from Burgersdorp northwards. The force consisted of infantry detachments of the 2nd (The Queen's Royal) Regiment of Foot, the 43rd (Monmouthshire) Regiment of Foot, the 73rd (Perthshire) Regiment of Foot, the 74th (Highland) Regiment of Foot and the 1st Battalion of The Rifle Brigade. Also included were elements of the Cape Mounted Rifles (CMR) and the 12th Royal Lancers as well as two six-pounder field guns, two twelve-pounder howitzers and Congreve rockets belonging to the Royal Artillery and Royal Sappers and Miners.

On 13 November, Cathcart convened a meeting in Platberg with the intention of determining the number of cattle the Basuto needed to restore. The committee decided that the Basuto were to commit 10,000 cattle and 1,000 horses within three days. In the event of Basuto resistance, Cathcart warned that he would seize thrice the original number. Two days later, Moshoeshoe visited Cathcart's camp and requested additional time to collect the cattle. Cathcart rebuffed Moshoeshoe and threatened to collect the cattle by force. Moshoeshoe warned that "a dog when beaten would show its teeth". Cathcart remained sure that the Basuto would offer no resistance and left more than half his army at the Platberg camp. Moshoeshoe convened a pitso (formal assembly) at Thaba Bosiu imploring his followers to collect as many cattle as they could. By 18 November, 3,500 cattle had been collected and Basuto envoys pleaded for more time. The British remained adamant and when the Basuto failed to deliver additional cattle the following day; Cathcart established a camp on the right bank of the Caledon (modern day Cathcart's Drift) 12 miles (19 km) north-west of Thaba Bosiu. Moshoeshoe's brother Mopeli visited Cathcart at his new camp and agreed to lead the British to Thaba Bosiu the following day in order to continue peaceful negotiations.

After Mopeli's departure, Cathcart changed his mind and ordered his troops to march on Thaba Bosiu at 4 a.m. on 20 December. The fourth company of the 74th Regiment was tasked with guarding the camp on the Caledon while the rest of the force was divided into three columns. The first column under Lieutenant-Colonel G. Napier, numbering 119 men of the CMR and 114 of the 12th Lancers, was to move around the Berea plateau that separated the camp from Thaba Bosiu from the north, rounding up any cattle his soldiers came across. Unbeknownst to the British the plateau extended for many miles to the north and thus Napier would have to inevitably cross the mountain in order to carry out his task in time. The central column was commanded by Lieutenant-Colonel William Eyre and had a strength of approximately 400 men, most of whom were infantry. It was supported by small detachments of Lancers and CMR cavalry, mounted Mfengu herdsmen and artillerymen who carried two Congreve rockets on mules. It was tasked with traversing the plateau and then driving the cattle through passes on its southern side. The third column was personally commanded by Cathcart. It included three companies of the 43rd Regiment, two six-pounder guns with their crews and a small mixed cavalry detachment, totaling under 400 men. Cathcart's column was to advance along the western side of Berea before converging with the other columns in front of the mountain. The pincer movement of Napier's and Cathcart's columns was to prevent the Basuto from driving their cattle away.

== Battle ==
At dawn on 20 December, the British crossed the Caledon and began their push on Thaba Bosiu. The Basuto were shocked by the British advance and believed that they had been deliberately misled by Cathcart. The herds around Thaba Bosiu were driven away, guarded by the tribe's infantry; while the cavalry regiments prepared for battle. Napier's column crossed the Caledon, advancing within sight of the peak of Berea by 8 a.m. After taking a short stop at a spring, they began gathering the large herds of cattle which were grazing on the slopes of the mountain. In the meantime, Moshoeshoe's son Molapo had concealed 700 cavalry (including allied Taung) and several hundred infantry above the Berea Mission Station. At midday Napier's force began driving 4,000 captured cattle and 55 horses along the road to the Caledon camp. It was then that Molapo's infantry attacked the column's rear guard, while the cavalry charged upon the Lancers. A group of 30 Lancers under Major Tottenham, rode alongside a dried river which unbeknownst to them ended in a stony ridge. They were cornered there by the Basuto cavalry who killed 27 and injured one with their battle axes and assegais. A separate group of CMR riders were isolated near the mission station and five were shot dead. Napier rallied his soldiers and repelled Molapo's warriors. Two further Basuto attacks were driven off by a charge of the Lancers and long range rifle fire from a company of the 74th Regiment respectively. Napier's column then returned to the Caledon camp.

Cathcart's and Eyre's columns set off at 3 a.m., moving jointly downstream. They were fired upon from a small hill in front of Berea, but took no casualties. They reached the village of Khoabane 1.5 miles (2.4 km) west of the Berea Mission Station at 6 a.m. There they separated, Cathcart moved to the west in order to circumvent the mountain, while Eyre continued moving forward. Eyre ordered the Rifle Brigade and the light company of the 73rd Regiment to capture a position above Khoabane. Moving across difficult terrain the British exchanged fire with their adversaries. One British soldier was killed, along with several Basuto warriors and a few civilian women who were shot by accident. Further clashes took place at a village on a summit, which the British set ablaze. Eyre's column had sighted a herd of 30,000 cattle, however they struggled to take control of the animals since most of them were on foot. By 1 p.m., they had seized only 1,500 animals. At the same time, they were suddenly struck by 300 of Molapo's horsemen who were armed with the lances belonging to the British soldiers they had killed and wearing their caps. Eyre's hat was knocked down by a knobkerrie. The British lost four soldiers killed and 10 wounded in the ensuing fighting, while captured Captain Walter Faunce was executed in retaliation for the earlier killing of civilians. The Basuto were eventually driven off by rifle and rocket fire, withdrawing at 4 p.m., after the outbreak of heavy rainfall.

Cathcart's column had rounded the south-western corner of Berea. Howitzer fire had put groups of mounted Basuto skirmishers to flight enabling the British to take over a knoll overlooking the Phuthiatsana valley 3 kilometres (1.9 mi) from Thaba Bosiu at midday. The Basuto began gradually massing in front and to the right of their opponents, circling around the British position, occasionally closing in to musket range before being driven away by enemy fire. Their strength grew to 6,000 cavalry led by Moshoeshoe and his sons Letsie, Sekhonyana and Masopha. Eyre's column departed from Berea and joined Cathcart at 5 p.m. just as the rainstorm ended. The combined British force pulled back 2 kilometres (1.2 mi) down the road, securing the cattle Eyre had captured at a nearby kraal. The Basuto intensified their skirmishing, with Masopha, Sekhonyana and Moshoeshoe's brother Lelosa leading cavalry charges. The British responded with rifle fire and canister shot salvos. The Basuto were discouraged by the high degree of discipline of the British, after seeing them roasting meat within their encampment. They returned to Thaba Bosiu at around 8 p.m. Cathcart remained vigilant, forbidding his men from unrolling their blankets.

== Aftermath ==
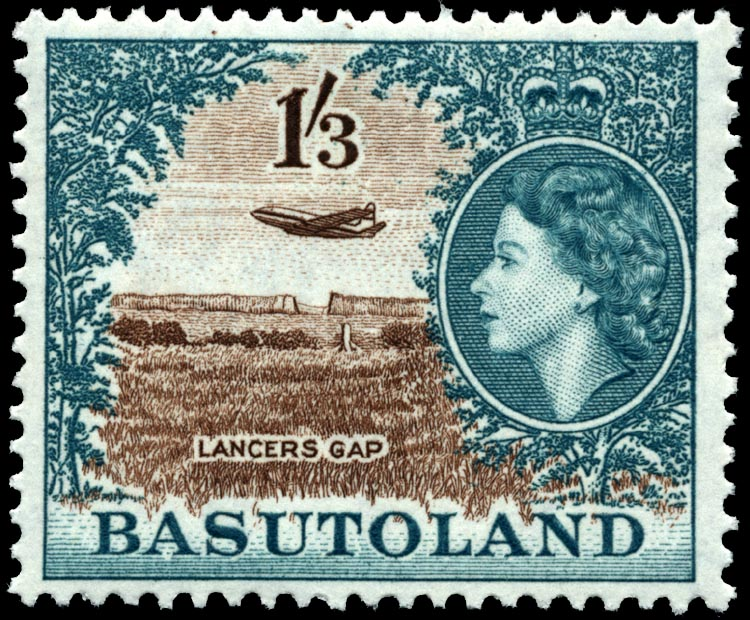
Lancers Gap as depicted on a British colonial stamp

The British had rounded up over 5,000 head of cattle along with numerous other animals. The Basuto thought their cause to be lost, Letsie urged his father to sue for peace, while others suggested a retreat to the Maloti Mountains. Cathcart likewise did not expect the Basuto to showcase such determined resistance. His force was short on ammunition and his soldiers were tired. A miscommunication between the major-general and his officers led to the failure of the British plan to conduct a general assault, with conflicting reports being issued as to the original plan of the operation. The decision was taken to fall back to the Caledon camp and resume the campaign at a later date. At midnight Moshoeshoe composed a letter to Cathcart which was translated into English by French missionary Eugène Casalis in which he pleaded for peace. He also ordered his troops to make no further attacks. The following morning, the Basuto found that the British had already departed from Berea, before the letter could be dispatched.

A few hours after the British returned to their Caledon camp, a Basuto messenger delivered the letter under a flag of truce. Cathcart believed that any further assault on Thaba Bosiu may have led to the outbreak of another large scale conflict, which he was unwilling to pursue. He therefore ignored his officers' arguments and accepted a truce, inviting Moshoeshoe to Platberg. The captured herds and the wounded were sent to Bloemfontein, while the British army began to depart Basutoland on 24 December. The Basuto did not allow their chief to travel and thus Thaba Bosiu was visited by assistant commissioner Charles Owen. Masopha and Sekhonyana assisted Owen in recovering and burying the bodies of 20 British soldiers. The rest of the bodies were likely used in the preparation of traditional medicine. The Basuto paid a restitution of 3,500 head of cattle, 1,500 of which were distributed to tribes they had raided. The rest were sold with the proceeds going to Boer farmers. The value of the sold cattle was far lower than the £20,000 goal set by Cathcart, who opted to write off any outstanding claims.

The Basuto estimated their losses to be 20 killed and 20 injured, while Cathcart reported enemy probable losses to be between 500 and 600 men. Modern estimates put Basuto casualties at fewer than 50. British casualties amounted to 38 killed and 14 wounded. In 1855, the surviving British participants of the Battle of Berea received the South African General Service Medal which bore the date 1853. The Basuto were so impressed by the performance of the British soldiers that the battle is popularly remembered by them as Ntoa ea Masole (Battle of the Soldiers). Moshoeshoe was now able to convince his followers to completely stop raiding loyalist Boer farmers and trade between the two nations was restored. Anglo-Sotho relations remained amicable, enabling the Basuto to avoid destruction during the Free State–Basotho Wars in the 1860s by becoming a British dominion.

One of the edges of the Berea plateau came to be known as the Lancers Gap, according to an apocryphal story in which the 12th Lancers rode to their death off the cliff at that point.
