= Masopha =

Lesotho chief

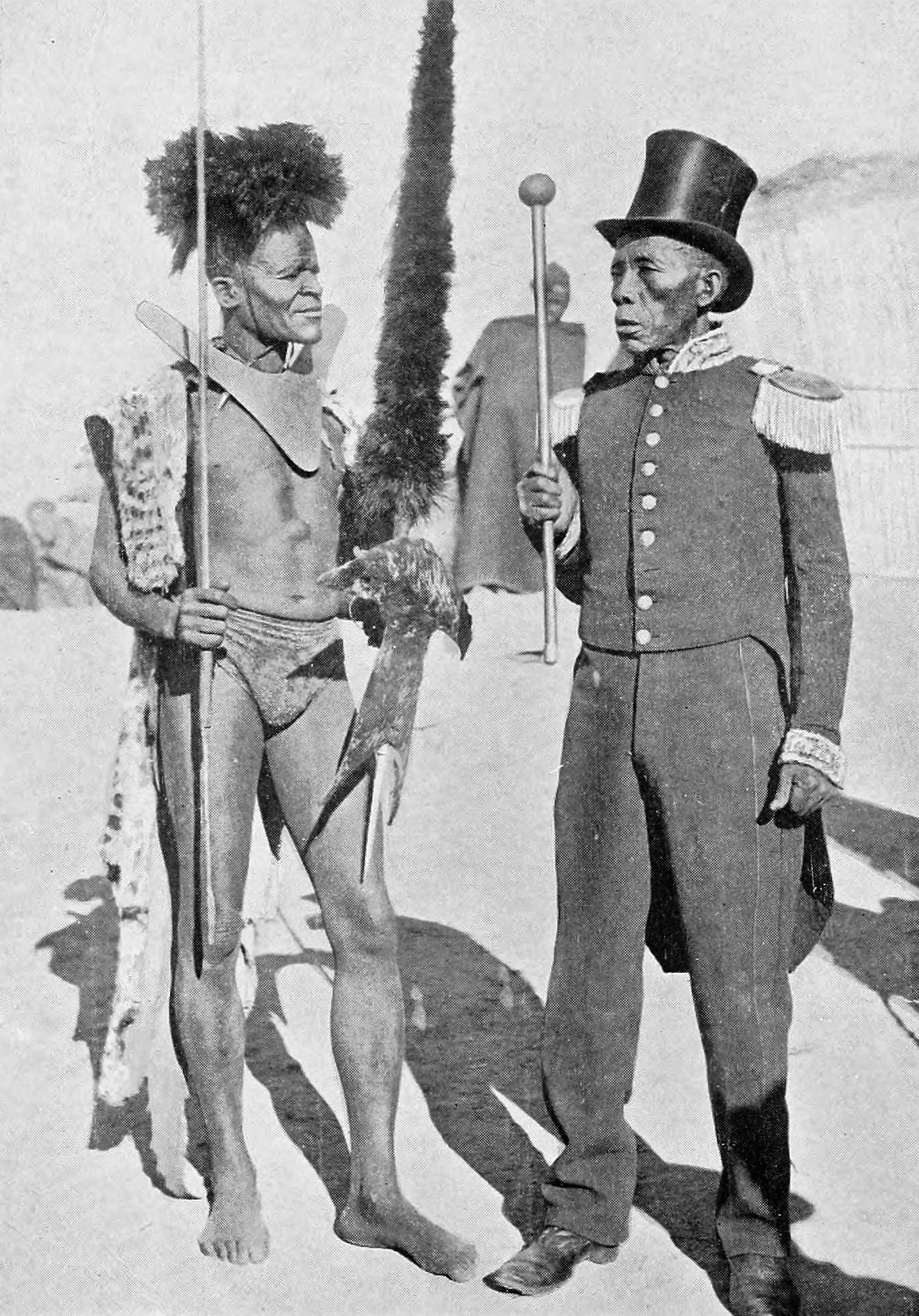
- Masopha (right) with his standard-bearer
- Born: c. 1820
- Died: July 1898
- House: House of Moshoeshoe
- Father: Moshoeshoe I
- Mother: ’MaMohato

Masopha (c. 1820 – July 1898) was a Basuto chief. He was the third son of Basuto paramount chief Moshoeshoe I. During his youth he fought in numerous conflicts against neighboring tribes and European colonists. According to Basuto praise-poems he was known for his bravery. Following the incorporation of Basutoland into the Cape Colony, Masopha resisted the imposition of colonial rule and emerged as one of the most powerful Basuto chiefs.

In 1880, he became one of the leaders of Basuto resistance to the Cape in the Basuto Gun War. The war resulted in a peace treaty favoring the Basuto. Following the end of the war he came into conflict with his nephew and heir apparent Lerotholi. The two clashed in a brief civil war in January 1898. Masopha was defeated in July 1898, losing his title of district chief. The Basuto continue to honor Masopha during their initiation rituals.

== Early life and family ==
Masopha Moshoeshoe (also spelled Masuphag or Masopa) was born c. 1820. He was the third son of the paramount chief of the Basuto people Moshoeshoe I and his senior wife 'MaMohato. It was said that he resembled his father the most in appearance. During the early 19th century, southern Africa faced a period of significant political instability known as Lifaqane. Moshoeshoe had united various Sotho speaking chieftainships into the Basuto nation, settling in the Caledon River region. In 1833, missionaries from the Paris Evangelical Missionary Society (PEMS) began setting their outposts in Basuto lands following Moshoeshoe's invitation.

Masopha began studying under the tutelage of the missionaries and was baptized in 1841, taking the name David. In 1845, he departed for Cape Town with his brothers Letsie and Morapo to further his education. Masopha spent one year in Cape Town, studying English under reverend Thomas Arbousset and familiarizing himself with white society. Either in 1845 or 1848, Masopha abandoned Christianity over PEMS's opposition towards the war between the Basuto and the Batlokoa. Throughout his life he maintained good relations with the missionaries, but continued to practice several Basuto customs that they disapproved of. After the death of his younger brother Majara in 1859, he took Majara's wives into leviratic marriage. By the 1870s Masopha had approximately 50 wives, akin to other major chiefs of the period. Masopha had multiple children from his marriages. In 1886, Masopha's eldest son Lepogo died from alcoholism. Like most other Basuto chiefs, Masopha was also reported to drink heavily.

== Rise to prominence ==
=== Early campaigns ===
Since the 1820s, the Basuto frequently engaged in warfare with neighboring tribes and European settlements, which took the form of cattle raids and the occasional burning of villages. To that end Moshoeshoe had accumulated more horses and guns than any other chieftain in South Africa. Masopha distinguished himself as a warrior and was considered the most courageous of Moshoeshoe's sons. In 1852, Masopha took part in the Battle of Berea where the Basuto fought against a British punitive expedition. Masopha also participated in raids against white settlers in Bloemfontein. In 1853, Masopha participated in a campaign against Batlakoa chief Kgosi Sekonyela, successfully storming his stronghold Marabeng. In 1855, he established a village known as Masopha's Mile located 1 mile (1.6 km) from the Thupa Kubu stream on the Berea plateau. There he amassed a considerable following.

=== Free State Wars and annexation ===
In 1858, war broke out between the Basuto and the Boer Orange Free State. On 12 April 1858, Masopha and other chiefs held the Boers at bay on the Caledon River. Masopha led part of the Basuto army and participated in the peace negotiations that followed. In 1865, hostilities between the two sides resumed, and Masopha captured numerous heads of cattle from the Boers and their allies. His regiments raided the Griqua village of Platberg, killing all the men and enslaving all the women. Masopha's troops were heavily defeated by the Boers while trying to defend Masopha's Mile, forcing him to abandon it. He later joined the defense of the Thaba Bosiu stronghold, acting as Moshoeshoe's main military advisor. By 1866, the tide of war had turned against the Basuto. Fearing that the Basuto were facing annihilation, Moshoeshoe, his sons and local missionaries began appealing to British High Commissioner for Southern Africa Sir Philip Wodehouse and the Colony of Natal for protection. Judging the expansion of the Free State to be contrary to British geopolitical interests, Wodehouse proclaimed Basutoland to be a royal dominion on 12 March 1868.

Following Moshoeshoe's death in 1870, he was succeeded by Letsie I. It is believed that Masopha was planning to establish an independent kingdom upon his father's death but was prevented from doing so due to the British annexation. Masopha remained insubordinate to colonial rule by failing to enforce colonial legislation and resisting taxation. The Basuto gradually became more apprehensive towards the colonial authorities due to the erosion of traditional chiefly authority. In 1879, the Cape Colony prime minister Sir Gordon Sprigg decided to extend the Peace Preservation Act to Basutoland. Under its terms the colony would confiscate the firearms of Basutoland's African population in exchange for monetary compensation. The majority of the Basuto saw the law as unacceptable due to the gun's high symbolic and monetary value in local society.

The Cape authorities struggled to enforce the disarmament law. During a pitso (formal assembly) convened on 3 July 1879, Masopha and his nephew chief Joel Molapo called for armed resistance against the law's implementation. Masopha began to fortify Thaba Bosiu, while the supporters of the rebel chiefs began ignoring orders from the local magistrates. Anarchy broke out, as rebels began attacking loyalists who had surrendered their weapons and seized loyalist property. Sprigg pressured Letsie I into arresting Masopha. Letsie I believed that most of his nation had rallied behind Masopha and this was therefore unfeasible. Despite Letsie's calls for deescalation, Masopha and the heir apparent Lerotholi began to prepare for war.

== Gun War and conflict with Lerotholi ==
=== Gun War ===
In September 1880, the Basuto rose in rebellion against the British Cape Colony in what came to be known as the Basuto Gun War. According to Basuto oral tradition, paramount chief Letsie I appointed Lerotholi and Masopha as the leaders of the rebellion while simultaneously ordering other chiefs to conform to the regulations of the Cape, so as to maintain power in Basuto hands in case the rebellion failed. Lerotholi and Masopha collaborated closely and managed to create a stalemate, isolating the Cape's army in the Hlotse, Maseru and Mafeteng Districts. Masopha blockaded the garrison of Maseru which consisted of 200 Cape Mounted Riflemen. He burned Maseru's major buildings in his first assault on the town, but further attacks proved less successful. The high cost of conducting the war and the lack of tangible success in the field made the war increasingly unpopular among Cape politicians. On 29 April 1881, High Commissioner for Southern Africa, Sir Hercules Robinson announced the peaceful settlement of the war known as Award. Under its terms the Basuto were allowed to retain their guns and the contested Quthing District, while the rebels were provided amnesty. The Basuto were to pay a collective fine of 5,000 cattle and compensate Basuto loyalists and white traders. The Award marked the end of the conflict.

=== Opposition to the Award ===
Hostilities had ended and most Basuto chiefs including Lerotholi welcomed the Award. 3,000 heads of cattle were paid almost immediately as a gesture of goodwill. Masopha emerged as the leader of Basuto opposition to the Award. Demanding to be granted almost arbitrary power, refusing to pay his share of the hut tax and forbidding the return of the local magistrate. His stance prevented the restitution of property to Basuto loyalists residing in his district. In January 1882, Letsie I assembled an army in order to enforce the Award on Masopha, but the expedition was cancelled as it was judged that Masopha retained considerable popular support.

Major General Charles George Gordon was invited to Basutoland in an effort to negotiate a settlement with the Basuto after the Award was cancelled in April 1882. During his stay in the Cape, Gordon grew increasingly disillusioned with his colleagues' vision of Basutoland's future. Gordon sought an audience with Masopha, believing that he would be able to negotiate a satisfactory settlement to the conflict. In September 1882, Gordon and Jacobus Wilhelmus Sauer traveled to Basutoland in person. On 16 September, Sauer held a private meeting with Letsie I and Lerotholi, consenting to the Basuto chiefs' proposal to assemble a force against Masopha. On 25 September, Gordon departed for a meeting with Masopha at his stronghold in Thaba Bosiu. At the same time Lerotholi finished preparations for an impending attack on his uncle. Masopha feigned interest in Gordon's proposals, intentionally prolonging the negotiations for an extra day. A storm then caused severe rainfall in the adjacent area, thwarting Lerotholi's plans of an assault. Both Gordon and Lerotholi departed Thaba Bosiu without having achieved their respective objectives. Lerotholi felt humiliated by the incident, giving birth to a long lasting rivalry between him and his uncle.

On 18 March 1884, Basutoland was transformed into the High Commission Territory of Basutoland under the Disannexation Act. Masopha, chief Ramanella and their allies continued to demand complete independence from colonial rule. Refusing to welcome the newly appointed High Commissioner Marshal Clarke at a pitso held at Maseru. Masopha's supporters continued to harass former Basuto loyalists, in an effort to retain property once seized from them. Masopha eventually re-invited his district's magistrate and sought arbitration from a colonial court, after clashes broke out between his supporters and those of his erstwhile companion Ramanella. A short period of peace ensued. In 1891, Lerotholi succeeded his father as Basuto paramount chief after the latter's death.

In the mid 1890s Basutoland was affected by a large scale rindepest epidemic which devastated southern Africa's cattle population. A severe drought that happened in parallel brought many Basuto to the edge of starvation. The inability to pay the hut tax gave rise to clashes over land. Lerotholi found himself unable to enforce order in Basutoland's central districts where his uncle Masopha held considerable influence. Lerotholi feared that Masopha's insubordination could lead the British to abandon Basutoland and allow it to be absorbed by the neighboring Orange Free State, where the native African population held significantly fewer rights. To that end, Lerotholi attempted to persuade Clarke's successor Godfrey Lagden to authorize a military expedition; which would pacify the chiefs engaged in land disputes by force.

In October 1897, Lerotholi harrowed four fields in Madisanyane which Masopha continued to claim despite a court order against him. Masopha responded by giving one of the fields to two of his supporters, warning that he was prepared to fight over the fields if their boundaries were to be violated. In the meantime, Masopha's son Moeketsi had illegally crossed into the Free State to punish a man who had run away with another man's wife. Upon catching the man, Moeketsi's retinue assaulted and allegedly castrated him. Moeketsi was subsequently arrested and jailed by the Free State. He successfully escaped from jail and fled to Basutoland soon afterwards. The Free State demanded Moeketsi's extradition, however Masopha refused to comply after facing pressure from his wife. Lagden requested that Lerotholi apprehend Moeketsi. Despite the clash of personalities between Lerotholi and Masopha, Lerotholi was deeply aware of the popular support Masopha enjoyed. Lerotholi therefore insisted on receiving a direct order, so as to shift responsibility for his actions on the colonial government.

=== Civil War and death ===
In January 1898, Lerotholi ordered his men to take key positions around Thaba Bosiu. Several people were killed in the ensuing clashes between Lerotholi's and Masopha's supporters. Lerotholi had issued a call to arms to minor chiefs across the region, amassing approximately 10,000 warriors. Masopha could rely on the support of a comparable number of his tribesmen. Chief Jonathan Molapo withdrew his support for Masopha after the beginning on the siege of Thaba Bosiu, while chief Maama opted to remain neutral. After the exchange of numerous messages between Lagden and Lerotholi, the former finally issued an official order authorizing an attack on Thaba Bosiu. Three weeks into the siege, Maama (who had married two of Masopha's daughters) attempted to negotiate a peaceful resolution of the conflict with Lagden, but was rebuked.

On 26 January, Lerotholi commenced an assault on Thaba Bosiu, defeating the defenders, a total of 55 people were killed in the fighting. Masopha was forced to pay a heavy fine and abandon his ancestral village, while also being stripped of the privileges he once enjoyed as district chief. His son was arrested and forwarded for trial. Following his defeat, a big portion of Masopha's supporters left the Berea region. He died in July 1898. His funeral was described as "unceremonious" and no major chief attended it.

During Masopha's lifetime he was commended for his bravery through numerous lithoko praise-poems. Although the names of major chiefs are rarely given to boys by Basuto parents, Masopha's name is a prominent exception. Songs and poetry honoring Masopha are also recited during Basuto male initiation rituals.
