= Moshoeshoe I =

First King of Lesotho from 1822 to 1870

King Moshoeshoe I
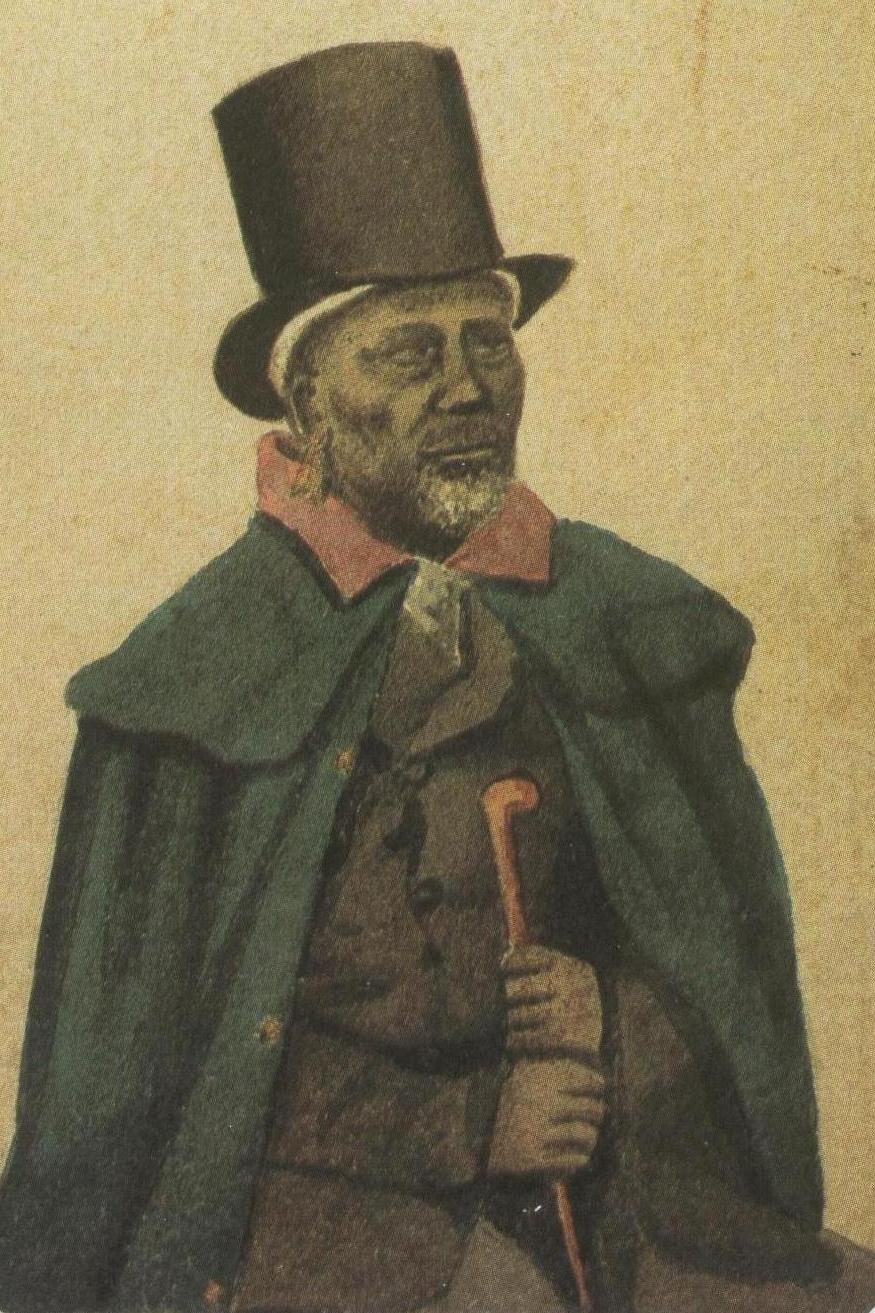
- Painting of King Moshoeshoe I

Paramount Chief of the Basotho
- Reign: 1822 – 18 January 1870
- Predecessor: first monarch
- Successor: Letsie I
- Born: c. 1786; Menkhoaneng, Southern Africa
- Died: 11 March 1870 (aged 83–84); Thaba Bosiu
- Burial: Royal Cemetery, Thaba Bosiu
- Spouses: 13 including: 'MaMohato; 'MaNeko; 'MaSekhonyana; 'MaMakhobalo; 'MaTlali; 'MaNtsane; 'MaMosebetsi; 'MaNtsela; Mankhomote; Mahebetoa; Mankeyane; Penelope Liengoane; 'MaMakibanyone
- Issue: 36 including: Mohato (Letsie I); Molapo Jeremiah; Masopha David; Majara Ntalime; Mathe ('Mamaneella); 'Neko; Mahlape; Sekhonyana Ralikholu Nehemiah; Ntsane John; Tlali George; Tlalinyane; Libopuoa Jeremiah; Sofonia; Tsekelo; Matsotso; Khotso; Makhobalo; Mateleka; Nena; Mokhetli; Makopela; Letlatla; Amane; Fohloane; Kena; Selebalo; Mota; Monethi; Azariel Sekese; Sekhebetlolo; Jobo; Tsita; Mathole; Mokebe; Hlalele; Kuidi
- House: Bamokoteli
- Father: Mokhachane
- Mother: Kholu

Moshoeshoe I (/mʊˈʃwɛʃwɛ/) (c. 1786 – 11 March 1870) was the first king of Lesotho. He was the first son of Mokhachane, a minor chief of the Bamokoteli lineage, a branch of the Bakoena (crocodile) clan. In his youth, he helped his father gain power over some other smaller clans. In 1820, at the age of 34, Moshoeshoe succeeded his father as the Bamokoteli chief and formed his own clan. He and his followers settled at the Butha-Buthe Mountain. He became the first and ultimately longest-serving King of Lesotho in 1822.

== Early life ==
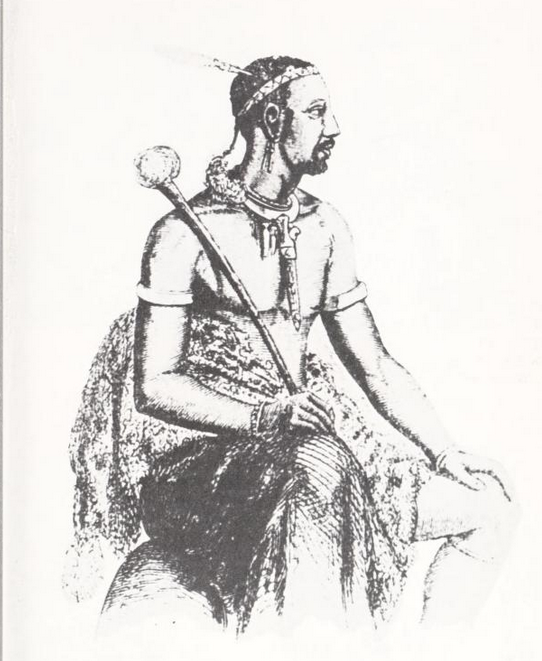
Moshoeshoe I in 1833

Moshoeshoe was born under the name Lepoqo in the village of Menkhoaneng in the north of modern day Lesotho. The precise year of his birth remains unknown, estimates range from 1780 to 1794; 1786 being the most commonly agreed upon date. His name's literal translation is Dispute, originated from accusations of witchcraft which were levied on a man in Menkhoaneng around the time of his birth. He was the first son of Mokhachane, a minor chief of the Bamokoteli sub-clan of the Basotho people and his first wife Kholu. Kholu was the daughter of the Bafokeng clan chief Ntsukunyane and came from the area of the Butha-Buthe further north. The Bamokoteli numbered at most 4,000 people, they were an offshoot of the Bakoena tribe to whom they regularly paid tribute. Lepoqo's family lived in a small kraal near the Tlotsi stream, a tributary of the Caledon River. Little is known about his childhood; however, he remained on good terms with his parents until their death. Around the age of six he began tending to the family's sheep and goats. Lepoqo had an older sister named MaTsouenyane as well as younger brothers named Makhabane and Posholi, and a younger sister named 'MaNtoetse. Mokhachane went on to marry over four other women and father other children. The Sotho people were keen pastoralists; cattle played a central role in their lives and a man's wealth was measured by the number of cattle he possessed.

In 1804, Mokhachane convened the initiation ceremony for Lepoqo and his agemates. The initiation school lasted for six months, during which Lepoqo was circumcised, learned the customs of his people, military tactics and ancient songs. He also composed praise poetry about himself and received a new name; Letlama, meaning "the Binder". As the chief's son Letlama became the leader of the other boys who underwent initiation with him, forming a strong personal bond with each one of them. Shortly after his graduation, Letlama led his band on a successful cattle raid against chief RaMonaheng's village. To commemorate the raid he composed another praise poem where he likened himself to "a razor which has shaved Ramonaheng's beard". Thereafter he became known as Moshoeshoe, meaning "the Shaver", after the onomatopoeic Sesotho word for the sound made by the razor shaving.

As a young man Moshoeshoe continued to lead his band into cattle raids, becoming notable for his skill in seizing cattle. He was ambitious but also known for his short temper, once killing a follower for milking one of his cows without his approval.

Moshoeshoe and his followers, mostly the Bakoena Bamokoteli, some Bafokeng from his maternal side and other relations as well as some clans including the Amazizi, established his village at Butha-Buthe, where his settlement and reign coincided with the growth in power of the well-known Zulu King, Shaka and what is now known as the 'time of troubles' (previously known as 'Difaqane'). During the early 19th century Shaka raided many smaller chiefdoms along the eastern coast of Southern Africa (modern day Kwa-Zulu Natal), incorporating parts of them into his steadily growing Zulu chiefdom. Various small clans were forced to flee the Zulu chief. An era of great wars of calamity followed, known as the time of troubles/Difaqane. It was marked by aggression against the Sotho people by the invading Nguni clans. The attacks also forced Moshoeshoe to move his settlement to the Qiloane plateau. The name was later changed to Thaba Bosiu or "mountain at night" because it was believed to grow during the night and shrink during day. It proved to be an impassable stronghold against enemies.

By the latter part of the 19th century, Moshoeshoe established the nation of the Basotho, in Basutoland. He was popularly known as Morena e Moholo/morena oa Basotho (Great King/King of the Basotho).

== Reign ==
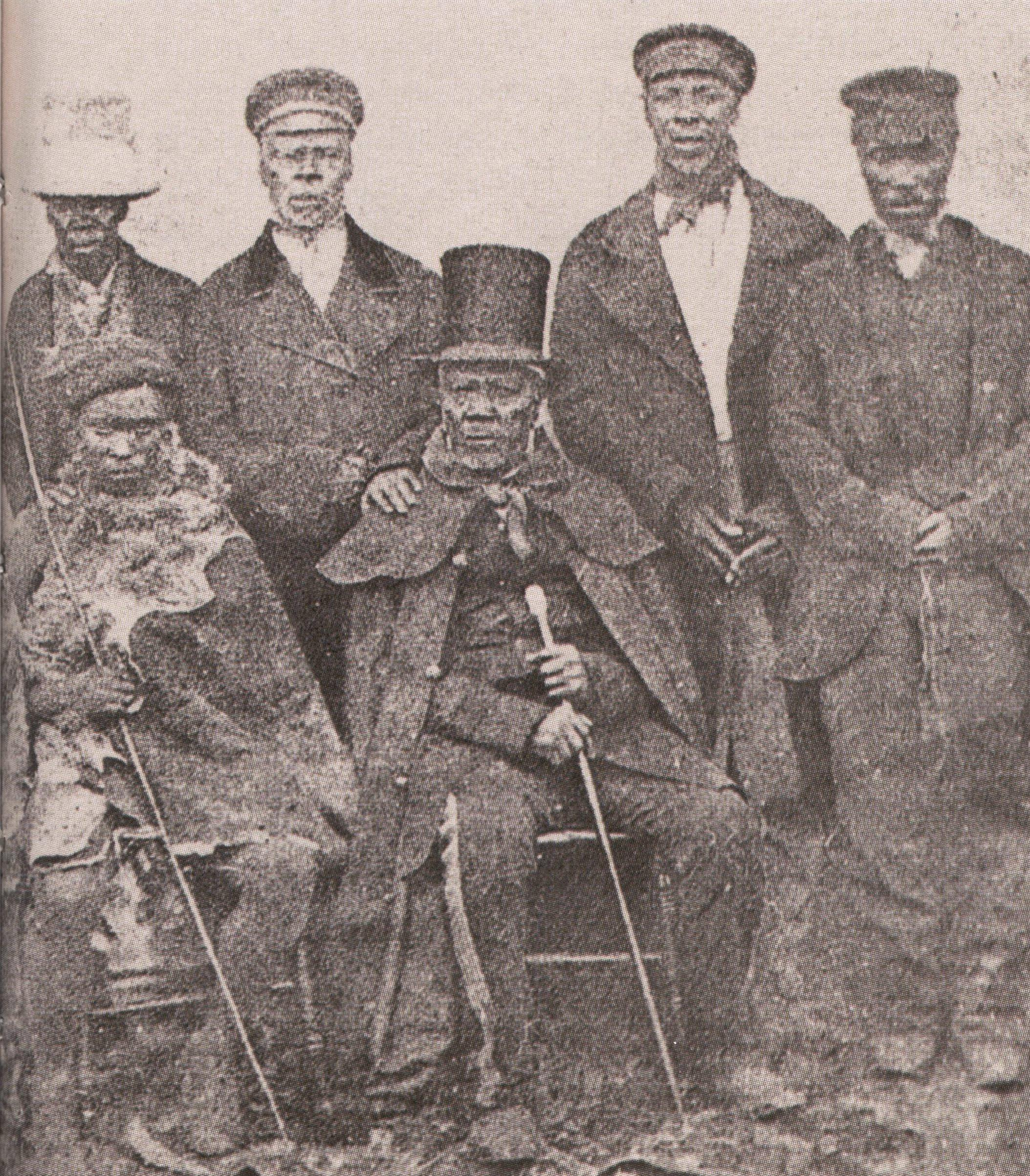
Photograph of Moshoeshoe I with his ministers

In the 1820s, the Basotho faced a number of cattle raids from the Koranna. It was during this time that they first encountered horses and guns in a combat setting. After a number of initial setbacks, the Basotho managed to either capture or acquire horses and guns of their own, and began stockpiling gunpowder. By 1843, Moshoeshoe had accumulated more horses and guns than any other chieftain in South Africa. Nevertheless, most of the guns in Basotho possession were outdated flintlocks, which had flooded the South African market after the introduction of percussion lock muskets. In 1833, missionaries from the Paris Evangelical Missionary Society led by French missionaries Eugène Casalis and Thomas Arbousset began setting their outposts in Basotho lands following Moshoeshoe's invitation. They promoted a combination of Christianity, Western civilization, and commerce. They saw Basotho customs linked to obligatory labor and the dependence of the population on their chiefs as evil. They sought to undermine them by promoting private property, the commodization of production and closer economic ties with European settlers.

In 1843, Moshoeshoe signed a treaty with the governor of the British Cape Colony Sir George Napier, whereby the British recognized the Basuto as their allies. The Basotho were tasked with countering Boer incursions into the Cape during the course of the Great Trek, receiving an annual grant of 75 £ in money or ammunition. The Napier Treaty greatly increased Moshoeshoe's status as a leader. While it deprived him of some lands he had laid claim to, it also recognized his rule over various ethnic groups living in the region. In 1848, Cape governor Sir Harry Smith pressured Moshoeshoe into signing an agreement whereby he recognized British paramount authority over the lands north of the Orange River; while retaining his traditional rights. The agreement also envisioned the creation of an alliance between the British and the Basotho. A series of similar ambiguously worded treaties with local African tribes effectively established the Orange River Sovereignty.

In the north-east, the Basotho and their Taung allies regularly engaged in tit for tat cattle raids against their old enemies the Batlokoa of Kgosi Sekonyela and the Koranna of Gert Taaibosch. The British Resident in the Orange River Sovereignty Major Henry Douglas Warden believed that the Basotho were more to blame for the continuous inter tribal warfare in the region. Warden began delineating borders between the various tribes in the north-east frontier, ignoring Moshoeshoe's long standing claims to several territories in the process. Moshoeshoe believed that the British had failed to protect him against Batlakoa and Boer encroachment, while many of his subjects accused him of cowardice in the face of British oppression. On 25 June 1851, Warden demanded that the Basuto restore cattle and horses to the victims of their past cattle raids. Warden had assembled a mixed force of British, Boer and African troops numbering approximately 2,500 men at Platberg. On 28 June, Warden moved his force against the Taung in an effort to seize stolen cattle. On 30 June, Warden's force was defeated by a Basotho-Taung army at the Battle of Viervoet.

In October Moshoeshoe wrote to both Smith and Warden, explaining that he had acted in self-defense and intended to maintain cordial relations with the British. In February 1852, the British agreed to redraw the boundaries in the south-west and to cease colonial interference into inter-tribal conflicts in exchange for the restoration of the cattle the Basotho had stolen since September 1850. Negotiations fell through and Smith's replacement Major-General Sir George Cathcart was waiting for the hostilities with the Xhosa to wane before launching a punitive expedition against the Basotho.

On 20 December 1852, a British expeditionary forced clashed with the Basotho in the Battle of Berea. A combination of poor British planning and determined Basotho resistance resulted in a temporary British retreat from the area. Fearing that a second British assault would result in his military defeat, Moshoeshoe sued for peace attaining favorable terms and restoring amicable relations with the British. In 1853, Moshoeshoe grew tired of Sekonyela's raiding, deciding to decisively deal with the Batlokoa. In November 1853, the Basotho army defeated the Batlakoa and their Koranna allies at the battle of Khoro-e-Betloa, subsequently seizing their stronghold of Jwalaboholo. The bulk of the Batlakoa either scattered or joined the Basotho. The British pulled out of the region in 1854, causing the formation of the Boer Orange Free State.

In 1858, hostilities broke out between the Basotho and the Orange Free State. Initially achieving a victory in the first war, inferiority in both marksmanship and materiel of the Basotho caused a defeat in the two wars that followed, which lasted until 1868. In 1866, the two sides signed the Treaty of Thaba Bosiu, whereby Moshoeshoe ceded most of his kingdom's arable land to the Boers. Hostilities resumed soon afterwards and the Boers began employing a scorched earth policy, leading to starvation among the Basotho. Fearing that the destruction of the Basotho people was imminent, Moshoeshoe, his sons and local missionaries began appealing to British High Commissioner for Southern Africa Sir Philip Wodehouse and the Colony of Natal for protection. Although initially reluctant to intervene, the British were worried by the disruption in trade caused by the war and the possibility of Boer expansion to the Pondoland coast. In December 1867, the Colonial Office approved Basotholand's annexation by Natal. Distrusting the Natal administration and believing that the Cape Colony was not yet ready to absorb the new territory, Wodehouse disregarded those instructions. He blocked the supply of ammunition to the Free State and on 12 March 1868 proclaimed Basotho land to be a royal dominion. Moshoeshoe died on 11 March 1870 and was succeeded by his oldest son Letsie I.

== Family and lineage ==
In 1810, Moshoeshoe married ’Mamabela, daughter of the Bafokeng chief, Seephephe, who was chosen for him by his father. She became his senior wife assuming the name 'MaMohato with whom he had four sons and Letsie, Molapo, Masopha and Majara as well as a daughter named Mathe. Their relationship was described by visiting missionaries as deeply affectionate. ’MaMohato died in 1834 either due to complications during childbirth or due to a violent domestic argument stemming from an act of infidelity she had committed with one of Moshoeshoe's main councilors.

Moshoeshoe practiced polygamy; he had 30 wives in 1833, with the number rising to 140 in 1865. The names of 17 of them have been traced. Polygamy allowed Moshoeshoe to both forge alliances with other chiefs and increase his wealth as his subjects were expected to cultivate his wives' field per Sotho custom. Despite the presence of his other wives, he considered himself a widower following ’MaMohato's death. Only the children from his first marriage constituted the royal line of descent. Apart from ’MaMohato, only ‘Maneko a second ranking wife wielded considerable influence in the household. Similarly to the principal wife second ranking wives were women of power, who had separate houses, herds of cattle, fields and servants. Their sons were expected to take important positions in the kingdom. Moshoeshoe's third ranking wives were assigned to the houses of more senior wives where they acted as servants. Unlike more senior wives they did not cohabit with their husband and their condition bordered on slavery. Foreign visitors and Moshoeshoe's subjects were allowed to have sexual relationships with his third ranking wives, yet the children produced from such encounters were considered to be his.

== Legacy and cultural heritage ==
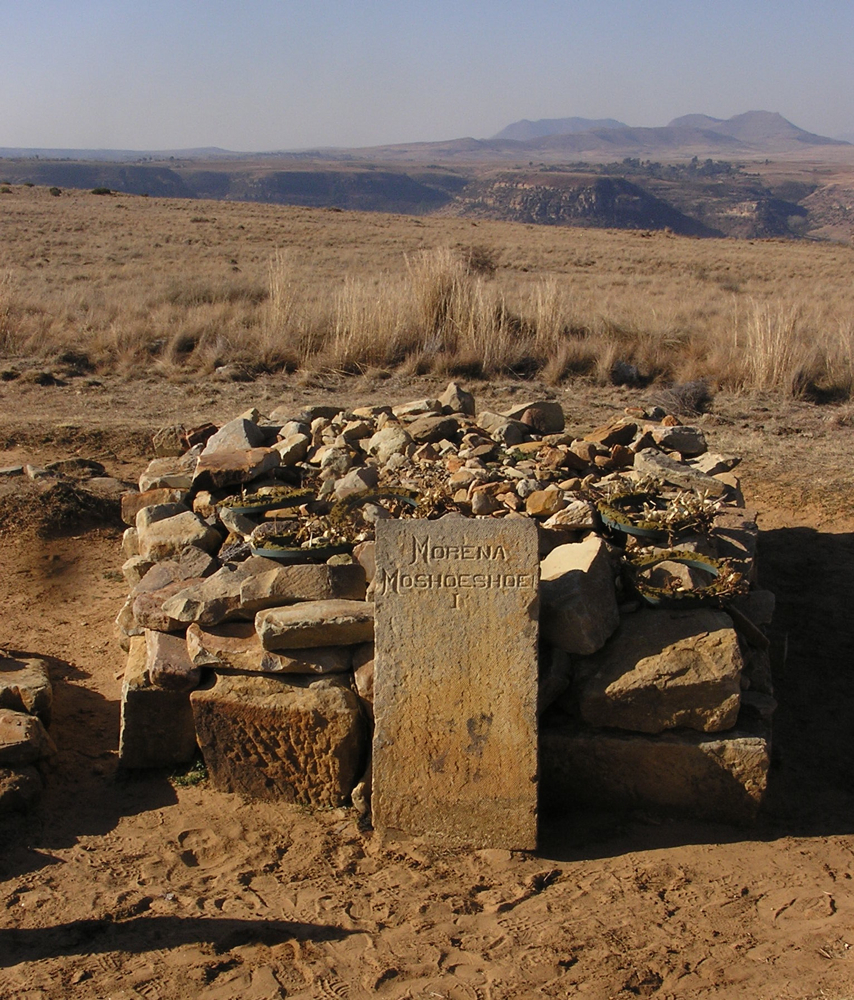
Photo of the grave of King Moshoeshoe I atop Thaba Bosiu taken in July 2011

A collection of approximately 515 objects associated with King Moshoeshoe I is held by the British museum. According to the museum records and historical accounts, many of the objects were assembled for the 1862 International Exhibition in London during a period when Moshoeshoe were seeking British protection against Boer settlers. Following the exhibition, the collections were acquired by the Collector Henry Christy and later entered the British Museum through his 1865 bequest.

In 2017, Lesotho's Department of Culture began discussion with the British Museum concerning the return of part of collection after the Director of Culture Mats'osane Molibeli, examined the objects during the museum international training programme. The Museum confirmed openess to a long term loan rather than an outright return. In October 2018, a photographic exhibition of Moeshoeshoe belongings was held at the Thaba Bosiu Cultural Village Museum enabling Basotho communities to reconnect visually with the collections while the discussions continued.

In June 2019, Dijon Design and Lesotho's High Commissioner Rethabile Mokaeane met British Museum Director Hartwig Fischer and museum representatives to discuss the possible return or long-term loan of objects associated with King Moshoeshoe I. Dijon Design also consulted Lesotho's Department of Culture on the new Lesotho National Museum, which was intended to receive and display the collection. A formal request submitted in December 2019 by Dijon Design sought a long-term loan of 80 objects in display in the planned Lesotho National Museum. This was because the British Museum Act 1963 generally restricts the permanent disposal of objects in Museum's collection. Although the proposal was delayed by the COVID-19 pandemic and museum construction, progress was made and discussions have continued as the museum project advances. As part of efforts to ensure the return of the objects associated with King Moshoeshoe I, researcher and cultural worker Lineo Segoete convened pitso (town halls) to discuss the stalled efforts to secure the return of King Moshoeshoe I’s belongings from the British Museum. The meetings generated strong public interest and helped renew awareness and discussion of restitution in Lesotho.

Moshoeshoe Day is an annual national holiday in Lesotho celebrated on 11 March, the date of Moshoeshoe's death. Celebrations include the laying of wreaths on Moshoeshoe's grave at Thaba Bosiu by a delegation led by Lesotho's monarch, a celebratory parade and other entertainment activities.

The Moshoeshoe I International Airport, Lesotho's only international airport is named in his honour.

South African-made shweshwe fabric is named for King Moshoeshoe I who once received a gift of it and then popularized it throughout his realm.

He would also be brought up in the 1993 Pinky and the Brain Animaniacs episode Win Big.

== See also ==
- Shaka Zulu – contemporary
- Sekhukhune I King of the Bapedi

Regnal titles
Preceded by First monarch	King of Lesotho; 1822–1870	Succeeded by Letsie I

== Sources ==
- Atmore, Anthony; Sanders, Peter (1971). "Sotho Arms and Ammunition in the Nineteenth Century". The Journal of African History. 12 (4): 535–544. doi:10.1017/S0021853700011130. S2CID 161528484.
- Becker, Peter (1982) [1969]. Hill of Destiny: The Life and Times of Moshesh, Founder of the Basotho. Penguin. ISBN 978-0140059786.
- Burman, Sandra (1981). Chiefdom Politics and Alien Law: Basutoland under Cape Rule 1871-1884. Palgrave Macmillan. ISBN 978-1-349-04639-3.
- Eldredge, Elizabeth (2007). Power in Colonial Africa Conflict and Discourse in Lesotho, 1870–1960. The University of Wisconsin Press. ISBN 978-0-299-22370-0.
- Machobane, L. B.; Karschay, Stephan (1990). Government and Change in Lesotho, 1800-1966: A Study of Political Institutions. Palgrave Macmillan. ISBN 978-0-333-51570-9.
- Maliehe, Sean (2014). "An Obscured Narrative in the Political Economy of Colonial Commerce in Lesotho, 1870–1966". Historia. 59 (2): 28–45. hdl:2263/43121. ISSN 0018-229X.
- Morelli, Ettore (2022). "Bonded: Elite Marriage and Slavery in Nineteenth-Century Lesotho". Slavery & Abolition. 43 (2): 285–319. doi:10.1080/0144039X.2022.2063232. S2CID 249484968.
- Rosenberg, Scott; Weisfelder, Richard; Frisbie-Fulton, Michelle (2004). Historical Dictionary of Lesotho. Scarecrow Press. ISBN 0-8108-4871-6.
- Sanders, Peter (1969). "Sekonyela and Moshweshwe: Failure and Success in the Aftermath of the Difaqane". The Journal of African History. 10 (3): 439–455. doi:10.1017/S0021853700036379. S2CID 161299840.
- Sanders, Peter (1975). Moshoeshoe, Chief of the Sotho. Heinemann. ISBN 978-0435327934.
- Thompson, Leonard (1975). Survival in Two Worlds : Moshoeshoe of Lesotho, 1786-1870. Clarendon Press. ISBN 978-0198216933.
- Tylden, G. (1935). "The Affair at the Berea Mountain, 20th December, 1852". Journal of the Society for Army Historical Research. 14 (53): 33–45. JSTOR 44227901.
