= William Eyre (British Army officer, born 1805) =

Major-General Sir William Eyre KCB
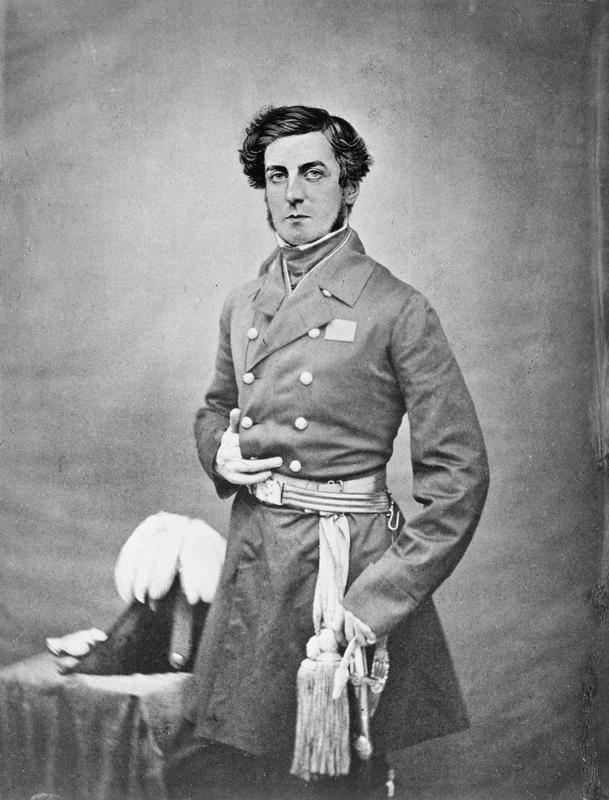
- Photograph of Eyre during the Crimean War
- Born: 21 October 1805
- Died: 18 September 1859 (aged 53)
- Military career
- Allegiance: United Kingdom
- Branch: British Army
- Rank: Major-General
- Unit: 73rd (Perthshire) Regiment of Foot
- Commands: 3rd Brigade; 3rd Division; Commander-in-Chief, North America
- Conflicts: Seventh Xhosa War; Eighth Xhosa War; Crimean War
- Awards: Knight Commander of the Order of the Bath

Major-General Sir William Eyre, KCB (21 October 1805 – 18 September 1859) was a British Army officer.

== Life ==
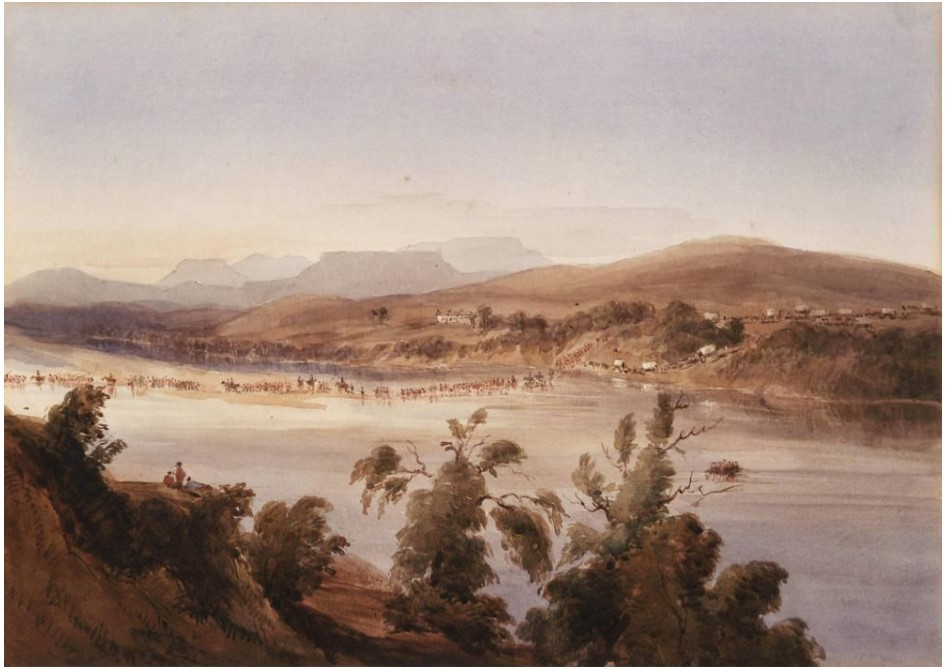
Eyre's brigade crossing the Orange River in 1851–3, by James Maurcie Primrose

William Eyre was born on 21 October 1805, the younger son of Vice-admiral Sir George Eyre. He was educated at Rugby School; commissioned as an ensign in 1823. He received command of a company in the 73rd (Perthshire) Regiment of Foot in 1829. Ten years later he was a major. He served in Seventh Xhosa War and was promoted to lieutenant colonel the same year. During the Eighth Xhosa War he defeated the Xhosa at the Battle of Quibigui River and the Battle of Committees Hill. In 1852, he commanded the right wing in the punitive attack on Moshoeshoe I at the Battle of Berea.

The same year he was appointed Companion of the Bath, served as aide-de-camp to Queen Victoria, and was promoted to colonel. In 1854 he commanded the 3rd Brigade and later the 3rd Division in Crimean War and was promoted to major-general. In 1855 he accepted appointment as commander of Her Majesty's forces in British North America and was appointed Knight Commander of the Bath and in the following year, 1856, he was decorated by France and Turkey. His health had been broken during the Crimean War and he resigned due to ill health in June 1859. He died on 18 September of that year.

Military offices
Preceded by Sir William Rowan	Commander-in-Chief, North America; 1855–1859	Succeeded by Sir William Williams
