= Johan Fick =

Boer Commandant

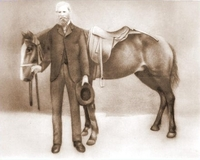
General Johan Isak Jacobus Fick

General Johan Isak Jacobus Fick was the founder of Ficksburg, a town in the Free State province, South Africa. After the Basotho Wars, peace was made and the town named after Johan Fick. He was also known as Commandant Generaal Johan Fick.

He was born on September 22, 1816, on the farm Kruisfontein, in Olifantshoek in the Grahamstown district of South Africa. He died on May 20, 1892, at the age of 75. He was buried in the town of Ficksburg. He was the son of Paul Hendrik Fick and Lenie Meyer. He was the second eldest of four sons his parents had, with the eldest Johan inheriting the family farm.

== The Great Trek ==
His father Johan took part in the Battle of Grahamstown in 1819 to help the British defend Grahamstown against the Xhosa attack. During these years, the Xhosa's continued to raid the Boers farms. In total, 40 farmers (Boers) were killed and 416 farmhouses burnt down. In addition, 5,700 horses, 115,000 head of cattle, and 162,000 sheep were plundered by Xhosa tribespeople. The next Xhosa war in the region broke out in 1834, when the junior Johan Fick was 17 years old. He was injured twice during the conflict.

Following the defeat of the Xhosa's at the 1834 war, the British governor Sir Benjamin d'Urban declared that Xhosa lands were to become part of the British protectorate and that the Boers were entitled to reparations. This was however overturned by, Lord Glenelg, as he felt the terms unjust. Johan Fick and other boers in turn lost faith in the British justice system and decided to move north in search of a peaceful settlement.

Johan Fick did however not join his mother and brothers during the Great Trek of 1836. Instead, he stayed behind and married Susanna Christina Johanna Fourie on May 5, 1837, in Olifantshoek. They had a son, Paul Fick on February 8, 1838. Following the birth of their eldest son, they too decided to leave the Grahamston area and move north, following Piet Retief to Natal. Johan Fick and his family traveled via Senekal to Unkomaas where he settled for a while, but he did not enjoy the British involvement in the area. He finally decided to settle back near Senekal.

== Orange River Sovereignty ==
After settling in the Free State area, Johan Fick fought the British at the lost Battle of Boomplaats in 1848, where he lost his horse and had to flee the British on foot. He and other Boer fighters were labelled as rebels and had to lay down their arms and pay a fine. Fick paid the fine, but refused to lay down arms. Impressed, the British asked Johan Fick to remain a 'veldkornet' for the new British government that ruled the Free State after the Battle of Boomplaats. His new role meant that he had to collect taxes (of which he could keep 10%), he married couples and acted as a judge for criminal and civil cases.

== Senekal Uprising ==
In 1851 Fick was required, through his position as 'veldkornet', to ask the Boers to fight for the British against the Basothos under Moshoeshoe I, at the Battle of Viervoet. However, he was forced to fight alone with the British as the other Boers refused to fight. The British, with many of their troops fighting in the east of South Africa at the time, were outnumbered and lost the battle. As Fick asked the Boers to fight with the English again, he was considered a traitor and instead appointed Freek Senekal, who the town Senekal was named after, as their 'veldkornet'. Fick was forced to leave Senekal and moved to current day, Ficksburg. The British got 780 reinforcements from Natal to help with the Senekal rebels under Freek Senekal. Fick refused to attack the rebels at night, as the British had planned. The threat of the reinforcements was, however, enough to bring the Senekal rebels to the table. Once the identities of the rebels were learnt by the British Major Warden, they were sentenced to death, but Fick successfully asked to have their sentences reduced to fines.

== The British retreat ==
Following the British defeat at the Battle of Viervoet in 1851 and the Battle of Berea in December 1852 it became clear that the limited financial and military resources available to the British in Orange River Sovereignty that they struggled to maintain control of the boundaries in this territory. They saw the possibility of the Boers being used to maintain the security of the remaining British colonies. The Boers at this point enjoyed the British help in defending the region and wanted to maintain British rule. The Boers even unsuccessfully sent a party to England to ask the British to remain sovereign in the Free State. Ultimately, the British departed and this led to the formation of the Orange Free State in 1854.

The Basothos were emboldened by their defeats of the British. Without the British support, the Boers lived in fear of Basotho raiding parties. As the parties would come from modern day Lesotho and the farmers would often flee westward to avoid the raiders. Once the raiders had vacated, the farmers would return to what was left. In general, the farmers would keep their distance if approached by Basothos.

== General Fick ==
=== Second Free State-Basotho War ===
President Johannes Brand became the fourth president of the Orange Free State in 1864. He wanted to keep the peace with the Basothos and made an agreement with Moshoeshoe I, that Sir Philip Wodehouse would be the mediator and set a defined border between The Free State and Lesotho. Wodehouse required any Basothos that was on the wrong side of the border, to move by November 1864. Although the Basothos had agreed to the mediation process originally, they did not want to abide by the new border. The boers had placed guards on the border to avoid crossings. However, two of these guards were taken prisoner by the Basothos for a few days.

The boers demanded reparations of 50 cows for taking the two men into captivity. This ultimatum was turned down by the Basothos effectively declaring war and starting the second of the Free State–Basotho Wars. Per law the Free State army had to appoint a leader of the armed forces, or a Commandant-general for the upcoming battle and President Brand with the support of the troops appointed Fick as general.

The battle was fought, however, the Basothos outnumbered the boers by too much. And the use of canons kept the Basothos at bay. Fick's commando withdrew to restock ammunition. This led to more attacks by the Basothos in the Free State. A few days later 3,000 Sotho warriors raided Boer farms in the Caledon Valley, killing around 14 settlers and returned home with 100,000 sheep and several thousand cattle and horses. Further attacks happened in Kroonstad and Bloemfontein, capturing livestock and killing settlers.

=== The Siege of Thaba Bosiu ===
Throughout July the Sotho, seeing that they were still no match for Boer firepower, generally withdrew to their homes. By the end of July 1865 the Sotho were concentrating on the defense of Thaba Bosiu. In early August, Fick was joined by another Boer commando under Louw Wepener that had come up from the south. On August 8, Wepener directed an attack against on the south side of the mountain. On August 15, Wepener led another assault against the mountain that concentrated on northwestern Khubelu Pass. Boer's artillery bombed the positions higher up the mountain, but had to cease as the attackers advanced.

Wepener was shot dead. While the Boers were mustering reinforcements around sunset, the Sotho launched a counterattack that drove them down the mountain. Fick's force then laid siege to Thaba Bosiu. As time went on, more and more Boers deserted and by the middle of September Fick had to withdraw his camps on the southern and eastern sides of Thaba Bosiu. On September 25, the Boers left and divided into two commandos, with one under Fick raiding to the north and one under P. J. Wessels raiding to the south.

=== Paul Kruger reinforcements ===
Following attacks by the Basothos into Transvaal, President Pretorius declared war against the Basothos and asked General Paul Kruger to lead the army against the attackers. On 6 October 1865, the Free State forces under Fick and the Transvaal forces under Kruger, decided to jointly defend the border. Over the next month the joint troops had a number of minor victories until the Transvaal troops returned on 30 October, due to a lack of clothing and the harvest season. President Johannes Brand of the Free State decided not to give any of the conquered land to the Transvaal burghers, resulting some unease. Although Fick intended to starve the Sotho into submission by destroying crops, he did not have enough men to do so. In January 1866 the Free State commandos withdrew from Lesotho in order to reorganize.

=== Treaty of Mpharane ===
Following further conflict on the border, peace was made with Moshoeshoe's son, Molapo on 26 March 1866 in Ficksburg, with the treaty of Moharane. As part of the negotiations, General Fick sent his son, Paul with Fanie Jacobs, to live with the Basothos. In return, Molapo, sent two of his sons, Jonathan and Joel, to live with the Boers. The boers and the Bashotos met in Ficksburg on the Eastern side of the Caledon. President Brand had come from Bloemfontein to join. After an agreement for peace was reached, 25 gun shots were fired. It was agreed that everything north of Phuthiatsana was now the Free State. This was a major blow to Moshoeshoe. With his people anxious to harvest their remaining crops, Moshoeshoe, on 3 April, agreed to modified Free State terms that he surrender 3,000 cattle and give up a considerable amount of land that had been taken by the Boers during the conflict. This second treaty was known as the Treaty of Thaba Bosiu

== Final years ==
Following the Second Free State-Basotho War, Fick was promised a farm near the vicinity of Ficksburg by President Brand, however the Volksraad refused the gift. Upset, Fick bought a farm called Sterkfontein, where he lived until his death.
