= Free State–Basotho Wars =

1858–1868 series of Boer Wars in Southern Africa

Free State-Basotho Wars
- Part of the Boer Wars
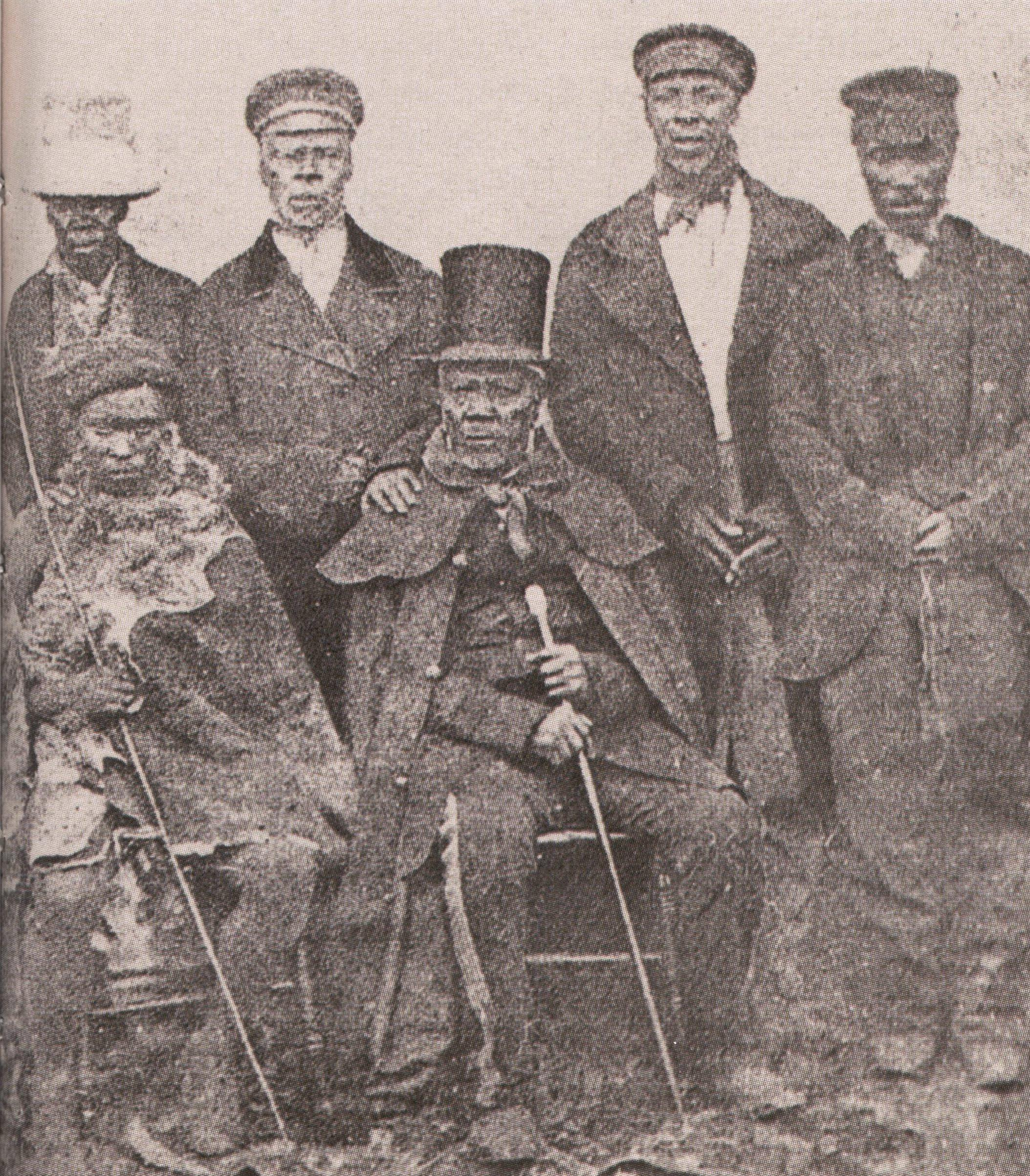
- King Moshoeshoe I, founder of the Basotho nation, with his Ministers.
Date	1858-1868
Location	South Africa, Lesotho
Result	Free State acquiring large tracts of land from Basotho and Basotho eventually accepting annexation as a part of the British Empire and being placed under Crown protection.
Territorial changes	Basutoland placed under British protection

Belligerents
Basotho kingdom	Orange Free State

Commanders and leaders
King Moshoeshoe I	Johannes Brand

The Free State–Basotho Wars refers to a series of wars fought between King Moshoeshoe I, the ruler of the Basotho Kingdom, and white settlers, in what is now known as the Free State. These can be divided into the Senekal's War of 1858, the Seqiti War in 1865−1866 and the Third Basotho War in 1867−68.

These three wars were fought over the territorial rights in the area between the Caledon and Orange rivers; from present day Wepener to Zastron, and the area north of the Caledon River, which includes present day Harrismith and the area further westwards. The wars resulted in the white settlers acquiring large tracts of land from Basotho, and the Basotho eventually accepting annexation as a part of the British Empire.

== Background ==
In 1818, King Moshoeshoe I, who was the son of Mokhachane, chief of the Ba-Mokoteli branch of the Koena (Crocodile) clan, helped to gain power over small clans who had been displaced during the Mfecane. Mfecane is a Zulu word and in the Sesotho language it's called Difaqane, which means "the crushing" or "scattering". It describes a period of warfare and famine in southern Africa between 1815 and about 1840. In 1820, King Moshoeshoe became the king of the Basotho Nation, who had fallen under his centralized authority due to competition for resources, which was intensified by a drought.

Morena e Moholo (the Great King), as he was called by his Basotho Nation, owned larger areas of Free State and accommodated the different ethnic groups of the Nguni tribes that escaped Shaka's attacks during the Mfecane. He extended and strengthened his Basotho Nation by integrating these ethnic groups and named them a single Basotho Nation. He offered land, food, and protection to the Boers and Nguni tribes which led to the formation of Phuthaditjhaba ("meeting place of tribes" in Sesotho) in the Qwa-Qwa region. King Moshoeshoe allowed the British, Boers and Nguni escapees to settle on his designated settlements with the notion of giving them land and food for survival. However whenever either of them attempted to claim his land without his authority then war would ensue, which would lead to the Basotho Nation claiming victories to protect their land and resources. King Moshoeshoe and some of his people retreated to the mountain fortress of Thaba Bosiu in 1824 whilst the rest of the Basotho Nation still settled in Free State province.

In the late 1820s, a group of Korana (a group of Khoikhoi settlers) and Dutch-speaking people of mixed descent arrived in the vicinity of Moshoeshoe I's kingdom. As they were mounted on horseback and armed with guns, Moshoeshoe decided to arm his people and give them horses. As various training stations were established for Basotho Kingdom, they obtained advanced and intensive weapon training to prepare themselves against any war that might erupt.

The arrival of white settlers known as the Boers in the area, due to the Great Trek, was initially useful to the Great King Moshoeshoe, as they created a buffer between the Basotho and the Korana. The Boers crossed the Orange River from the Cape Colony in the mid-1820s. Although these settlers allegedly asked for this permission to settle there, they later claimed it - despite Moshoeshoe's view that he had lent it to them. In 1845 a treaty was signed, which recognised Boer settlement in the area; however no boundaries were drawn between the area of Boer settlement and Moshoeshoe's kingdom. This dispute led to inevitable border clashes and a discernible boundary became necessary.

The British, who controlled the area between the Orange and Vaal Rivers eventually proclaimed the Warden line (after Major Henry Douglas Warden). This line divided territory between British territory and the Basotho under Moshoeshoe, and stretched from Cornetspruit and the Orange River through Vechtkop to Jammerbergdrift on the Caledon.

The Warden line caused much resentment, as the fertile Caledon River Valley served as a vital area in terms of agriculture for both the British and the Basotho. This border line was therefore not acceptable to the Great King Moshoeshoe, and hostility followed, which led to conflict between the Basotho Nation and the British, who were defeated by King Moshoeshoe at the battle of Viervoet in 1851. In 1851, King Moshoeshoe also offered Boer leader Andries Pretorius an alliance against the British in the sovereignty.

To punish Basotho, British General Sir George Cathcart then brought troops to the Mohokane River, and King Moshoeshoe was ordered to pay a fine. When he did not pay the fine in full, a battle broke out on the Berea Plateau in 1852, where the British suffered heavy losses due to the armed Basotho cavalry. This sealed the fate of the sovereignty of the Basotho government, even though Cathcart was initially in favour of withdrawal.

In 1854, the cost of maintaining the sovereignty became too much for the British and they therefore handed over the territory to the Boers through the signing of the Sand River Convention. The Boers therefore claimed the land beyond the Caledon River, naming it the Republic of the Orange Free State. This began further conflict over land and undefined boundaries with the Basotho, who regarded themselves as the rightful owners, and who continued to use the land for grazing.

== Senekal's War ==
In February 1858, tensions rose in the Orange Free State over land. Basotho claimed a considerable strip of ancestral territory which the Boers wanted to claim for themselves. Further conflict occurred after Jacobus Nicolaas Boshoff; President of the Orange Free State [OFS], and Moshoeshoe discussed issues of armed conflict and cattle rustling. However, these discussions only led to Boshoff declaring war on the Basotho on 19 March 1858 (also reported as 22 March 1858). The Basotho were formidable opponents, and the Boers suffered substantial losses, as they were unable to penetrate the Basotho mountain stronghold of Thaba Bosiu (also called Thaba Bosigo). This war is also known as the First Basotho War or the War of Senekal.

During this war, the Boers destroyed many mission stations in the Basotho kingdom, as they blamed them for educating and instilling a sense of pride among the Basotho. These mission stations had been set up by missionaries from the Paris Evangelical Society, who arrived at Thaba Bosiu in 1833. These missionaries were the first to write the Sesotho language and helped teach the Basotho people learn how to write the language.

The Orange Free State forces had dissolved, and Boshoff was compelled to make overtures to Moshoeshoe for a suspension of hostilities. Moshoeshoe agreed unconditionally to mediation, for though he was apparently master of the situation, he was wise enough to see that if he pushed his advantages too far he would bring a new enemy into the field. On 1 June an armistice was agreed upon and signed, under which all military operations on both sides were to be suspended.

== Seqiti War ==
After this war an uneasy peace followed. Johannes Brand, who replaced Boshoff, took initiative and negotiated with Moshoeshoe, who objected that the frontier was not clear. However, hostilities re-surfaced, and President Brand believed that the OFS should use its military superiority against the Basotho. Moshoeshoe had also realized his precarious position, and had applied for British protection from Sir Philip Wodehouse, a new commissioner who had arrived in the Cape in 1861.

The Warden Line had then been reaffirmed, and although the Basotho were given time to withdraw, attacks continued later nonetheless. In 1865, the Orange Free State launched the Second Basotho War known in Sesotho as the Seqiti War. The word "seqiti" refers to the sound made by the new cannon the Boers used to crush the Basotho strongholds, mainly in the present day Free State province.

President Johannes Brand appointed Johan Fick as general to lead the Free State army. The Free State army then began to seize cattle and destroy crops, and two attempts were then made to storm Moshoeshoe's stronghold at Thaba Bosiu. Moshoeshoe was then compelled to accept the peace of Thaba Bosiu on 11 April 1866, due to the exhaustion of Basotho food supplies. Moshoeshoe's son Molapo had also allegedly concluded a separate peace treaty. Moshoeshoe then renewed entreaties for British protection after a short armistice. This was due to the fact that the Orange Free State government was late in allocating land, the Basotho slowly advanced over the border line, and further tensions mounted. The Orange Free State government began to raise an armed force, which was aggravated by the murder of two Whites in Ladybrand in June 1867. Brand demanded the handover of the murderers, but Moshoeshoe stated that he had not agreed to the frontier line of 1866, and therefore the events had not occurred on Orange Free State territory.

== Third Basotho War ==
In July 1867, the third war between the Orange Free State and the Basotho began. The Boer forces overran Moshoeshoe's land and conquered all the land except the impregnable fortress of Thaba Bosiu. The Orange Free State forces had achieved great military success, and Moshoeshoe was compelled to ask for British assistance. Basutoland was then annexed on 12 March 1868, after Wodehouse, by now Governor of the Cape Colony, received instructions to negotiate with Moshoeshoe for the recognition of the Basotho as British subjects. On 12 March 1868, the British parliament declared the Basotho Kingdom a British protectorate. The Orange Free State was forced to discontinue the war if it was not to raise trouble with the British Empire. In February 1869, the boundaries of present-day Lesotho (previously Basutoland) were then drawn up according to the Convention of Aliwal-North. This convention gave the Conquered Territory to the Orange Free State, and the boundary line was moved further south to Langeberg. No further armed conflict between the Free State and the Basotho took place after this. As a result, King Moshoeshoe was able to save his kingdom from being overrun by the Boers. He died in 1870, two years after the end of war, and was buried at the summit of Thaba Bosiu.
