= Nthabiseng Mokoena (archaeologist) =

Lesotho archaeologist

Nthabiseng Mokoena-Mokhali
- Citizenship: Lesotho
- Education: University of the Witwatersrand, University of Cape Town
- Occupation: Archaeologist
- Employer: National University of Lesotho
- Known for: One of very few female archaeologists in Lesotho

Nthabiseng Mokoena-Mokhali is an archaeologist and academic who is a lecturer at the National University of Lesotho. As of 2021 she was the only woman in Lesotho to work as an archaeologist.

== Career ==
Mokoena-Mokhali's career began when she was working as a Field Technician in Lesotho on the Metolong Cultural Resource Management project. However, she has been interested in the past from a young age and says that it was the "powerful experience" of finding out her own family history which inspires her still. After working on the Metolong research project she began to study at the University of the Witwatersrand - first for an Honours Degree then later for a Master's degree. For her PhD, she joined the University of Cape Town. Her doctoral research explored the history of the Basotho nation by tracing its roots at Thaba-Bosiu, a national heritage site in Lesotho, where the nation was formed. by combining historical and scientific approaches, her research brought to light previously unknown and ignored histories of Basotho by highlighting the daily lives of people who settled on the mountain. The findings of her study provided an alternative history of Basotho that is more familiar and informed by local voices. Her fieldwork at Thaba Bosiu explored the place and its role in nation-building by further analysing the four phases of community there: hunter-gatherer; Nguni 'Bafokeng' communities; Basotho communities today; alongside the European communities dating to the 1800s.

Community engagement is an important aspect of Mokoena's archaeological practice and she is seen as a ground-breaking figure in the field of community archaeology, as well as archaeology in Lesotho more generally. She is a proponent of the decoloniality movement. Her practice includes working with local communities to examine the rock art in Matatiele in South Africa’s Eastern Cape province, which in turn led to those communities producing recommendations that included their views and protected their sacred places. Mokoena's community work also involves ethnographic research, which informs wider understanding of how communities connect to and understand 'heritage' and 'their heritage. At Masakala there was a distinction between public heritage and material culture, which was 'national' and so belonged to the community, and a private cultural heritage of initiation practices, which was private and secretive and so also belonged to the community. In Matatiele, Mokoena's research also highlights the complex relationships communities have with their local heritage. She also demonstrated that official heritage management plans do not value, nor take into account, indigenous beliefs; these beliefs must be at the forefront of any strategy in order for people locally to feel valued and involved. She has also noted that heritage centres are not a solution for every community, their cost can outweigh their reach and they may become 'white elephants'.

Mokoena-Mokhali intends to extend the School of Archaeology at the National University of Lesotho, as well as extending its study to primary and secondary school students in the country. She is also a co-author of the Historical Dictionary of Lesotho

In addition to her research, she has also held roles on the council of the Association of Southern African Professional Archaeologists (ASAPA).

== Publications ==
- Mokoena, Nthabiseng (2017). "Community involvement and heritage management in rural South Africa". Journal of Community Archaeology & Heritage. 4 (3): 189–202. doi:10.1080/20518196.2017.1357233. ISSN 2051-8196. S2CID 158193599.
