= Menkhoaneng =

- Community Council
- Geographic Center of Community
- Coordinates: 28°53′08″S 28°17′33″E
- Country: Lesotho
- District: Leribe District
- Elevation: 6,115 ft (1,864 m)

Population (2006)
  - Total: 22,502
- Time zone: UTC+2 (CAT)
- Coordinates computed from Lesotho Villages file.

Menkhoaneng is a community council located in the Leribe District of Lesotho. Its population in 2006 was 22,502.

== Villages ==
The community of Menkhoaneng includes the villages of:

- Betha-Betha
- Boithatelo (Ha Tsolo)
- Botšaba
- Ha 'Mali
- Ha Bokoro
- Ha Bolao
- Ha Boroko
- Ha Hlatsoane
- Ha Jethe
- Ha Jobo
- Ha Khabo
- Ha Khanare
- Ha Khati
- Ha Leabua (Lentsoaneng)
- Ha Leaooa
- Ha Lebonya (Lentsoaneng)
- Ha Lehloba
- Ha Lekhoele
- Ha Leqele
- Ha Lesala (Botsola)
- Ha Letlaka
- Ha Lika
- Ha Loti
- Ha Majara
- Ha Makeleli
- Ha Makepe
- Ha Makhoa
- Ha Makhoaba (Menkhoaneng)
- Ha Mali
- Ha Mamafofo
- Ha Matube
- Ha Moahloli
- Ha Mohale
- Ha Molotha
- Ha Montso
- Ha Motsarapane
- Ha Nkhasi
- Ha Nkopa
- Ha Ntja
- Ha Ntsoakele
- Ha Peete (Seqhobong)
- Ha Pentši
- Ha Phalole
- Ha Puseletso (Hlobola)
- Ha Qobete (Litsiphong)
- Ha Ramabele
- Ha Sebaka (Botsola)
- Ha Sekere
- Ha Sekolotsa (Menkhoaneng)
- Ha Selebalo ('Mate)
- Ha Sepenya
- Ha Seqhoang
- Ha Seturumane
- Ha Thella
- Ha Tjotji
- Ha Tlali
- Hata-Butle
- Hata-Butle (Botsola)
- Hlokoa-Le-Monate
- Itsokolele
- Karammele
- Kholokoe
- Khopising (Ha Khabo)
- Konkotia
- Lepalole
- Libeleteng
- Lifoleing (Mabokong)
- Likileng
- Linotšing
- Liphaleng
- Mabokong
- Mafaleng
- Mafikeng
- Mahana-Puso
- Mahlabatheng
- Makanyaneng
- Makong
- Maliba-Matso
- Mapheaneng (Ha Khabo)
- Masianokeng
- Mate
- Matjana (Bothoba)
- Menkhoaneng
- Metolong
- Mohlakeng
- Mokoallong
- Nqobelle
- Phelandaba
- Phutha (Menkhoaneng)
- Saka-Lefubelu (Botsola)
- Sebolong
- Tau-Li-Ea-Rora
- Tau-Lia-Rora
- Teraeshareng
- Thabana-Tšooana
- Thopo (Mokoallong)
- Thotaneng (Ha Khabo)
- Thoteng
- Thoteng (Ha 'Mali)
- Tsieng (Ha Khabo)
- Tsitsa
