= Eugène Casalis =

Jean-Eugène Casalis (21 November 1812 in Orthez – 9 March 1891 in Paris) was a French Protestant missionary, ethnographer of Lesotho, and specialist in the Setswana language. He founded the Protestant missions in Basutoland for twenty-two years and directed the Paris Mission House for the next twenty-five years.

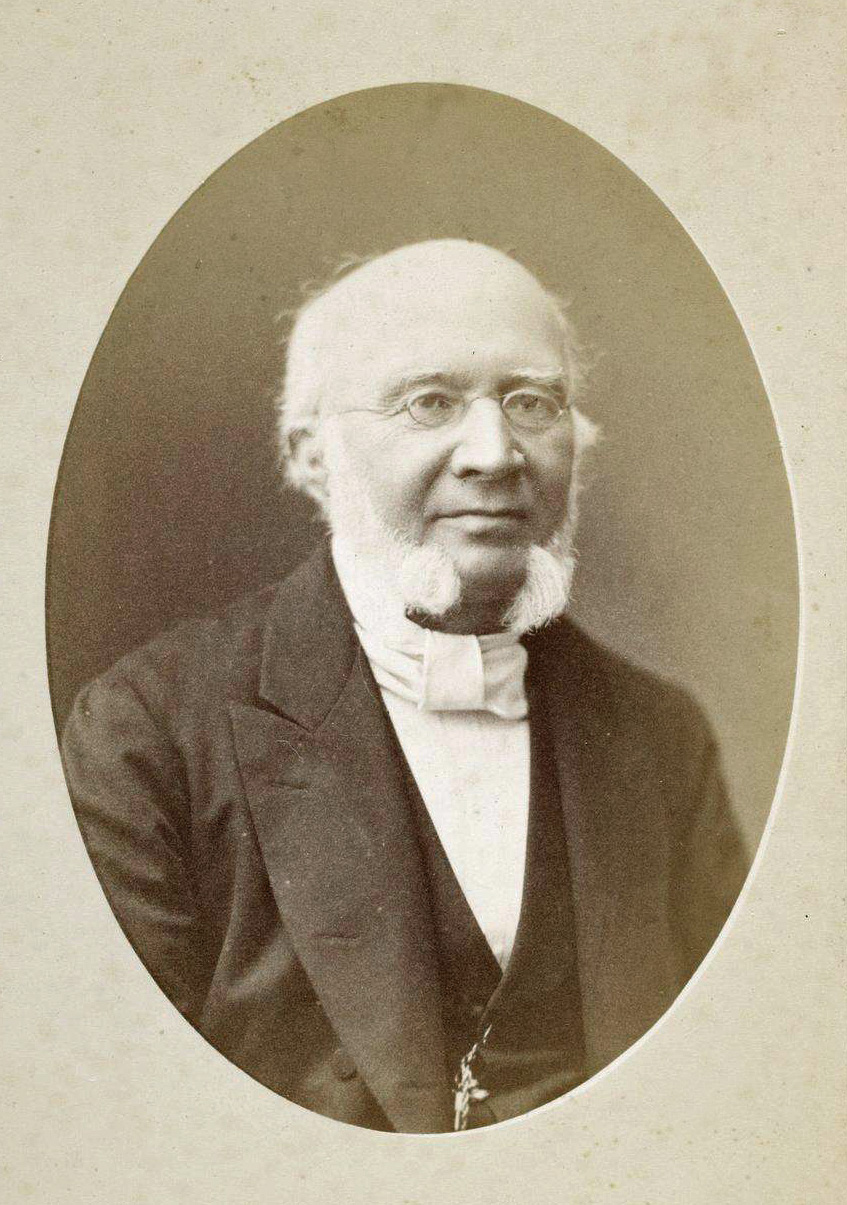
Eugene Casalis

== Childhood and youth ==
Eugène Casalis was born on November 21, 1812, into an old bourgeois Huguenot family in Orthez, Pyrénées-Atlantiques. He was the second son of Arnaud Casalis and Marthe-Benjamine Labourette. As a teenager, he was deeply influenced by the testimony of a leading figure of the Revival movement of the early 19th century, the Swiss evangelical pastor Henri Pyt, sent to the Pyrénées-Atlantiques by the Continental Society of Geneva.

Eugène Casalis, determined to become a missionary, studied at the mission house of the Paris Evangelical Missionary Society in 1830. He was ordained a missionary on October 18, 1832, at the Protestant temple of the Marais.

== On a mission ==
The Paris Evangelical Mission Society (SMEP) had initially planned to send Eugène Casalis and two students, Constant Gosselin and Thomas Arbousset, to Algeria. It had therefore asked them to learn Arabic and study the Koran. However, they were forced to abandon this project in the face of the refusal of any evangelization of Algeria by the French military authorities, so as not to upset the religious leaders they wanted to rally. The SMEP then decided to send them to Bechuanaland to reinforce a first missionary team, sent in 1829, composed of Prosper Lemue, Isaac Bisseux and Samuel Rolland.

They left Gravesend, Kent, on 11 November 1832 on a British brig. Arriving at the Cape in February 1833, the three missionaries were dissuaded by Lemue and Rolland from going to Bechuanaland, where unrest was causing population migrations that made any evangelisation impossible.

It was then that they were approached by a Mosotho "mulatto" hunter sent by the king of what was then called Basutoland, Moshoeshoe I, who wanted "benevolent white people" to come to his kingdom.

Arbousset, Gosselin and Casalis accepted the proposal and arrived in early June 1833 at Thaba Bosiu, the capital of the Basotho kingdom, located in the mountains. They were warmly welcomed by Moshoeshoe and agreed on two locations for the missions: one near the capital, the other on the plain, thirty kilometers from Thaba Bosiu, in a place that was named Morija in July 1833. This mission station was to become the center of French Protestant missionary activity in Basutoland, with a temple, schools, a printing press and a hospital.

In 1837, at the request of King Moshoeshoe, Eugene Casalis left Morija to settle near Thaba Bosiu. Having a very good relationship with the king, he quickly became his spiritual and political advisor, so to speak, his minister of foreign affairs. He advised the king to approach the English and seek their protection in order to prevent the invasion of part of his country by Boer farmers. The negotiations resulted in the signing of the so-called Treaty of Napier.

In 1838, Eugène Casalis married Sarah Dyke, daughter of a Scottish merchant established in the colony, at Cape Town. The couple had six children, born in Lesotho.

In June 1849, he returned to France to raise funds. The economic crisis that preceded the 1848 Revolution had severely affected the finances of the SMEP, which had been forced to close the Maison des missions in Paris and several mission stations in Basutoland; the missionaries were no longer being paid. Protestantism was going through a period of theological crisis, divided between liberal Protestants and "orthodox/evangelicals." The Mission remained a link between the two groups. Casalis's tour was a great success because he was the first missionary to return to his country to bear witness.

Returning to Basutoland fifteen months later, Eugène Casalis discovered that his plans were in dire straits. Since his departure, many converts had returned to their previous practices and relations with the English had only worsened. This situation worsened in the following years, with the English even invading Basutoland in 1855. Although victorious in all the battles, Moshoeshoe, advised once again by Casalis, accepted the negotiation which resulted in an armistice between the Cape Colony and the sovereign state of Basutoland.

In 1855, after four more years in Basutoland, Eugène Casalis left the country for good at a critical time, as the Boers and the English were increasingly threatening Basutoland. Sarah Casalis died in 1854, and Eugène remarried in February 1859 to Sophie Bourgeoix; the couple had five children.

Eugène Casalis was recalled to Paris to direct the reopened Maison des missions. He assumed the role of director of the Société des missions, while also serving as pastor of the Reformed Church of Passy-Annonciation in Paris, until 1878, when he was first assisted, then replaced when he resigned in 1882, by Pastor Alfred Boegner. He was made a Knight of the Legion of Honour in 1885.

Eugène Casalis died in Paris on March 9, 1891.

== Ethnographer and linguist ==
The three missionaries translated the Gospels and around fifty chapters of the Bible into the Setswana language.

In 1841, Eugène Casalis published an attempt to establish the Sichuan language and grammar (Studies on the Sichuan Language). After his definitive return to France, Eugène Casalis published in 1859 Les Basoutos, ou vingt-trois années d’études et d’observations au Sud de l’Afrique, a pioneering work of ethnography that does not fit into the style of the explorers of the time.

== Publications ==
- Études sur la langue séchuana, Paris, Imprimerie royale, 1841, 103 p., reproduit en 1974 par INALCO/AUPELF, Paris (microfiches)
- Notice biographique sur la vie, la conversion et la mort de Manoah, membre de l'Église de Thaba-Bossiou, chez les Béchuanas-Bassoutos (Afrique méridionale), Société des missions évangeliques de Paris, J. Smith, Paris, 1843, 12 p., available at Gallica
- Les Bassoutos, ou vingt-trois années d'études et d'observations au Sud de l'Afrique, Paris, Société des missions évangéliques, 1859 (traduit en anglais par l'auteur en 1861), available at Gallica, réédité en 2012 par le CEPB avec une présentation de Jean-François Zorn.
- Mes souvenirs, Paris, Fischbacher, 1886, 4e édition, 344 p., available at Gallica

== See also ==
- Histoire du Lesotho
- François Coillard
- Georges Casalis

== Bibliography ==
- Zohra Ait Abdemalek, Protestants en Algérie, Le protestantisme et son action missionnaire en Algérie aux XIXe et XXe siècles, Éditions Olivétan, 2004, ISBN 978-2-915245-17-2.
- Bach, Daniel C. (1990). La France et l'Afrique du Sud, Histoire, mythes et enjeux contemporains (in French). Paris/Nairobi: Credu-Karthala. p. 432. ISBN 2-86537-269-3..
- Blandenier, Jacques (2003). L'essor des missions protestantes (in French). Vol. 2. Nogent-sur-Marne/Saint-Légier (Suisse): Institut biblique de Nogent et Emmaüs. p. 621. ISBN 2-903100-32-2..
- Encrevé, André (1992). Les protestants (in French). Paris: Beauchesne. p. 534. ISBN 2-7010-1261-9..
- Hélène Lanusse-Cazalé (éd.), Une amitié protestante : lettres d'Eugène Casalis à Joseph Nogaret, 1830-1888, Éditions Cairn, Pau, 2014, 247 p. ISBN 978-2-35068-360-7
- Marie-Claude Mosimann-Barbier, Un Béarnais en Afrique australe ou l'extraordinaire destin d'Eugène Casalis, L'Harmattan, 2012, ISBN 978-2-296-99257-3
- Marie-Claude Mosimann-Barbier et Michel Prum (dir.), Missions et colonialisme : le Lesotho à l'heure du bicentenaire d'Eugène Casalis, L'Harmattan, Paris, 2013, 246 p. ISBN 978-2-343-01289-6 (colloque international de Morija, Lesotho, octobre 2012)
- Alain Ricard, Eugène Casalis, voyageur et ethnographe (1859): Les Bassoutos, ou 23 années d'études et d'observations au sud de l'Afrique (http://hal.archives-ouvertes.fr/docs/00/11/25/65/PDF/casaexplo.pdf).
- Alain Ricard, Eugène Casalis, les Bassoutos, la poésie…, communication présentée à la journée sur l'éthnologie à Bordeaux, le jeudi 10 mars 1994, Université de Bordeaux 2, (http://hal.archives-ouvertes.fr/docs/00/10/58/33/PDF/casalis.pdf).
- Jean-François Zorn, « Eugène Casalis », in Patrick Cabanel et André Encrevé (dir.), Dictionnaire biographique des protestants français de 1787 à nos jours, tome 1 : A-C, Les Éditions de Paris Max Chaleil, Paris, 2015, p. 589-590 ISBN 978-2846211901
