= Thomas Arbousset =

Jean Thomas Arbousset (January in 13, 1810, Pignan – September 29, 1877 at Saint-Sauvant) was a French Protestant pastor and missionary of the Society of Evangelical Missions of Paris. He exercised his ministry in Lesotho, Tahiti and then in Saint-Sauvant, in Vienne.

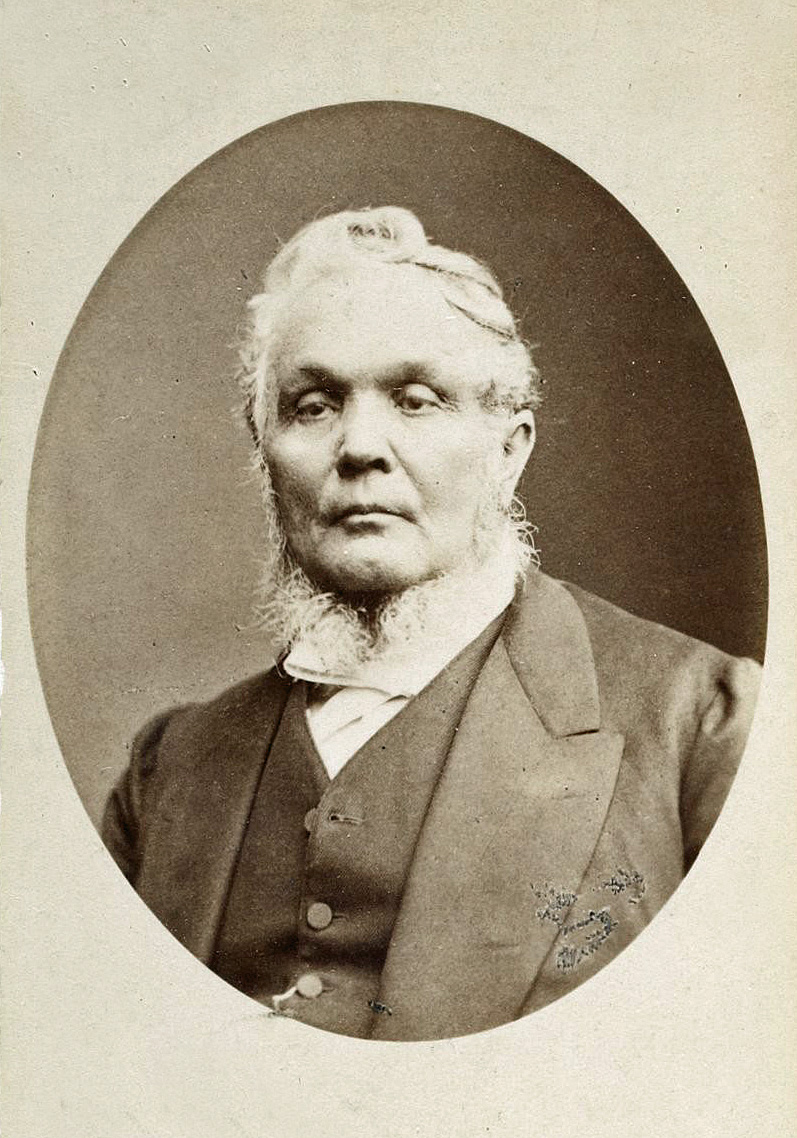
Jean Thomas Arbousset

== Biography ==
Born in Pignan, he decided to become a missionary and trained with Pastor Gachon in Mazères..

He studied at the Maison des missions de Paris at the end of 1829 and continued there until the summer of 1832, when he was consecrated. Eugène Casalis and Constant Gosselin were sent to southern Africa by the missionary, and they arrived in Cape Town at the end of February 1833. They created the mission among the Basotho, in present-day Lesotho. They advised and supported the Basotho during the Boer Wars, until they obtained British protection.

Thomas Arbousset lead explorations of the northern mountains and translated about fifty chapters of the Bible into the Setswana language . After twenty-seven years in Lesotho, he returned to France in 1860. His wife, Katherine Rogers, whom he married in 1837 in Cape Town, died on September 14, 1860 in the shipwreck from Aberconway to Falmouth, Cornwall. His eldest daughter Katherine Mariette (1847, Morija in Basotho, 1931, Bourges) being ill, Thomas Arbousset initially considered settling in Menton, but he agreed in 1867, at the request of the Missionary Society, to go to Tahiti, which was then a French protectorate. There he found a well-established church, created by English missionaries but in conflict with both Catholic missionaries and the French administration; his action seems to have been effective.

He returned to France at the end of 1865 and became pastor of the Reformed Church of Saint-Sauvant, where he found himself at odds with local conflicts between liberal Protestants and evangelicals. As a result, he was not granted tenure, on the pretext that he did not have a bachelor's degree in theology. The intervention of the Ministry of the Interior allowed him to be authorized to exercise his ministry in October 1866.

Thomas Arbousset died in 1877 at Saint-Sauvant.

== See also ==
- History of Lesotho

== Publications ==
- Relation d'un voyage d'exploration au nord-est de la colonie du Cap de Bonne-Espérance entrepris dans le mois de mars, avril et mai 1836 par MM. T. Arbousset et F. Daumas, missionnaires de la Société des Missions évangéliques de Paris, Arthus-Bertrand, Paris, 1842, p. 620, available at Gallica
- Tahiti et les îles adjacentes ; par Th. Arbousset. Voyages et séjour dans ces îles, de 1862 à 1865, Grassart, Paris, 1867, available at Gallica

== Sources ==
- Ambrose, D. A tentative history of Lesotho palaeontology. NUL Journal of Research (National University of Lesotho, Occasional Publication No. 1), 1991, 38p.
- Brutsch, A. Arbousset and the discovery of Mont-aux-Sources. Lesotho: Notes and Records, 1968, Vol. 7, pp. 49-56.
- Dictionary of South African biography, Vol. 1, 1968.
- Dreyer, J. Thomas Arbousset and Francois Daumas in the Free State: tracing the exploratory tour of 1836. Southern African Humanities, 2001, Vol. 13, pp. 61-96.
- Du Plessis, J. A history of Christian missions in South Africa. London, 1911. Reprinted Cape Town: Struik, 1965.
- National Union Catalogue, pre-1956 imprints. London: Mansell, 1968-1980.
- Thomas Arbousset. In: Dictionary of African Christian biography. http://www.dacb.org/stories/lesotho/arbousset_thomas.html as on 21 August 2015.

=== Bibliography ===
- Daniel C. Bach, La France et l’Afrique du Sud, Histoire, mythes et enjeux contemporains, Credu-Karthala, 1990 ISBN 2-86537-269-3.
- Jacques Blandenier, L’essor des missions protestantes ; volume 2 : du XIXe siècle au milieu du XXe siècle, Éditions de l’Institut biblique de Nogent et Emmaüs, 2003 ISBN 2-903100-32-2.
- Henri Clavier, Thomas Arbousset, Étude historique, Recherche historique sur son milieu, sa personnalité, son œuvre, parallèle avec Livingstone, Société des Missions Évangéliques, Paris, 1965.
- Daniel Robert, « Jean Thomas Arbousset », dans André Encrevé (dir.), Dictionnaire du monde religieux dans la France contemporaine. 5 Les Protestants, Paris, Beauchesne, 1993 (ISBN 2701012619), p. 49-50.
- Marc Spindler, « Thomas Arbousset », in Patrick Cabanel et André Encrevé (dir.), Dictionnaire biographique des protestants français de 1787 à nos jours, tome 1 : A-C, Les Éditions de Paris Max Chaleil, Paris, 2015, p. 79-80 ISBN 978-2846211901
