= Taung tribe =

Tribe of Bantu origin

The Taung tribe or Bataung is a tribe of Bantu origin which speaks the Sotho-Tswana group of languages, namely, Setswana, Sepedi, Sesotho and Lozi. The tribe was established by Makraka, a headman.

After an unsuccessful cattle raid, some members of the tribe were "massacred".

"Tau" is a Sotho-Tswana word meaning "Lion", and this animal is their totem. "Bataung" is a plurality of a lion meaning "people of a place of Lions or Lion's den".

== See also ==
- Barotseland
