= George Cathcart =

British general and diplomat (1794–1854)

Major-General The Honourable Sir George Cathcart KCB
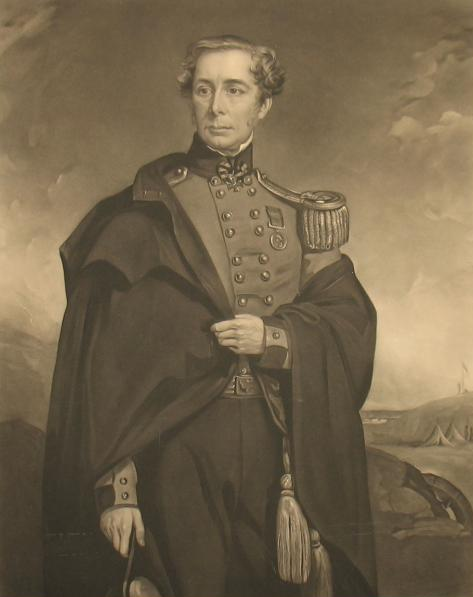
- Born: 12 May 1794; Renfrewshire, Scotland
- Died: 5 November 1854 (aged 60); Inkerman, Russian Empire
- Burial place: British Cemetery in Sevastopol
- Spouse: Lady Georgiana Greville
- Military career
- Allegiance: United Kingdom
- Branch: British Army
- Service years: 1810–1854
- Rank: Major-General
- Commands: 4th Division
- Conflicts: Napoleonic Wars; Battle of Copenhagen; Hundred Days; Battle of Quatre Bras; Battle of Waterloo; Eighth Xhosa War; Battle of Berea; Crimean War; Battle of Inkerman †
- Awards: Knight Grand Cross of the Order of the Bath

Major-General Sir George Cathcart KCB (12 May 1794 – 5 November 1854) was a Scottish general of the British Army and diplomat.

== Military career ==
Cathcart was born in Renfrewshire, a younger son of William Cathcart, 1st Earl Cathcart.

After receiving his education at Eton and in Edinburgh, in 1810 he purchased a commission in the Life Guards regiment. In 1813 he went to Russia to serve as aide-de-camp to his father, who was ambassador and military commissioner. George Cathcart was present at the battles between the Russian and the French armies in 1813 and he followed the Russian Army through Europe and entered Paris in March 1814.

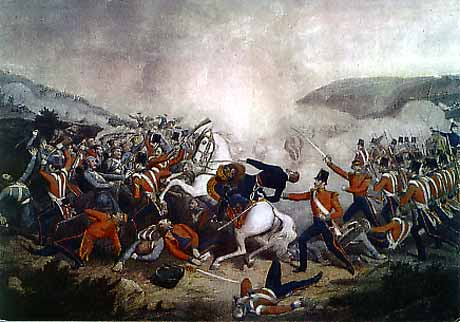
General Cathcart death at Inkerman

When Napoleon returned in 1815, Cathcart served as aide-de-camp to the Duke of Wellington and was present at the battles of Quatre Bras and Waterloo. After the war he was commissioned in the 7th Hussars, promoted to lieutenant-colonel in 1826. He then joined the 57th Regiment in 1828, the 8th Hussars in 1830 and the 1st Dragoon Guards in 1838. Cathcart was promoted to colonel in 1841, and on 11 November 1851 was promoted to major-general.

In 1852 to 1853, as Governor of the Cape of Good Hope, he granted the first constitution to the colony that ended the 8th Cape Frontier War, and defeated the Basutos at the Battle of Berea. In July 1853 Cathcart was invested as a Knight Commander of the Order of the Bath (KCB).

In 1853 he was appointed Adjutant-General to the Forces, and he left the Cape in April 1854.

At the start of the Crimean War, he was appointed to command the 4th Infantry Division. The British government gave him a "dormant commission" that was to be activated only if Lord Raglan were to be incapacitated. At the Battle of the Alma in September 1854, Cathcart's division saw no action and after the Battle of Balaclava, where his division was called into action, his dormant commission was revoked. He advised an infantry assault on Sevastopol, but was turned down by Lord Raglan.

He took command of the 1st Brigade during the Battle of Inkerman, where, after he was told to "Support the Guards", he led his men too far until he was shot through the heart while charging up a hill with a company of 50 men from the 20th Regiment of Foot on 5 November 1854.

== Personal life ==
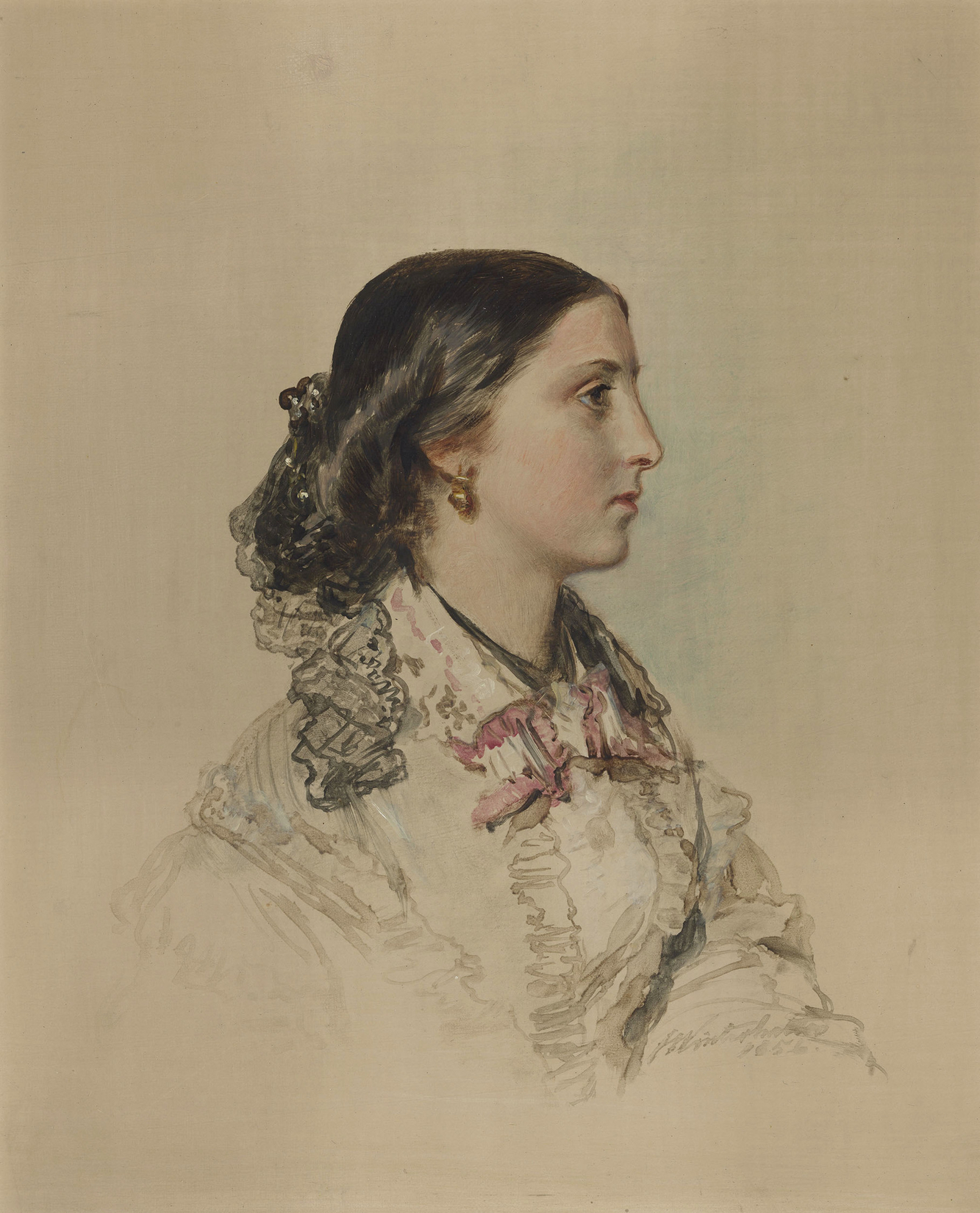
His daughter, Emily Cathcart (1834–1917) Royal Collection.

On 12 May 1824, Cathcart married his first and second cousin Lady Georgiana Greville (died 12 December 1871), daughter of Louisa Cathcart and Hon. Robert Fulke Greville. They had one son and seven daughters, who all died unmarried.

- Jane Cathcart (21 October 1825 – 23 March 1903)
- Louisa Margaret Cathcart (13 August 1827 – 12 March 1835)
- Georgiana Mary Cathcart (20 April 1829 – 7 June 1852)
- George Greville Cathcart (13 December 1832 – 12 May 1841)
- Alice Cathcart (7 September 1830 – 13 June 1855)
- Hon. Emily Sarah Cathcart (24 November 1834 – 16 February 1917), appointed Maid of Honour to the Queen in 1855 (giving her the courtesy rank of a baron's daughter), and later served as a Woman of the Bedchamber from 1880
- Louisa Cathcart (29 June 1839 – 25 June 1890)
- Anne Cathcart (23 October 1840 – 27 December 1917)

== Legacy ==
Cathcart, New South Wales, Australia is named after him.

== Bibliography ==
- George Cathcart, Commentaries on the War in Russia and Germany in 1812 and 1813, London: 1850.
- Cathcart, George (1857). Correspondence of Lieut.-General the Hon. Sir George Cathcart, K.C.B., relative to his military operations in Kaffraria. London: Murray. p. 401.

Government offices
Preceded by Sir Harry Smith	Governor of the Cape Colony; 1852–1853	Succeeded by Sir Charles Henry Darling acting
Military offices
Preceded by Sir George Brown	Adjutant General; 1853–1854	Succeeded by Sir George Wetherall
