= Eighth Xhosa War =

1850–1853 war between the British and Xhosa

- Part of the Xhosa Wars
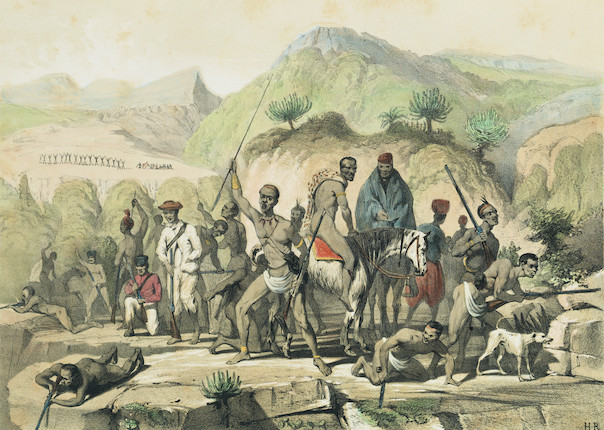
- Anti-British fighters defend a stronghold in the forested Water Kloof during the Eighth Xhosa War in 1851. Xhosa, Kat River Khoi-khoi and some army deserters are depicted
| Date | 1850–1853 |
| Location | Cape Colony frontier |
| Result | British victory |

Belligerents
| (United Kingdom) British Empire: Cape Colony | Xhosa tribes: Ngqika people; Khoikhoi forces: Cape Mounted Riflemen renegades |

Commanders and leaders
| (United Kingdom) Harry Smith (until 1852) (United Kingdom) George Cathcart (from 1852) | Chief Maqoma |

The Eighth Xhosa War was a war between the British Empire and Xhosa as well as Khoikhoi forces, between 1850 and 1853. It was the eighth of nine Xhosa Wars.

== Background ==
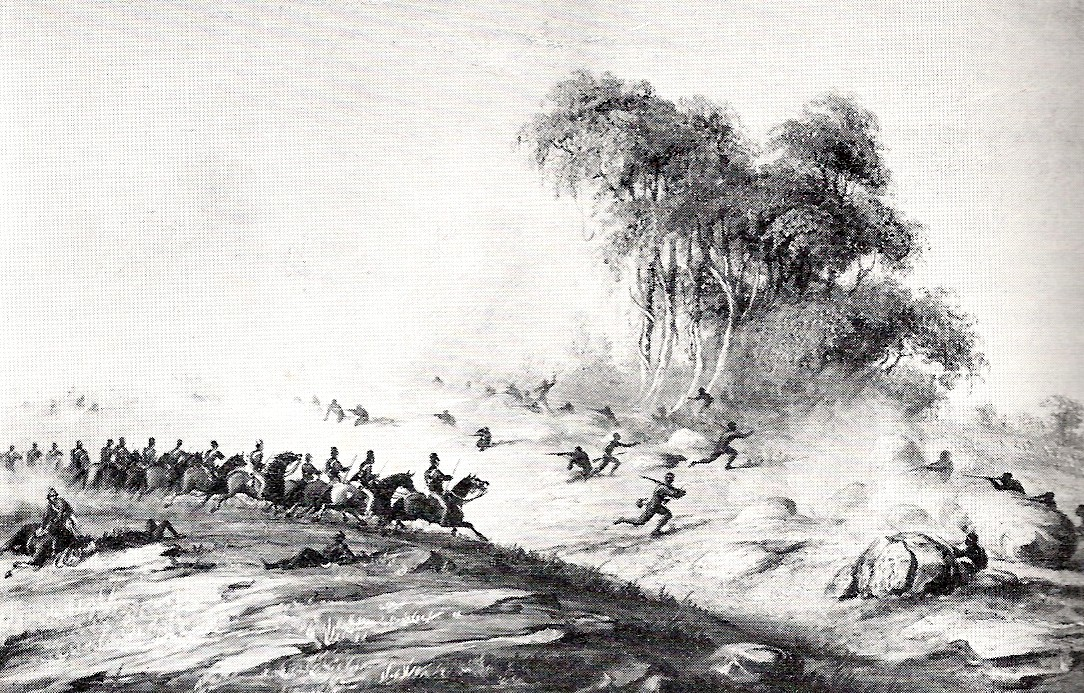
The Cape Mounted Riflemen charging the enemy at Waterkloof during the 8th Frontier War

Large numbers of Xhosa were displaced across the Keiskamma by Governor Harry Smith, and these refugees supplemented the original inhabitants there, causing overpopulation and hardship. Those Xhosa who remained in the colony were moved to towns and encouraged to adopt European lifestyles.

Harry Smith also attacked and annexed the independent Orange Free State, hanging the Boer resistance leaders, and in the process alienating the Burghers of the Cape Colony. To cover the mounting expenses he then imposed exorbitant taxes on the local people of the frontier and cut the Cape's standing forces to less than five thousand men.

In June 1850 there followed an unusually cold winter, together with an extreme drought. It was at this time that Smith ordered the displacement of large numbers of Xhosa squatters from the Kat River region.

The war became known as "Mlanjeni's War", after the prophet Mlanjeni who arose among the homeless Xhosa, and who predicted that the Xhosa would be unaffected by the colonists' bullets. Large numbers of Xhosa began leaving the colony's towns and mobilizing in the tribal areas.

== The Outbreak of War ==
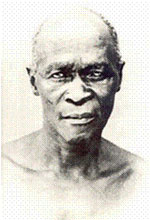
Chief Maqoma. Military commander in the 6th and 8th frontier wars

Believing that the chiefs were responsible for the unrest caused by Mlanjeni's preaching, Governor Sir Harry Smith travelled to meet with the prominent chiefs. When King Sandile kaNgqika refused to attend a meeting outside Fort Cox, Governor Smith deposed him and declared him a fugitive. On 24 December, a British detachment of 650 men under Colonel Mackinnon was ambushed by Xhosa warriors in the Boomah Pass. The party was forced to retreat to Fort White, under heavy fire from the Xhosa, having sustained forty-two casualties. The very next day, during Christmas festivities in towns throughout the border region, apparently friendly Xhosa entered the towns to partake in the festivities. At a given signal though, they fell upon the settlers who had invited them into their homes and killed them. With this attack, the bulk of the Ngqika joined the war.

== Opening Stages of the War ==
While the Governor was still at Fort Cox, the Xhosa forces advanced on the colony, isolating him there. The Xhosa burned British military villages along the frontier and captured the post at Line Drift. Meanwhile, the Khoi of the Blinkwater River Valley and Kat River Settlement revolted, under the leadership of a half-Khoi, half-Xhosa chief Hermanus Matroos, and managed to capture Fort Armstrong. Large numbers of the "Kaffir Police" — a paramilitary police force the British had established to combat cattle theft — deserted their posts and joined Xhosa war parties. For a while, it appeared that all of the Xhosa and Khoi people of the eastern Cape were taking up arms against the British.

Harry Smith finally fought his way out of Fort Cox with the help of the local Cape Mounted Riflemen, but found that he had alienated most of his local allies. His policies had made enemies of the Burghers and Boer Commandos, the Fengu, and the Khoi, who formed much of the Cape's local defences. Disaffection about their treatment by the English authorities even spread among the traditionally loyal Cape Mounted Riflemen, with some units of Khoi descent defecting to the Xhosa rebels.

== The British Counter-Attack (January 1851) ==
After these initial successes, however, the Xhosa experienced a series of setbacks. Xhosa forces were repulsed in separate attacks on Fort White and Fort Hare. Similarly, on 7 January, Hermanus and his supporters launched an offensive on the town of Fort Beaufort, which was defended by a small detachment of troops and local volunteers. The attack failed however, and Hermanus was killed. The Cape Government also eventually agreed to levy a force of local gunmen (predominantly Khoi) to hold the frontier, allowing Smith to free some imperial troops for offensive action.

By the end of January, the British were beginning to receive reinforcements (2nd Division) from Cape Town and a force under Colonel Mackinnon was able to drive north from King William's Town to resupply the beleaguered garrisons at Fort White, Fort Cox and Fort Hare. With fresh men and supplies, the British expelled the remainder of Hermanus' rebel forces (now under the command of Willem Uithaalder) from Fort Armstrong and drove them west toward the Amatola Mountains. Over the coming months, increasing numbers of Imperial troops arrived, reinforcing the heavily outnumbered British and allowing Smith to lead sweeps across the frontier country.

In 1852, HMS Birkenhead was wrecked at Gansbaai while bringing reinforcements to the war at the request of Sir Harry Smith. As the ship sank, the men (mostly new recruits) stood silently in rank, while the women and children were loaded into the lifeboats. They remained in rank as the ship slipped under and over 300 died.

== Conclusion ==
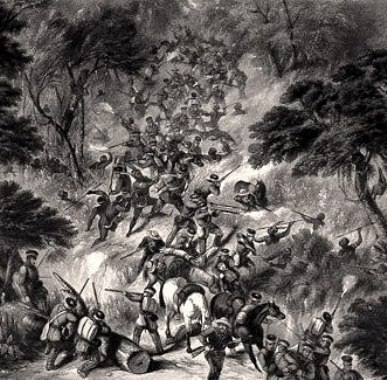
A British column (74th Highlanders) under attack in the Waterkloof forests

Maqoma and his forces established themselves in the forested Waterkloof. From this base they managed to plunder surrounding farms and torch the homesteads. Maqoma's stronghold was situated on Mount Misery, a natural fortress on a narrow neck wedged between the Waterkloof and Harry's Kloof. The Waterkloof conflicts lasted two years. Maqoma also led an attack on Fort Fordyce and inflicted heavy losses on the forces of Sir Harry Smith.

In February 1852, the British Government decided that Sir Harry Smith's inept rule had been responsible for much of the violence, and ordered him replaced by George Cathcart, who took charge in March. For the last six months, Cathcart ordered scourings of the countryside for rebels. In February 1853, Sandile and the other chiefs surrendered.

The 8th frontier war was the most bitter and brutal in the series of Xhosa wars. It lasted over two years and ended in the complete subjugation of the Ciskei Xhosa.

== Bibliography ==
- Abbink, J; Bruijn, Mirjam de; Walraven, Klaas van (2008). Rethinking Resistance: Revolt and Violence in African History. LULE. ISBN 978-9004126244.
- Abbink, J; Peires, Jeffrey (1989). The Dead Will Arise: Nongqawuse and the Great Xhosa Cattle-Killing. LULE. ISBN 9780253205247.
- Osterhammel, Jürgen (2015). The Transformation of the World: A Global History of the Nineteenth Century. Translated by Patrick Camiller. Princeton, New Jersey; Oxford: Princeton University Press. ISBN 978-0691169804.
- Knight, Ian (2005) [1st pub. 1989]. Queen Victoria's Enemies (1): Southern Africa (5th ed.). Oxford: Osprey Publishing. ISBN 978-0850459012.
