= List of heritage sites in Free State =

This is a list of the heritage sites in the Free State in South Africa, as recognized by the South African Heritage Resources Agency.

SAHRA identifier	Site name	Description	Town	District	NHRA status	Coordinates	Image
2/0/BEH/6	1 Olivier Street, Kestell, Bethlehem District		Kestell	Bethlehem	Register	28°18′42″S 28°42′14″E	Upload Photo
9/2/300/0001	Farmhouse and outbuildings, Wolhuterskop-Zuid, Bethlehem District	Type of site: Farmstead. Current use: Tourism. The original portion of the sandstone homestead was erected in about 1850 by Philip Roedolf Fourie, the first owner of Wolhuterskop. Once restored, the homestead, outbuildings, and cemetery served as an example of a typical Free State farm layout.		Bethlehem	Provisional Protection	28°15′30″S 28°18′00″E	Upload Photo
9/2/300/0003	2 Olivier Street, Kestell, Bethlehem District	Type of site: House. Current and previous use: Dwelling-house. Erected by Dr. Andrew Craig Hunter, who bought the property in 1911 from John Pringle Cooke.	Kestell	Bethlehem	Provincial Heritage Site	28°18′42″S 28°42′12″E	Upload Photo
9/2/300/0004	Wooden Spoon Braai restaurant, 12 Church Street, Bethlehem	The building features a distinctive architectural style that incorporates both sandstone and bluestone. This 'Tuishuisie' is the oldest existing building in Bethlehem and was built in 1874 by Mr Johannes Blignaut. Type of site: Commercial. Previous use: Retail.	Bethlehem	Bethlehem	Provincial Heritage Site	28°29′58″S 27°56′10″E	Upload Photo
9/2/300/0005	St Andrew's Presbyterian Church, 144 Cambridge Street, Bethlehem	Type of site: Church. Current use: Church. This sandstone building is typical of the English church architecture found earlier in most of the Free State.	Bethlehem	Bethlehem	Provincial Heritage Site	28°18′15″S 28°14′01″E	Upload Photo
9/2/300/0006	Preekstoelrots, Narwanda, Bethlehem District	This rock derives its name from its distinctive form.		Bethlehem	Provincial Heritage Site	28°27′15″S 26°47′48″E	Upload Photo
9/2/300/0008	A B Baartman Wagon House, Muller and Landdros Streets, Bethlehem	This sandstone wagon-house, with its high-pitched iron roof and loft, was erected in 1894 by A. A. Baartman, a wagon and cart builder. The adjacent outbuildings were added after the Anglo-Boer War (1899–1902). Type of site: House. Previous use: Wagon-house. Current use: Museum.	Bethlehem	Bethlehem	Provincial Heritage Site	28°13′55″S 28°18′58″E	Upload Photo
9/2/300/0009	Nederduitse Gereformeerde Mother Church, Church Square, Bethlehem	The cornerstone of this sandstone church building, which was designed by the Revd. J. D. Kestell was laid by President M. T. Steyn on 12 April 1910. The church was inaugurated on 18 February 1911. The Basuto War (1865–66) Memorial was erected. The cornerstone of this sandstone church building, which was designed by the Revd. J. D. Kestell was laid by President M. T. Steyn on 12 April 1910.	Bethlehem	Bethlehem	Provincial Heritage Site	28°14′02″S 28°18′39″E	The cornerstone of this sandstone church building, which was designed by the Revd. J. D. Kestell was laid by President M. T. Steyn on 12 April 1910. The church was inaugurated on 18 February 1911. The Basuto War (1865–66) Memorial was erected. The cornerstone of this sandstone church building, which was designed by the Revd. J. D. Kestell was laid by President M. T. Steyn on 12 April 1910.
9/2/300/0010	14 President Burgers Street, Bethlehem	A plastered brick house with a pitched corrugated iron roof. It has a corrugated iron veranda. The original portion of the house was built just after the Anglo-Boer War (1899-1902). Type of site: Commercial / residential. Previous use: House. Current use: Restaurant. This cottage is a typical example of a townhouse at the turn of the century.	Bethlehem	Bethlehem	Provincial Heritage Site	28°14′12″S 28°18′40″E	Upload Photo
9/2/300/0013	St Augustine Anglican Church, 34 Louw Street, Bethlehem	Sandstone building with tile roof and sandstone buttresses against walls. Sandstone apse on eastern. The cornerstone of the building was laid on 1928-02-29 by Rev. George Belbin. This church was completed on 1928-08-26	Bethlehem	Bethlehem	Provincial Heritage Site	28°18′34″S 28°14′06″E	Upload Photo
9/2/300/0016	Nederduitse Gereformeerde Church, Van Riebeeck Street, Kestell, Bethlehem District	This sandstone church with a corrugated iron roof has Byzantine and Neoclassical elements. This was designed by the architect Gerhard Moerdyk and erected by the builder F. Barker. This church is one of the largest stone churches in South Africa.	Kestell	Bethlehem	Provincial Heritage Site	28°18′35″S 28°42′11″E	This sandstone church with a corrugated iron roof has Byzantine and Neoclassical elements. This was designed by the architect Gerhard Moerdyk and erected by the builder F. Barker. This church is one of the largest stone churches in South Africa.
9/2/300/0017	Strapp's Shop, 18 Church Street, Bethlehem	This Victorian shop of sandstone dates from the late nineteenth century. It forms an integral part of a building complex that includes the Old Magistrate's Office.	Bethlehem	Bethlehem	Provincial Heritage Site	28°14′05″S 28°18′35″E	This Victorian shop of sandstone dates from the late nineteenth century. It forms an integral part of a building complex that includes the Old Magistrate's Office.
9/2/300/0018	Pretoriuskloof Nature Reserve, Bethlehem	The nature reserve consists of two parts. One part is for visitors, and the other, Pretoriuskloof, is a nature reserve for birds and small game. The reserve is situated in the centre.	Bethlehem	Bethlehem	Provincial Heritage Site	28°14′28″S 28°18′36″E	Upload Photo
9/2/300/0018-001	Loch Athlone Dam Wall, Pretoriuskloof Nature Reserve, Bethlehem	Current use: Dam wall.	Bethlehem	Bethlehem	Provincial Heritage Site	28°15′01″S 28°18′32″E	Upload Photo
9/2/300/0019	Town Hall, 20-22 Muller Street, Bethlehem	Red brick building with tile roof and sandstone portico, quoining, foundation, window sills, and lintels. Tower on the south elevation. The cornerstones of the building were laid on 1993-01-30(???) by Councillor P Goble and the Administrator of the Orange Free State, C M T Wilcocks. The building contractor was John J Peddie. An additional wing was added to the north elevation in the 1950's. The red brick building with its sandstone detail, which was designed by F W Masey, was erected in 1930-1931.	Bethlehem	Bethlehem	Provincial Heritage Site	28°18′28″S 28°13′57″E	Red brick building with tile roof and sandstone portico, quoining, foundation, window sills, and lintels. Tower on the south elevation. The cornerstones of the building were laid on 1993-01-30(???) by Councillor P Goble and the Administrator of the Orange Free State, C M T Wilcocks. The building contractor was John J Peddie. An additional wing was added to the north elevation in the 1950's. The red brick building with its sandstone detail, which was designed by F W Masey, was erected in 1930-1931. Media related to Bethlehem, Free State Town Hall at Wikimedia Commons
9/2/300/0020	The Seminary, Wessels Street, Bethlehem	It is a two-storey building with plastered sandstone walls and a pitched corrugated iron roof. This impressive sandstone building was erected in 1894 by the Dutch-Reformed Church to house the girls' school known as the Seminary. Since 1903, the building has been used as a girls' hostel by the co-educational Government school, except for a period of Type of site: Educational. Previous use: School. Current use: Hostel. This impressive sandstone building was erected in 1894 by the Dutch-Reformed Church to house the girls' school known as the Seminary. Since 1903, the building has been used as a girls' hostel by the co-educational Government school, except for a period of	Bethlehem	Bethlehem	Provincial Heritage Site	28°14′16″S 28°18′41″E	Upload Photo
9/2/300/0021	Old Magistrate's Court, Louw Street, Bethlehem	This sandstone building, the cornerstone of which was laid on 16 January 1893 by F. W. Reitz, State President of the Orange Free State, is an example of an old Republican style of architecture, which was strongly influenced by the Renaissance. Type of site: Courthouse.	Bethlehem	Bethlehem	Provincial Heritage Site	28°14′07″S 28°18′35″E	Upload Photo
9/2/300/0023-001	Library, Market Street West, Clarens	Type of site: Library.	Clarens	Bethlehem	Register	28°30′53″S 28°25′13″E	Upload Photo
9/2/300/0023-002	Methodist Church, Bester Street, Clarens	Type of site: Church.	Clarens	Bethlehem	Register	28°31′04″S 28°25′10″E	Type of site: Church.
9/2/300/0023-003	Nederduitse Gereformeerde Church, Main Street, Clarens	Type of site: Church.	Clarens	Bethlehem	Register	28°30′59″S 28°25′08″E	Type of site: Church.
9/2/300/0023-004	Primary school building, Main Street, Clarens	Type of site: School.	Clarens	Bethlehem	Register	28°31′10″S 28°24′56″E	Upload Photo
9/2/300/0026	Old Nederduitse Gereformeerde Mission Church, Muller Street, Bethlehem	The building is built of light sandstone and blue dolerite. The building is a typical example of the foundation stone of this church was laid on 22 December 1906, and the building was taken into use in 1909. It was only the second D.R. Mission Church to be erected in the Orange Free State. Type of site: Church. Previous use: Church. Current use: Museum. The foundation stone of this church was laid on 22 December 1906, and the building was taken into use in 1909. It was only the second D.R. Mission Church to be erected in the Orange Free State.	Bethlehem	Bethlehem	Provincial Heritage Site	28°13′53″S 28°18′55″E	The building is built of light sandstone and blue dolerite. The building is a typical example of the foundation stone of this church was laid on 22 December 1906, and the building was taken into use in 1909. It was only the second D.R. Mission Church to be erected in the Orange Free State. Type of site: Church. Previous use: Church. Current use: Museum. The foundation stone of this church was laid on 22 December 1906, and the building was taken into use in 1909. It was only the second D.R. Mission Church to be erected in the Orange Free State.
9/2/300/0031	Old Nederduitse Gereformeerde Mission Church parsonage, President Boshoff Street, Bethlehem	Type of site: Parsonage. The mission house derives its significance from its association with a religious figure, Rev. H.A. Roux, who established himself in 1899 at Bethlehem as the first missionary of the Dutch Reformed Church in the town.	Bethlehem	Bethlehem	Provincial Heritage Site	28°13′59″S 28°18′29″E	Upload Photo
9/2/300/0032	Main Building, Technical College Bethlehem, Wessels Street, Bethlehem	Type of site: Educational.	Bethlehem	Bethlehem	Provincial Heritage Site	28°14′18″S 28°18′27″E	Upload Photo
9/2/300/0033	Old Nederduitse Gereformeerde Church parsonage, Main Street, Clarens	Type of site: Parsonage.	Clarens	Bethlehem	Register	28°30′59″S 28°25′08″E	Upload Photo
9/2/301/0002	Concentration Camp Cemetery, Bethulie	The garden of remembrance is laid out with slates. It is surrounded by a trellis. It has a sandst. This cemetery contains the mortal remains of 1,737 women and children who died during the Anglo-Boer War (1899-1902) in the concentration camp at Bethulie. The cemetery, which was designed by J. do Toit, was inaugurated on 10 October 1966 by the then Stat. Type of site: Concentration Camp Cemetery. Current use: Cemetery.	Bethulie	Bethulie	Provincial Heritage Site	30°29′05″S 25°59′57″E	The garden of remembrance is laid out with slates. It is surrounded by a trellis. It has a sandst. This cemetery contains the mortal remains of 1,737 women and children who died during the Anglo-Boer War (1899-1902) in the concentration camp at Bethulie. The cemetery, which was designed by J. do Toit, was inaugurated on 10 October 1966 by the then Stat. Type of site: Concentration Camp Cemetery. Current use: Cemetery.
9/2/301/0007	Memorial and grave of Louw Wepener, Constantia, Bethulie District	The memorial is built out of sandstone. The memorial was erected in honour of Louw Wepener who had fight in the Basoeto War. In August 1865, Type of site: Grave, Memorial. Previous use: Memorial. Current use: Memorial.		Bethulie	Provincial Heritage Site	30°27′S 25°57′E	The memorial is built out of sandstone. The memorial was erected in honour of Louw Wepener who had fight in the Basoeto War. In August 1865, Type of site: Grave, Memorial. Previous use: Memorial. Current use: Memorial.
9/2/301/0009	Pellissier House Museum, Voortrekker Street, Bethulie	The middle part of the house has a pitched roof. The façade has a metal veranda that rests on iron pillars. This building was erected during the period 1834 to 1835 by the Rev. Jean Pierre Pellissier of the Paris Evangelical Missionary Society. It is one of the oldest existing buildings in the Orange Free State and dates from the period when missionary work was established. Type of site: House. Previous use: Personage. Current use: Museum. This building was erected during the period 1834 to 1835 by the Rev. Jean Pierre Pellissier of the Paris Evangelical Missionary Society. It is one of the oldest existing buildings in the Orange Free State and dates from the period when missionary work was established.	Bethulie	Bethulie	Provincial Heritage Site	30°29′38″S 25°58′31″E	The middle part of the house has a pitched roof. The façade has a metal veranda that rests on iron pillars. This building was erected during the period 1834 to 1835 by the Rev. Jean Pierre Pellissier of the Paris Evangelical Missionary Society. It is one of the oldest existing buildings in the Orange Free State and dates from the period when missionary work was established. Type of site: House. Previous use: Personage. Current use: Museum. This building was erected during the period 1834 to 1835 by the Rev. Jean Pierre Pellissier of the Paris Evangelical Missionary Society. It is one of the oldest existing buildings in the Orange Free State and dates from the period when missionary work was established. Media related to Pellissier House Museum at Wikimedia Commons
9/2/301/0013	Nederduitse Gereformeerde Church, Grey Street, Bethulie	It is a white T-shaped church with a grey painted pitched roof. In the middle of the façade is a tow. This impressive T-shaped church building with its Neo-Gothic features is one of the oldest existing Architectural styles. style: Neo-Gothic. Type of site: Church. Current use: Church.	Bethulie	Bethulie	Provincial Heritage Site	30°29′48″S 25°58′25″E	It is a white T-shaped church with a grey painted pitched roof. In the middle of the façade is a tow. This impressive T-shaped church building with its Neo-Gothic features is one of the oldest existing Architectural styles. style: Neo-Gothic. Type of site: Church. Current use: Church.
9/2/302/0001-001	Historic tree-garden, President Brand Street, Bloemfontein	It is trees planted in a garden. The trees in this garden serve as monuments to Pres. J.H. Brand, Lord Alfried Milner, and various others. Type of site: Garden.	Bloemfontein	Bloemfontein	Provincial Heritage Site	29°06′53″S 26°13′05″E	It is trees planted in a garden. The trees in this garden serve as monuments to Pres. J.H. Brand, Lord Alfried Milner, and various others. Type of site: Garden.
9/2/302/0001-005	First University Building, University of the Orange Free State, Bloemfontein	This small red-brick building was erected in the early 20th century to serve as additional classrooms for Grey College. From January 1904 to December 1907, the building served as the first headquarters of Grey University College. Type of site: University.	Bloemfontein, Universitas	Bloemfontein	Provincial Heritage Site	29°06′44″S 26°11′11″E	Upload Photo
9/2/302/0002-001	Sannaspos Battlefield, Ahmetnagher, Bloemfontein District	At this site along the Koringspruit, Gen. C. R. de Wet, Chief Commandant of the Orange Free State Commandos, outmanoeuvred the British forces under Brig. Gen. R. G. Broadwood on 31 March 1900. The military tactics displayed here by Gen. De Wet later became. Type of site: Battlefield.		Bloemfontein	Provincial Heritage Site	29°09′26″S 26°32′08″E	Upload Photo
9/2/302/0003	President Brand Street Conservation Area, Bloemfontein	Type of site: Conservation area.	Bloemfontein	Bloemfontein	Heritage Area	29°06′53″S 26°13′04″E	Upload Photo
9/2/302/0005	Archives Building, 37 Elizabeth Street, Bloemfontein	Type of site: Civic.	Bloemfontein	Bloemfontein	Provincial Heritage Site	29°06′57″S 26°12′53″E	Upload Photo
9/2/302/0006	Old Prison, Bloemfontein	Type of site: Gaol.	Bloemfontein	Bloemfontein	Register	29°07′00″S 26°13′00″E	Upload Photo
9/2/302/0007	Old Presidency, President Brand Street, Bloemfontein	This dignified presidential residence stands on Eunice Road, which is the extension of President Brand Street, just south of the Bloemspruit. Johan Nicolaas Brits built his simple 'hartbeeshuisie' about 300 metres from the spring, somewhere near the site of the presidency. When Henry Warden arrived, the British helped him build a 'kleihuis' for his residency on this site. Type of site: Residency.	Bloemfontein	Bloemfontein	Provincial Heritage Site	29°07′11″S 26°12′57″E	This dignified presidential residence stands on Eunice Road, which is the extension of President Brand Street, just south of the Bloemspruit. Johan Nicolaas Brits built his simple 'hartbeeshuisie' about 300 metres from the spring, somewhere near the site of the presidency. When Henry Warden arrived, the British helped him build a 'kleihuis' for his residency on this site. Type of site: Residency.
9/2/302/0010	Tweetoring Church, Charles Street, Bloemfontein	The church is built in a modern Roman style. It has two towers of 106 feet high. The Two Tower Church is closely connected with the historical past of the Orange Free State. The congregation was established in 1848, and on 6 May 1849, the Rev. Andrew Murray, Jr., was inducted as the first clergyman in the school building, which was used. Type of site: Church. Previous use: Church. Current use: Church.	Bloemfontein	Bloemfontein	Provincial Heritage Site	29°06′57″S 26°13′20″E	The church is built in a modern Roman style. It has two towers of 106 feet high. The Two Tower Church is closely connected with the historical past of the Orange Free State. The congregation was established in 1848, and on 6 May 1849, the Rev. Andrew Murray, Jr., was inducted as the first clergyman in the school building, which was used. Type of site: Church. Previous use: Church. Current use: Church.
9/2/302/0011	Military Museum Fort Bloemfontein, Church Street, Bloemfontein	The Queen's Fort, sometimes known as the Bloemfontein Fort, is situated to the south of the centre of the city. Partly hidden by large pine trees, it stands on a koppie to the left of Church Street, opposite the Basuto War Memorial. Previous use: Other: Aeroplane motor. Current use: Museum.	Bloemfontein	Bloemfontein	Provincial Heritage Site	29°07′29″S 26°13′18″E	The Queen's Fort, sometimes known as the Bloemfontein Fort, is situated to the south of the centre of the city. Partly hidden by large pine trees, it stands on a koppie to the left of Church Street, opposite the Basuto War Memorial. Previous use: Other: Aeroplane motor. Current use: Museum.
9/2/302/0013	Fichardt House, 40 Elizabeth Street, Bloemfontein	It is a double-storeyed building with orange-red stone bricks and a corrugated iron roof. The building was registered in 1896. C.G. Fichardt was responsible for the building. Architectural style: Queen Anne. Type of site: Commercial. Previous use: Clinic. Current use: Offices.	Bloemfontein	Bloemfontein	Provincial Heritage Site	29°06′56″S 26°12′57″E	Upload Photo
9/2/302/0014	Mapikela House, 1436 Maghoti Street, Batho, Bloemfontein	It is a red brick double-storey building with a pitched corrugated iron roof. There is a veranda with the building known as the Mapikela House, which is closely associated with its owner and builder, T.M. Mapi. Type of site: House. Current use: Residential. It was built in 1926 by Thomas Mtobi Mapikela. The house is of major historical importance because of its association with Mapikela, who was one of the founding fathers of the ANC.	Bloemfontein, Batho	Bloemfontein	Provisional Protection	29°08′16″S 26°13′22″E	Upload Photo
9/2/302/0016	Old Railway Bureau, Maitland Street, Bloemfontein	It is a double-storeyed brick building with Victorian and neoclassical characteristics. It was designed by the architect D. E. Wentink. The builder was H. Heath. The cornerstone was laid on 7 June 1898 by President M. T. Steyn. Architectural style: Victorian. Type of site: Commercial. Previous use: Other: Meeting place and offices.	Bloemfontein	Bloemfontein	Provincial Heritage Site	29°07′07″S 26°13′31″E	Upload Photo
9/2/302/0019	City Hall, President Brand Street, Bloemfontein	Double-storey sandstone building with tile roof. Twin towers on the front façade. Double timber doors and casement windows with timber shutters. The cornerstone of this impressive complex was laid on 27 February 1934 by Prince George, Duke of Kent. It was designed by Gordon Leith and erected by W. F. and P. du Plessis. The City Hall complex was officially opened on 4 December 1936. Type of site: City hall. Current use: City hall. The building was designed by Gordon Leith and erected in 1934-1936. It is of outstanding architectural and historical merit and forms part of one of the finest streetscapes in South Africa.	Bloemfontein	Bloemfontein	Provincial Heritage Site	29°06′51″S 26°13′00″E	Double-storey sandstone building with tile roof. Twin towers on the front façade. Double timber doors and casement windows with timber shutters. The cornerstone of this impressive complex was laid on 27 February 1934 by Prince George, Duke of Kent. It was designed by Gordon Leith and erected by W. F. and P. du Plessis. The City Hall complex was officially opened on 4 December 1936. Type of site: City hall. Current use: City hall. The building was designed by Gordon Leith and erected in 1934-1936. It is of outstanding architectural and historical merit and forms part of one of the finest streetscapes in South Africa. Media related to Bloemfontein City Hall at Wikimedia Commons
9/2/302/0022	Cathedral of St Andrew and St Michael, St George Street, Bloemfontein	Red brick building under a high-pitched corrugated iron roof. Red brick tower on the northern elevation. The cathedral is one of the oldest buildings in Bloemfontein. The original part of the building was completed in 1866. The plan of John R. Hilder for an extension of the building was. Architectural style: Gothic. Type of site: Cathedral. Current use: Church.	Bloemfontein	Bloemfontein	Provincial Heritage Site	29°07′17″S 26°13′01″E	Upload Photo
9/2/302/0023	Main Building, Bloemfontein Technical College, Douglas Street, Bloemfontein	It is a double-storeyed building with a red corrugated iron roof. The walls are white painted bricks. This imposing building with its Flemish features, which was designed by the architect W. H. Stucke, was erected in 1894/95 by the building contractor D. Godley. The foundation-stone was laid on 16 May 1894 by President F. W. Reitz. Architectural style: Flemish. Type of site: Educational. Previous use: School. Current use: College.	Bloemfontein	Bloemfontein	Provincial Heritage Site	29°07′14″S 26°13′18″E	Upload Photo
9/2/302/0024	Ramblers Club, Aliwal Street, Bloemfontein	Type of site: Club. The Ramblers Club is a fine example of Edwardian architecture from the late 19th and early 20th centuries, and is one of the best-known landmarks in Bloemfontein. The building, which was erected in 1907, was designed by the well-known Free State architect H G E de la Cornill.	Bloemfontein	Bloemfontein	Register	29°06′42″S 26°13′12″E	Type of site: Club. The Ramblers Club is a fine example of Edwardian architecture from the late 19th and early 20th centuries, and is one of the best-known landmarks in Bloemfontein. The building, which was erected in 1907, was designed by the well-known Free State architect H G E de la Cornill.
9/2/302/0026	Freshford House Museum, 31 Kellner Street, Bloemfontein	Double-storey red brick building with an a-simmetriese façade. The building has a veranda and a balcony. The building was completed in 1897. The Harrisons lived there until 1900. In 1902, the Government p. Architectural style: Edwardian. Type of site: Commercial. Previous use: Dwelling-house. Current use: Museum.	Bloemfontein, Westdene	Bloemfontein	Provincial Heritage Site	29°06′41″S 26°12′59″E	Double-storey red brick building with an a-simmetriese façade. The building has a veranda and a balcony. The building was completed in 1897. The Harrisons lived there until 1900. In 1902, the Government p. Architectural style: Edwardian. Type of site: Commercial. Previous use: Dwelling-house. Current use: Museum.
9/2/302/0027	Vierde Raadsaal, President Brand Street, Bloemfontein	The Fourth Raadsaal is the architectural jewel of the Free State. Built in the Renaissance style in which the most important features of the Greek and Roman styles are blended, it stands as a true monument. The last of the four Raadsaals of the Orange Free State Republic stands in President Brand Street. It is one of the buildings that lends particular distinction to that street. Architectural style: Neo-Renaissance. Type of site: Regional government. Current use: Parliament.	Bloemfontein	Bloemfontein	Provincial Heritage Site	29°06′56″S 26°13′02″E	The Fourth Raadsaal is the architectural jewel of the Free State. Built in the Renaissance style in which the most important features of the Greek and Roman styles are blended, it stands as a true monument. The last of the four Raadsaals of the Orange Free State Republic stands in President Brand Street. It is one of the buildings that lends particular distinction to that street. Architectural style: Neo-Renaissance. Type of site: Regional government. Current use: Parliament. Media related to Vierde Raadsaal at Wikimedia Commons
9/2/302/0028	Old Government Building, President Brand Street, Bloemfontein	The building has lattice work on three sides. It is 56 square feet big. It is two stories high. The Volksraad chamber was occupied on 1875-05-31. The building was completed in 1877. The Government Buildings was completed in 1877, although the Volksraad Chamber which was part of the building, had already been occupied on 31 May 1875. In 1895 the uppe Type of site: Government. Previous use: Offices. Current use: Other: Nasionale Afrikaanse Letterkundige Museum.	Bloemfontein	Bloemfontein	Provincial Heritage Site	29°07′00″S 26°13′00″E	The building has lattice work on three sides. It is 56 square feet big. It is two stories high. The Volksraad chamber was occupied on 1875-05-31. The building was completed in 1877. The Government Buildings was completed in 1877, although the Volksraad Chamber which was part of the building, had already been occupied on 31 May 1875. In 1895 the uppe Type of site: Government. Previous use: Offices. Current use: Other: Nasionale Afrikaanse Letterkundige Museum.
9/2/302/0029	Anglo-Boer War Blockhouse, Riverford, Bloemfontein District	Type of site: Blockhouse.		Bloemfontein	Provisional Protection	29°24′00″S 26°07′00″E	Upload Photo
9/2/302/0036	Eerste Raadsaal, 95 St Georges Street, Bloemfontein	This is a pioneer building with long white walls, a grass roof and two side façades. The First Raadsaal the most important building in the Orange Free State from a historical point of view. It stands at No. 95 St. George's Street in the picturesque, historical 'old' Bloemfontein, straight in front of the Presidency. Architectural style: Pioneer. Type of site: Commercial. Previous use: Church and school.	Bloemfontein	Bloemfontein	Provincial Heritage Site	29°07′13″S 26°13′00″E	This is a pioneer building with long white walls, a grass roof and two side façades. The First Raadsaal the most important building in the Orange Free State from a historical point of view. It stands at No. 95 St. George's Street in the picturesque, historical 'old' Bloemfontein, straight in front of the Presidency. Architectural style: Pioneer. Type of site: Commercial. Previous use: Church and school.
9/2/302/0037	Hertzog House Museum, 19 Goddard Street, Bloemfontein	This late Victorian house was erected in 1895. It was occupied from that date to 1928 by Gen. J B M Hertzog and his family. Architectural style: Victorian. Type of site: House. Previous use: House. Current use: Museum and offices.	Bloemfontein	Bloemfontein	Provincial Heritage Site	29°07′21″S 26°13′08″E	This late Victorian house was erected in 1895. It was occupied from that date to 1928 by Gen. J B M Hertzog and his family. Architectural style: Victorian. Type of site: House. Previous use: House. Current use: Museum and offices.
9/2/302/0039	Orange Free State Botanical Gardens, Bloemfontein	This botanical garden, which was established in 1967, is of particular scientific and environmental importance. It contains the only remaining karoo vegetation in the vicinity where palaeoclimates can be studied. Type of site: Botanical garden. Current use: Botanical garden.	Bloemfontein	Bloemfontein	Provincial Heritage Site	29°03′10″S 26°12′45″E	Upload Photo
9/2/302/0041	Gnome Aircraft Engine, Military Museum Fort Bloemfontein, Church Street, Bloemfontein	In the National Museum in Aliwal Street, Bloemfontein, is evidence of the beginning of the history of aviation in South Africa. The engine belonged to Maxi John L. Wes. It is the oldest aircraft engine in South Africa, and an important link in the history of aviation.	Bloemfontein	Bloemfontein	Heritage Object		Upload Photo
9/2/302/0042	Boom van sameswering, Onze Rust, Bloemfontein District	The 'Boom van sameswering' is a wild olive tree situated on the farm 'ONZE RUST' in the district of 'Onze Rust', the farm of Marthinus Theunis Steyn, the last President of the Orange Free State, lies just below a ridge, thickly wooded with Karee and wild olive trees. It is reached by a road that turns off the national road to the south at a point 22 kil Type of site: Tree.		Bloemfontein	Provincial Heritage Site	29°16′30″S 26°11′00″E	Upload Photo
9/2/302/0043	Arthur Nathan Swimming Pool, Fairview Street, Bloemfontein	The pool building has a pitched corrugated iron roof and is built of red brick which was plastered. Type of site: Swimming pool. Previous use: Recreational: swimming pool. Current use: Recreational: swimming pool. It is the largest swimming pool in South Africa.	Bloemfontein	Bloemfontein	Provincial Heritage Site	29°06′33″S 26°13′21″E	The pool building has a pitched corrugated iron roof and is built of red brick which was plastered. Type of site: Swimming pool. Previous use: Recreational: swimming pool. Current use: Recreational: swimming pool. It is the largest swimming pool in South Africa. Media related to Arthur Nathan Swimming Pool at Wikimedia Commons
9/2/302/0045	Women's Memorial, Monument Road, Bloemfontein	The obelisk is 36,5 metres in height and is built of Kroonstad sandstone. It is in memory of the 26,370 Boer women and children who died during the Anglo-Boer War (1899-1902). It was unveiled on 16 December 1913. Type of site: Memorial. Current use: Monument.	Bloemfontein	Bloemfontein	Provincial Heritage Site	29°08′30″S 26°12′30″E	The obelisk is 36,5 metres in height and is built of Kroonstad sandstone. It is in memory of the 26,370 Boer women and children who died during the Anglo-Boer War (1899-1902). It was unveiled on 16 December 1913. Type of site: Memorial. Current use: Monument. Media related to Women's Memorial, Bloemfontein at Wikimedia Commons
9/2/302/0049	Elizabeth le Roux Hostel, 99 Aliwal Street, Bloemfontein	The building has wood windows, old lamps, and border trellis work. The foundation-stone of the Elizabeth le Roux Hostel was laid in 1899. During the Anglo-Boer War the building was used as a hospital. In 1906 it was purchased by the first board of trustees of the Orange Girls High School. Pre Architectural style: Semi-Victorian. Type of site: House. Previous use: Other: military hospital. Current use: School.	Bloemfontein	Bloemfontein	Provincial Heritage Site	29°06′15″S 26°13′17″E	Upload Photo
9/2/302/0051	Hoffman Square, Bloemfontein	Type of site: Public open space.	Bloemfontein	Bloemfontein	Provisional Protection	29°07′05″S 26°13′19″E	Type of site: Public open space.
9/2/302/0056	Main building and Hamilton Hall, Grey College, Bloemfontein	The Hamilton Hall is a large double-storeyed building with similar pediment as the main building. The corner-stone of the main building of the Grey College complex was officially laid by President Reitz on 16 May 1894. The architect was W. H. Stucke. The Hamilton Hall, designed by Herbert Baker, was officially opened in 1907 by Sir Hamilton Gould-Adam. Type of site: Educational. Previous use: Hospital. Current use: School.	Bloemfontein, Park West	Bloemfontein	Provincial Heritage Site	29°06′46″S 26°11′49″E	The Hamilton Hall is a large double-storeyed building with similar pediment as the main building. The corner-stone of the main building of the Grey College complex was officially laid by President Reitz on 16 May 1894. The architect was W. H. Stucke. The Hamilton Hall, designed by Herbert Baker, was officially opened in 1907 by Sir Hamilton Gould-Adam. Type of site: Educational. Previous use: Hospital. Current use: School. Media related to Main building, Grey College at Wikimedia Commons
9/2/302/0057	Andrew Murray House, Grey College, Jock Meiring Street, Bloemfontein	It is a double-storeyed building with an orange-red tile roof. It has a façade on every corner. It h This building forms part of the historic core of Grey College. The building was designed by Frank Tay Type of site: House. Current use: Hostel.	Bloemfontein, Park West	Bloemfontein	Provincial Heritage Site	29°06′43″S 26°11′50″E	It is a double-storeyed building with an orange-red tile roof. It has a façade on every corner. It h This building forms part of the historic core of Grey College. The building was designed by Frank Tay Type of site: House. Current use: Hostel. Media related to Andrew Murray House, Grey College at Wikimedia Commons
9/2/302/0058	Brill House, Grey College, Jock Meiring Street, Bloemfontein	Double-storeyed building with an orange-red tile roof. On the corner is a façade made of sandstone. It was designed by Mr Frank Taylor and officially opened on 19 December 1907 by the Governor of the Type of site: House. Current use: Hostel. These three buildings form part of the historic core of Grey College, the oldest school in the Orange Free State. The buildings known as Brill House and Andrew Murray House were designed by Frank Taylor and officially opened on 19 December 1907 by the th	Bloemfontein, Park West	Bloemfontein	Provincial Heritage Site	29°06′47″S 26°11′49″E	Double-storeyed building with an orange-red tile roof. On the corner is a façade made of sandstone. It was designed by Mr Frank Taylor and officially opened on 19 December 1907 by the Governor of the Type of site: House. Current use: Hostel. These three buildings form part of the historic core of Grey College, the oldest school in the Orange Free State. The buildings known as Brill House and Andrew Murray House were designed by Frank Taylor and officially opened on 19 December 1907 by the th Media related to Brill House, Grey College at Wikimedia Commons
9/2/302/0059	Tuck shop, Grey College, Jock Meiring Street, Bloemfontein	Single storey corrugated iron and brick building with a pitched corrugated iron roof. Type of site: Educational. Previous use: Primary and secondary school. Current use: Primary and secondary school.	Bloemfontein, Park West	Bloemfontein	Provincial Heritage Site	29°06′44″S 26°11′52″E	Single storey corrugated iron and brick building with a pitched corrugated iron roof. Type of site: Educational. Previous use: Primary and secondary school. Current use: Primary and secondary school. Media related to Tuck Shop, Grey College at Wikimedia Commons
9/2/302/0063	Somerlust, 32 Whites Road, Waverley, Bloemfontein	Type of site: Residence.	Bloemfontein, Waverley	Bloemfontein	Register	29°05′25″S 26°13′40″E	Upload Photo
9/2/302/0064	Main Building, University of the Orange Free State, Bloemfontein	The cornerstone of this building with its neoclassical features was laid on 19 December 1907 by Sir Hamilton Goold-Adams. It was formally opened on 16 October 1909. The north and south wings date from 1915 and 1929, respectively. Type of site: Educational. The cornerstone of this building with its neoclassical features was laid on 19 December 1907 by Sir Hamilton Goold-Adams. It was formally opened on 16 October 1909. The north and south wings date from 1915 and 1929, respectively.	Bloemfontein, Universitas	Bloemfontein	Provincial Heritage Site	29°06′38″S 26°11′11″E	The cornerstone of this building with its neoclassical features was laid on 19 December 1907 by Sir Hamilton Goold-Adams. It was formally opened on 16 October 1909. The north and south wings date from 1915 and 1929, respectively. Type of site: Educational. The cornerstone of this building with its neoclassical features was laid on 19 December 1907 by Sir Hamilton Goold-Adams. It was formally opened on 16 October 1909. The north and south wings date from 1915 and 1929, respectively. Media related to Main Building, University of the Free State at Wikimedia Commons
9/2/302/0065	Station Building, Sannaspos Railway Station, Bloemfontein District	The station building is a long building made of sandstone. It has a stand-up roof made of metal tile. It was completed shortly before the Anglo-Boer War (1899–1902). It is one of only a few station buildings erected during the Republican period and forms an important link with the Orange Free State railway system. Type of site: Railway station. Previous use: Other: Sannaspos Battlefield.		Bloemfontein	Provincial Heritage Site	29°09′39″S 26°32′50″E	The station building is a long building made of sandstone. It has a stand-up roof made of metal tile. It was completed shortly before the Anglo-Boer War (1899–1902). It is one of only a few station buildings erected during the Republican period and forms an important link with the Orange Free State railway system. Type of site: Railway station. Previous use: Other: Sannaspos Battlefield.
9/2/302/0077	Green Lodge, 81 St Georges Street, Bloemfontein	The original core is considered the oldest building in Bloemfontein. The original portion of this dwelling dates from the 1840s and was built by Henry Green, assistant commissioner-general of the Orange River Sovereignty. The house was later occupied, among others; by the Rev. Andrew Murray, President M. T. Steyn's father. Type of site: Educational. Previous use: Parsonage. Current use: Other: Education centre.	Bloemfontein	Bloemfontein	Provincial Heritage Site	29°07′13″S 26°13′02″E	Upload Photo
9/2/302/0078	White Horse Stone, Naval Hill, Bloemfontein	0	Bloemfontein, Naval Hill	Bloemfontein	Provincial Heritage Site	29°05′59″S 26°14′21″E	Upload Photo
9/2/302/0079	Abraham Fischer House, University of the Orange Free State, Bloemfontein	It is a double-storeyed building with a stand roof of orange-red tiles. It has three extensions. It was designed by Frank Taylor and officially opened in 1909-08-16 by Abraham Fischer. It was one o Architectural style: Cape-Holland. Type of site: House. Current use: Hostel.	Bloemfontein, Universitas	Bloemfontein	Provincial Heritage Site	29°06′42″S 26°11′10″E	Upload Photo
9/2/303/0001	Paardeberg Battlefield, Boshof District	Type of site: Battlefield.		Boshof	Provincial Heritage Site	28°58′57″S 25°05′35″E	Upload Photo
9/2/303/0001/003	British military cemetery, Vendusiedrift, Boshof District	Type of site: Cemetery Military.		Boshof	Provincial Heritage Site	28°58′28″S 25°05′38″E	Upload Photo
9/2/303/0006	Site where General De Villebois-Mareuil was killed, Middelkuil, Boshof District	In 1892 De Villebois-Mareuil was the youngest colonel in the French Army. With the outbreak of the An .		Boshof	Provincial Heritage Site	28°40′00″S 25°17′30″E	Upload Photo
9/2/303/0009	Town Hall, Voortrekker Street, Boshof	Single storey plastered brick building with gables and high pitched corrugated iron roof. Ventilators on roof ridge. Corrugated iron lean-to verandahs with decorative iron pillars on front façade. Timber doors with arched fanlights and steel windows. Type of site: Town hall. Current use: Town hall. Forms part of town's history.	Boshof	Boshof	Register	28°32′19″S 25°14′20″E	Upload Photo
9/2/303/0011	Powder Magazine, Town Commonage, Boshof	This building has a low-pitched corrugated iron roof and an iron-and-timber door. The powder magazine, which was designed by the architect D E Wentink in September 1898, is an oblong building that was built of local dolerite stone. It was presumably erected with a view to the impending Anglo-Boer War of 1899 to 1902. Type of site: Powder magazine. Previous use: Powder magazine. Current use: none.	Boshof	Boshof	Provincial Heritage Site	28°32′31″S 25°14′03″E	Upload Photo
9/2/304/0001zz	Old police station and prison cells, President Street, Bothaville	Type of site: Prison, police station.	Bothaville	Bothaville	Register	27°23′19″S 26°36′35″E	Upload Photo
9/2/304/0002zz	Dutch Reformed Mother Church, President Street, Bothaville	This impressive cruciform church is built of sandstone. There is a tower in the middle of the front. This impressive cruciform church was designed by the architect Gerard Moerdyk and built of sandstone by the contractors Marshalt and Maclntrosh. The corner-stone was laid by Ds F. G. T. Radloff on 6 April 1918. Type of site: Church. Previous use: Church. Current use: Church.	Bothaville	Bothaville	Provincial Heritage Site	27°23′34″S 26°36′52″E	This impressive cruciform church is built of sandstone. There is a tower in the middle of the front. This impressive cruciform church was designed by the architect Gerard Moerdyk and built of sandstone by the contractors Marshalt and Maclntrosh. The corner-stone was laid by Ds F. G. T. Radloff on 6 April 1918. Type of site: Church. Previous use: Church. Current use: Church.
9/2/304/0003zz	Doornkraal Battlefield, Klipkraal, Bothaville District	Type of site: Battlefield.		Bothaville	Pending (Plaque)	27°28′39″S 26°35′40″E	Type of site: Battlefield.
9/2/304/0003zz	Concentration Camp Cemetery, Louvain 286, Brandfort District	Type of site: Concentration Camp Cemetery. cemetery contains the mortal remains of 1 263 women and children who died during the Anglo-Boer War		Brandfort	Provincial Heritage Site	27°28′39″S 26°35′40″E	Type of site: Concentration Camp Cemetery. cemetery contains the mortal remains of 1 263 women and children who died during the Anglo-Boer War
9/2/304/0004zz	Town Hall, Preller Street, Bothaville	Face brick building under hipped corrugated iron roof. Plastered cornices and pilasters. Sandstone plinth and window sills. Timber and steel doors and steel windows. The cornerstone of the building was laid on 4 March 1950 by the mayor of Bothaville, Dr T Meyer. The building contractor was G Sacchettoni. Architectural style: Modern. Type of site: Town hall. Current use: Town hall. The building, which was designed by J P Hulshof and erected in 1950, has intrinsic aesthetic/architectural merit.	Bothaville	Bothaville	Register	27°23′34″S 26°37′05″E	Upload Photo
9/2/304/0006zz	Old Nederduitse Gereformeerde Church Parsonage, 66 President Street, Bothaville	Type of site: Parsonage.	Bothaville	Bothaville	Register	27°23′28″S 26°36′47″E	Upload Photo
9/2/306/0001-001	Magistrates's Office, Voortrekker Street, Brandfort	Type of site: Magistrate's office.	Brandfort	Brandfort	Register	28°42′05″S 26°28′00″E	Upload Photo
9/2/306/0003	Concentration Camp Cemetery, Louvain, Brandfort District	The cemetery is surrounded with an iron trellis on a stone wall. It has a slated floor. This cemetery contains the remains of 1 263 women and children who died during the Anglo-Boer War (1899–1902) in the concentration camp at Brandfort. The cemetery, which was designed by J. du Toit, was officially opened on 22 September 1962. Type of site: Concentration camp cemetery. Current use: Graveyard.		Brandfort	Provincial Heritage Site	28°42′23″S 26°27′13″E	The cemetery is surrounded with an iron trellis on a stone wall. It has a slated floor. This cemetery contains the remains of 1 263 women and children who died during the Anglo-Boer War (1899–1902) in the concentration camp at Brandfort. The cemetery, which was designed by J. du Toit, was officially opened on 22 September 1962. Type of site: Concentration camp cemetery. Current use: Graveyard. Media related to Louvain Concentration Camp at Wikimedia Commons
9/2/308/0004	Farm House, Prynnsberg, Clocolan District	Type of site: Farm complex.	Clocolan	Clocolan	Provisional Protection	28°54′02″S 27°38′12″E	Upload Photo
9/2/308/0005	Town Hall, Andries Pretorius Street, Clocolan	Single storey sandstone building. Symmetrical front façade, ending in large Cape Dutch gable. Double pitched corrugated iron roof with ventilators on roof ridge. Sandstone extensions on side elevations with Cape Dutch gables. Timber doors and windows. The cornerstone of the building was laid on 15 November 1916 by the Mayor of Clocolan, Councillor T A Wilsenach. Type of site: Town hall. Current use: Town Hall. The building, which was erected in 1916-1917, is a fine example of a sandstone town hall. It contributes to the character of the street and is a landmark in town.	Clocolan	Clocolan	Register	28°54′51″S 27°34′01″E	Upload Photo
9/2/309/0004	Town Hall, Voortrekker Street, Dewetsdorp	Single storey plastered brick building. Double pitched corrugated iron roof with decorative ventilator. Symmetrical front façade with triangular pediment, pilasters and gable. Extensions with corrugated iron roofs on side and rear of the building. The building was rebuilt in 1928 after the previous town hall was destroyed by fire. Type of site: Town hall. Current use: Town hall. The building, which was erected in 1928, is a typical example of a town hall built in the Free State. It contributes to the character of the area and is a landmark in the town.	Dewetsdorp	Dewetsdorp	Register	29°35′00″S 26°39′52″E	Single storey plastered brick building. Double pitched corrugated iron roof with decorative ventilator. Symmetrical front façade with triangular pediment, pilasters and gable. Extensions with corrugated iron roofs on side and rear of the building. The building was rebuilt in 1928 after the previous town hall was destroyed by fire. Type of site: Town hall. Current use: Town hall. The building, which was erected in 1928, is a typical example of a town hall built in the Free State. It contributes to the character of the area and is a landmark in the town. Media related to Dewetsdorp Town Hall at Wikimedia Commons
9/2/309/0006	St Bartholomew Anglican Church, 27 van der Watt Street, Dewetsdorp	Plastered brick building with pitched corrugated iron roof and triangular end gables. Black-painted building-work on the church commenced on 18 August 1882. Type of site: Church. Current use: Church. This small plastered brick building, erected in 1882, is one of the oldest remaining Anglican Church buildings in the Free State. It serves as a fine example of the church buildings erected in the province during the previous century by the Anglican church.	Dewetsdorp	Dewetsdorp	Register	29°34′49″S 26°40′04″E	Upload Photo
9/2/310/0002	Church and School Buildings, Bethany Mission Complex, Edenburg District	Type of site: School. Current use: Mission complex.		Edenburg	Provisional Protection	29°36′23″S 25°57′39″E	Upload Photo
9/2/310/0007	Town Hall, Church Street, Edenburg	Single storey plastered brick building under pitched corrugated iron roof. Symmetrical front façade with Cape Dutch gables and arched openings with sandstone surrounds. Lean-to corrugated iron verandahs with sandstone pillars on front and side façades. The cornerstone of the building was laid on 25 October 1924 by E R Grobler, administrator of the Orange Free State. Type of site: Town hall. Current use: Town hall. The building, which was erected in 1924-1925, is a typical example of a town hall built in the Free State. It contributes to the character of the area and is a landmark in the town.	Edenburg	Edenburg	Register	29°44′10″S 25°56′08″E	Single storey plastered brick building under pitched corrugated iron roof. Symmetrical front façade with Cape Dutch gables and arched openings with sandstone surrounds. Lean-to corrugated iron verandahs with sandstone pillars on front and side façades. The cornerstone of the building was laid on 25 October 1924 by E R Grobler, administrator of the Orange Free State. Type of site: Town hall. Current use: Town hall. The building, which was erected in 1924-1925, is a typical example of a town hall built in the Free State. It contributes to the character of the area and is a landmark in the town. Media related to Edenburg Town Hall at Wikimedia Commons
9/2/311/0001	Old hostel, Tweespruit High School, Excelsior District	It is a rectangular sandstone building with a courtyard. The interior of the building had changed very much over the years. Type of site: School. Previous use: Stables. Current use: Hostel.	Tweespruit	Excelsior	Provincial Heritage Site	29°11′44″S 27°04′12″E	It is a rectangular sandstone building with a courtyard. The interior of the building had changed very much over the years. Type of site: School. Previous use: Stables. Current use: Hostel.
9/2/311/0002	Old Farmhouse, Merumetsu, Excelsior District	Type of site: Farm.		Excelsior	Register	28°27′22″S 26°47′53″E	Upload Photo
9/2/312/0001	Old Powder Magazine, Luckhoff, Fauresmith District	This powder magazine is built of dolerite stone and has a low corrugated iron roof. This powder magazine, which was erected during the first half of 1899, is a rectangular structure that was built from local dolerite stone. It was presumably erected with a view to the impending Anglo-Boer War (1899–1902). Type of site: Powder magazine. Previous use: Powder magazine.		Fauresmith	Provincial Heritage Site	29°45′09″S 24°47′12″E	Upload Photo
9/2/312/0002	Old Prison, West End Street, Fauresmith	Type of site: Gaol.	Fauresmith	Fauresmith	Provincial Heritage Site	29°44′43″S 25°18′38″E	Upload Photo
9/2/312/0003	Standard Bank, Voortrekker and Van Riebeeck Streets, Fauresmith	This is a single storey building that consists of three entities. Architectural style: Late Republican. Type of site: Bank. Current use: Bank.	Fauresmith	Fauresmith	Provincial Heritage Site	29°44′55″S 25°19′00″E	Upload Photo
9/2/312/0005	Town Hall, Voortrekker Street, Fauresmith	Single storey plastered brick building under pitched corrugated iron roof. Symmetrical front façade with tower, triangular pediment and pilasters. Extensions on side elevations with lean-to corrugated iron verandahs. Timber doors and windows. The building was completed in June 1930 after the previous town hall was destroyed by fire in 1927. It was officially opened by the administrator of the Orange Free State, C T M Willcocks and the mayor of Fauresmith, Dr J J van Niekerk. Type of site: Town hall. Current use: Town hall. The building, which was erected in 1930, is a typical example of a town hall built in the Free State. It contributes to the character of the area and is a landmark in the town.	Fauresmith	Fauresmith	Register	29°44′39″S 25°18′35″E	Upload Photo
9/2/312/0006-001	12 East Burger Street, Fauresmith	0	Fauresmith	Fauresmith	Register	29°44′59″S 25°19′01″E	Upload Photo
9/2/312/0007	Post Office, 25 Voortrekker Street, Fauresmith	Type of site: Post office.	Fauresmith	Fauresmith	Register	29°44′58″S 25°19′10″E	Upload Photo
9/2/313/0008	81 McCabe Street, Ficksburg	The house which was erected in 1885 is probably one of the oldest remaining dwellings in Ficksburg. Many of the original elements of the building, such as the sliding sash windows, quoining around the doors and windows, timber floors, fire-places and fou	Ficksburg	Ficksburg	Register	28°52′12″S 27°52′26″E	Upload Photo
9/2/313/0010	General Fick Museum, Old Market Square, Ficksburg	This building has a red pitched corrugated iron roof and walls of sandstone. It has wood doors. The building was completed in 1893 and is a fine example of the magistrate's offices erected in the Orange Free State during the Late Republican period. Also nearby are the adjacent town hall and old post office.. Type of site: Civic. Previous use: Offices. Current use: Museum.	Ficksburg	Ficksburg	Provincial Heritage Site	28°52′19″S 27°52′30″E	Upload Photo
9/2/313/0011	Town Hall, Old Market Square, Ficksburg	Single storey sandstone building. Double pitched corrugated iron roof with ventilators. Symmetrical front façade with decorative gable. Extensions on side elevations with lean-to corrugated iron verandahs in between. Timber doors and steel windows. The cornerstone of the building was laid on 21 July 1897 by the chairman of the Municipality of Ficksburg, M I Fourie. It was completed before the outbreak of the Anglo-Boer War. Architectural style: Neo-Classical. Type of site: Town hall. Current use: Town hall. This sandstone building with its Neo-Classical features was designed by Walter Donaldson and completed during the 1890s. The town hall, adjacent museum building and old post office, form one of the finest sandstone building groups in the Free State.	Ficksburg	Ficksburg	Provincial Heritage Site	28°52′19″S 27°52′29″E	Upload Photo
9/2/313/0012	Nederduitse Gereformeerde Mother Church, Voortrekker Street, Ficksburg	It is a sandstone building with a corrugated iron roof. It has six louvre ventilators. The building. In 1903 J.D. Kestell was confirmed the new minister. The cornerstone was laid by Ds. J.D. Kestell in. Type of site: Church. Current use: Church.	Ficksburg	Ficksburg	Provincial Heritage Site	28°52′26″S 27°52′41″E	Upload Photo
9/2/313/0013	Old Prison-cells, Brand Street, Ficksburg	It is a single-storey rectangular sandstone building with a flat corrugated iron roof. It has two ti. This building originally formed part of a prison which was erected in 1893. Mr C.R. Swart, first pre. Type of site: Gaol. Previous use: Prison-cells.	Ficksburg	Ficksburg	Provincial Heritage Site	28°52′12″S 27°52′42″E	Upload Photo
9/2/314/0001	Surrender Hill, Amsterdam, Fouriesburg District	0		Fouriesburg	Provincial Heritage Site	28°36′30″S 28°23′00″E	Upload Photo
9/2/314/0006	Nederduitse Gereformeerde Church, Church Square, Fouriesburg	Type of site: Church	Fouriesburg	Fouriesburg	Provincial Heritage Site	28°37′20″S 28°12′24″E	Upload Photo
9/2/314/0007	Town Hall, Martin Street, Fouriesburg	Single-storey sandstone building under hipped corrugated iron roof. Cape Dutch gables on front and side elevations. Timber doors and casement windows, timber floors and pressed steel ceilings. The cornerstone of the building was laid on 8 September 1926 by J H Meiring. The building contractor was Thomas Drummond. Type of site: Town hall. Current use: Town hall. The building, which was erected in 1926, is a fine example of sandstone town hall, built in the Free State. It contributes to the character of the area and is a landmark in the town.	Fouriesburg	Fouriesburg	Register	28°37′14″S 28°12′29″E	Upload Photo
9/2/315/0001	Post Office, Van Reenen Street, Frankfort	Type of site: Post office	Frankfort	Frankfort	Provincial Heritage Site	27°16′39″S 28°29′32″E	Type of site: Post office
9/2/315/0002	Police Station, Van Reenen Street, Frankfort	Type of site: Police station	Frankfort	Frankfort	Provincial Heritage Site	27°16′36″S 28°29′32″E	Upload Photo
9/2/315/0003	Old Magistrate's Court, Van Reenen Street, Frankfort	Type of site: Courthouse.	Frankfort	Frankfort	Provincial Heritage Site	27°16′36″S 28°29′32″E	Upload Photo
9/2/316/0001	Farmhouse, Klerksvlei, Harrismith District	It is an H-form single storey sandstone building with a black painted corrugated iron roof. The building was erected in 1884. It is one of the few farmsteads that was not burnt during the Anglo-Boer War. Type of site: Farm complex. Current use: House.		Harrismith	Provincial Heritage Site	28°17′00″S 29°08′00″E	Upload Photo
9/2/316/0002	British Regimental Badges, Harrismith	0	Harrismith	Harrismith	Provincial Heritage Site		0
9/2/316/0003	36A Boys Street, Harrismith	0	Harrismith	Harrismith	Register	29°07′50″S 28°16′22″E	Upload Photo
9/2/316/0004	Badenhorst Building, Warden Street, Harrismith	0	Harrismith	Harrismith	Register	28°16′32″S 29°07′49″E	Upload Photo
9/2/316/0005	A E Odell Building, Stuart Street, Harrismith	0	Harrismith	Harrismith	Register	28°16′19″S 29°07′46″E	Upload Photo
9/2/316/0011	Swalu Bridge, Landdrost, Harrismith District	It is built out of sandstone. Robert Macfarlane laid the corner stone of the bridge on 04-11-1883. Type of site: Bridge. Current use: Bridge.		Harrismith	Provincial Heritage Site	28°15′54″S 29°02′39″E	Upload Photo
9/2/316/0014	Retiefklip, Kerkenberg, Harrismith District	Thirty km south of Harrismith the road to Bergville descends the Drakensberg escarpment by the steep Oliviershoek Pass. Near the top of the pass a secondary road turns off to the left and, after crossing the Oude bergspruit, ascends a steep rough slope to .		Harrismith	Provincial Heritage Site	28°30′16″S 29°06′53″E	Thirty km south of Harrismith the road to Bergville descends the Drakensberg escarpment by the steep Oliviershoek Pass. Near the top of the pass a secondary road turns off to the left and, after crossing the Oude bergspruit, ascends a steep rough slope to .
9/2/316/0016	Anglo-Boer War Blockhouse, Drakensberg Botanical Garden, Harrismith	This Anglo-Boer War blockhouse is situated on the town commonage of Harrismith, to the north-east of the town. In 1901 the British military authorities built a formidable system of blockhouses in the north-eastern Orange Free State. One of the lines of the Type of site: Blockhouse.	Harrismith	Harrismith	Provincial Heritage Site	28°16′58″S 29°09′39″E	This Anglo-Boer War blockhouse is situated on the town commonage of Harrismith, to the north-east of the town. In 1901 the British military authorities built a formidable system of blockhouses in the north-eastern Orange Free State. One of the lines of the Type of site: Blockhouse.
9/2/316/0020	Nederduitse Gereformeerde Church, Church Street, Warden, Harrismith District	This impressive building with its 44-metre-high (144 ft) clock tower was designed by the architect F. Heesse and erected with the assistance of members of the congregation. The cornerstone of the building was laid on 7 February 1920 and the church was officially Type of site: Church.	Warden	Harrismith	Provincial Heritage Site	27°51′33″S 28°57′44″E	This impressive building with its 44-metre-high (144 ft) clock tower was designed by the architect F. Heesse and erected with the assistance of members of the congregation. The cornerstone of the building was laid on 7 February 1920 and the church was officially Type of site: Church.
9/2/316/0023	Town Hall, Warden Street, Harrismith	Double storey red brick building with centrally placed tower and decorative sandstone detail, including sandstone portico on front façade. Timber doors and windows. Market hall at rear of building with corrugated iron roof and verandah. The building was erected by the builders Kelly and Anderson of Johannesburg. The cornerstone was laid on 2 August 1907 by Sir Hamilton Goold-Adams, lieutenant-governor of the Orange River Colony. The building was officially inaugurated on 7 September 1908. Architectural style: Neo-classical. Type of site: Town hall. Current use: Town hall. This red brick building with its sandstone ornamentation was designed by Price and Agutter and erected in 1907–1908. It is one of the most impressive town halls in the Free State and a landmark in Harrismith.	Harrismith	Harrismith	Provincial Heritage Site	28°16′13″S 29°07′28″E	Double storey red brick building with centrally placed tower and decorative sandstone detail, including sandstone portico on front façade. Timber doors and windows. Market hall at rear of building with corrugated iron roof and verandah. The building was erected by the builders Kelly and Anderson of Johannesburg. The cornerstone was laid on 2 August 1907 by Sir Hamilton Goold-Adams, lieutenant-governor of the Orange River Colony. The building was officially inaugurated on 7 September 1908. Architectural style: Neo-classical. Type of site: Town hall. Current use: Town hall. This red brick building with its sandstone ornamentation was designed by Price and Agutter and erected in 1907–1908. It is one of the most impressive town halls in the Free State and a landmark in Harrismith.
9/2/316/0024	Old Toll-bridge, Wilge River, Swinburne, Harrismith District	It is composed of three arches of thirty-three feet four inches, and carries a roadway of eight feet. This toll-bridge was one of the first for the Free State. Type of site: Toll-bridge. Current use: Bridge.	Harrismith	Harrismith	Provincial Heritage Site	28°21′07″S 29°16′49″E	Upload Photo
9/2/317/0001	Weilbach House, Leeuwpoort, Heilbron District	It is a single storey rectangular sandstone building with a pitched corrugated iron roof. The house was built by a Scot named Sharpe for J.F. Weilbach and his wife. This building and nearby Architectural style: Late Republican. Type of site: House. Current use: House.		Heilbron	Provincial Heritage Site	27°13′30″S 27°56′00″E	Upload Photo
9/2/317/0002	Vegkop Battlefield, Heilbron District	The area is an open terrace with an entrance gate and inside is a monument situated on rocks. On the left of the Lindley road, twenty kilometres south of Heilbron, one sees a long, narrow ridge. This is the famous Vegkop on the farm officially named Vechtkop Oost, where the Voortrekkers were attacked by a strong Matabele force in October, 1836. Type of site: Battlefield. Previous use: Battlefield. Current use: Monument.		Heilbron	Provincial Heritage Site	27°28′41″S 27°54′49″E	Upload Photo
9/2/317/0003	Old farmhouse, Leeuwpoort, Heilbron District	Type of site: Farmhouse. Current use: House.		Heilbron	Provincial Heritage Site	27°13′30″S 27°56′00″E	Upload Photo
9/2/317/0004	Railway station, Heilbron	It is a single storey, rectangular sandstone building with a pitched corrugated iron roof. The building was erected in 1898. Formerly the railway between Bethlehem and Heilbron were finis Architectural style: Republican. Type of site: RailwaysStation. Current use: Railway station.	Heilbron	Heilbron	Provincial Heritage Site	27°17′24″S 27°57′54″E	It is a single storey, rectangular sandstone building with a pitched corrugated iron roof. The building was erected in 1898. Formerly the railway between Bethlehem and Heilbron were finis Architectural style: Republican. Type of site: RailwaysStation. Current use: Railway station.
9/2/318/0001	Farmhouse, Ferreirasrust, Hennenman District	It is a single storey sandstone building with a pitched corrugated iron roof. In the 1890s the house was built for Thomas Minter, owner of the Kaal Valley mine. Architectural style: Late Republican. Type of site: Farm complex. Current use: House.		Hennenman	Provincial Heritage Site	27°58′42″S 27°01′35″E	Upload Photo
9/2/319/0001	Dutch Reformed Church, Church Street, Hoopstad	It is an impressive cruciform church and has neo-gothic features. The church is built of sandstone. The cornerstone of this impressive cruciform church with its Neo-Gothic features was laid by President F. W. Reitz on 6 June 1891. The building was officially inaugurated on 2 December 1892. Architectural style: Neo-Gothic. Type of site: Church. Current use: Church.	Hoopstad	Hoopstad	Provincial Heritage Site	27°50′05″S 25°54′12″E	It is an impressive cruciform church and has neo-gothic features. The church is built of sandstone. The cornerstone of this impressive cruciform church with its Neo-Gothic features was laid by President F. W. Reitz on 6 June 1891. The building was officially inaugurated on 2 December 1892. Architectural style: Neo-Gothic. Type of site: Church. Current use: Church.
9/2/320/0002	Burgher Memorial, Magersfontein, Jacobsdal District	Type of site: Memorial.		Jacobsdal	Provincial Heritage Site	28°59′03″S 24°42′30″E	Upload Photo
9/2/320/0008	Nederduitse Gereformeerde Church, Andries Pretorius Street, Jacobsdal	It is a white cross church with a corrugated iron roof and a tower in the middle of the front gable. The original part of this impressive cruciform church dates from 1879. The corner-stone was laid on 29 January 1878 and the building was completed on 29 July 1879. The original building was changed to its present cross shape by the addition in 1929 and 19 Type of site: Church. Previous use: Church. Current use: Church.	Jacobsdal	Jacobsdal	Provincial Heritage Site	29°07′44″S 24°46′25″E	Upload Photo
9/2/320/0010	Anglo-Boer War Blockhouse, Jacobsdal	The blockhouse was built of dolerite stone and has a low pitched corrugated iron roof. This blockhouse, which dates from 1901, was built of dolerite stone. During the Anglo-Boer War (1899–1902) it formed part of a line of similar blockhouses that was erected to protect the road link between the two railway lines that ran through Kimberley. Type of site: Blockhouse. Previous use: Fortification. Current use: Vacant.	Jacobsdal	Jacobsdal	Provincial Heritage Site	29°07′43″S 24°46′38″E	Upload Photo
9/2/321/0001	Water-pumps, Jagersfontein	It is pumps that that is standing out one metre above the ground. At the top it has the head of a li These 18 water-pumps formed part of the water supply scheme that the firm Stewarts and Lloyds installed for Jager in 1913. The pumps offered a unique solution to the water supply problem that was experienced earlier in many rural towns. Type of site: Water pump. Previous use: Other: Water-pumps. Current use: Other: Water-pumps.	Jagersfontein	Jagersfontein	Provincial Heritage Site	29°45′44″S 25°25′31″E	Upload Photo
9/2/321/0003	Town Hall, Market Square, Jagersfontein	Single storey painted brick building under double pitched corrugated iron roof with ventilators. Timber doors, windows and floors. The building was erected after the previous city hall was destroyed by fire. Type of site: Town hall. Current use: Town hall. The building, which was erected in 1913, forms part of an important group of buildings which face onto the town square. It contributes to the character of the area and is a landmark in the town.	Jagersfontein	Jagersfontein	Register	29°46′00″S 25°26′07″E	Upload Photo
9/2/322/0002	Lutheran Church complex, Adamshoop, Oppermangronde, Koffiefontein District	Type of site: Church Complex.		Koffiefontein	Provincial Heritage Site	29°24′41″S 24°44′38″E	Upload Photo
9/2/323/0002	Vredefort Road Concentration Camp Cemetery, Prospect, Koppies District	Some graves in the cemetery are not readable. In the middle is a monument. This cemetery contains the remains of approximately 800 women and children who died during the Anglo Boer War (1899–1902) in the Vredefort Road Concentration Camp. Type of site: Concentration camp cemetery. Current use: Cemetery.		Koppies	Provincial Heritage Site	27°09′08″S 27°39′12″E	Upload Photo
9/2/324/0001	Farmhouse, Congleton, Kroonstad District	Type of site: Farm complex.	Kroonstad	Kroonstad	Register	27°39′00″S 27°14′00″E	Upload Photo
9/2/324/0003	Kroonstad North Nederduitse Gereformeerde Church, Reitz, Symond and Malherbe Streets, Kroonstad	Type of site: Church.	Kroonstad	Kroonstad	Register	27°39′00″S 27°14′00″E	Type of site: Church.
9/2/324/0005	Old Market Square Post Office and prison-cells, 66 Murray Street, Kroonstad	Type of site: Post office, gaol.	Kroonstad	Kroonstad	Provincial Heritage Site	27°40′11″S 27°14′04″E	Upload Photo
9/2/324/0006	Old market building, Market and Murray Streets, Kroonstad	The building is built in a Victorian style. It has steel gates between the iron pillars. This building with its Victorian features was presumably erected in the late 19th or early 20th century. The steel gates between the iron pillars were added in 1960. The building forms an integral part of the historic market-square of Kroonstad. Architectural style: Victorian. Type of site: Commercial. Current use: Market.	Kroonstad	Kroonstad	Provincial Heritage Site	27°40′10″S 27°14′03″E	Upload Photo
9/2/324/0008	Town Hall, Church Street, Kroonstad	Sandstone building under hipped corrugated iron roof with bell-tower and louvred ventilators. Front façade with two decorative towers, sandstone portico and pediment. Sliding sash windows and timber doors with fanlights. The cornerstone of the building was laid on 14 March 1906 by the mayor of Kroonstad, T W Hoseason. Building operations were started by B W Eastwood and Morris & Lightbody and completed by Rowe & Marshall. Architectural style: Neo-Classical. Type of site: Town hall. Current use: Town hall. The sandstone building with its Neo-Classical features was designed by J H & A E Till. It was officially opened on 7 June 1907 by Sir Hamilton Goold-Adams, lieutenant-governor of the Orange River Colony. It forms part of an important architectural group.	Kroonstad	Kroonstad	Provincial Heritage Site	27°40′05″S 27°14′07″E	Sandstone building under hipped corrugated iron roof with bell-tower and louvred ventilators. Front façade with two decorative towers, sandstone portico and pediment. Sliding sash windows and timber doors with fanlights. The cornerstone of the building was laid on 14 March 1906 by the mayor of Kroonstad, T W Hoseason. Building operations were started by B W Eastwood and Morris & Lightbody and completed by Rowe & Marshall. Architectural style: Neo-Classical. Type of site: Town hall. Current use: Town hall. The sandstone building with its Neo-Classical features was designed by J H & A E Till. It was officially opened on 7 June 1907 by Sir Hamilton Goold-Adams, lieutenant-governor of the Orange River Colony. It forms part of an important architectural group.
9/2/324/0013	Corrugated iron house, Wessels Street, Edenville, Kroonstad District	Type of site: House.	Edenville	Kroonstad	Provisional Protection	27°33′10″S 27°40′22″E	Upload Photo
9/2/324/0014	Old Magistrate's Office, Murray Street, Kroonstad	Type of site: Magistrate's office.	Kroonstad	Kroonstad	Provincial Heritage Site	27°40′09″S 27°14′03″E	Upload Photo
9/2/324/0016	Nederduitse Gereformeerde Mother Church, Church Square, Kroonstad	It is a sandstone building with a corrugated iron roof. On the roof there is a dome. The building was designed by W.H. Ford and completed in 1914. Type of site: Church. Current use: Church.	Kroonstad	Kroonstad	Provincial Heritage Site	27°39′28″S 27°14′43″E	It is a sandstone building with a corrugated iron roof. On the roof there is a dome. The building was designed by W.H. Ford and completed in 1914. Type of site: Church. Current use: Church. Media related to Nederduitse Gereformeerde Mother Church, Kroonstad at Wikimedia Commons
9/2/325/0001	Mill building, Leeuw Rivers Drift, Ladybrand District	Type of site: Commercial.		Ladybrand	Provisional Protection	29°15′30″S 27°12′20″E	Upload Photo
9/2/325/0002	Sandstone school building, Coenraad Snyman Primary School, Modderpoort, Ladybrand District	Type of site: School.		Ladybrand	Register	28°27′15″S 26°47′48″E	Upload Photo
9/2/325/0004	Old Magistrate's Court, Piet Retief Street, Ladybrand	Type of site: Courthouse.	Ladybrand	Ladybrand	Provincial Heritage Site	29°11′51″S 27°27′35″E	Upload Photo
9/2/325/0005	Police Station, Piet Retief Street, Ladybrand	Type of site: Police station.	Ladybrand	Ladybrand	Provincial Heritage Site	29°11′44″S 27°27′23″E	Upload Photo
9/2/325/0007	St James Anglican Church, Joubert Street, Ladybrand	Sandstone building with sandstone buttresses under high-pitched corrugated iron roof. Sandstone apse. The building was erected to serve as a memorial for the late Father James Douglas. Architectural style: Neo-Gothic. Type of site: Church. Current use: Church. This church was designed by John Edwin Harrison.	Ladybrand	Ladybrand	Provincial Heritage Site	29°11′53″S 27°27′18″E	Upload Photo
9/2/325/0016	Town Hall, Dan Pienaar and Joubert Streets, Ladybrand	Single storey sandstone building under corrugated iron roof with louvred ventilators and sandstone chimneys. Sandstone tower and portico in middle of symmetrical front façade. Steel windows and timber doors. Sandstone market building added on at rear. The cornerstone of the building was laid on 11 March 1931 by the mayor of Ladybrand, J N van Soelen. The building contractor was V Daugaard. The market building at the rear was completed in 1933. Type of site: Town hall. Current use: Town hall. The building was designed by the architect F W Masey, and officially opened on 27 January 1932. It is a fine example of a sandstone town hall in the Free State and a landmark in the town.	Ladybrand	Ladybrand	Register	29°11′37″S 27°27′27″E	Upload Photo
9/2/325/0017	Main building and school hall, Ladybrand High School, Collin Street, Ladybrand	The main building is a single storey sandstone building with a modern corrugated iron roof. This school is a landmark in Ladybrand. The corner stone was laid on 1904-03-16 by Hugh Gunn. Architectural style: Edwardian. Type of site: School. Previous use: School. Current use: School.	Ladybrand	Ladybrand	Provincial Heritage Site	29°11′59″S 27°27′04″E	Upload Photo
9/2/325/0021	19 Prinsloo Street, Ladybrand	Rectangular Edwardian gentleman's residence local Ladybrand sandstone. Architectural style: Edwardian. Type of site: House. Current use: Residential.	Ladybrand	Ladybrand	Provincial Heritage Site	27°27′16″S 29°11′45″E	Upload Photo
9/2/326/0003	Beehive Stone Huts Sedan Lindley District	A group of pre-historic stone huts at Lindley in the Province of the Orange Free State. The figure D.A.B.C. represents 3.0815 morgen of ground, being servitude No 1 on subdivision 1 of the farm Sedan No 133, Situated in the District of Lindley, Province of the Orange Free State, as indicated on Diagram SG No 37/1950 dated 14 February 1950.		Lindley	Provincial Heritage Site	27°53′49″S 27°47′25″E	Upload Photo
9/2/326/0004	Old Nederduitse Gereformeerde Church Parsonage, 33 Du Plessis Street, Petrus Steyn, Lindley District	It is a single storey sandstone building with a red painted corrugated iron roof. The congregation was established in 1914. Type of site: Parsonage. Current use: House.	Petrus Steyn	Lindley	Provincial Heritage Site	27°39′02″S 28°08′01″E	Upload Photo
9/2/326/0005	Town Hall, Church Street, Lindley	Single storey sandstone building under hipped corrugated iron roof with louvred ventilators. Triangular sandstone gables. Arched entrances to enclosed sandstone stoep on two sides of the building. The original part of the building was officially opened on 7 December 1911 by the mayor of Lindley, S A Lange. The builder was P G J Koornhof. The new addition, built by E Hern, was opened on 7 September 1937 by the administrator of the Orange Free State. Type of site: Town hall. Current use: Town hall. The original portion of the building was erected in 1911, and the later addition in 1937 was designed by the well-known architect H G E de la Cornillere. The building is a fine example of a sandstone town hall and a landmark in the town.	Lindley	Lindley	Register	27°54′03″S 27°54′47″E	Upload Photo
9/2/326/0013	Town Hall, cnr Steyn and Van Riebeeck Streets, Steynsrus, Lindley District	Single storey plastered brick building under hipped corrugated iron roof. Gables on front and rear elevations. Projecting bay on front façade with triangular pediment and pilasters. Brick plinth. Steel doors and windows. Type of site: Town hall. Current use: Town hall. The building, which was erected in 1929, is a fine example of a town hall, built in the Free State and a landmark in the town.	Steynsrus	Lindley	Register	27°57′10″S 27°33′49″E	Upload Photo
9/2/328/0001	Prospecting bore-hole, Aandenk, Odendaalsrus District	This borehole on the farm Aandenk is 400 feet deep and in extent 4,301 square feet. One of the national roads from Bloemfontein passes through Brandfort and Theunissen to Welkom, Odendaalsrus and Allanridge in the Orange Free State Gold-fields. Where the road swings suddenly to the right near a large mine dump just south of Allanridge. Type of site: Mine. Previous use: Mining. Current use: Mining.		Odendaalsrus	Provincial Heritage Site	27°46′00″S 26°38′38″E	This borehole on the farm Aandenk is 400 feet deep and in extent 4,301 square feet. One of the national roads from Bloemfontein passes through Brandfort and Theunissen to Welkom, Odendaalsrus and Allanridge in the Orange Free State Gold-fields. Where the road swings suddenly to the right near a large mine dump just south of Allanridge. Type of site: Mine. Previous use: Mining. Current use: Mining.
9/2/329/0004	Old magistrate's office, Liebenbergtrek Street, Parys	Single storey red brick building with a red pitched iron roof. Upon the roof are two chimneys. The building was erected during 1899–1900 when the Free State was under British control. In 1907, the Architectural style: Edwardian. Type of site: Magistrate's office. Previous use: Magistrate's court. Current use: Museum.	Parys	Parys	Provincial Heritage Site	26°54′01″S 27°27′25″E	Single storey red brick building with a red pitched iron roof. Upon the roof are two chimneys. The building was erected during 1899–1900 when the Free State was under British control. In 1907, the Architectural style: Edwardian. Type of site: Magistrate's office. Previous use: Magistrate's court. Current use: Museum.
9/2/329/0007	Nederduitse Gereformeerde Mother Church, Hefer Street, Parys	The cruciform church has Neo-Gothic features. It has a tower in the middle of the front gable. The corner-stone was laid by the Moderator of the Orange Free State Synod, the Rev. I. J. T. Marquard, on 14 January 1899. The building was completed shortly after the outbreak of the Anglo-Boer War. Architectural style: Neo-Gothic. Type of site: Church. Current use: Church.	Parys	Parys	Provincial Heritage Site	26°54′03″S 27°27′21″E	The cruciform church has Neo-Gothic features. It has a tower in the middle of the front gable. The corner-stone was laid by the Moderator of the Orange Free State Synod, the Rev. I. J. T. Marquard, on 14 January 1899. The building was completed shortly after the outbreak of the Anglo-Boer War. Architectural style: Neo-Gothic. Type of site: Church. Current use: Church. Media related to Nederduitse Gereformeerde Mother Church, Parys at Wikimedia Commons
9/2/330/0003	Lutheran Church, Katdoornput, Petrusburg District	Type of site: Church. This simple church building with its Gothic features was designed and erected in 1897 by missionaries of the Berlin Mission Society at Bethany. It is one of only a few mission churches which remain in the Free State.		Petrusburg	Provisional Protection	29°00′54″S 25°29′17″E	Upload Photo
9/2/331/0001	7 Colin Fraser Street, Philippolis	Architectural style: Victorian. Type of site: House. Current use: House. The wagon-house forms an instrinsic part of the property, already declared a national monument. The property was the family home of Christiaan van der Post, who played an important role in the political history of the Free State.	Philippolis	Philippolis	Provincial Heritage Site	30°15′51″S 25°16′30″E	Architectural style: Victorian. Type of site: House. Current use: House. The wagon-house forms an instrinsic part of the property, already declared a national monument. The property was the family home of Christiaan van der Post, who played an important role in the political history of the Free State.
9/2/331/0002	Powder magazine, Philippolis	Type of site: Powder magazine. Current use: Unused.	Philippolis	Philippolis	Provincial Heritage Site	30°15′52″S 25°16′26″E	Upload Photo
9/2/331/0003	4 Justisie Street, Philippolis	Single storeyed Karoo-house with flat corrugated iron roof behind front parapet wall. Architectural style: Karoo. Type of site: House. Current use: House. Fairly unchanged example of a typical Karoo-house.	Philippolis	Philippolis	Provincial Heritage Site	30°15′44″S 25°16′18″E	Single storeyed Karoo-house with flat corrugated iron roof behind front parapet wall. Architectural style: Karoo. Type of site: House. Current use: House. Fairly unchanged example of a typical Karoo-house.
9/2/331/0004	Old Pound, Justisie Street, Philippolis	Two adjacent stone-walled rectilinear kraals with cement pointing. Architectural style: Vernacular. Type of site: Pound. Previous use: Other: pound. Current use: Vacant. One of only two known remaining pounds in the Orange Free State.	Philippolis	Philippolis	Provincial Heritage Site	30°15′40″S 25°16′16″E	Two adjacent stone-walled rectilinear kraals with cement pointing. Architectural style: Vernacular. Type of site: Pound. Previous use: Other: pound. Current use: Vacant. One of only two known remaining pounds in the Orange Free State.
9/2/331/0007-035	27 Tobie Muller Street, Philippolis	Modern single storeyed plastered brick house under pitched corrugated iron roof. Architectural style: Modern. Type of site: House. Current use: House. Detracts from character of traditional street scape.	Philippolis	Philippolis	Provincial Heritage Site	30°16′00″S 25°16′24″E	Upload Photo
9/2/331/0007-074	16 Tobie Muller Street, Philippolis	Single storeyed plastered brick Karoo house. Flat corrugated iron roof behind front parapet. This dwelling-house is a fine example of the flat-roofed type which from the late fifties of the nineteenth century replaced the houses with steep thatched roofs in the Orange Free State. Architectural style: Victorian. Type of site: House. Previous use: House. Current use: Vacant.	Philippolis	Philippolis	Provincial Heritage Site	30°15′56″S 25°16′24″E	Upload Photo
9/2/331/0009	24 Tobie Muller Street, Philippolis	Single storeyed rough-cast plastered brick Karoo house. Flat corrugated iron roof behind front parap This dwelling-house is a fine example of the flat-roofed type which from the late fifties of the nineteenth century replaced the houses with steep thatched roofs in the Orange Free State. Architectural style: Karoo-style. Type of site: House. Current use: House. Important example of Karoo architecture with fine details. Forms part of traditional Tobie Muller St.	Philippolis	Philippolis	Provincial Heritage Site	30°16′00″S 25°16′24″E	Single storeyed rough-cast plastered brick Karoo house. Flat corrugated iron roof behind front parap This dwelling-house is a fine example of the flat-roofed type which from the late fifties of the nineteenth century replaced the houses with steep thatched roofs in the Orange Free State. Architectural style: Karoo-style. Type of site: House. Current use: House. Important example of Karoo architecture with fine details. Forms part of traditional Tobie Muller St.
9/2/331/0010	26 Kok Street, Philippolis	This property appears to consist of two houses of two different styles. One is an example of a flat This dwelling-house is a fine example of the flat-roofed type which from the late fifties of the nineteenth century replaced the houses with steep thatched roofs in the Orange Free State. Architectural style: Karoo Victorian. Type of site: House. Current use: House.	Philippolis	Philippolis	Provincial Heritage Site	30°15′58″S 25°16′26″E	Upload Photo
9/2/331/0012	Nederduitse Gereformeerde Church, Voortrekker Street, Philippolis	The picturesque town of Philippolis lies among typical stony hills some 28 kilometres north of the Orange River. It has a long history, for it was here that the Griquas under Adam Kok settled in 1825 at the insistence of Dr. John Philip. Type of site: Church. Previous use: Church. Current use: Church. On this ground stood originally the Griqua missionary church. On 08-05-1869, the corner-stone of this church was laid. This church was inaugurated in 1869 and is a fine example of nineteenth-century ecclesiastical architecture in South Africa.	Philippolis	Philippolis	Provincial Heritage Site	30°15′42″S 25°16′22″E	The picturesque town of Philippolis lies among typical stony hills some 28 kilometres north of the Orange River. It has a long history, for it was here that the Griquas under Adam Kok settled in 1825 at the insistence of Dr. John Philip. Type of site: Church. Previous use: Church. Current use: Church. On this ground stood originally the Griqua missionary church. On 08-05-1869, the corner-stone of this church was laid. This church was inaugurated in 1869 and is a fine example of nineteenth-century ecclesiastical architecture in South Africa. Media related to Nederduitse Gereformeerde Church, Philippolis at Wikimedia Commons
9/2/331/0013	Jacobson Museum and Library, 34 Voortrekker Street, Philippolis	Single storey plastered brick building with a high pitched corrugated iron roof and This imposing building, with its predominantly Victorian features, dates from 1905/6. Moritz Jacobson, bought the property in 1921 and lived there until 1977, when he donated it to the Municipality of Philippolis to be used as a library. Architectural style: Victorian. Type of site: Library, museum. Previous use: House. Current use: Library and museum.	Philippolis	Philippolis	Provincial Heritage Site	30°15′45″S 25°16′23″E	Single storey plastered brick building with a high pitched corrugated iron roof and This imposing building, with its predominantly Victorian features, dates from 1905/6. Moritz Jacobson, bought the property in 1921 and lived there until 1977, when he donated it to the Municipality of Philippolis to be used as a library. Architectural style: Victorian. Type of site: Library, museum. Previous use: House. Current use: Library and museum.
9/2/332/0001	21 Boshoff Street, Reddersburg	Type of site: House.	Reddersburg	Reddersburg	Register	29°39′13″S 26°10′23″E	Upload Photo
9/2/332/0002	Old nursing home, 11 Oranje Street, Reddersburg	0	Reddersburg	Reddersburg	Register	29°39′08″S 26°10′33″E	Upload Photo
9/2/332/0003	Old CNO School, 7 Stewie Joubert Street, Reddersburg	This T-shaped building has a pitched corrugated iron roof with side gables. It has a veranda in front This building was erected to house the C.N.O.-school, which was opened in 1904 in Reddersburg. ype of site: School. Previous use: School. Current use: House. This building was erected to house the C. N. O.-school, which was opened in 1904 in Reddersburg. It therefore occupies an important place in the history of education in the town.	Reddersburg	Reddersburg	Provincial Heritage Site	29°39′11″S 26°10′31″E	This T-shaped building has a pitched corrugated iron roof with side gables. It has a veranda in front This building was erected to house the C.N.O.-school, which was opened in 1904 in Reddersburg. ype of site: School. Previous use: School. Current use: House. This building was erected to house the C. N. O.-school, which was opened in 1904 in Reddersburg. It therefore occupies an important place in the history of education in the town.
9/2/332/0004	Old Reformed Church, Boshoff Street, Reddersburg	The church is built in an oblong shape. It has a big consistory in the north. It has gables on both sides. The Reformed Church at Reddersburg was erected in 1862 and is the mother church of the Reformed Church in the Orange Free State. Type of site: Church. Previous use: Church. Current use: Church.	Reddersburg	Reddersburg	Provincial Heritage Site	29°39′11″S 26°10′19″E	Upload Photo
9/2/333/0002	Nederduitse Gereformeerde Church, Church Street, Reitz	On 1912-08-10 Pres. M.T. Steyn laid the corner-stone of the Dutch Reformed church in Reitz. Type of site: Church. Current use: Church. One of the few conservation-worthy buildings in Reitz	Reitz	Reitz	Provincial Heritage Site	27°48′17″S 28°25′48″E	Upload Photo
9/2/333/0004	Town Hall, Voortrekker Street, Reitz	Single storey brick building under hipped corrugated iron roof. Symmetrical front façade with pilasters, large triangular pediment and gable. Brick extensions on side levations with corrugated iron roofs. Timber doors and steel windows. The cornerstone of the building was laid on 12 February 1937 by the mayor of Reitz, Councillor C H Walker. The building was officially opened on 14 December 1937 by the administrator of the Orange Free State, Dr J F van Rensburg. Type of site: Town hall. Current use: Town hall. The building, which was erected in 1937, was designed by the architect H G E de la Cornillere. It is a typical example of a town hall built in the Free State and forms part of the history of Reitz.	Reitz	Reitz	Register (Withdrawn)	27°47′57″S 28°25′49″E	Upload Photo
9/2/334/0001	Dutch Reformed Church, Church Street, Rouxville	This an impressive building with its neo-gothic features, was built of sandstone. This impressive sandstone building with its neo-Gothic features was designed by the architect Richard Wocke. The corner-stone was laid on 11 July 1879 and the building was officially inaugurated on 11 March 1881. Architectural style: Neo-Gothic. Type of site: Church. Previous use: Church. Current use: Church.	Rouxville	Rouxville	Provincial Heritage Site	30°25′01″S 26°50′06″E	Upload Photo
9/2/334/0002-001	Old turbine building, Goedemoed, Rouxville District	0		Rouxville	Register	28°27′15″S 26°47′48″E	Upload Photo
9/2/334/0002-002	Old school building, Goedemoed, Rouxville District	Type of site: School.		Rouxville	Register	28°27′15″S 26°47′48″E	Upload Photo
9/2/334/0002-003	Old church building, Goedemoed, Rouxville District	0		Rouxville	Register	28°27′15″S 26°47′48″E	Upload Photo
9/2/334/0004	Town Hall, Piet Retief Street, Rouxville	Single storeyed painted brick building under hipped corrugated iron roof with tower on roof ridge. Corrugated iron verandahs with iron columns. Three arched entrances in front façade. Timber doors and casement windows. Painted sandstone foundation. The building was erected in 1911 by the brothers Morton of Aliwal North. It was used as a cinema and for religious and political meetings. In 1961 the building was extensively modernised for the centenary celebrations of the town. Type of site: Town hall. Current use: Town hall. The building was designed by the architect H G E de la Cornillere, and was officially opened on 11 July 1911 by the administrator of the Orange Free State, A E W Ramsbottom. It occupies an important place in the history of Rouxville.	Rouxville	Rouxville	Provisional Protection	30°25′04″S 26°50′04″E	Upload Photo
9/2/334/0005-001	Tuishuisie, Roux Street, Rouxville	It is a single storey building with white painted walls and a pitched iron roof. It is suspected that the building were built for P.J.C. Swanepoel as a 'tuishuisie' for his family. Architectural style: Republican. Type of site: House. Current use: House.	Rouxville	Rouxville	Provincial Heritage Site	30°24′56″S 26°50′04″E	Upload Photo
9/2/335/0002	Farm school, Taaiboschspruit, Sasolburg District	Type of site: School. This sandstone school building which was erected in 1916 has remained fairly unaltered over the years. It is a fine example of the farm schools which played a significant educational role in the Free State during the first half of this century.		Sasolburg	Register	26°53′30″S 27°53′40″E	Upload Photo
9/2/335/0003	Muller House, Wonderfontein, Sasolburg District	Type of site: House.		Sasolburg	Provisional Protection	26°48′59″S 27°54′58″E	Upload Photo
9/2/336/0001	Dutch Reformed Mother Church, Church Square, Senekal	The church square is enclosed by a wall on which fossil tree trunks were placed in the forties. The corner-stone of the church was laid in 1895-06-06. This historic church building was designed by the architects J. H. and A. E. Till and built in sandstone by the contractors Rowe, Marshall and Hill. The building was consecrated in 1896. Type of site: Church. Current use: Church.	Senekal	Senekal	Provincial Heritage Site	28°19′22″S 27°37′20″E	The church square is enclosed by a wall on which fossil tree trunks were placed in the forties. The corner-stone of the church was laid in 1895-06-06. This historic church building was designed by the architects J. H. and A. E. Till and built in sandstone by the contractors Rowe, Marshall and Hill. The building was consecrated in 1896. Type of site: Church. Current use: Church.
9/2/336/0002	Anglican Church, Berg Street, Senekal	Small sandstone building with corrugated iron roof. West façade ends in triangular gable. The erf of the building was donated to the Anglican Church by Frederik M. Malan in 1880. Type of site: Church. Current use: Church. The sandstone building was erected in the early 1880s.	Senekal	Senekal	Provisional Protection	28°19′15″S 27°37′26″E	Upload Photo
9/2/337/0001	Mill building, Carmel, Smithfield District	Type of site: Commercial. The mill-building, together with the nearby tomb where Lemue and his wife are buried, are the only tangible remainder of the former mission station at Carmel. It serves at a reminder of the valuable contribution made by earlier missionaries.	Smithfield	Smithfield	Register	30°12′45″S 26°31′53″E	Upload Photo
9/2/337/0002	Farmhouse, Beersheba, Smithfield District	Type of site: Farm complex.		Smithfield	Provincial Heritage Site	30°07′10″S 26°44′20″E	Upload Photo
9/2/337/0003	Cemetery, Carmel, Smithfield District	Type of site: Cemetery.		Smithfield	Provincial Heritage Site	30°20′40″S 26°17′11″E	Upload Photo
9/2/337/0005	Police Station, Juana Square, Smithfield	Type of site: Police station.	Smithfield	Smithfield	Register	30°12′45″S 26°31′53″E	Type of site: Police station.
9/2/337/0007	Erf 50, Church Street, Smithfield	It is a rectangular single storey building with plaster on the walls and painted white. The building was erected in the late fifties of the nineteenth century. Architectural style: Republican. Type of site: House. Current use: House.	Smithfield	Smithfield	Provincial Heritage Site	30°12′54″S 26°32′10″E	Upload Photo
9/2/337/0012	Town Hall, Brand Street, Smithfield	Single storey plastered brick building under hipped corrugated iron roof. Symmetrical front façade with stepped gables and portico, built partially of sandstone. Verandahs on front and side elevations. Timber doors and steel and casement windows. The building was officially opened on 19 August 1925 by the administrator of the Orange Free State, E R Grobler. Type of site: Town hall. Current use: Town hall. The building, which was designed by the architect H G E de la Cornillere, was erected in 1925. It is a fine example of a town hall built in the Free State and a landmark in the town.	Smithfield	Smithfield	Register	30°13′03″S 26°31′45″E	Single storey plastered brick building under hipped corrugated iron roof. Symmetrical front façade with stepped gables and portico, built partially of sandstone. Verandahs on front and side elevations. Timber doors and steel and casement windows. The building was officially opened on 19 August 1925 by the administrator of the Orange Free State, E R Grobler. Type of site: Town hall. Current use: Town hall. The building, which was designed by the architect H G E de la Cornillere, was erected in 1925. It is a fine example of a town hall built in the Free State and a landmark in the town.
9/2/337/0013	Birthplace of C R de Wet, Kleinfontein 762, Smithfield District	About 24 kilometres north-west of Smithfield along the 214 main road to Edenburg, a road turns off to the right. Some kilometres along this road is a large round hill known as Leeuwkop, standing up prominently above the horizon. This hill has given. These ruins are all that remain of the two-roomed clay cottage where Gen. C. R. de Wet was born on 7 October 1854. He lived here with his parents until the age of five.		Smithfield	Provincial Heritage Site	29°58′25″S 26°29′40″E	Upload Photo
9/2/338/0002	Old Nederduitse Gereformeerde Church parsonage, 43 Sarel Cilliers Street, Theunissen	Type of site: Parsonage.	Theunissen	Theunissen	Register	28°24′10″S 26°42′29″E	Upload Photo
9/2/338/0004	Town Hall, Le Roux Street, Theunissen	Single storey plastered brick building under hipped corrugated iron roof with ventilators on roof ridge. Front elevation provided with stepped gables and a tower on each corner. Steel windows. Brick plinth. The cornerstone of the building was laid on 10 March 1936 by the mayor of Theunissen, J H van Heeren. The building contractor was D Watson and Son. The building was inaugurated on 21 October 1936. Type of site: Town hall. Current use: Town hall. The building, which was erected in 1936, was designed by H A C Wallace. It forms part of the history of Theunissen and is a landmark in the town.	Theunissen	Theunissen	Register	28°24′01″S 26°42′45″E	Upload Photo
9/2/339/0003	Town Hall, Voortrekker Street, Trompsburg	Single storey plastered brick building under hipped corrugated iron roof. Front elevation provided with sandstone gable and double timber door with arched fanlight. Steel windows. The cornerstone of the building was laid on 27 August 1926 by B Tromp (sen.). Type of site: Town hall. Current use: Town hall. The building, which was erected in 1926/1927, forms part of the history of Trompsburg.	Trompsburg	Trompsburg	Register	30°01′53″S 25°46′55″E	Single storey plastered brick building under hipped corrugated iron roof. Front elevation provided with sandstone gable and double timber door with arched fanlight. Steel windows. The cornerstone of the building was laid on 27 August 1926 by B Tromp (sen.). Type of site: Town hall. Current use: Town hall. The building, which was erected in 1926/1927, forms part of the history of Trompsburg.
9/2/340/0001	Nederduitse Gereformeerde Church, Steyn Street, Ventersburg	On 1912-10-13 the corner-stone was laid by Pres. M.T. Steyn. The building was inaugurated on 1913-07. Type of site: Church. Current use: Church.	Ventersburg	Ventersburg	Provincial Heritage Site	28°05′03″S 27°08′12″E	On 1912-10-13 the corner-stone was laid by Pres. M.T. Steyn. The building was inaugurated on 1913-07. Type of site: Church. Current use: Church. Media related to Nederduitse Gereformeerde Church, Ventersburg at Wikimedia Commons
9/2/340/0002	Early Sotho settlement, Waterval, Sandrivierhoogte, Ventersburg District	The corbelled huts was built of rocks. This village, which dates from the seventeenth century with its characteristic corbelled huts and stone kraals, is an excellent example of the architecture and way of life of the Leghoya in the Free State. Type of site: House. Previous use: Argeological site.		Ventersburg	Provincial Heritage Site	28°14′40″S 27°04′47″E	Upload Photo
9/2/340/0003	Town Hall, Voortrekker Street, Ventersburg	Single storey plastered brick building under hipped corrugated iron roof with ventilators on roof ridge. Gables and lean-to verandah with pre-cast columns on front façade. Double timber main door with side lights and fan lights and steel windows. The cornerstone of the building was laid on 27 June 1928 by E R Grobler, administrator of the Free State. The building contractor was H B Kruger. The building was officially inaugurated on 8 December 1928. Type of site: Town hall. Current use: Town hall. The building, which was erected in 1928, forms part of the history of Ventersburg.	Ventersburg	Ventersburg	Register	28°05′10″S 27°08′13″E	Single storey plastered brick building under hipped corrugated iron roof with ventilators on roof ridge. Gables and lean-to verandah with pre-cast columns on front façade. Double timber main door with side lights and fan lights and steel windows. The cornerstone of the building was laid on 27 June 1928 by E R Grobler, administrator of the Free State. The building contractor was H B Kruger. The building was officially inaugurated on 8 December 1928. Type of site: Town hall. Current use: Town hall. The building, which was erected in 1928, forms part of the history of Ventersburg. Media related to Ventersburg Town Hall at Wikimedia Commons
9/2/340/0004	Skanskraal and Voortrekker Graves, Kromfontein, Ventersburg District	Type of site: Graves Voortrekker.		Ventersburg	Provincial Heritage Site	28°05′06″S 27°07′45″E	Upload Photo
9/2/340/0005	Old Police station complex, Ventersburg	Police office building: two room, iron building with timber sash windows, and timber floors. The building complex consists of a police station, prison, horse-stables, pound and rondavel. Architectural style: Late Republican. Type of site: Police station. Previous use: Police station. Current use: Police museum.	Ventersburg	Ventersburg	Provincial Heritage Site	28°05′16″S 27°08′10″E	Police office building: two room, iron building with timber sash windows, and timber floors. The building complex consists of a police station, prison, horse-stables, pound and rondavel. Architectural style: Late Republican. Type of site: Police station. Previous use: Police station. Current use: Police museum. Media related to SAPS Museum, Ventersburg at Wikimedia Commons
9/2/341/0002	Farmhouse and cooler, Thornvale, Viljoenskroon District	Type of site: Farm complex.		Viljoenskroon	Provincial Heritage Site	27°27′00″S 26°56′30″E	Upload Photo
9/2/343/0001-001	All Saints Anglican Church, 70 Church Street, Vrede	Small dolomite building with corrugated iron roof. Entrance porch provided with double timber door. The building was erected in 1890 by the building contractors Thomas Cowan and Aleck H. Doig. Architectural style: Neo-gothic. Type of site: Church. Current use: Church. The building, with its neo-Gothic features, was erected in 1890.	Vrede	Vrede	Provincial Heritage Site	29°08′55″S 27°26′12″E	Upload Photo
9/2/343/0003	Nederduitse Gereformeerde Church, Church Square, Vrede	It is a single-storey sandstone building with a corrugated iron roof. The building has two side wings. The congregation of Vrede was established on 1882-03-04. The cornerstone was laid on 1887-10-31 by P Architectural style: Neo-gothic. Type of site: Church. Current use: Church.	Vrede	Vrede	Provincial Heritage Site	27°25′35″S 29°09′51″E	It is a single-storey sandstone building with a corrugated iron roof. The building has two side wings. The congregation of Vrede was established on 1882-03-04. The cornerstone was laid on 1887-10-31 by P Architectural style: Neo-gothic. Type of site: Church. Current use: Church.
9/2/344/0002	Post Office, 15 Oranje Street, Vredefort	Type of site: Post office.	Vredefort	Vredefort	Provincial Heritage Site	27°00′23″S 27°22′04″E	Type of site: Post office. Media related to Vredefort Post Office at Wikimedia Commons
9/2/344/0003	Nederduitse Gereformeerde Church, Church Street, Vredefort	Type of site: Church.	Vredefort	Vredefort	Register	27°00′03″S 27°22′24″E	Type of site: Church. Media related to Nederduitse Gereformeerde Church, Vredefort at Wikimedia Commons
9/2/344/0004	Nederduitse Gereformeerde Church Hall, Church Street, Vredefort	Type of site: Church hall.	Vredefort	Vredefort	Register	27°00′19″S 27°22′03″E	Type of site: Church hall. Media related to Nederduitse Gereformeerde Church Hall, Vredefort at Wikimedia Commons
9/2/344/0005	30 Charl Cilliers Street, Vredefort	Type of site: House.	Vredefort	Vredefort	Register	27°00′16″S 27°22′07″E	Type of site: House. Media related to 30 Charl Cilliers Street, Vredefort at Wikimedia Commons
9/2/345/0001	MOTH Club House, 24 12th Street, Voorspoed East, Welkom	Type of site: Moth Club.	Welkom, Voorspoed	Welkom	Register	27°59′03″S 26°46′36″E	Upload Photo
9/2/346/0001	First dwelling-house of President J P Hoffman and the family cemetery, Hoffmansrust, Wepener District	Type of site: Cemetery.		Wepener	Register	28°27′15″S 26°47′48″E	Upload Photo
9/2/346/0007	Robertson Church and Cemetery, Jammersberg Drift, Wepener District	Each grave is clearly marked with the name and regiment of the fallen soldier. The Jammersdrif battle took place here. The cemetery is the last resting place of the Robertson family. Architectural style: Neo Gothic. Type of site: Church, cemetery. Current use: Church, cemetery.		Wepener	Provincial Heritage Site	29°42′46″S 26°58′49″E	Upload Photo
9/2/346/0007-001	Jammerberg Drift Battlefield, Anniesdale, Wepener District	Type of site: Battlefield. At this battlefield in April 1900, Col. E. H. Dalgety and his Colonial Division of about 2,000 men were besieged for 16 days by Gen. Christiaan de Wet and his superior force of almost 6,000 men.		Wepener	Provincial Heritage Site	29°43′00″S 26°59′00″E	Upload Photo
9/2/346/0008	Old wagon-bridge, Caledon River, Jammerbergs Brug, Wepener District	It is a steel arch bridge with sandstone foot pieces. In the rainy season Caledon was cut off from the rest of the Free State and therefore a bridge was built. Type of site: Bridge. Current use: Bridge.		Wepener	Provincial Heritage Site	29°42′46″S 26°59′10″E	Upload Photo
9/2/346/0009	Town Hall, De Beer Street, Wepener	Single storey plastered brick building under hipped corrugated iron roof with ventilator on roof ridge. Front façade provided with tower and projecting bay with pediment and pilasters. Double timber doors and casement windows. Red painted brick plinth. The building was officially opened on 31 May 1928 by the mayor of Wepener, Councillor D du Plessis. The building contractor was D J H Spies. In 1963 the building was repaired and modernised. Type of site: Town hall. Current use: Town hall. The building, which was designed by the architect H G E de la Cornillere, was erected in 1927. It is a fine example of a town hall, built in the Free State. It forms part of the history of Wepener and is a landmark in the town.	Wepener	Wepener	Register	29°43′43″S 27°02′20″E	Upload Photo
9/2/348/0001	Dutch Reformed Church, Church Square, Winburg	The church is built of sandstone in a neo-gothic style. It has a big tower. This imposing neo-Gothic sandstone church was designed by the architects J. H. and A. E. Till and erected by the builders Rundle, Rowe and Marshall. The comer-stone was laid on 20 January 1899 by M. T. Steyn, president of the Orange Free State. Architectural style: Neo-Gothic. Type of site: Church. Previous use: Hospital. Current use: Church.	Winburg	Winburg	Provincial Heritage Site	28°31′07″S 27°00′42″E	The church is built of sandstone in a neo-gothic style. It has a big tower. This imposing neo-Gothic sandstone church was designed by the architects J. H. and A. E. Till and erected by the builders Rundle, Rowe and Marshall. The comer-stone was laid on 20 January 1899 by M. T. Steyn, president of the Orange Free State. Architectural style: Neo-Gothic. Type of site: Church. Previous use: Hospital. Current use: Church.
9/2/348/0004	Military Cemetery, Winburg	The terrain has a fence. The graves have silver painted iron crosses on a cement pedestal. The cemetery contains the mortal remains of women and children who died during the Anglo-Boer War. Type of site: Military cemetery. Current use: Graveyard.	Winburg	Winburg	Provincial Heritage Site	28°31′10″S 27°00′25″E	The terrain has a fence. The graves have silver painted iron crosses on a cement pedestal. The cemetery contains the mortal remains of women and children who died during the Anglo-Boer War. Type of site: Military cemetery. Current use: Graveyard.
9/2/348/0011	Town Hall, Andries Pretorius Square, Winburg	Single storey red brick building under hipped corrugated iron roof. Stoep with pre-cast columns in front of main entrance. Brick extensions with corrugated iron roofs on side elevations. Timber doors and steel windows. The cornerstone of the building was laid on 23 March 1938 by Dr J F J van Rensburg, administrator of the Orange Free State. Type of site: Town hall. Current use: Town hall. The building, which was erected in 1938, forms part of the history of Winburg and is a landmark in the town.	Winburg	Winburg	Register	28°32′00″S 27°01′00″E	Single storey red brick building under hipped corrugated iron roof. Stoep with pre-cast columns in front of main entrance. Brick extensions with corrugated iron roofs on side elevations. Timber doors and steel windows. The cornerstone of the building was laid on 23 March 1938 by Dr J F J van Rensburg, administrator of the Orange Free State. Type of site: Town hall. Current use: Town hall. The building, which was erected in 1938, forms part of the history of Winburg and is a landmark in the town.
9/2/350/0001-001	House of Jan de Winnaar, Higgs Street, Zastron	Type of site: House. This Voortrekker cottage dates from the early nineteenth century. It was erected by one of the first European settlers in the South-eastern Free State, Jan Hendrik de Winnaar.	Zastron	Zastron	Deproclaimed	30°18′00″S 27°05′00″E	Upload Photo
9/2/501/0002	Archbell House, St Paul's Mission, Thaba 'Nchu	The house is built of coursed cut stone and has a metal tile roof. After the Barolong tribe had moved from Platberg to Thaba Nchu in 1833, the church and the Rev. Archbell's mission house were re-erected here. Between 1836 and 1839, this house of the Rev. Archbell was probably enlarged. Type of site: House. Previous use: House.		Thaba Nchu	Provincial Heritage Site	29°13′03″S 26°50′57″E	Upload Photo
	The Burgher monument, Boomplaats, Edenburg District	Structures on property: A monument of blue dolerite (iron stone), erected in 1938, toilets of brick, a few reed-and-grass structures a corrugated iron shed and a donkey-boiler of stone. Boomplaats is the site of the historical battle on 29 August 1848 between the British forces under the command of the Governor of the Cape, Sir Harry Smith, and a Boer Commando led by Gen. Andries Pretorius. The monument was erected on 16 December 1938 approximately 100km South West of Bloemfontein.	Edenburg	Edenburg	Provincial Heritage Site		Upload Photo
