= Wepener (surname) =

Wepener is a surname. Notable people with the surname include:

- Louw Wepener (1812–1865), South African commandant
- Willie Wepener (born 1981), South African rugby union player
