= Queen's Fort Military Museum =

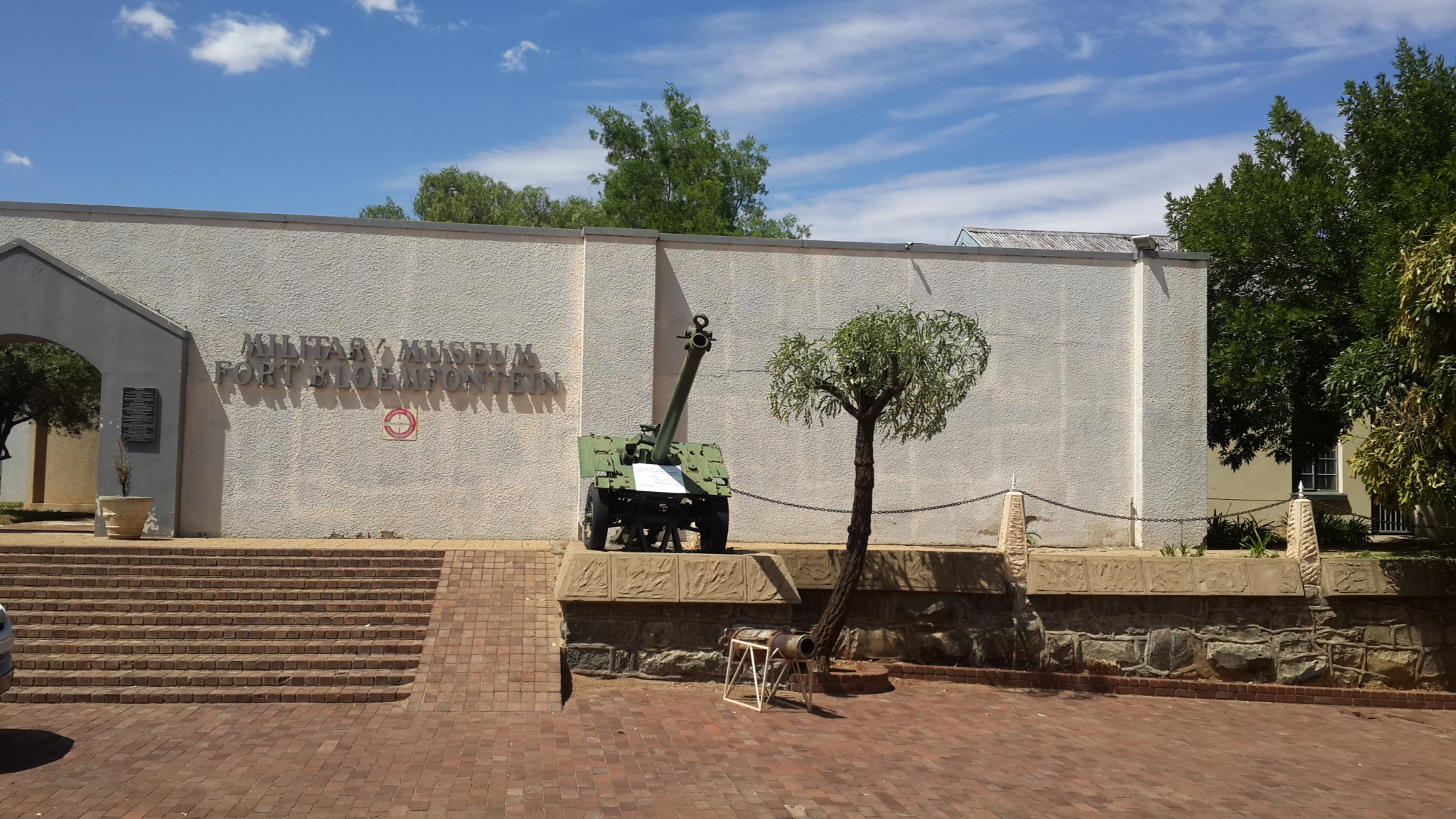
- Location: Bloemfontein (Free State), South Africa
- Coordinates: 29.1248°S 26.2215°E
- Type: Military museum
- Visitors: Monday to Friday (08:00 - 16:00)
- Website: www.fssacr.gov.za/internet/index.php/Queens_Fort

Queen's Fort Military Museum is a museum in Bloemfontein, South Africa, which depicts all major wars in the Free State from the 1800s. The building was erected in 1848 and put to use for the first time in 1849. Along the years, it has been used as military headquarters, a hospital, an asylum or mental institution, and a prison.

== Beginning ==
The idea to erect this building came after the Battle of Boomplaats (fought near Jagersfontein between the British and the Voortrekker on 28 August 1848). Major Henry Douglas Warden was instructed to build the Fort by Harry Smith to replace Fort Dury, which was situated at the Corner of Markgraaf and St Andrew’s Streets, in Bloemfontein. The building was then named in honour of Queen Victoria, but later changed to The Fort. Currently, it is known as Military Museum.

By 6 October 1848, new rampart walls had been built and the Fort was completed the following year. At first, the building was not an impressive one, and it was regarded as ineffective. Four nine-pounder and three six-pounder guns were mounted on the walls. These weapons were regarded as antiquated, obsolete and useless iron guns. Its powder magazine which was mounted inside the Fort, collapsed during heavy rain in 1850. The Fort was managed by two companies of the 45th Regiment, one company of the Cape Corps and 25 artillerymen.

After the establishment of the Orange Free State, the building was taken over by Republican forces. After this exercise, the Fort was not used and all efforts to have it maintained were an exercise in futility. When a new Captain - FW Albrecht - was appointed as a commander of the Orange Free State Artillery in 1879, he ensured that the Fort was entirely rebuilt. This is when barracks for soldiers were built (1882), and a stable for horses was also built in 1888. The reconstruction of the Fort then ensued. Convicts from all parts of the Republic were transferred to the Fort to work there. The Fort was then completed in 1892 and the second stable only added in 1896.

In 1900, the British again took ownership of the building and parts of it were turned into a military hospital, while the rest served as quarters for the Royal Engineers – one of the corps for the British Army. On 13 March 1900, the Orange Free State capital surrendered to the British. Lord Roberts then made his formal entrance into Bloemfontein that afternoon. The Coldstream Guards, part of the British Army, then took over the possession of the Fort and it became used as a prison, a hospital and later in 1902, as the headquarters of the South African Constabulary - a para-military body which was established at the end of 1900 with the hope that it would take over from British troops after the war. In 1930, it was taken over by the Union Defence Force and became headquarters of the Free State Command. On 6 June 1942, it became the headquarters of 23rd Battalion of the National Volunteer Brigade.

== The fort as a prison and mental institution ==
Following the 1914 Maritz rebellion (against the South African government’s decision to support Britain in the war against Germany, leaders such as General CR De Wet were held at the Fort, including many of his supporters during their trial. In 1916, the Fort took over the services of Oranje Hospital and was thus used as a mental institution for the criminally insane. David Pratt who shot the then South African Prime Minister – Hendrik Verwoerd twice at point blank range with a .22 pistol, was incarcerated at the Fort. Pratt was found to not be held criminally liable for shooting the prime minister after reports from five different psychiatrists. On 26 September 1960, he was committed to the Fort where he died a year later in October 1961 – having committed suicide by hanging himself with a rolled-up bed sheet.

== Other uses ==
In 1972, the Fort was used as the base of the South African Defence Force and changed its operations into a museum. In 1990, the museum was declared a heritage site under the National Monument Act of 1969. The declaration covers the arched entrance, earth banks and rampart walls, the museum building and land within the rampart walls, the old stable, the canon store and the dwelling house known as Blue Lodge situated on erf 1915. In 1980, the museum fell under the administration of the Orange Free State Provincial Government (Later called Free State Provincial Government). This museum falls under the Department of Sport Arts Culture and Recreation – Provincial Museums.

== Museum exhibitions ==
The museum depicts all major military conflicts in the Free State from 1820, as well as the struggle against apartheid. These exhibitions include:

- San and Basotho conflicts
- Difaqane
- The stories of Mzilikazi of the Matebele
- The story of Hendrik Potgieter and the Battle of Vegkop (which took place near Heilbron on 16 October 1836)
- The battle of Swartkoppies (1845) where Adam Kok - with assistance from the British - defeated the Trekboer (this battle took place on 2 May 1845 outside Trompsburg)
- Andries Pretorius - who outstated Major Warden during the battle of Boomplaats (1848).
- The Battle of Viervoet of 1851 where King Moshoeshoe defeated the allied forces of Korana, Griquas, Barolong and the British under Major Warden.
- The Battle of Berea (1852)
- The Battle of Marabeng
- Free State–Basotho Wars
- The First and Second World Wars
- South African War - Anglo-Boer Wars
- Maritz rebellion
- History of the liberation movements in South Africa (Umkhonto we Sizwe and Poqo)

Tanks and Guns on terrain of the Military Museum

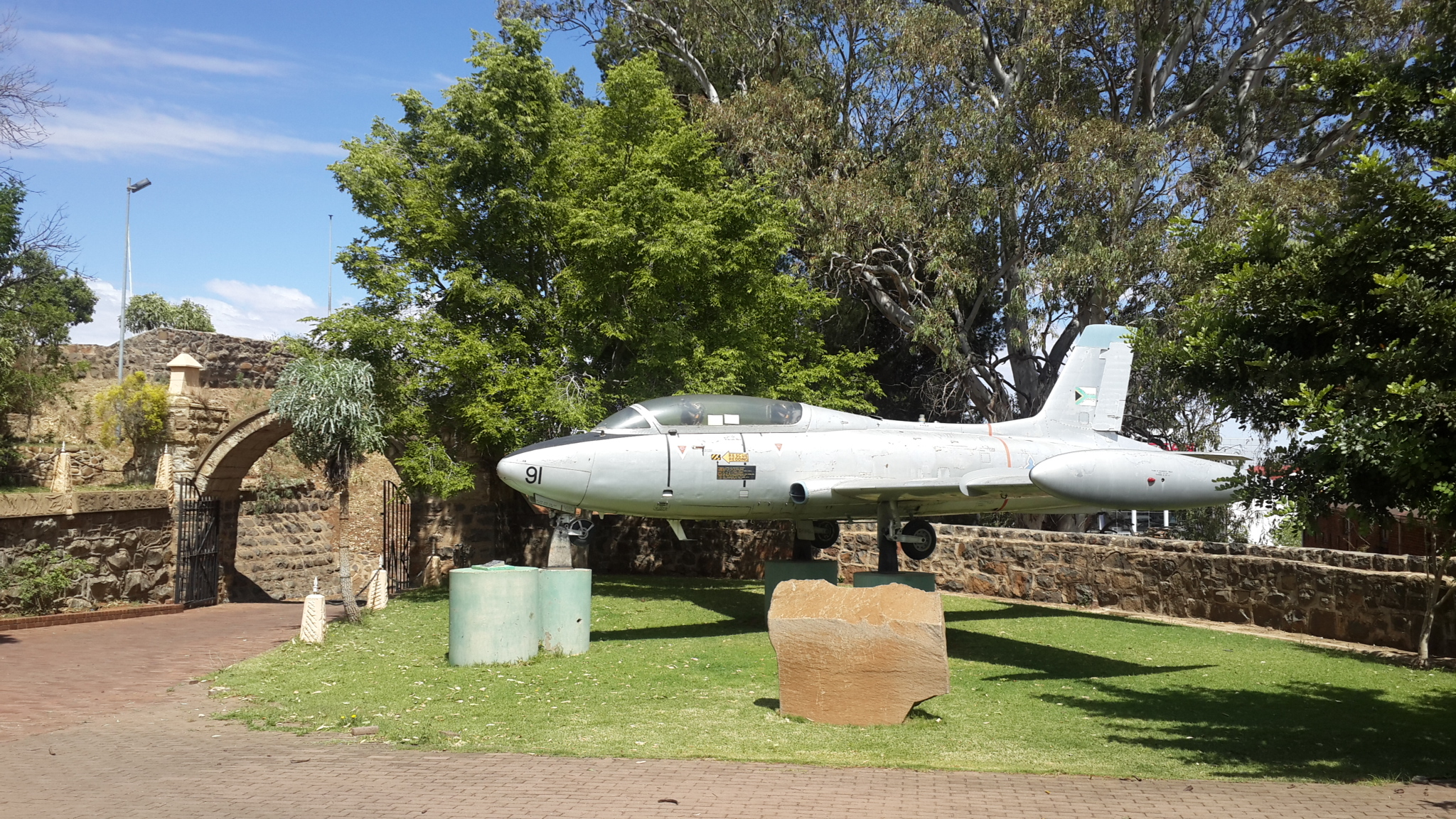
Military Tank found in the yard of the Military Museum as part of exhibitions Bloemfontein.

- Quick-Firing heavy anti-aircraft gun MK II
- Three-inch Mortar on carriage
- Six-pounder anti-tank gun
- Self-propelled gun
- Field gun MK II
- Anti-tank gun
- Quick-firing light anti-aircraft Bofors gun (x2)
- Sherman medium tank M4/105 (FB 247)
- Sherman medium tank M4A1 (W) (FB245)

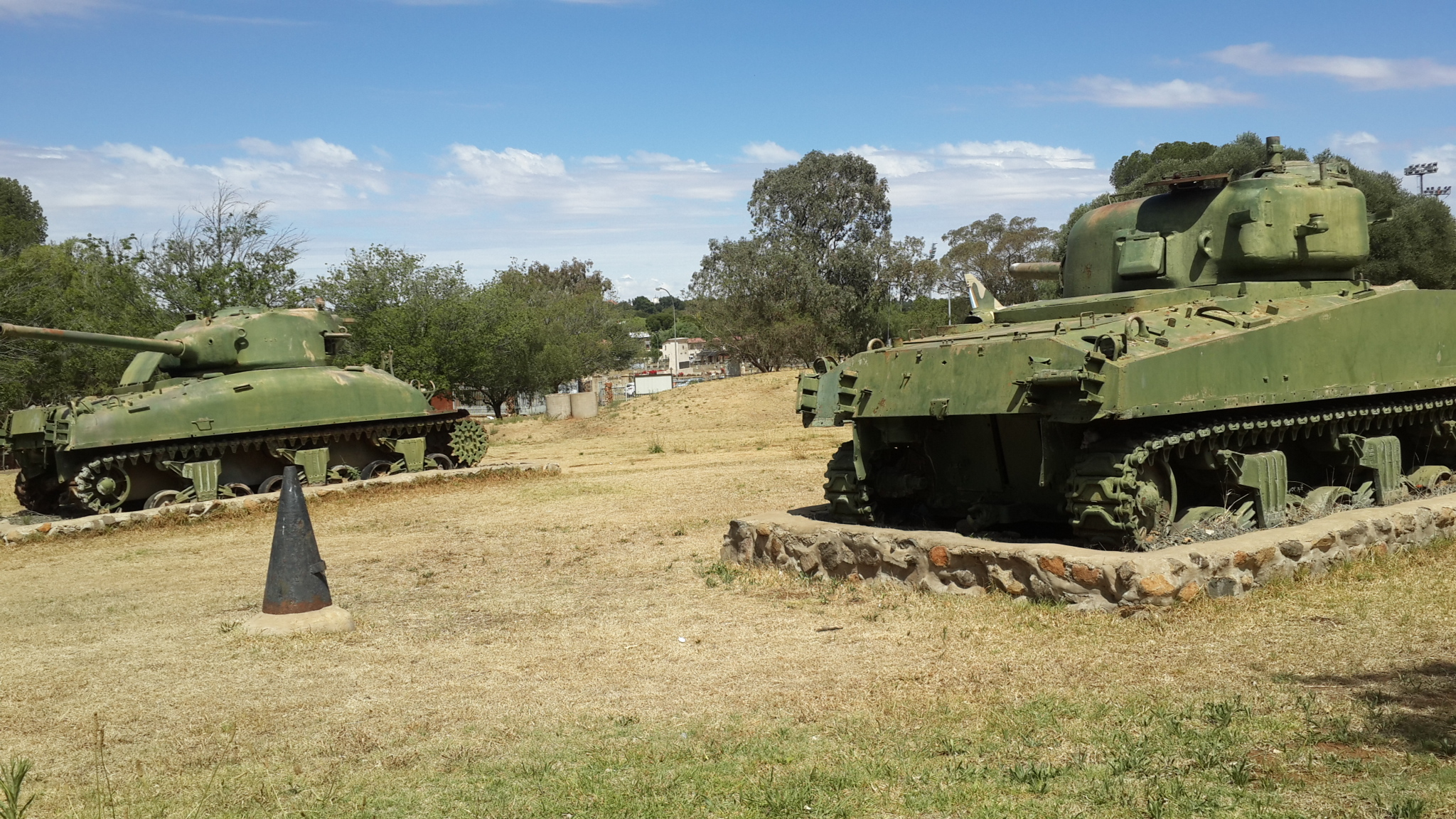
Sherman Medium Tanks found in the yard of the Military Museum as part of exhibitions Bloemfontein.

- Stuart M3A1 light tank "honey" (FB 871 and FB 872)
- Eland MK 7/90 armoured car (FB 248)
- Armoured reconnaissance car MK IV
- Combat tank elephant MK 1A (FBN 453)
- Nine-pounder muzzle-loader cannon
- Four-pounder mercantile cannon (FB 2141)

== See also ==
- List of heritage sites in Free State
