= Thomas Mtobi Mapikela =

South African politician and businessman

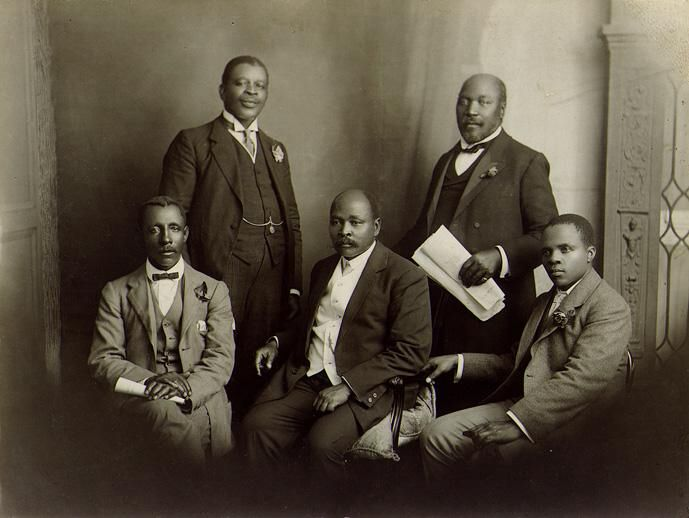
- The 1914 South African Native National Congress delegation to Britain (L-R: Walter Rubusana, Thomas Mapikela, Saul Msane, John Dube, and Sol Plaatje)
- Born: 12 November 1869; Hleuhoeng Lesotho
- Died: 1945 (aged 75–76); Bloemfontein
- Occupations: Builder; Politician; Carpenter
- Years active: 1903–1945
- Known for: Founding member and speaker of the South African Native National Congress

Thomas Mtobi Mapikela (1869–1945) was one of the founding fathers of the South African Native National Congress which was formed 1912 and, in 1923, became the African National Congress. He was a carpenter by profession, but soon played a significant role in politics at the height of his career. He is renowned for his contribution towards the attainment of democracy in South Africa.

== Early life ==
Thomas Mtobi Mapikela was born on 12 November 1869 in a place called Hleuhoeng in Lesotho, which is approximately 10 kilometres south of Ficksburg. He was a descendant of the Hlubi by birth. His family later moved to the Cape Colony where Mapikela received his primary education in Queenstown. He did his tertiary education at the Grahamstown Natives’ College where he qualified as a cabinet maker.

== Professional career ==
In 1892, at the age of 23, Mapikela moved to Bloemfontein and settled in a township called Waaihoek where he worked as a carpenter and a builder. It was during this time that he became active in politics. The Waaihoek Township was situated close to where the Bloemfontein power station and cooling towers stand today. There also stands the founding home of the African National Congress – the Wesleyan School Church. In Waaihoek, Mapikela owned two houses which were demolished during the forced removal of black people from the area. Black people from Waaihoek were then moved to Batho Location. He was not permitted to own two houses and then subsequently built himself a double-storey house. He was the only person in the whole of Batho Township who was permitted to own a double-storey house. Batho Township was laid out in 1918 and the building of the new houses commenced soon thereafter.

In 1903, Mapikela set up his own independent building contracting enterprise. He was engaged in making furniture of many descriptions for schools around Bloemfontein. In a speech on 25 November 1940, Mapikela said:

   I am the man who made all the furniture for Grey College and the University of the Orange Free State and the Europeans, some Europeans, asked why a native should be allowed to take the bread out of the mouth of their children. Not that I do not understand my trade... a member of Parliament said that he would not allow a native to do the work, which should be done by Europeans. We are dismissed. You are running the whole show... but please treat us better.[6]

Mapikela was mainly involved in the erection of timber roof trusses, and the installation or manufacturing of specialised timber items.

== Political career ==
After the annexation of the Free State Republic by Britain in 1900, black political parties emerged. Mapikela was one of the members of the delegation which went to Britain to protest the Act of the Union of South Africa. In May 1903, he became a member of the Bloemfontein Native Vigilance Committee (BNCV) which superseded the Native Committee of the Bloemfontein district. In 1904, he was instrumental in the forming of the Orange River Colony Vigilance Association and in 1906 became its office bearer. The establishment and the formation of the Native Vigilance Association and the Orange River Colony Native Association (later named the Orange River Native Congress – ORNC), paved the way for Mapikela's political prominence. These political parties mainly fought for the enfranchisement of black people, including granting full political rights to blacks and safeguarding the political, social and religious welfare of African people. In June 1906, Mapikela was elected the secretary general of the ORNC. In 1909, the anti-union delegation, led by William Schreiner, included Mapikela, John Tengo Jabavu, Abdullah Abdurrahman, Walter Rubusana, and Matt Fredericks. These men travelled to London to protest the British government with their racist provisions of the draft of the South African Act. Their voyage was however unsuccessful as clauses of the SA Act were included in the Union of South Africa. As the president of the Free State Native Congress, Mapikela played a prominent role in the establishment of the South African Native National Congress (SANNC) in 1912, which was later in 1923, named the African National Congress. He was its official speaker for 28 years from its formation until 1940. Due to his multilingualism, this put him in a better position to continue as speaker of the organization. In 1913, he was part of the delegation which travelled to Britain, protesting against the 1913 Land Act which afforded black people only 8% of the land in South Africa. In 1919, Mapikela was involved in the drafting of the SANNC's constitution which was a policy statement of the organisation for many years after. In the 1930s, Mapikela served on the executive committees of both the ANC and the All African Convention – held in 1935 to oppose the second Hertzog (J. B. M. Hertzog) Bills and the removal of Africans in the Cape from the Common Voters roll. At the establishment of the Native Representative Council in 1937, Mapikela stood for Council and was subsequently elected as an executive member. In Council debates, he was famous for his staunch determination and stubborn character when he believed in a concept.

== Mapikela House and its significance ==
The 12-roomed Mapikela House is situated on stand number 22093 in Batho Location in Bloemfontein. It is situated at the corner of Community and Makgothi Streets. This house became the meeting place for the ANC as well as the community. On the rising of the step leading to the front door of the house, partially hidden by a second step, is the inscription ‘Ulundi-Kaya’ which literally means the ‘horizon house’. For a while, it was believed that Mapikela House was the founding venue of the ANC. However, research has concluded that this was not so. As the house in Batho was only built several years after the founding of the ANC, it is decidedly not the founding venue of the ANC. The house was built between 1923 and 1926.

As the head blockman, Mapikela would hold meetings at his house to discuss community problems such as water supply, installation of electricity and the possible promotion of black education. As a carpenter, Mapikela did a lot of work for the Bloemfontein community at large. Due to the lack of mortuaries in Mangaung, Mapikela manufactured coffins in his house to assist mainly poor communities.

Mapikela also housed prominent visitors from outside Bloemfontein in his house and therefore it became a lodging house. This house accommodated travellers from all over the country who visited Bloemfontein for personal, political and non-political reasons and who used trains as a mode of transport. Some of these travellers slept in this house due to the fact that during that time the hotels had restrictions in terms of accommodating black people. Travellers who did not want to sleep in dilapidated, unsafe waiting rooms at the stations, opted for the Mapikela House. Unfortunately, no restaurants in the city would serve black people and therefore Mapikela opened his house to black people for catering and dining services.

== Death and legacy ==
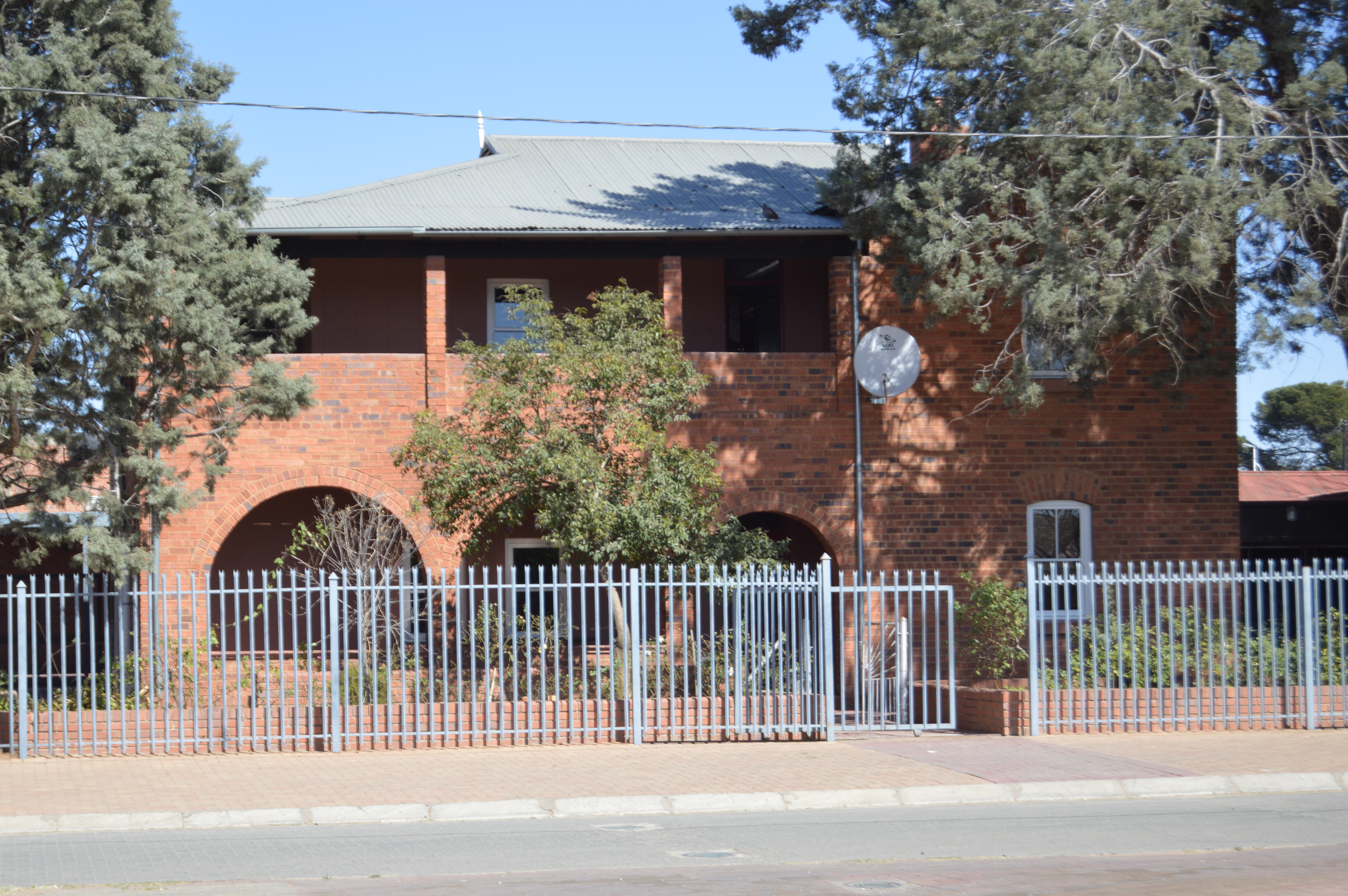
House of Thomas Mtobi Mapikela in Batho Location – Bloemfontein

Mapikela, as one of the founding members of the oldest liberation movement in Africa, continues to serve as a symbol of change, resilience and fighting against injustices towards black people in South Africa. His legacy is also recognised as a community developer. His house is in the process of being declared a heritage site, and his grave at the Heroes Acre at Phahameng Cemetery has been declared in 2016 Mapikela Road in Batho location is named after him.

== See also ==
- African National Congress
- List of heritage sites in Free State
