= Saul Msane =

South African politician and an intellectual

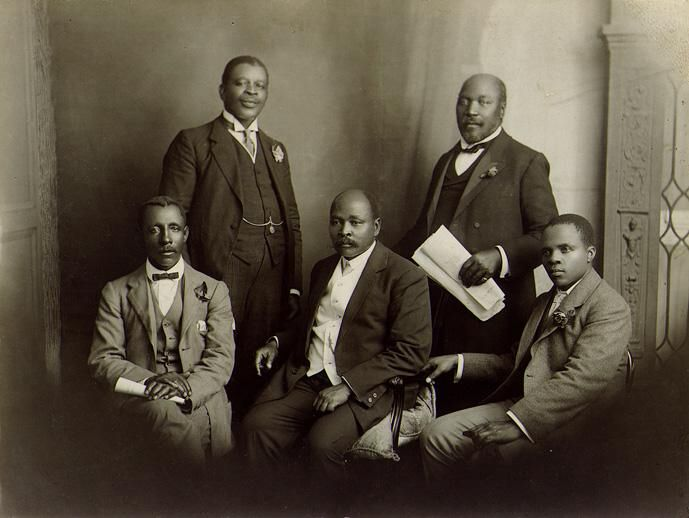
The 1914 South African Native National Congress delegation to Britain (L-R: Walter Rubusana, Thomas Mapikela, Saul Msane, John Dube, and Sol Plaatje).

Saul Msane was South African politician and an intellectual, a prominent member of the Wesleyan Methodist Church and a newspaper editor. He was one of the founding members of the African National Congress and served as its Secretary General from 1917 to 1924.

== Early life ==
Msane was born in Edendale in 1851 in what is today the KwaZulu-Natal province of South Africa. His father, Matthew (circa 1816 to 1904), was born and lived in Zululand around the time King Shaka Zulu ruled. He was a teacher between 1882 and 1892 and led a Zulu choir to London in the latter year. Msane worked as a compound manager at Salisbury and Jubilee Mine in Johannesburg from 1895 to 1914.

== Editor and politician ==
In 1896 Msane launched the newspaper Imvo. Inkanyiso yase Natal which was being edited by Solomon Khumalo, was seen as a rival to John Teng Jabavu's newspaper at the time. The newspaper was published in both Johannesburg and Natal, and Msane was working to have it as a national newspaper.

In 1910 Msane collaborated with Levi Thomas Mvabaza and launched Umlomo wa Bantu (People’s Mouth). Umlomo’s aim was to “unify all African tribes into one people."

Once he became the editor, Msane was accused of being a polemicist and dismissed. In one meeting of the Congress in Kroonstad, Msane challenged John Dube in public about his style of management of the party’s finances. In 1912 he attended the inaugural meeting of the SANNC in Bloemfontein, where he was one of the speakers. After the formation of SANNC, his newspaper, Umlomo wa Bantu, and other newspapers formed Abantu Batho, which became the official newspaper for SANNC.

== Death ==
He died at the home of a Dr Tittlestad, at Nkandla, KwaZulu-Natal on 6 November 1919.
