= Louw Wepener =

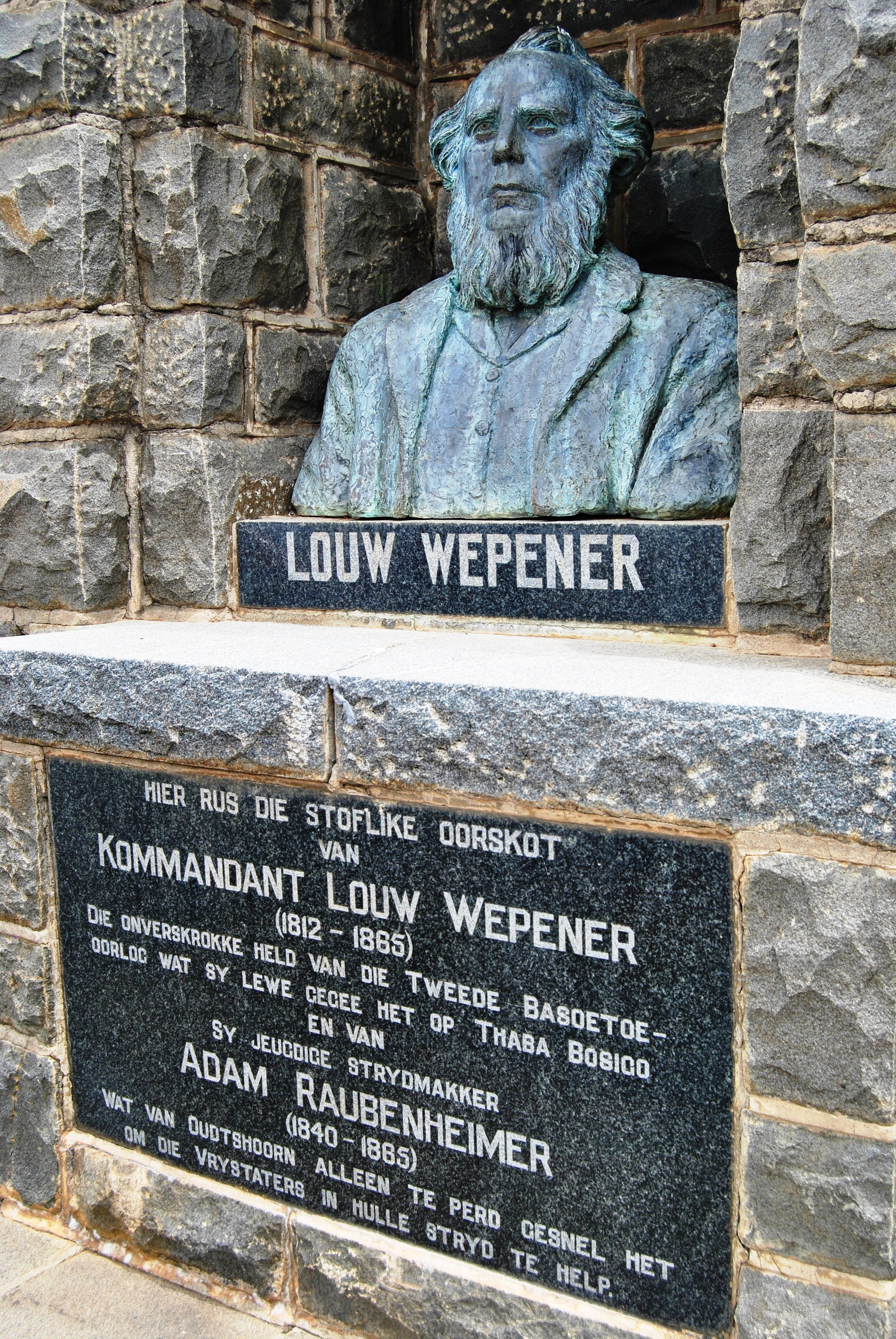
- Grave of Louw Wepener
- Born: 21 July 1812; Graaff-Reinet
- Died: 15 August 1865 (aged 53); Thaba Bosiu Lesotho
- Relatives: Hester Susanna Nel and Hilletje Maria Levina van Aardt
- Military career
- Rank: Commandant
- Conflicts: Frontier Wars Free State–Basotho Wars

Lourens Jacobus (Louw) Wepener was born on 21 July 1812. He was the son of a German immigrant – Frederick Jacobus Wepener – and a Cape Colony woman – Johanna Maria Erasmus. Wepener was born in Graaf-Reinet and lived with his uncle – Lourens. He was christened by Reverend Andrew Murray of the Dutch Reformed Church. Wepener was first married to Hester Susanna Nel and then later to Hilletje Maria Levina Van Aardt. He had nine children with his second wife.

== Military career ==
Wepener participated in some Frontier Wars (1834–1853) as Acting Field Cornet. He moved to the farm De Nek in Aliwal North in 1850 where he took part in the Eighth Frontier War (1850–1853) (Xhosa wars) and was promoted to Commandant due to his outstanding leadership.

He later migrated to the Orange Free State where he bought two farms in Bethulie district – Constantia and Moordernaarspoort. When he arrived in Orange Free State, Wepener was appointed Acting Commandant. He took part in the Free State–Basotho Wars – which were a series of wars fought between Moshoeshoe I and the Orange Free State.

The three are the Senekal War (1858), Seqiti War which included two conflicts in 1856 to 1866 and 1867 to 1868. The wars resulted in the Orange Free State acquiring large tracts of land from Basotho. The Free State's forces were led by Commandant-General Johan Fick and Commandant Louw Wepener.

The first attack on Thaba Bosiu failed on 8 August 1865, the Boers tried again on 15 August. As he ascended Thaba Bosiu, Wepener and his agterryer had made some progress up the Khubelu pass but as soon as Basotho soldiers spotted them, Wepener was shot and he died on the spot. Basotho charged and about 11 Boers were killed and about 30 were injured.

== Death ==
The loss of Wepener was a huge loss in the Free State as he was regarded as a remarkable and brave leader. Two of his entrusted men – Carl Mathey and Chris du Randt, went up at night to go and look for his body. They dragged it into a shallow trench next to Adam Raubenheimer, another fallen Boer. It was reported that Moshoeshoe ordered his warriors to cut out Wepener's heart out and eat it. This is due to Moshoeshoe I being impressed with the bravery of Wepener and thus he believed that if each of his warriors ate a piece of his heart, they would gain his bravery. He was first buried at Thaba Bosiu by Dr Prosper Lautre (1818–1893) of the Paris Evangelical Mission Society.

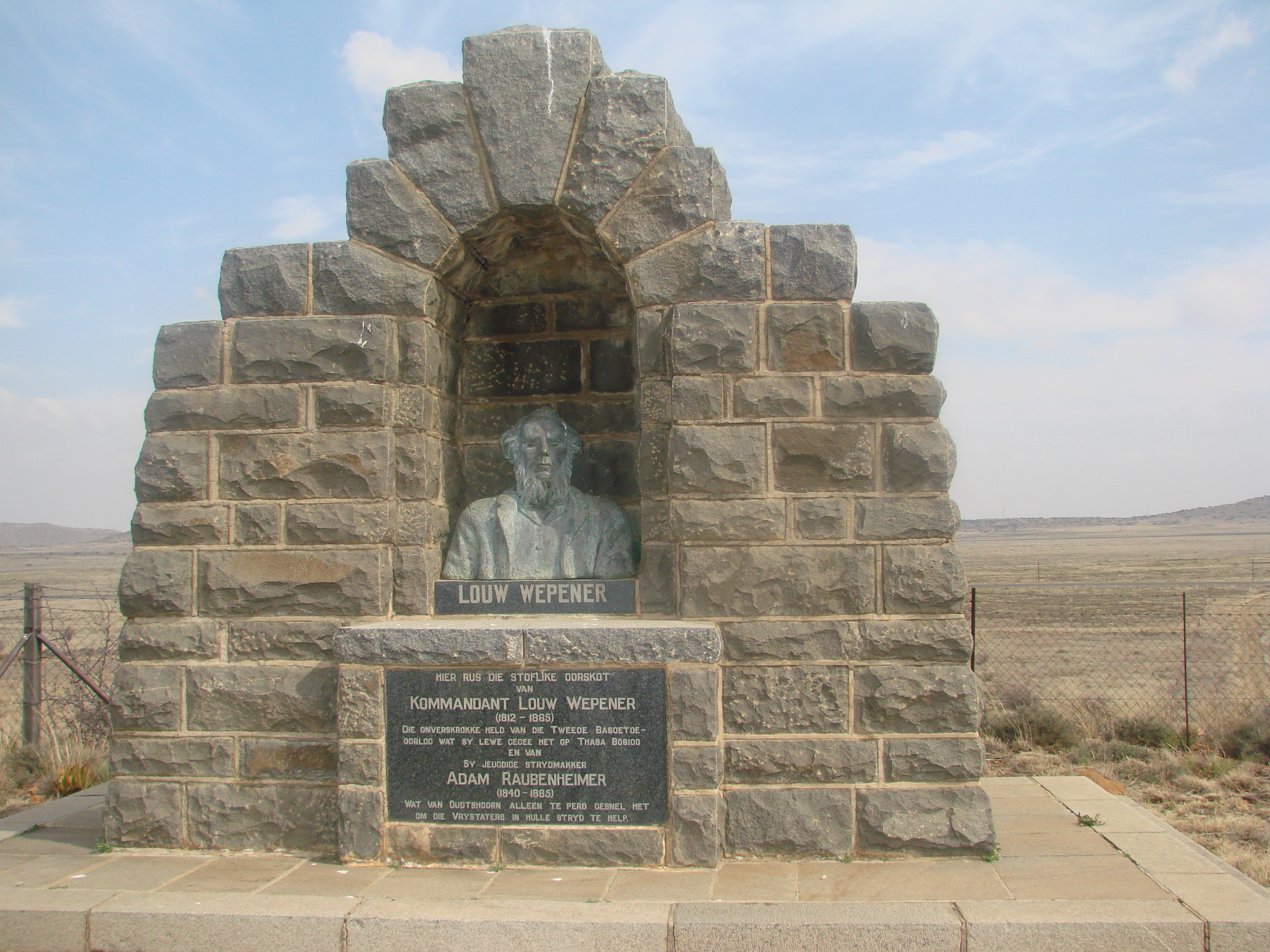
Grave of Louw Wepener at his farm in Constantia Bethulie.

Eleven months after the death of Wepener, his son – Dick Wepener – and four of his friends went to Thaba Bosiu to collect his father's remains for a proper burial. King Moshoeshoe I's son – Tladi – took Dick to where his father was buried. This is when Tladi told Dick that his father's heart had been eaten by warriors. His body was taken to be buried at the family farm in Constantia. The pass at Thaba Bosiu known as Khubelu pass where Wepener was killed is also known as the Wepener's pass to commemorate his death.

== Honours ==
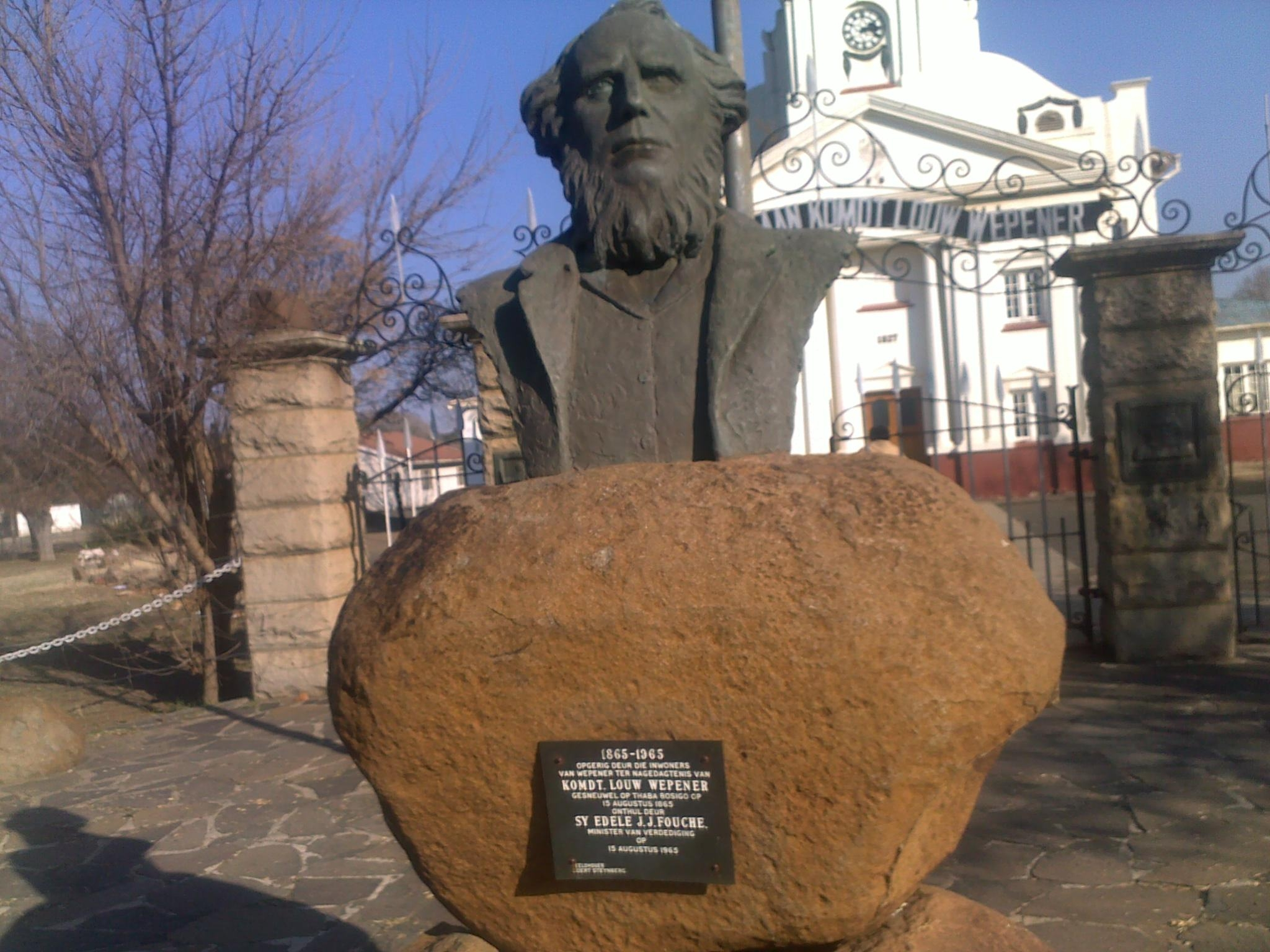
Bust of Louw Wepener in front of the Wepener town hall Wepener.

- A town founded in 1867 was named after Wepener. This town is found in the Free State on the banks of Jammersbergspuit, a tributary of the Caledon River.
- There is also a monument in his honour at the front of the town hall in Wepener.
- On the N6 to Aliwal North, there is a little monument in honour of Wepener.
- Two military awards were named after him – Louw Wepener decoration (1952 – 1975) and the Louw Wepener medal (1967–1975), which were issued by the South African Defence Force to its members for courageous or heroic deeds in saving lives.
