= 'Mantšebo =

Regent of Basutoland
- Reign: 28 January 1941 – 12 March 1960
- Predecessor: Gabasheane Masupha (as regent)
- Successor: Moshoeshoe II
- Born: 1902
- Died: 1964 (aged 61–62)
- Spouse: Seeiso
- House: House of Moshoeshoe
- Religion: Roman Catholicism

'Mantšebo (in full: 'Mantšebo Amelia 'Matšaba; 1902–1964) was the ruler of Basutoland (present-day Lesotho) from 1941 to 1960, as the regent for her stepson, the future Moshoeshoe II.

'Mantšebo was the first of the three wives of Seeiso, who was paramount chief from 1939 to 1940. She was elected regent a month after his death, becoming the only female ruler during Lesotho's colonial period. Her early years in power were marked by disputes over both the legitimacy of her rule and her guardianship of her stepson (Seeiso's heir). However, 'Mantšebo retained the regency for over 19 years, and laid the foundations for Lesotho's current constitutional monarchy.

== Early life ==
'Mantšebo's name at birth was Moipone Nkoebe. She was the daughter of Sempe Nkoebe, who was a chief in the Quthing region and a "ranking member of the royal dynasty". After completing her primary education, 'Mantšebo married Seeiso Griffith, the son of Griffith Lerotholi (who had succeeded his brother Letsie Lerotholi as paramount chief of Basutoland in 1913). She was her husband's first wife (or "senior wife"), and bore him a daughter, Ntšebo (who was ineligible to succeed to the throne). Seeiso married twice more, and had one son each by his second and third wives. His son by his second wife, Bereng (the future Moshoeshoe II), became his heir when he acceded to the throne in July 1939.

== Regency ==
=== Power struggle ===
Seeiso died on 26 December 1940. He had been ill for some time, and during his illness authorised his chief counsellor, Gabasheane Masupha, to act as paramount chief while he was incapacitated. As Seeiso's heir, Bereng, was only two years old, Gabasheane initially continued as acting paramount chief after Seeiso's death. In January 1941, however, a council of the leading Basotho chiefs (collectively known as the "Sons of Moshoeshoe") was called to elect a permanent regent during Bereng's minority. 'Mantšebo was one of two candidates, along with Bereng Griffith (Seeiso's half-brother). The council voted 44–23 in her favour, and she had the support of all but one of the principal chiefs. She was subsequently recognised as regent by the British Resident Commissioner, Edmund Richards, and the Secretary of State for the Colonies, Lord Moyne.

Despite the council's ruling, Bereng Griffith and his supporters refused to recognise 'Mantšebo as regent, and sued her in the High Court of Basutoland (which had only been established in 1938). Bereng put forward an argument that traditional law and custom prevented women from functioning as chiefs. He also contended that Seeiso and 'Mantšebo had married under the levirate custom, and therefore, as his brother's widow, he was obliged to marry her. However, the presiding judge rejected both of those arguments and upheld the decision of the council, allowing 'Mantšebo to continue as regent. Bereng continued to agitate for power until 1949, when he and the former regent Gabasheane were convicted of muti murder and hanged.

=== Guardianship of Bereng ===
When 'Mantšebo was elected regent in 1940, she was also made the guardian of Seeiso's heir, her step-son Bereng. 'Mantšebo and Bereng's mother, 'Mabereng, were said to have "loathed each other thoroughly". 'Mabereng and her supporters contrived to keep him away from the direct control of the regent, as it was feared that 'Mantšebo (or one of her allies) might have him killed. At one point, rumours of an assassination attempt meant the boy was hidden in a cave for two days. As Bereng grew older, however, 'Mantšebo began to have more of a say in his affairs. She arranged to have him raised in her own Catholic faith, and rejected a plan to have him taught at a non-denominational government school, despite the strong objections of his mother (a Protestant), the Legislative Council, and the Resident Commissioner. This conflict over schooling resulted in "a full-scale war between the royal widows", which only ended when Bereng left Lesotho to continue his education in England.

=== Politics ===
'Mantšebo has been described as a "shrewd and willing" leader who was skilled in dealing with the British administration, but yet unable to develop an "alternative national agenda". She employed various tactics to frustrate colonial officials, including feigning poor health and affecting frequent bouts of "tears and histrionics". Internally, 'Mantšebo laid the foundations for Lesotho's current constitutional monarchy. She agreed to consult the Basutoland National Council (the protectorate's legislative council) on certain matters, and supported the right to freedom of association, allowing political organisations to hold public meetings without interference. Basutoland's "first modern political parties" were formed in the 1950s, during her regency. However, 'Mantšebo herself was not politically neutral, and came to "informally support" the Basutoland National Party, which was led by Leabua Jonathan (a former advisor). By the late 1950s, she was facing increasing pressure to step aside and allow Bereng to assume the chiefship. Her intention was to remain regent until he had completed his university education and married. 'Mantšebo was eventually forced into "involuntary retirement" in March 1960.

== Later life and legacy ==
'Mantšebo died four years after relinquishing the regency, as "an evidently depressed and broken-hearted lady". She was the only female ruler of Basutoland prior to independence, and in southern Africa Labotsibeni of Swaziland was the only other woman to rule for a comparable length of time. In his autobiography Long Walk to Freedom, Nelson Mandela recalled a meeting with 'Mantšebo in which she chided him for his poor grasp of the Sotho language, which he said made him "realise [his] parochialism".

=== Honours ===
In the 1946 Birthday Honours, 'Mantšebo was made an Officer of the Order of the British Empire (OBE), "in recognition of the war effort of the Basuto Nation". The following year, during a deviation from a royal tour of South Africa, King George VI personally inducted her into the order in front of a crowd of thousands. His wife, Queen Elizabeth, and daughters, Princesses Elizabeth and Margaret, were also present for the ceremony.
