= Lake Letsie =

Lake and protected area in Lesotho

- Letšeng-la-Letsie (Sotho)
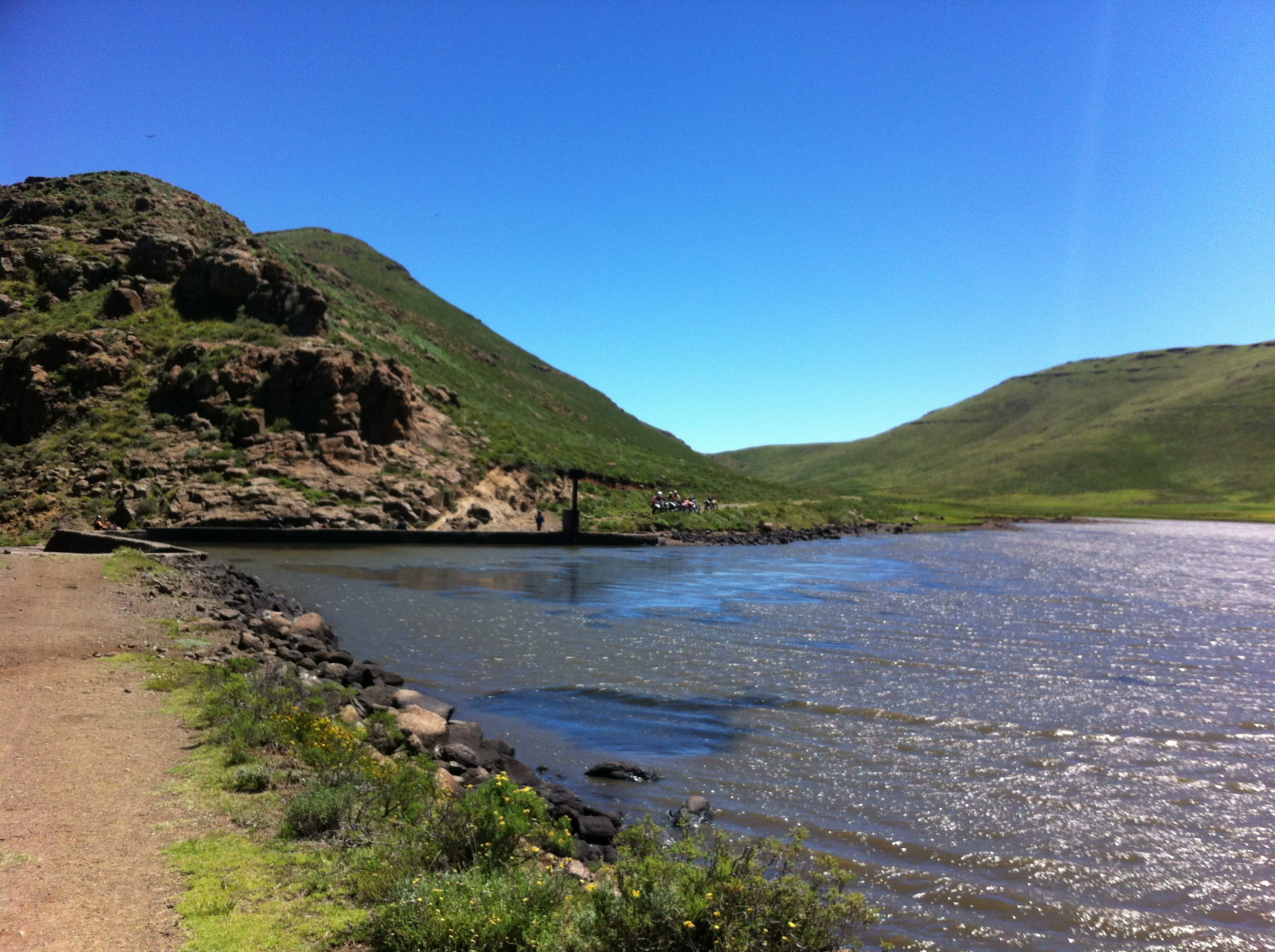
- South shore view, from east of the dam

- Location within Lesotho
- Location: Quthing District, Lesotho
- Coordinates: 30°18′35″S 28°09′55″E
- Type: Reservoir
- Etymology: Letsie II Lerotholi
- River sources: Mohlakeng River
- Catchment area: 413.9 km^{2} (159.8 mi^{2})
- Basin countries: Lesotho
- Built: 1968
- Surface area: 38 hectares (94 acres)
- Average depth: 1 metre (3 ft)
- Surface elevation: 2,400 metres (7,900 ft)

Ramsar Wetland
- Official name: Lets'eng-la-Letsie
- Designated: 1 July 2004
- Reference no.: 1388

Lake Letsie (Sotho: Letšeng-la-Letsie) is a reservoir in the Drakensberg mountains in Quthing District, Lesotho. The reservoir was formed when a smaller, natural lake was enlarged by damming the source of the Mohlakeng River in 1968. The lake and the wetlands surrounding the shore have been designated as a national protected area since 2001 and a Ramsar site since 2004.

== Features ==
Lake Letsie is an enlarged natural lake in a dammed valley at the source of the Mohlakeng River shortly above its junction with the Quthing River, a tributary of the Senqu River. The lake is located in Mphaki Community Council, Quthing District, about 200 kilometres (120 mi) southeast of Maseru in the Drakensberg mountains of southeastern Lesotho, near the South African border crossing at Ongeluksnek. Sediment cores indicate that a natural lake has existed on the site of Lake Letsie since at least the mid 1800s, but in 1968 the Mohlakeng River was dammed, and the small lake was enlarged to form a freshwater reservoir, named after former King Letsie II. The lake is broad but shallow, with a surface area of 38 hectares (94 acres) but an average depth of only 1 metre (3 ft). It is fed by a 413.9-square-kilometre (159.8 mi^{2}) catchment area and sits at an elevation of 2,400 metres (7,900 ft) above mean sea level.

== Flora and fauna ==
Lake Letsie forms the core of a highland palustrine wetland populated by the Afromontane and Afroalpine vegetation characteristic of the Drakensberg, with high levels of biodiversity and endemism. The wetland has long been used for pasture by local herdsmen, as well as for harvesting thatch, wood, and medicinal plants. Dominant plant species include Cotula paludosa, Eragrostis caesia, Haplocarpha nervosa, and Trifolium burchellianum. The entire catchment area is above the tree line and has no tree cover.

The lake and wetland serve as a stopover point for migratory birds, and their habitats support vulnerable species such as the wattled crane, blue crane, lesser kestrel, southern bald ibis, cape vulture, and yellow-breasted pipit. The lake itself supports the endangered Maluti redfin, and the protected area exhibits endemic species such as Sloggett's vlei rat, the mountain pipit, and the Maluti river frog.

== Conservation ==
Sediment cores from the lake bed show low but rising levels of air pollutants such as mercury, fly ash, polycyclic aromatic hydrocarbons, and polychlorinated biphenyls since the 1970s, likely because of coal-fired power stations and industrial activity in the neighboring Highveld region of South Africa. The wetlands around the lake and its catchment area are experiencing erosion related to overstocking and overgrazing, in part because the site is treated as common land open to free use for private economic exploitation.

The national government declared the lake and its catchment area a protected area in 2001, as part of the Conserving Mountain Biodiversity in Southern Lesotho project, and outlawed private use of the land, announcing plans to enclose the area and develop tourism facilities. These proposals have met with resistance from local communities, and no such developments have yet been made. On 1 July 2004 a 434-hectare (1,070-acre) protected area including the lake and its upstream wetlands was designated Lesotho's first and only Ramsar site.
