= List of wars involving Lesotho =

This is a list of wars involving Lesotho and its processing states.

Conflict	Lesotho and allies	Opponents	Results	Monarch
Battle of Viervoet (1851)	Basotho Kingdom	United Kingdom	Victory: British expedition repulsed	Moshoeshoe I
First Free State–Basotho War (1858)	Basotho Kingdom	Orange Free State	Victory: Boer invasion fails	Moshoeshoe I
Battle of Berea (1858)	Basotho Kingdom	United Kingdom	Inconclusive: Peace treaty	Moshoeshoe I
Second Free State–Basotho War (1865–1866)	Basotho Kingdom	Orange Free State; South African Republic	Defeat: Basotho Kingdom cedes land	Moshoeshoe I
Third Free State–Basotho War (1867–1868)	Basotho Kingdom	Orange Free State	Defeat (but prevention of total Boer conquest): Basutoland becomes a British protectorate	Moshoeshoe I
Morosi's Rebellion (1879)	Basotho Kingdom; United Kingdom	Baphuthi rebels	Victory: Uprising suppressed	Letsie I
Basuto Gun War (1880–1881)	Basotho rebels	United Kingdom	Victory: Final settlement in favor of the Basotho	Letsie I
BCP Uprising (1974)	Government of Lesotho	(Lesotho) BCP	Government victory: Uprising suppressed	Moshoeshoe II
LLA Guerilla War (1979–1990)	Government of Lesotho	(Lesotho) LLA	Peace treaty: Elections held in 1993, BCP wins	Moshoeshoe II
SADC intervention in Lesotho (1998)	South Africa; Botswana	(Lesotho) LDF rebels	SADC victory: Suspected coup d'état in Lesotho quelled	Letsie III
