= Everitt Lechesa Segoete =

Mosotho writer, minister, and teacher

- Portrait of Everitt Lechesa Segoete
- Born: 1858; Morifi, Cape Colony
- Died: February 7, 1923 (aged 64–65); Basutoland
- Occupations: Writer, minister, teacher
- Writing career
- Notable works: Monono ke moholi, ke mouoane (1910); Raphepheng (1913)

Everitt Lechesa Segoete (1858–1923) was a Mosotho writer, minister, and teacher. He is considered one of the earliest authors of Sesotho literature. Segoete is best known for his novel Monono ke moholi, ke mouoane (1910), his second book, Raphepheng (1913), as well as being the teacher of novelist Thomas Mofolo.

== Life ==
Everitt Lechesa Segoete was born in 1858 at Morifi, now Mohale's Hoek, during Senekal's War between King Moshoeshoe I and white settlers. His Sotho name, Lechesa, meaning "the burner" or "burning," was given to him because of the burning of Basotho villages by Boer commandos during the conflict. The family later moved to Maphutseng, where Segoete began attending a school run by the Reverend David-Frédéric Ellenberger of the Paris Evangelical Missionary. When Ellenberger moved to Masitise, Segoete followed. He went on to obtain his teacher's certificate, but instead of becoming a teacher he left for the Cape Colony. While there, Segoete faced various challenges, rumoured to include going on the run from police and narrowly escaping being murdered. These events appear to have inspired his novel published years later.

Segoete then returned home, taking up work at the missionary press at Morija, before moving back to the Cape Colony to work at a newspaper. He returned again, to what was now Basutoland, where he became headmaster of the school at Qomoqomong, now in Quting District. Segoete attended seminary, graduating in April 1896 and becoming ordained in 1899. He went on to serve as a minister at Hermone, now in Mafeteng, then in Koeneng, now Leribe, before returning to Hermone.

Segoete died on February 7, 1923.

== Work ==
Segoete is recognised for his contributions to early Sesotho literature. In 1910, two years after Mofolo's Moeti oa bochabela appeared, he published his first novel, Monono ke moholi, ke mouoane, and a collection of religious meditations, Mefiboshethe kapa pheello ea molimo ho moetsalibe (Mefiboshete, or the Patience of God to the Sinner). This pattern of producing secular and religious texts would characterise the rest of his career.

Monono ke moholi, ke muouane is the story of Khitšane, an old man who is introduced at the end of his life. Khitšane, who is largely understood to be a namesake for the author, narrates his life to his neighbor, Tim, including his journey to Witswatersrand, conversion to Christianity, and return home. As such, the book sets out a moral tail of redemption.

Three years later he produced a short book, Raphepheng, which appeared as an English translation in 1930 with the subtitle, The Life of the Basotho of Long Ago. At the same time he published, Moea oa bolisa (The Spirit of Pastralism), another religious text. Raphepheng details, via a first person narrative, aspects of Basotho traditional life. The eponymous narrator glorifies the past and laments the passing of tradition.

Following his death, a final devotional work by Segoete was published, Mohlala oa Jesu Kreste (The Example of Jesus Christ).

== Complete works ==
- Segoete, Everitt Lechesa (1910). Monono ke moholi, ke mouoane (in Southern Sotho). Morija, Basutoland: Morija Sesuto Book Depot. OCLC 3329469.
- —— (1913). Raphepheng (in Southern Sotho). Morija, Basutoland: Morija Sesuto Book Depot. OCLC 22614325.
- —— (1930). Moea oa bolisa (in Southern Sotho). OCLC 869824725.
- —— (1924). Mohlala oa Jesu Kreste (in Southern Sotho). Morija: Sesuto Book Depot. OCLC 869824724.
- —— (1930). ""Raphepheng," "The Life of the Basotho of Long Ago."". Bantu Studies. 4 (1): 153–159. OCLC 4805001925.

== Sources ==
- Gérard, Albert S (1971). Four African literatures: Xhosa, Sotho, Zulu, Amharic. Berkeley: University of California Press.
- Kunene, Daniel P. (2004). "African-language literatures of southern Africa". In Irele, F. Abiola; Gikandi, Simon (eds.). The Cambridge History of African and Caribbean Literature. Cambridge University Press. pp. 289–305.
- Maake, Nhlanhla P. (1992). "A Survey of Trends in the Development of African Language Literatures in South Africa: With Specific Reference to Written Southern Sotho Literature c1900-1970s". African Languages and Cultures. 5 (2): 157–188. ISSN 0954-416X.
- Maake, Nhlanhla (2006). "Watermarks in the Sesotho Novels of the Twentieth Century". Research in African Literatures. 37 (3): 65–82.
- Maphike, Pule Ranaileng Stephen (1991). History of southern sotho literature as system, 1930-1960 (PhD thesis). University of South Africa.
