= Thomas Mofolo =

Mosotho writer (1876 - 1948)

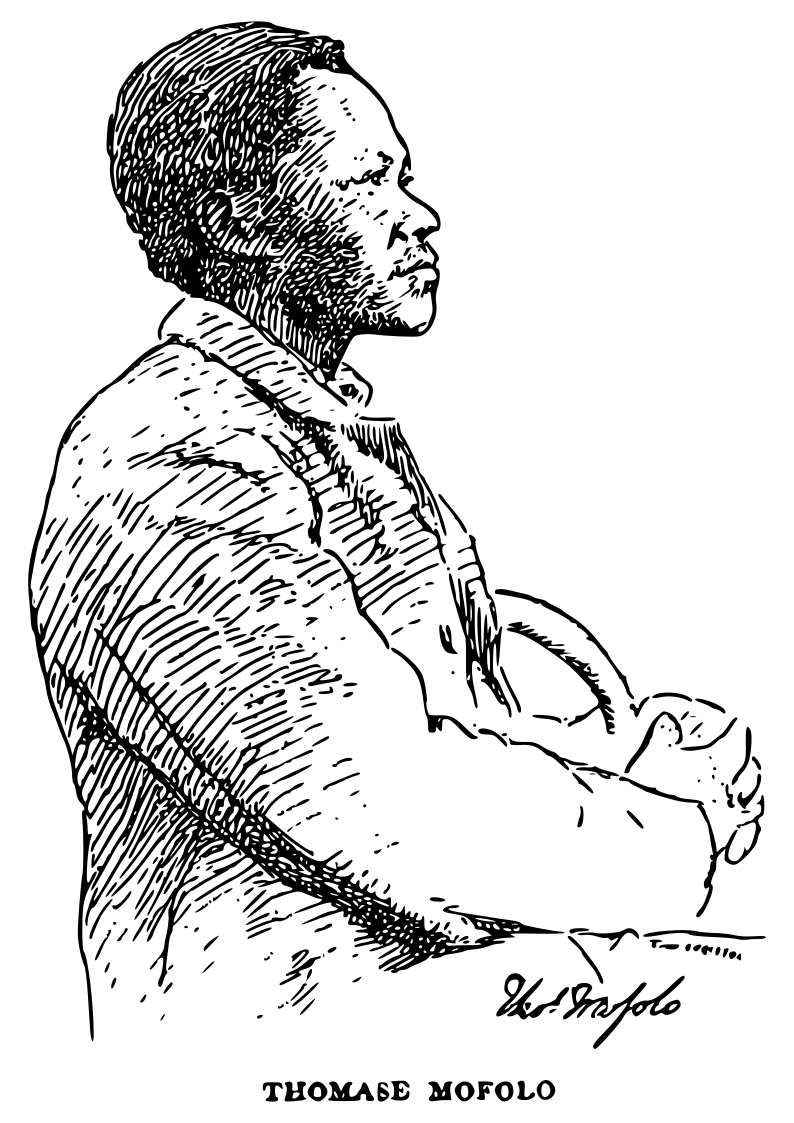
- Sketch of Thomas Mofolo by Frédéric Christol
- Born: 22 December 1876; Ha Khojane, Mafeteng, Basutoland
- Died: 8 September 1948 (aged 71); Teyateyaneng, Basutoland
- Occupation: Novelist
- Writing career
- Period: 1907 - 1925
- Notable works: Moeti oa bochabela (1907); Pitseng (1910); Chaka (1925)

Thomas Mokopu Mofolo (22 December 1876 – 8 September 1948) is often regarded as the first African novelist, and the greatest author to write one in an African language. His body of work, which consists of three books composed between 1905 and 1910, were first written in Sesotho, and then widely translated.

He is best known for his third book, Chaka, a fictional retelling of the story of the rise and fall of the Zulu emperor-king Shaka.

== Life ==
While Thomas Mofolo's work has been widely examined, his life story has been largely overlooked and no complete biography has been published. What is known stems from a short autobiographical sketch that appeared in 1930, the work of Daniel Kunene in the 1980s, and more recent archival research by the curator of Morija Museum and Archives.

The third child of Abner and Aleta Mofolo, Thomas Mofolo was born in Ha Khojane, a village in the Mafeteng District of the British colony of Basutoland.

His family were members of the Protestant church and remained loyal to the Cape Colony forces during the Basuto Gun War, which led them to flee their home and settle in Mafeteng. Having spent his early year herding the family's cattle, Mofolo began his education at the age of 10 or 12 under the guidance of Everitt Lechesa Segoete at Qomoqomong. Segoete was a great influence and would go on to be published himself. A polyglot, Mofolo learned isiXhosa and English during these years, while speaking Sesotho and Dutch with his family.

Mofolo continued his education, first at Masitise and then in 1894 at Morija where he attended Bible School. In 1896, he moved again to Thabeng for teacher training. Between 1896 and 1898 rinderpest killed 95% of cattle in the region, and Mofolo's family could no longer pay his school fees. By 1898, at the age of 22, Mofolo was able to complete his studies and gained employment at the Morija Sesuto Book Depot, which acted as the centre of publishing in Basutoland.

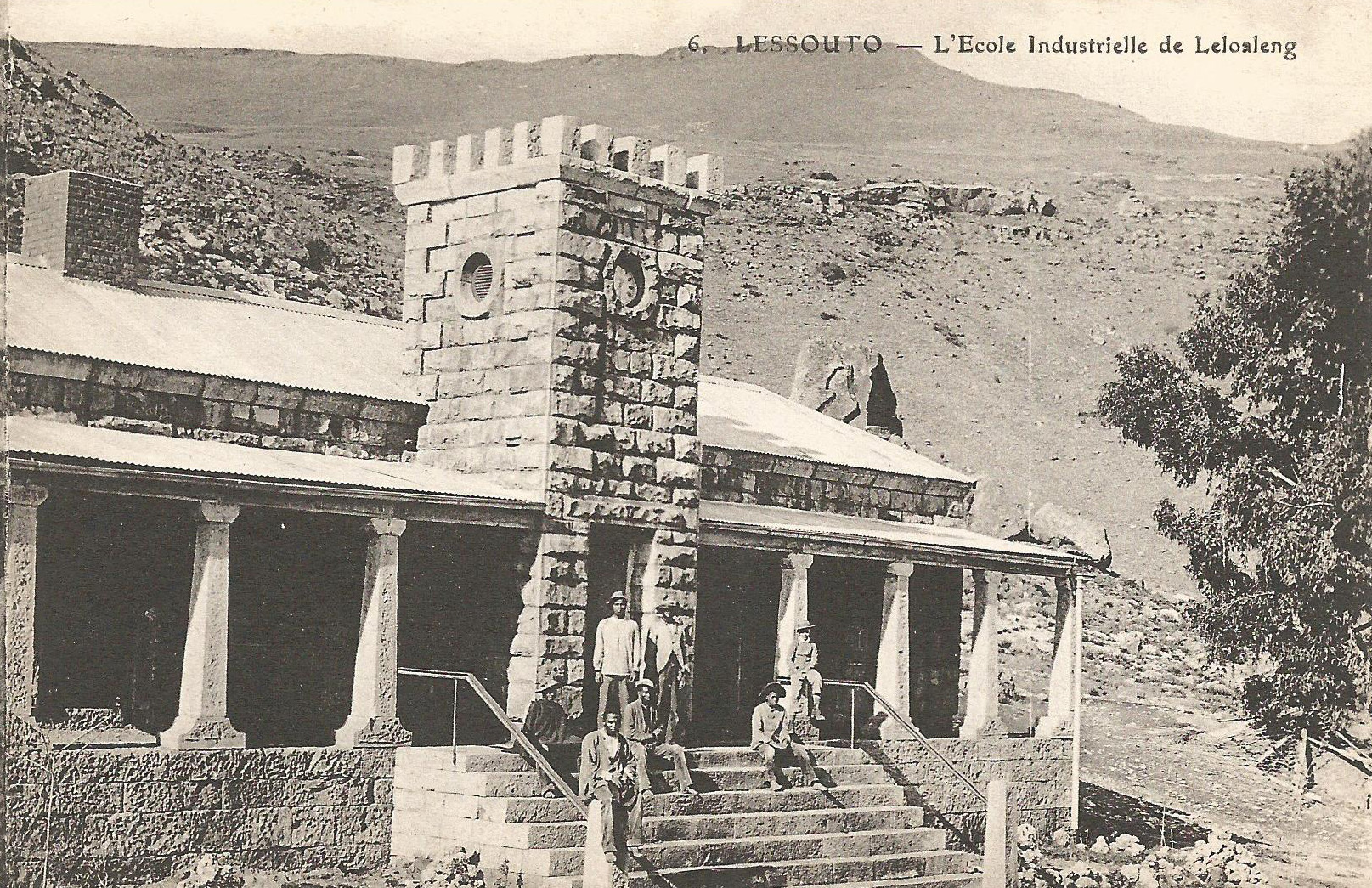
Leloaleng Industrial School

His time at the Book Depot was cut short by the Anglo-Boer War, which led to shortages of paper and other materials. Mofolo returned to education, this time to Leloaleng Industrial School, where he learned carpentry, before becoming a teacher at Maseru.

In 1904 Mofolo returned to the Morija Sesuto Book Depot, and that year married Francina Matšeliso Shoarane, who had been educated in the Cape Colony. The previous year, Francina had published a short letter, which was very uncommon for a woman at that time. Their first child was born in 1908. During the next few years, Mofolo read widely and developed his own interest in writing literature. He also became politically active, becoming in 1907 a founding member of the Lekhotla la Tsoelo-pele (English: Basutoland Progressive Association).

Mofolo fled Morija in 1910 following an adulterous relationship, and moved to Johannesburg to work as a labour recruiter. He returned to Basutoland in 1912, continuing his work as a labour agent for a mining group as well as his own private ventures. Francina died on 20 September 1915, and Thomas married his second wife, Josefina, in 1918. She died on 27 October 1927, and he married for a third time in 1933. He remained married to his third wife, Emma, until his death.

Thomas' business ventures continued through the 1920s and 1930s, leading to the purchase of a farm in 1933 over the border in the Union of South Africa. However, the sale was in violation of the Natives Land Act, leaving Mofolo to bear all the costs. This led to financial ruin. In 1941, he suffered a stroke from which he never fully recovered, and in 1948 he died in poverty, aged 71, in Teyateyaneng.

== Works ==
Mofolo published three books during his lifetime. His career as a writer, like much of his education, was shaped by the Paris Evangelical Missionary Society. His first two works were initially serialised in Leselinyana, a missionary newspaper, before they published them in book form. Mofolo's third, Chaka, was suppressed and publication was delayed by around 15 years due to the reluctance of the missionary press to release the work.

Mofolo also produced another manuscript, The Fallen Angel, in around 1908. This was met with disapproval from the missionaries, was never published, and is now lost. Little is known of it, other than a passing reference in a contemporary missionary account that notes it set out to disprove an unspecified theory of Marie Corelli.

His three published novels have all been translated into English and other languages, often with misconceptions and misunderstandings on the part of the translators.

=== Moeti oa bochabela ===
The first great modern African author is Thomas Mofolo of Basutoland. He is the first African author who takes account of the new age.

— Janheinz Jahn, 1961

Moeti oa bochabela is widely accepted as the first novel published in an African language. It was first serialised in Leselinyana beginning on 1 January 1907 before appearing as a book later that year. In 1934, an English-language translation, Traveller to the East, by Hugh Ashton (wrongly attributed as Harry Ashton in later editions) was published.

While now considered a pioneer African novel, it was conceived as an allegory or fable and often seen to borrow heavily from Bunyan's Pilgrim's Progress. More recently, the place of lithoko praise poems and the influence of other Sesotho writers whose work appeared in Leselinyana, such as Daniele Methusala, have been highlighted. Set in precolonial Lesotho, the English translation sees the protagonist, Fekisi, view society being overtaken by evil, with the only solution to turn towards Christianity. Elsewhere, it is seen as a merging of Sotho beliefs and Christian thoughts.

Moeti oa Bochabela and Pitseng are the precursors of the novel in Sotho literature, also preceding the novel form in other African languages in the subcontinent.

— Nhlanhla P. Maake, 1992

=== Pitseng ===
Like Moeti oa bochabela, Pitseng was also serialised in Leselinyana before appearing as a book in 1910. An English translation did not appear until 2013.

A novel about love and marriage, as well as the natural environment, Pitseng is set in a village in Lesotho at the beginning of the twentieth century. While vividly describing the natural world, the novel is a love story between a school teacher and a local girl. It has been interpreted as an indictment of the hypocrisy of European Christianity.

Chaka has been hailed as a masterpiece, yet also debated over as a "problem" text: an unsettled, unsettling, and possibly even dangerous mix of historical and ethnographic fact and literary invention.

— Jennifer Wenzel, 2021

=== Chaka ===
Thomas Mofolo achieved much wider reach with his third and final novel. By 1962 at least 40,000 of the Sesotho original had been printed, with translations appearing in English, French, German, Italian and Afrikaans. It was ranked among the top twelve of 'African's 100 Best Books on the Twentieth Century' in 2002.

Chaka is an historical novel that fictionalises the life of Shaka and the period of the difaqane. It has been widely studied and interpreted in various ways.

== Recognition ==
The library at the National University of Lesotho is named the Thomas Mofolo Library in his honour.

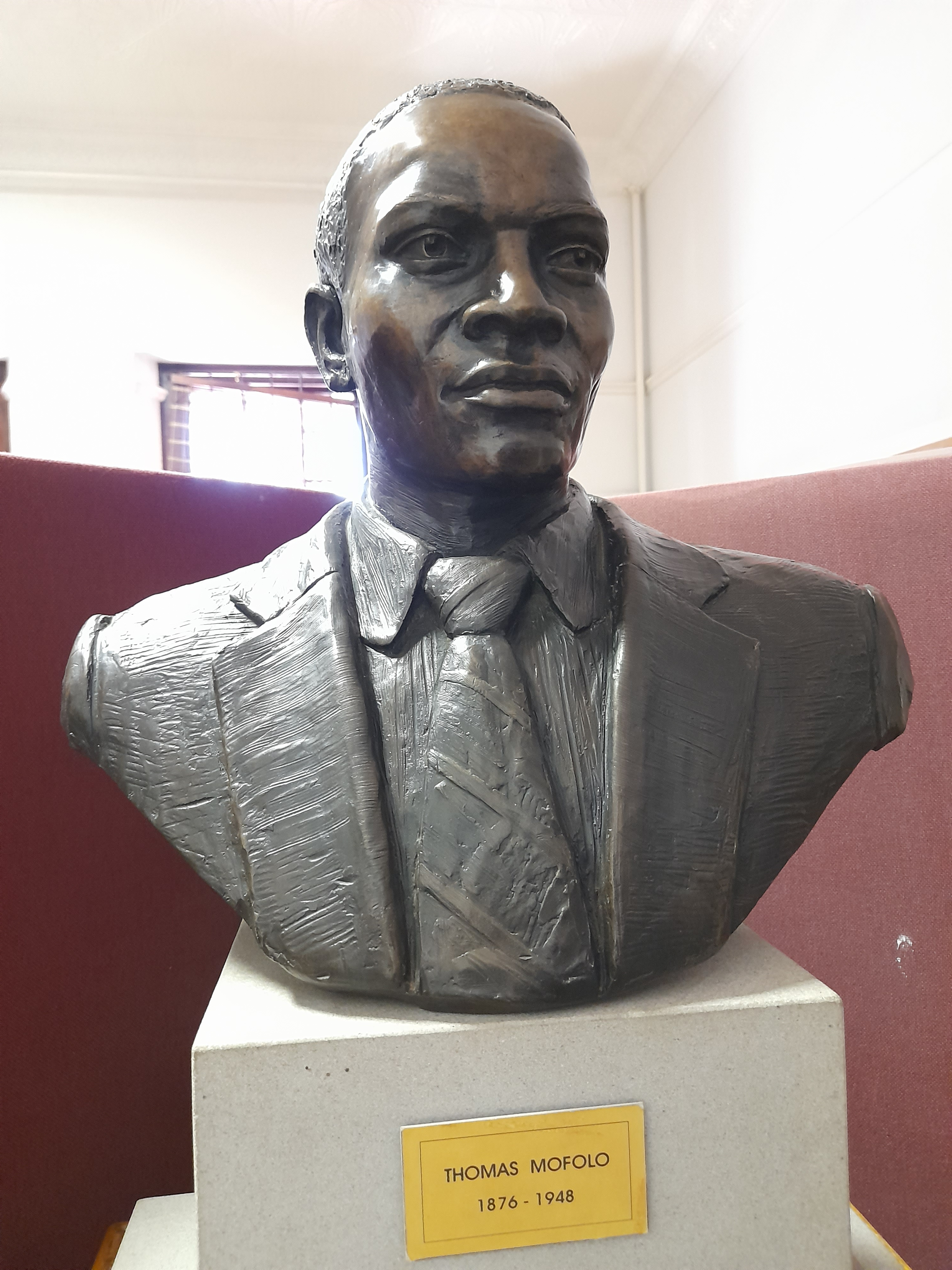
A bust of Thomas Mofolo at Sesotho Literary Museum,Bloemfontein

In 1976, Nadine Gordimer created the Mofolo-Plomer Prize in honour of Thomas Mofolo and William Plomer. More recently, the Thomas Mofolo Prize for Outstanding Sesotho Fiction was launched in 2019.

== Complete works ==
- Mofolo, Thomas (1907). Moeti oa Bochabela (in Southern Sotho). Morija: Sesuto Book Depot.
- —— (1910). Pitseng (in Southern Sotho). Morija: Sesuto Book Depot.
- —— (1925). Chaka (in Southern Sotho). Morija: Sesuto Book Depot.
- —— (1931). Chaka. An Historical Romance. Translated by Dutton, Frederick. London: Oxford University Press.
- —— (1934). Traveller to the East. Translated by Ashton, Hugh. London: Society for the Promotion of Christian Literature.
- —— (1981). Chaka. Translated by Kunene, Daniel. London: Heinemann.
- —— (2013). Pitseng: The Search for True Love. Translated by Kunene, Daniel. Morija: Morija Museum & Archives.
