= Lerotholi Polytechnic FC =

Lerotholi Polytechnic
- Full name: Lerotholi Polytechnic Football Club
- Founded: 1906
- Ground: Mohokare River ground, Maseru, Lesotho
- Capacity: 20,000
- League: Lesotho A-Division, Northern Stream
- 2013–14: Lesotho A-Division, Northern Stream, 6th

Lerotholi Polytechnic Football Club is a Lesotho football club based in Maseru. It takes its name from the tertiary institution in Maseru, Lerotholi polytechnic, which was founded by and named after Paramount Chief Lerotholi.

The team was relegated from the Lesotho Premier League at the end of the 2010–11 season and, as of 2014–15, has played in the A-Division since then.

== Achievements ==
- Lesotho Cup: 1

1996

== Performance in CAF competitions ==
- African Cup Winners' Cup: 1 appearance

1997 – First Round
