= Moshoeshoe =

Moshoeshoe may refer to:

- Moshoeshoe I (c. 1776-1870), paramount chief of southern Sotho; founder of Basuto kingdom (later Basutoland, then Lesotho)
- Moshoeshoe II of Lesotho (1938-1996), king of Lesotho

== See also ==
- Letsie I Moshoeshoe of Lesotho (1811-1891), paramount chief of Basotho (modern Lesotho) 1870-1891
- Moshoeshoe I International Airport, Lesotho
