= Corruption in Lesotho =

Corruption in Lesotho has always been a problem since when it was a British protectorate during its early days. However, the situation only became worse and more entrenched in the nation's political and economic systems around 1980s and 1990s. King Moshoeshoe II (1938-1996) presided over an era of pervasive corruption and nepotism, with allegations of misappropriation of state funds and awarding government contracts to friends. Nevertheless, by embracing multi-party democracy in the 1990’s, the nation managed to address some issues that existed before this time. Among those who are suspected of stealing money meant for developmental projects under Ntsu Mokhehle’s government (1993-1998), there were accusations of corruption related to his administration. At the same time, Prime Minister Pakalitha Mosisili’s term (1998-2012) is also remembered due to various serious corrupt practices such as bribery regarding the Lesotho Highlands Water Project being a contentious issue. Under Prime Minister Thomas Thabane (2017-2020), corruption has remained one of Lesotho's biggest challenges; hence his regime faced many cases involving misuse of funds including looting COVID-19 relief money which appropriately reflects this nature.

Lesotho’s Directorate on Corruption and Economic Offences (DCEO), its anti-corruption agency, is grappling with lack of resources, political interference and corruption within the agency itself hampering effective investigation and prosecution of corruption cases. Lesotho’s corruption situation is worsened by ineffective institutions and refusal to fight corruption, limited transparency and accountability in government as well as public institutions, lack of whistle blower protection mechanisms and public participation, widespread nepotism and patronage, restricted access to information as well as press freedom. The measures aimed at fighting against corruption in Lesotho include creation of DCEO plus an Anti-Corruption Tribunal, implementation of legislation relevant to anti-corruption policies, international support from bodies like the UN and African Development Bank (ADB), civil society movements including sensitization campaigns.

== History ==
=== Colonial era (1868-1966) ===
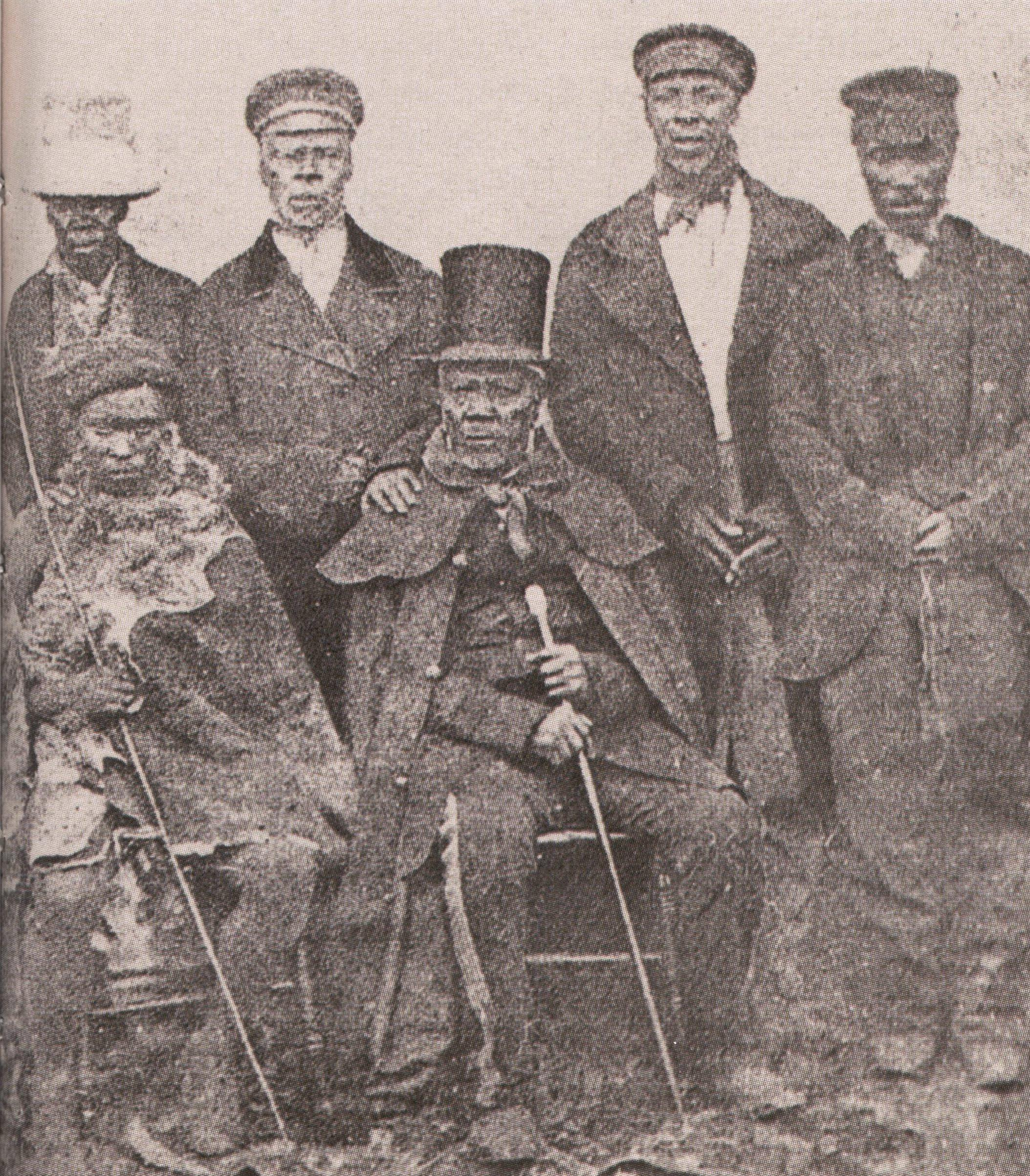
King Moshoeshoe of the Basotho with his ministers

Corruption during Lesotho's colonial times (1868-1966) was widespread and entrenched in the colonial administration. The British colonial authorities exploited Lesotho's resources and people, perpetuating corruption and abuse of power. Colonial officials embezzled funds meant for development projects, using them for personal gain. They seized land from Basotho people, often without compensation, and allocated it to colonial settlers and sympathizers.

Basotho men were forced to work in mines and on farms, often under harsh conditions and without fair pay. Colonial officials accepted bribes and favored friends and family in awarding contracts and jobs. The colonial administration perpetuated racial segregation and discrimination, denying Basotho people equal access to education, healthcare, and economic opportunities.

Colonial officials wielded significant power, often using it to exploit and intimidate the local population. They colluded with corrupt traditional leaders, who enriched themselves through illegal activities. This corruption and exploitation hindered Lesotho's economic and social development, perpetuating poverty and inequality. The legacy of colonial corruption continues to impact Lesotho today.

== Post-independence ==
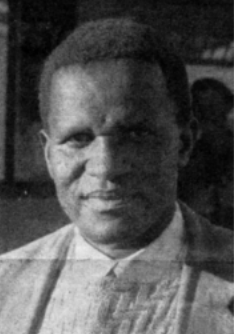
Ntsu Mokhehle, leader of the Basutoland Congress Party and prime minister of Lesotho

Since 1966 to present, corruption has been prevalent during post-independence Lesotho years. This has thwarted its progress and the governance pillars. Misuse of funds meant for various projects by administrators and politicians has been a common practice. They would then put the money into their own pockets rather than using it for what it was meant for. Leaders have also resorted to giving tendering process to their relatives or friends who lack the necessary qualifications just because they want to help them financially as well as employing them in public sector. Officials have been asking for bribes from entity businesses as well as from community members in order to facilitate faster processing of licenses and other legal documents that such people need so that they could be able to operate freely.

This has been an obstacle for economic growth in Lesotho, making the country lag behind in terms of equal opportunities in the development sector and deteriorating the already fragile confidence in the government and institutions. In the same breath, another far reaching effect has been that distorts justice, maintains endless want among her people and tarnishes her good global standing.

== International ranking ==
In Transparency International's 2025 Corruption Perceptions Index, Lesotho scored 37 on a scale from 0 ("highly corrupt") to 100 ("very clean"). When ranked by score, Lesotho ranked 99th among the 182 countries in the Index, where the country ranked first is perceived to have the most honest public sector. For comparison with regional scores, the best score among sub-Saharan African countries (Note: Angola, Benin, Botswana, Burkina Faso, Burundi, Cameroon, Cape Verde, Central African Republic, Chad, Comoros, Côte d'Ivoire, Democratic Republic of the Congo, Djibouti, Equatorial Guinea, Eritrea, Eswatini, Ethiopia, Gabon, Gambia, Ghana, Guinea, Guinea-Bissau, Kenya, Lesotho, Liberia, Madagascar, Malawi, Mali, Mauritania, Mauritius, Mozambique, Namibia, Niger, Nigeria, Republic of the Congo, Rwanda, Sao Tome and Principe, Senegal, Seychelles, Sierra Leone, Somalia, South Africa, South Sudan, Sudan, Tanzania, Togo, Uganda, Zambia, and Zimbabwe.) was 68, the average was 32 and the worst was 9. For comparison with worldwide scores, the best score was 89 (ranked 1), the average was 42, and the worst was 9 (ranked 181, in a two-way tie).

== See also ==
- Crime in Lesotho
- International Anti-Corruption Academy
- Group of States Against Corruption
- International Anti-Corruption Day
- United Nations Convention against Corruption
- OECD Anti-Bribery Convention
- Transparency International
