= Crime in Lesotho =

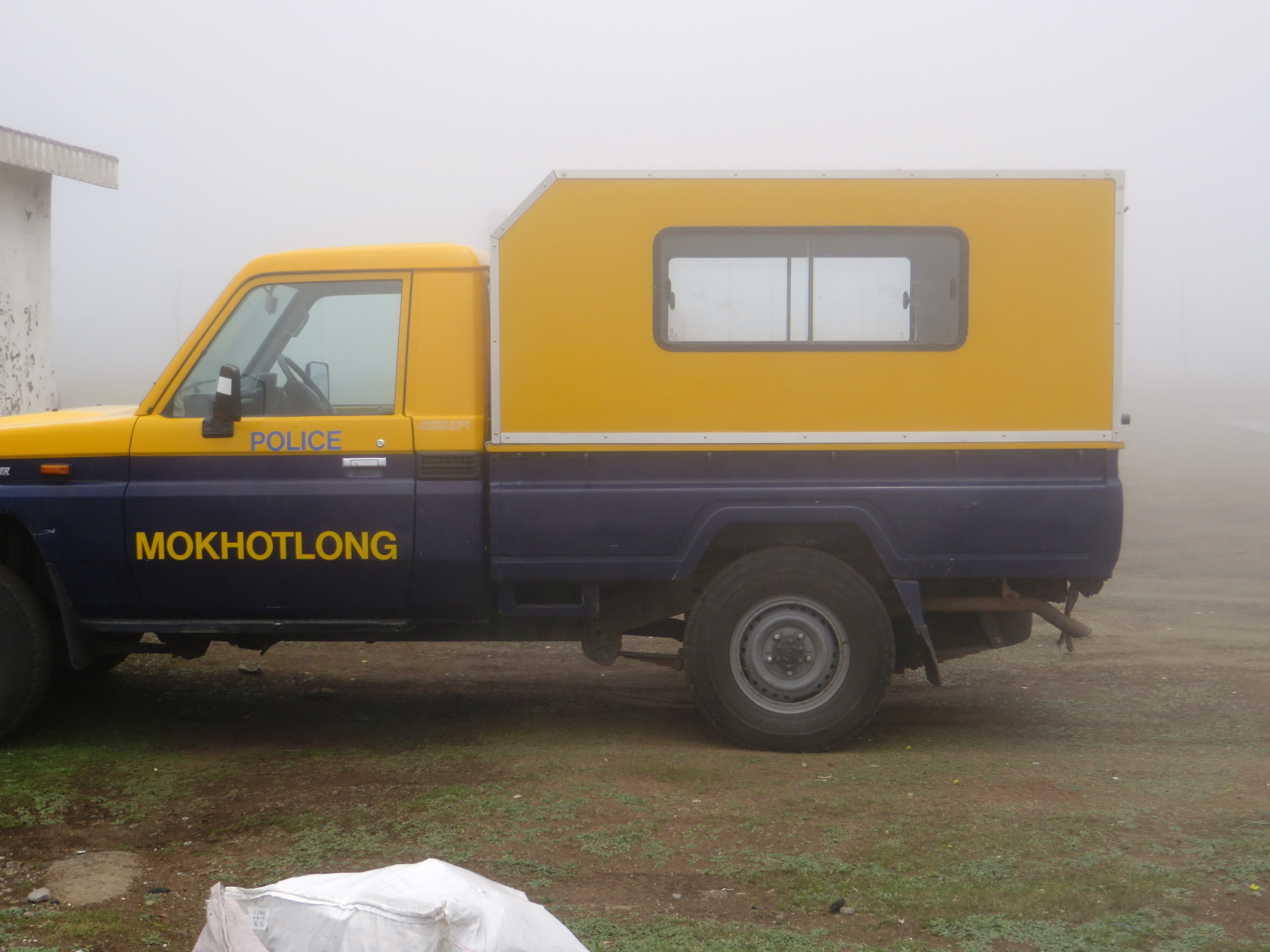
Lesotho Police car.

Crime in Lesotho features high rates of offenses, . Most incidents are opportunistic, although organized crime and corruption are present. Urban areas, particularly Maseru, experience the highest crime rates, five times greater than other districts. Leribe and Mafeteng also report elevated crime levels. The Lesotho Mounted Police Service serves as the national police force, addressing crime across the country.

== Types of crime ==
=== Opportunistic ===
Opportunistic crime is common, especially carjacking, home invasion, robbery, and sexual assault

=== Organized crime ===
Organized crime, often involving individuals from South Africa, focuses on human trafficking and vehicle theft.

==== Human trafficking ====
In 2010, Lesotho was a source and transit country for women and children subjected to trafficking, including forced labor and forced prostitution, and for men in forced labor. Within Lesotho, women and children faced involuntary domestic servitude, with children also experiencing commercial sexual exploitation to a lesser extent. Basotho victims were frequently trafficked to South Africa. Long-distance truck drivers, offering to transport women and girls seeking legitimate work in South Africa, sometimes raped them en route or forced them into prostitution. Many men migrating voluntarily to South Africa for illegal work in agriculture and mining became victims of labor trafficking. Women and children faced exploitation in domestic servitude and commercial sex in South Africa, with some girls subjected to forced marriages in remote villages. Informal traffickers, often acquiring victims from their families or neighbors, dominated internal and transnational trafficking. Chinese and reportedly Nigerian organized crime groups transported foreign victims through Lesotho to Johannesburg for local distribution or overseas transfer. Basotho children, especially orphans affected by HIV/AIDS, were particularly vulnerable to traffickers’ fraudulent job offers.

Lesotho’s laws, including the Child Protection Act of 1980, the Sexual Offenses Act of 2003, Common Law, and the Labor Code Order of 1981, prescribe penalties of at least five years’ imprisonment for trafficking-related crimes. The country ratified the 2000 UN TIP Protocol in September 2003. The Lesotho Mounted Police Service collaborates with South African police to investigate trafficking cases near borders. Immigration officers at the Maseru border post assisted approximately 20–30 labor trafficking victims, primarily men deported from South Africa.

In 2010, Lesotho lacked dedicated facilities for trafficking victims. Government- and NGO-supported orphanages provided some services to children presumed to be trafficking victims. The Child and Gender Protection Unit (CGPU) of the Lesotho Mounted Police Service offered counseling to women and children, including suspected trafficking victims. The government acknowledged the need for safe shelters in its draft anti-trafficking plan, but did not protect victims from prosecution for unlawful acts committed due to trafficking or provide foreign victims with legal alternatives to deportation to countries where they might face hardship. The U.S. State Department’s Office to Monitor and Combat Trafficking in Persons placed Lesotho in "Tier 2" in 2017 and 2023. In 2023, the Organised Crime Index noted involvement of local officials, as well as Pakistani and Chinese criminal gangs, in trafficking.

=== Corruption ===
Corruption in Lesotho has always been a problem since when it was a British protectorate during its early days. However, the situation only became worse and more entrenched in the nation's political and economic systems around 1980s and 1990s. King Moshoeshoe II (1938-1996) presided over an era of pervasive corruption and nepotism, with allegations of misappropriation of state funds and awarding government contracts to friends. Nevertheless, by embracing multi-party democracy in the 1990’s, the nation managed to address some issues that existed before this time. Among those who are suspected of stealing money meant for developmental projects under Ntsu Mokhehle’s government (1993-1998), there were accusations of corruption related to his administration. At the same time, Prime Minister Pakalitha Mosisili’s term (1998-2012) is also remembered due to various serious corrupt practices such as bribery regarding the Lesotho Highlands Water Project being a contentious issue. Under Prime Minister Thomas Thabane (2017-2020), corruption has remained one of Lesotho's biggest challenges; hence his regime faced many cases involving misuse of funds including looting COVID-19 relief money which appropriately reflects this nature.

Lesotho’s Directorate on Corruption and Economic Offences (DCEO), its anti-corruption agency, is grappling with lack of resources, political interference and corruption within the agency itself hampering effective investigation and prosecution of corruption cases. Lesotho’s corruption situation is worsened by ineffective institutions and refusal to fight corruption, limited transparency and accountability in government as well as public institutions, lack of whistle blower protection mechanisms and public participation, widespread nepotism and patronage, restricted access to information as well as press freedom. The measures aimed at fighting against corruption in Lesotho include creation of DCEO plus an Anti-Corruption Tribunal, implementation of legislation relevant to anti-corruption policies, international support from bodies like the UN and African Development Bank (ADB), civil society movements including sensitization campaigns.

== See also ==
- Human rights in Lesotho
- Child labour in Lesotho
