= Gabasheane Masupha =

Gabasheane Masupha (26 December 1903 - August 1949) was the Regent paramount chief of Lesotho (modern Basotho) from 1940 to 1941. Principal Chief of Ha-'Mamathe, Teya-teyaneng, Thupa-kubu and Jorotane. Died 1949; spouse 'Mamathe Masupha (nee. Nthati Justina Lebona). Issues 'Mankhabe Masupha (daughter), Mathe Masupha (daughter), Masupha Masupha (son), Koali Masupha (son), 'Mabatho Masupha (daughter), Sempe Masupha (son), Mitchell Masupha (son). Karabo Masupha(son)

Regnal titles
Preceded by Simon Seeiso Griffith	Paramount Chief of Basutoland; 1940–1941	Succeeded by 'Mantšebo Amelia 'Matšaba
