= Edward Garraway =

Sir Edward Charles Frederick Garraway, KCMG (10 March 1865 – 27 June 1932) was an Irish-born doctor and British colonial administrator who served as British Resident Commissioner in Bechuanaland and Basutoland.

== Life and career ==
Garraway was the eldest son of Colonel Charles Sutton Garraway, of Rockshire, Waterford. He was educated at Waterford Diocesan School and at the medical school of Trinity College, Dublin. He then qualified as a licentiate of the Royal College of Surgeons in Ireland, before being appointed assistant district surgeon at Millwood, Cape Colony, in 1888. He was appointed district surgeon at Kuruman, British Bechuanaland in 1891, and in 1892 he became surgeon to the Bechuanaland Border Police, with whom he participated in the First Matabele War in 1893. In 1895 he volunteered for the ill-fated Jameson Raid, and was taken prisoner, keeping a journal during his captivity. In 1901 he was transferred to the South African Constabulary as Divisional Medical Officer, with the rank of major, and in 1905 was promoted Principal Medical Officer.

In 1908 Garraway was appointed Military Secretary to Lord Selborne, High Commissioner for Southern Africa, though he never served in the regular army. He became a close friend of Lord Selborne, who appreciated his wit and his "Irishness". Garraway continued as Military Secretary when Lord Gladstone was appointed Governor-General of South Africa in 1910. He was especially adept at organising 'big hunts' for his superiors. In 1914 he was appointed special commissioner on the Southern Rhodesian Native Reserves Commission, representing the British government.

In 1916 he was appointed by Lord Buxton to be Resident Commissioner in the Bechuanaland Protectorate, and in 1917 he was appointed Resident Commissioner in Basutoland, additionally serving as Lieutenant-Colonel commanding Basutoland Mounted Police. He retired in 1926 and returned to Rockshire, where he died in 1932. A popular man, Garraway's obituary described him as "a charming, witty Irishman, who in all his travels never lost his delightful brogue".

Garraway received the British South Africa Company Medal (Matabeleland 1893 and Rhodesia 1896 clasp), the Queen's South Africa Medal with four clasps, and the King's South Africa Medal with two clasps. He was appointed a CMG in 1911 and advanced to KCMG in 1922.

== Family ==
Garraway married Winifred Mary Harvey, eldest daughter of J. H. Harvey, JP, of Blackbrook Grove, Fareham, Hampshire, in 1905; they had two daughters.
