= Constitution of Lesotho =

Basic law governing the African kingdom

The Constitution of Lesotho is the basic law governing the Kingdom of Lesotho. It provides the legal framework for the structure of the government and lays out the rights guaranteed to citizens. The Constitution was adopted in 1993. It aimed to distribute power among three branches of government, while preserving the power of the monarchy.

Since 1993, the Constitution has been amended five times.

== Contents ==
The Constitution consists of fifteen chapters containing 166 sections, and three schedules.

Chapter 1: The Kingdom and its Constitution

Chapter 1 outlines the Kingdom and its Constitution. First, it establishes Lesotho as a sovereign democratic kingdom and lays out the Kingdom's territory. Section 2 establishes the Constitution as the supreme law of Lesotho. The chapter also specifies that the official languages of Lesotho are Sesotho and English.

Chapter 2: Protection of Fundamental Human Rights and Freedoms

Chapter 2 guarantees certain rights and freedoms to citizens, serving as a bill of rights. Citizens are guaranteed the right to life, personal liberty, and equality before the law. Additionally, the Constitution ensures freedom from inhuman treatment, slavery, arbitrary search, seizure of property, and discrimination. Also, citizens are guaranteed freedom of movement, speech, association, and conscious.

This section specifies that these guarantees are entitled to every person in Lesotho regardless of race, sex, language, religion, political opinion, nationality, and property holdings.

Chapter 3: Principles of State Policy

Chapter 3 outlines the principles of state policy. First the Constitution promises that Lesotho would adopt policies aimed at promoting equality and justice. The section furthers that the state must take “appropriate measures in order to promote equality for disadvantaged groups.” These commitments extend to protections of health, education, work opportunity, labor conditions, and the rights of victims. Finally, the section promises to protect children, the disabled, marginalized cultural groups, and even the environment.

Chapter 4: Citizenship

Chapter 4 describes how citizenship works in Lesotho. The section leads with assuring all existing citizens under the Lesotho Citizenship Order 1971 that they maintain their citizenship under the new Constitution. Citizenship is extended to anyone born in Lesotho after the adoption of the Constitution, children and spouses of those born in Lesotho, and citizens who previously renounced their citizenship because of a marriage. The Parliament can create provisions that allow for the citizenship of those who do not satisfy the aforementioned conditions.

Chapter 5: The King

Chapter 5 outlines the office and duties of the King. The chapter establishes the King of Lesotho as a constitutional monarch and the head of state. They also clarify that the King is still bound by the limits of the Constitution. The College of Chiefs is tasked with managing succession and replacing monarchs after they pass away. This responsibility extends to selecting a King-regent. Finally, the King and regent are granted immunity from taxation.

Chapter 6: The Parliament

Chapter 6 outlines the structure and duties of the Parliament. The Parliament is composed of the King, a Senate, and a National Assembly. Members to the Senate are nominated by the King, whereas the National Assembly is popularly elected through a mixed-member proportional system. Members of Parliament must be citizens of Lesotho and speak either English or Sesotho. This chapter also establishes positions such as the President and Vice President of the Senate and Deputy Speaker of the National Assembly. Finally, it established an independent electoral commission to protect the fairness of elections.

Chapter 7: Alteration of Constitution

Chapter 7 explains the process by which the Constitution can be amended. This ability is reserved for Parliament which can submit bills to the King recommending changes.

Chapter 8: The Executive

Chapter 8 outlines the executive authority of Lesotho. The chief executive is the King, but they are still subject to provisions of the Constitution and Parliament. The King must appoint a Prime Minister. This selection should be the leader of the dominant party in the House of Assembly. This chapter also establishes a Cabinet of Ministers that serves to advise the King and lead Parliament. The chapter also establishes a Council of State to further assist the King. Further sections create principal secretaries, a government secretary, attorney general, Director of public prosecutions, the college of Chiefs, and a National Advisory Planning Board.

Chapter 9: Land

Chapter 9 explains the process of land allocation in the new democratic kingdom. The power to allocate land is reserved to the King, but Parliament may make provisions regulating the process.

Chapter 10: Finance

Chapter 10 describes how the financial system will work in Lesotho. All revenues collected by the government go towards a Consolidated Fund. This fund can only be drawn from if Parliament agrees on a spending bill. There is an exception when Parliament must make contingency funds for times of emergency.

Chapter 11: The Judicature

Chapter 11 outlines the structure and duties of the judiciary. This chapter establishes a Court of Appeal, High Court, Subordinate Courts, and Parliamentary tribunals. The High Court has unlimited jurisdiction to decide what cases they can hear. Its justices are selected by Parliament and there will be a Chief Justice. All High Court judges are tenured and may only be removed if poor conduct is proven.

Chapter 11A: Human Rights Commission

Chapter 11A establishes an independent Human Rights Commission that serves to monitor human rights in Lesotho. This commission will produce an annual report and present it to Parliament for reform.

Chapter 12: The Ombudsman

Chapter 12 establishes an ombudsman that has the authority to investigate complaints against the government. They can investigate government officers and institutions. The ombudsman is subject to limitations that may be prescribed by Parliament.

Chapter 13: The Public Service

Chapter 13 outlines the public service. It first establishes a Public Service Commission that oversees organizing and overseeing the public service. They have the responsibility of appointing and firing public officers. This chapter outlines the structures of the police, Courts-Martial Appeal Court, National Security Service, Correctional Service, Teaching Service, and Defense Force.

Chapter 14: Miscellaneous

Chapter 14 addresses miscellaneous facets of Lesotho's government that previous sections do not consider. Public officers may resign when they please and be reappointed if qualified. This chapter also clarifies some potential interpretation issues with the wording of the document.

Chapter 15: Transitional and Temporary Provisions

Chapter 15 explains how preexisting laws will continue to be in effect following the adoption of the new Constitution. This same logic applies to the King and Prime Minister who will maintain their office. All other offices and positions created by the Constitution will be established immediately upon adoption.

Implications

Many scholars consider Lesotho's Constitution as a response to South African apartheid. They perceive the assurances of a free, equitable, just society as subtle jabs at their exclave. Despite the ombudsman, bill of rights, and human rights commission, Lesotho is dominated by patriarchal norms. While the Constitution was written in 1993, it borrowed greatly from the Constitution of the Basutolands that predated the country's independence. The Constitution intended to establish strong national and cultural ideologies to differentiate Lesotho from South Africa, but scholars question its effectiveness.

=== References ===
Coplan, David B.; Quinlan, Tim (1997). "A Chief by the People: Nation versus State in Lesotho". Africa: Journal of the International African Institute. 67 (1): 27–60. doi:10.2307/1161269 ISSN 0001-9720.

Proctor, J.H. (1969). "Building a constitutional monarchy in Lesotho / FORMATION D'UNE MONARCHIE CONSTITUTIONNELLE AU LESOTHO". Civilisations. 19 (1): 64–86. ISSN 0009-8140.

Weisfelder, Richard F. (1976). "The Decline of Human Rights in Lesotho: An Evaluation of Domestic and External Determinants". Issue: A Journal of Opinion. 6 (4): 22–33. doi:10.2307/1166558 ISSN 0047-1607. Lemon, Anthony (1996). "Lesotho and the New South Africa: The Question of Incorporation". The Geographical Journal. 162 (3): 263–272. doi:10.2307/3059649 ISSN 0016-7398.

Cobbe, James (1991). "Lesotho: What Will Happen after Apartheid Goes?". Africa Today. 38 (1): 18–32. ISSN 0001-9887.

Weisfelder, Richard F. (1992). "Lesotho and the Inner Periphery in the New South Africa". The Journal of Modern African Studies. 30 (4): 643–668. ISSN 0022-278X.

WILLIAMS, CHRISTOPHER (2019). "LESOTHO IN 2019: LOOKING BACK TO FIND A WAY FORWARD".

Love, Roy (1996). "Lesotho: Inner to Outer Periphery?". Review of African Political Economy. 23 (67): 75–80. ISSN 0305-6244.

Gordon, Elizabeth Boltson (1994). "The Plight of the Women of Lesotho: Reconsideration with the Decline of Apartheid?". Journal of Black Studies. 24 (4): 435–446. ISSN 0021-9347.

Turkon, David (2008). "Commoners, Kings, and Subaltern: Political Factionalism and Structured Inequality in Lesotho". Political and Legal Anthropology Review. 31 (2): 203–223. ISSN 1081-6976.

Poulter, Sebastian. “The Place of the Laws of Lerotholi in the Legal System of Lesotho.” African Affairs, vol. 71, no. 283, 1972, pp. 144–62, JSTOR 720875. Accessed 9 May 2022.
