= Seforong =

- Community Council
- Geographic Center of Community
- Coordinates: 30°06′10″S 28°11′11″E
- Country: Lesotho
- District: Quthing District
- Elevation: 6,713 ft (2,046 m)

Population (2006)
  - Total: 9,720
- Time zone: UTC+2 (CAT)
- Coordinates computed from Lesotho Villages file.

Seforong is a community council located in the Quthing District of Lesotho. Its population in 2006 was 9,720.

== Villages ==
The community of Seforong includes the villages of Aupolasi, Bethane, Ha 'Malitlhare, Ha 'Mampiletso, Ha 'Ngoae, Ha Filane, Ha Kokoropo, Ha Leihloana, Ha Lesholu, Ha Mabusetsa, Ha Maime, Ha Maisa, Ha Mankata, Ha Mankata (Khohlong), Ha Mankata (Thabana-Tšooana), Ha Mapuleng, Ha Masupha, Ha Monese, Ha Monoto, Ha Mosi, Ha Motebang, Ha Motiki, Ha Motseleli, Ha Motšoane, Ha Nkati, Ha Polaki, Ha Potso, Ha Ramoroba, Ha Ramotloang, Ha Ranyathelaha, Ha Ratšitso, Ha Sekilane, Ha Sekoati, Ha Sello, Ha Selonyane, Ha Seqotomela, Ha Shao, Ha Teleka, Ha Tibisi, Ha Tšita, Ha Welephi (Sekoaing), Kamora Thaba, Lehonyeling, Letlapeng, Letsoapong, Lichecheng, Liphafeng, Litšoeneng, Mabeleteng, Makhetheng, Malosong, Maqomeng, Meeling, Motse-Mocha, Phocha, Pontšeng, Porotong, Sehlabaneng, Sekoaing, Sekokoaneng, Swatsi, Tafoleng (Ha Leihloana), Thaba-Chitja, Thaba-Chitja (Liphookoaneng), Thaba-Chitja (Mpharane), Thabang (Ha Leihloana), Thobai and Toalaneng (Toalaneng).
