= Seeiso of Basutoland =

Seeiso

Paramount Chief of Basutoland
- Reign: 23 June 1939 – 26 December 1940
- Predecessor: Nathaniel Griffith Lerotholi
- Successor: Gabasheane Masupha (as regent)
- Born: 1905
- Died: 26 December 1940 (aged 34–35)
- Issue: Moshoeshoe II
- House: House of Moshoeshoe

Seeiso, full name Simon Seeiso Griffith (1905 – 26 December 1940) was the paramount chief of Basutoland from 23 June 1939 until his death. He was the father of King Moshoeshoe II of Lesotho and the paternal grandfather of king Letsie III of Lesotho.

Regnal titles
Preceded by Nathaniel Griffith Lerotholi	Paramount Chief of Basutoland; 1939–1940	Succeeded by Gabasheane Masupha
