= Nkoebe =

Ha Nkoebe
- Community Council
- Geographic Center of Community
- Coordinates: 30°22′08″S 27°49′03″E
- Country: Lesotho
- District: Quthing District
- Elevation: 5,505 ft (1,678 m)

Population (2006)
  - Total: 10,487
- Time zone: UTC+2 (CAT)
- Coordinates computed from Lesotho Villages file.

Ha Nkoebe is a community council located in the Quthing District of Lesotho. Its population in 2006 was 10,487.

== Villages ==
The community of Ha Nkoebe includes the villages of Bolahla (Ha Makama), Bolahla (Ha Mphallo), Bolahla (Ha Sejakhosi), Bolahla (Kepeng), Bolahla (Livovong), Bolahla (Masuoaneng), Bolahla (Seteketeng), Buya-Vuthe, Ha Boke, Ha Boloumane, Ha Hlalele, Ha Kabi, Ha Kaloli (Fokomo), Ha Kaloli (Lebangong), Ha Kaloli (Likolobeng), Ha Kaloli (Location), Ha Kotane, Ha Lebona, Ha Machotoane, Ha Malephane, Ha Masunyane, Ha Moseneke, Ha Moseneke (Kanana), Ha Mosifa, Ha Motsapi, Ha Mphakela, Ha Mphasane, Ha Nyolo, Ha Piti (Likhohlong), Ha Potomane, Ha Qhotsi, Ha Rakhomo, Ha Raphoto (Ha Malephane), Ha Robi, Ha Sehloho (Lithabaneng), Ha Selebalo, Ha Sempe, Ha Soetsane, Ha Tafita, Ha Tamanyane, Lekhalong (Ha Leeto), Lekhalong (Ha Mangana), Letlapeng, Lichecheng (Ha Malephane), Likolobeng (Letlapeng), Likolobeng (Peling), Litseng (Ha Kabi), Makatseng (Phuthalichaba), Makatseng (Sekolong), Makatseng (Seqhobong), Maokeng, Mapeleng (Ha Malephane), Maphapheng, Matebeleng, Mokhoabong, Photha-Photha, Pontšeng, Sebapala, Sebapala (Aupolasi), Sebapala (Borokhong), Sebapala (Moreneng), Sekhutlong and Teraeng.
