= Herbert Sloley =

British colonial administrator

Sir Herbert Cecil Sloley, KCMG (4 February 1855 – 22 September 1937) was a British colonial policeman and administrator. He was Resident Commissioner for Basutoland from circa 1900 to 1916.

== Early life ==
Sloley was born in Calcutta, to Robert Hugh Sloley and Marian Farrell. He was educated at Greenwich Propriety School. After school, he had a brief career in banking at the London and Westminster Bank in 1873.

== Career ==
Sloley arrived in South Africa in 1877, joining the Cape Mounted Riflemen. During the Basuto Gun War, between 1880 and 1881, he was appointed as a Captain commanding a native contingent. In 1883, he transferred to the Cape police as a Sub-Inspector which he held until 1884 and then the same role with Basutoland Mounted Police until 1886. He held a position with the latter as inspector from 1886 until 1889. Sloley was appointed assistant commissioner to Basutoland in 1889. By 1898 he was its Government Secretary and the Resident Commissioner in 1901 which he held until 1916. In 1908, he established a National Council of Basutos.

== Marriage ==
Sloley married Charlotte Dick in 1886 in the Cape Colony.

== Death ==
Retiring in 1916, he died in Cape Town in 1937.

== Honours ==
Sloley was made a Companion of the Order of St Michael and St George in 1905. In 1911 he was appointed Knight Commander to the latter order.
