= Tsatsane =

- Community Council
- Geographic Center of Community
- Coordinates: 30°26′45″S 27°59′09″E
- Country: Lesotho
- District: Quthing District
- Elevation: 5,390 ft (1,643 m)

Population (2006)
  - Total: 9,452
- Time zone: UTC+2 (CAT)
- Coordinates computed from Lesotho Villages file.

Tsatsane is a community council located in the Quthing District of Lesotho. Its population in 2006 was 9,452.

== Villages ==
The community of Tsatsane includes the villages of Ha 'MaKo (Tosing), Ha Choko, Ha Falatsa, Ha France, Ha Hlaela, Ha Hlanyane, Ha Lephahamela, Ha Liphapang, Ha Mafura (Ha Maphasa), Ha Mafura (Ha Moso), Ha Mafura (Khorong), Ha Mafura (Mokhatseng), Ha Mafura (Moreneng), Ha Mafura (Sekhitsaneng), Ha Mafura (Tereseng), Ha Maleka, Ha Malibeng, Ha Mateisi, Ha Mathe, Ha Matiase, Ha Mofokeng, Ha Mongoli, Ha Montši, Ha Mosele, Ha Motsumi, Ha Mpapa, Ha Phoofo (Dalewe), Ha Raemile, Ha Ralebona (Dalewe), Ha Ramanasi, Ha Ranthoto, Ha Sekhobe, Ha Sekonyela, Ha Seliba, Ha Thaha, Ha Thibella, Koti-se-phola, Kueneng, Lahla-Nkobo, Lihlabeng (Ha Jobo), Lipeleng (Dalewe), Litšoeneng, Litšoeneng (Tosing), Mabele-a-tlala, Mahlanyeng, Mapeleng, Maqebeng, Masoothong, Matebeleng, Mateleng (Tosing), Matšela-habeli (Tiping), Mokema, Mokhoabong, Morataleng, Nonyana-e'a-mpitsa, Sekoaing, Selomong (Aupolasi), Seoling, Teraeng (Dalewe), Thaba-Ntšo, Tlokoeng and Tsekong.
