= Matsatseng =

- Community Council
- Geographic Center of Community
- Coordinates: 30°25′26″S 27°40′01″E
- Country: Lesotho
- District: Quthing District
- Elevation: 5,915 ft (1,803 m)

Population (2006)
  - Total: 18,713
- Time zone: UTC+2 (CAT)
- Coordinates computed from Lesotho Villages file.

Matsatseng is a community council located in the Quthing District of Lesotho. Its population in 2006 was 18,713.

== Villages ==
The community of Matsatseng includes the villages of:

- Alwynskop
- Ben Hoek
- Bolepeletsa
- Chaenese
- Dikeng
- Fola
- Folising
- Ha Caswell
- Ha George
- Ha Hlalele
- Ha Khakhau
- Ha Kose
- Ha Lekete
- Ha Lekhoba
- Ha Liqa
- Ha Lira
- Ha Mahlelehlele
- Ha Makoloane
- Ha Mathabathe
- Ha Meea
- Ha Mochaso
- Ha Moshati
- Ha Mosuoe
- Ha Mosuoe (Aupolasi)
- Ha Mosuoe (Ha Maruping)
- Ha Mosuoe (Ha Rankotoko)
- Ha Mosuoe (Mangopeng)
- Ha Taoa
- Ha Tapole
- Ha Teisi
- Ha Tlhohothelo
- Ha Zakia
- Hombani
- Katlehong
- Khatseng
- Khutsong
- Kobolong
- Kotisephola
- Letsatseng (Ha Ntami)
- Lexene (Mjanyane)
- Lihekaneng
- Linotšing
- Litorofeeng
- Maaoeng
- Mabitseng
- Mahaheng
- Majakaneng
- Makepeng
- Manganeng
- Marabeng
- Marakong
- Masakaneng
- Masitise (Motse-Mocha)
- Masitise High School
- Matebeleng
- Matsatseng
- Mdene (Mjanyane)
- Mjanyane
- Mkholu (Ntozimnande)
- Moreneng
- Mototoane
- Ndongwane
- Ngomozabantu
- Nkomandene
- Nontokwene
- Ntozimnande
- Ntozimnande (Sgwetja)
- Nxobolong
- Nxowa (Ntozimnande)
- Paballong
- Peling
- Phuleng
- Phuthing
- Seaka
- Sekoting
- Setakeng
- Setanteng
- Sizindene
- Sizindene (Mjanyane)
- Takisa
- Terateng
- Thaba-Kholo
- Thaba-Tšoeu (Mjanyane)
- Thajaneng
- Thoteng
- Tipane
- Tjotjong (Ntozimnande)
- Tlhakoaneng
- Tsekong
- Tšethe
- Tšoeneng and Waterfall
