= Liphakoe =

- Community Council
- Geographic Center of Community
- Coordinates: 30°23′43″S 27°42′25″E
- Country: Lesotho
- District: Quthing District
- Elevation: 4,787 ft (1,459 m)

Population (2006)
  - Total: 14,537
- Time zone: UTC+2 (CAT)
- Coordinates computed from Lesotho Villages file.

Liphakoe is a community council located in the Quthing District of Lesotho. Its population in 2006 was 14,537.

== Villages ==
The community of Liphakoe includes the villages of Borokhong, Duba-Duba, Ha Felix, Ha Lehlabela, Ha Lekhotso, Ha Lephutha, Ha Letsika, Ha Mahlaba, Ha Makepile, Ha Makoqoko, Ha Marase, Ha Mathabela, Ha Mathabeng (Thoteng), Ha Mofetoli, Ha Mokola, Ha Ntho, Ha Rakhoboli, Ha Ramohanoe, Ha Rashoalane, Ha Ratema, Ha Sephamo, Ha Sikara, Hekeng, K'hok'hobe, Koung, Lekhalong, Lekhotleng, Leloaleng, Lipeleng, Lower Moyeni, Maboelleng, Makanese, Mampoboleng, Mohloling, Mokanametsong, Motse-mocha, Motse-mocha (Ha Sikara), Police Line, Sekantšing, Thaba-Chitja, Thabaneng, Thabong, Thoteng, Upper Moyeni and Welkom.
