= Likhohlong =

- Community Council
- Geographic Center of Community
- Coordinates: 30°32′50″S 27°44′40″E
- Country: Lesotho
- District: Quthing District
- Elevation: 6,227 ft (1,898 m)

Population (2006)
  - Total: 7,455
- Time zone: UTC+2 (CAT)
- Coordinates computed from Lesotho Villages file.

Likhohlong is a community council located in the Quthing District of Lesotho. Its population in 2006 was 7,455.

== Villages ==
The community of Likhohlong includes the villages of:

- Danger's Hoek
- Diphani
- Ha Khoro
- Ha Machakela
- Ha Makhalanyane
- Ha Motsapi
- Ha Mpeka
- Ha Mphojoa
- Ha Nkoto
- Ha Sekhobe
- Ha Selebalo

- Ha Shemane
- Ha Tšoene
- Khokhobeni
- Khubetsoana
- Langeni
- Lekhalong
- Lelibohong (Thotaneng)
- Lichecheng
- Mafikeng
- Mankoaneng
- Marakabei

- Marakong (Ha Qoi)
- Mathole (Dekeni)
- Meriting
- Mokapeleng
- Mokhethoana
- Motheaneng
- Motse-Mocha
- Motsekuoa
- Nkoeng
- Nkotjene
- Nomfuthoane

- Pakeletso
- Patisi
- Phuthing
- Royvaal
- Sandlulube
- Sethepung
- Silase
- Stationeng
- Thabong
- Tlhakoaneng
- Waterfall
