= Mokotjomela =

- Community Council
- Geographic Center of Community
- Coordinates: 30°17′06″S 27°57′43″E
- Country: Lesotho
- District: Quthing District
- Elevation: 5,768 ft (1,758 m)

Population (2006)
  - Total: 12,340
- Time zone: UTC+2 (CAT)
- Coordinates computed from Lesotho Villages file.

Mokotjomela is a community council located in the Quthing District of Lesotho. Its population in 2006 was 12,340.

== Villages ==
The community of Mokotjomela includes the villages of:

- Aupolasi
- Ha Buru
- Ha Chere
- Ha Khatoane
- Ha Koali
- Ha Leroma
- Ha Lerotholi
- Ha Lethinya
- Ha Mabala
- Ha Malibe
- Ha Mathatjane
- Ha Mofula
- Ha Mohlakaso
- Ha Mohlori
- Ha Mokae
- Ha Mokokoane
- Ha Moleleki
- Ha Moone
- Ha Moqalo
- Ha Mpheelle
- Ha Mphethi
- Ha Muso
- Ha Ntemere
- Ha Ponto
- Ha Seja-Meloli
- Ha Sekhele
- Ha Sekhonyana
- Ha Tebesi
- Khohlong (Ha Koali)
- Lefikeng
- Lekhalong
- Lipeleng
- Liphakoeng
- Majakaneng
- Makong (Lefikeng)
- Makoreng
- Makorong
- Maloikomong
- Malothoaneng
- Mangoseng
- Mantsoepa
- Mapekeng
- Mapekeng (Mabankoleng)
- Mapekeng (Phokeng)
- Mapekeng (Tšieng)
- Maputsoe
- Maqoathong
- Marakong
- Maralleng
- Matsitsing
- Matsoapong
- Meeling
- Meeling (Lefikeng)
- Mehlehleng
- Mokotjomela
- Mothating
- Naleli (Lefikeng)
- Nqanqasing
- Phahameng
- Phuthing
- Polasing
- Polateng
- Sekhutlong
- Sekolong
- Seleng
- Sephokong
- Thang Block
- Thepung
- Tholong
- Thoteng
- Tiping
- Tlhakoaneng
- Tlokoeng
- Tsekong
- Tsoelike
