= Mkh'Ono =

Mk'hono
- Community Council
- Geographic Center of Community
- Coordinates: 30°09′40″S 27°59′25″E
- Country: Lesotho
- District: Quthing District
- Elevation: 8,025 ft (2,446 m)

Population (2006)
  - Total: 9,840
- Time zone: UTC+2 (CAT)
- Coordinates computed from Lesotho Villages file.

Mk'hono is a community council located in the Quthing District of Lesotho. Its population in 2006 was 9,840.

== Villages ==
The community of Mk'hono includes the villages of:

- Bolula
- Boshoa-poho
- Chache
- Ha Bolomo
- Ha Boroko
- Ha Jobo (Moreneng)
- Ha Kholoa
- Ha Kopolane
- Ha Lebelonyane
- Ha Lebelonyane (Sekiring)
- Ha Lebesele
- Ha Lekhoele
- Ha Mabina
- Ha Machakela
- Ha Mahatanya
- Ha Majara
- Ha Makhoali
- Ha Mapena
- Ha Mashapha
- Ha Matlali
- Ha Mofomme
- Ha Mohale
- Ha Mohlakoana
- Ha Monoana
- Ha Morai
- Ha Mothamane
- Ha Mphori
- Ha Nonyana
- Ha Ramollo
- Ha Rasebotsa
- Ha Raseeng
- Ha Rasofia
- Ha Ratema
- Ha Sekhaola
- Ha Sekoati
- Ha Selatile
- Ha Sello
- Ha Setoi
- Ha Sheleri
- Ha Tanyele
- Ha Tobia
- Ha Tsoinyane
- Khohlong
- Khubetsoana
- Koung
- Kueneng (Ha Halahala)
- Lekhalaneng
- Letlapeng
- Letsatseng
- Lichecheng
- Likhokhotsing
- Likonyeleng
- Lilepeng
- Lintlheng
- Lithakong
- Litsineng
- Litšoeneng
- Macheseng
- Maebaneng
- Makaoteng
- Makatseng
- Manyalasing
- Maphakatlaling
- Mapheaneng
- Mapolaneng
- Matamong
- Matebeleng
- Metsi-Masooana
- Moeaneng
- Mokekeng
- Mosafeleng
- Nicefield
- Ntšoasolle
- Peka
- Phuleng
- Phuthing
- Polateng
- Qheeba
- Sekokoaneng
- Taung
- Thaba-Chitja
- Thabana-Mofoli
- Thepung
- Tiping
- Tolong and Tsekong
