= Qomoqomong =

- Community Council
- Geographic Center of Community
- Coordinates: 30°27′16″S 27°48′34″E
- Country: Lesotho
- District: Quthing District
- Elevation: 5,335 ft (1,626 m)

Population (2006)
  - Total: 6,760
- Time zone: UTC+2 (CAT)
- Coordinates computed from Lesotho Villages file.

Qomoqomong is a community council located in the Quthing District of Lesotho. Its population in 2006 was 6,760.

== Villages ==
The community of Qomoqomong includes the villages of Basieng, Basieng (Khoaba-la-eja-Papa), Basieng (Mafikeng), Basieng (Phuthalichaba), Ha Bulara (Qomoqomong), Ha Elia, Ha Kompi, Ha Lephutha (Qomoqomong), Ha Liphophi, Ha Litau, Ha Malaela, Ha Mochotoane, Ha Mojakhomo, Ha Mokhameleli (Qomoqomong), Ha Molebaliso, Ha Moorosi, Ha Moshe, Ha Phera, Ha Ramosoeu (Qomoqomong), Ha Ratšiu (Qomoqomong), Ha Setoko, Ha Setoko (Khohlong), Ha Tameisi, Ha Tsikane, Khohlong (Ha Molebaliso), Lebenkeleng (Qomoqomong), Liqala, Mabuleng, Maheising, Makhetheng, Maphepheng, Matebeleng, Moorosi Flats, Phuthing, Sekhutlong (Ha Phoka), Sekolong (Qomoqomong), Thoteng and Thoteng (Qomoqomong).
