= Nathaniel Griffith Lerotholi =

Lesotho chief (1870–1939)

Nathaniel Griffith Lerotholi CBE (1870 – 23 June 1939) was the paramount chief of Basutoland from 11 April 1913 when he succeeded his brother Letsie II until his death in 1939. He was succeeded by his son Simon Seeiso Griffith.

Regnal titles
Preceded by Letsie II	Paramount Chief of Basutoland; 1913–1939	Succeeded by Seeiso
