= Monarchy of Lesotho =

King of Lesotho
- Morena a Lesotho
- Coat of arms of Lesotho

Incumbent
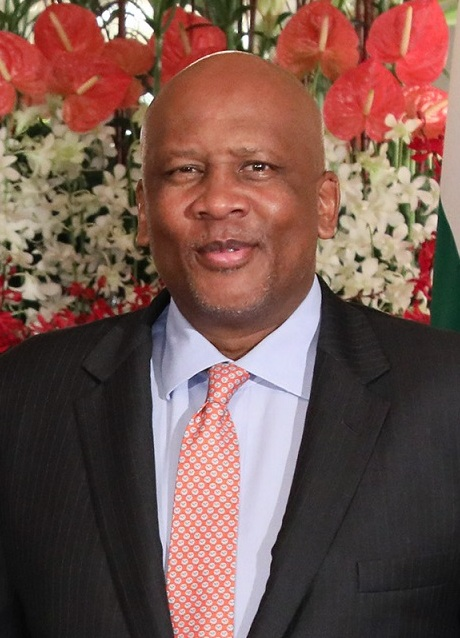
- Letsie III since 7 February 1996

Details
- Style: His Majesty
- Heir apparent: Lerotholi Seeiso
- First monarch: Moshoeshoe I (as paramount chief)
- Formed: 1822; 204 years ago
- Residences: Royal Palace, Maseru
- Website: Website

The monarchy of Lesotho is the form of government used by Lesotho (formerly known as Basutoland until 1966) by which a hereditary monarch reigns as the head of state, with their powers regulated by the Constitution. The monarch is styled as Marena; in Sotho language, Marena is the plural of the common noun Kings, where Morena is the singular for King.

The monarch since 7 February 1996 is King Letsie III, who ascended the throne on the death of King Moshoeshoe II, his father. It is the second reign of Letsie III; his first reign lasted from 12 November 1990 to 25 January 1995.

== Succession ==
The succession to the throne of Lesotho is laid down in Chapter V of the Constitution, which reads that:

(1) The College of Chiefs may at any time designate, in accordance with the customary law of Lesotho, the person (or the persons, in order of prior right) who are entitled to succeed to the office of King upon the death of the holder of, or the occurrence of any vacancy in, that office and if on such death or vacancy, there is a person who has previously been designated in pursuance of this section and who is capable under the customary law of Lesotho of succeeding to that office, that person (or, if there is more than one such person, that one of them who has been designated as having the first right to succeed to the office) shall become King.

(2) If, on the death of the holder of, or the occurrence of any vacancy in, the office of King, there is no person who becomes King under subsection (1), the College of Chiefs shall, with all practical speed and in accordance with the customary law of Lesotho, proceed to designate a person to succeed to the office of King and the person so designated shall thereupon become King.

== Compensation ==
The king is granted a privy purse amounting to 52,778 USD annually.

== List of kings ==
=== Kings / Paramount Chiefs of Lesotho / Basutoland (1822–1966) ===
- Moshoeshoe I: 1822 – 18 January 1870
- Letsie I: 18 January 1870 – 20 November 1891
- Lerotholi Letsie: 20 November 1891 – 19 August 1905
- Letsie II: 21 August 1905 – 28 January 1913
- Nathaniel Griffith Lerotholi: 11 April 1913 – 23 June 1939
- Simon Seeiso Griffith: 3 August 1939 – 26 December 1940
  - Gabasheane Masupha (regent): 26 December 1940 – 28 January 1941
  - 'Mantšebo Amelia 'Matšaba (regent): 28 January 1941 – 12 March 1960
- Moshoeshoe II: 12 March 1960 – 4 October 1966

=== Kings of Lesotho (1966–present) ===
Name	Lifespan	Reign start	Reign end	Notes	Family	Image
Moshoeshoe II (1st reign)	2 May 1938 – 15 January 1996 (aged 57)	4 October 1966	12 November 1990 (Note: Deposed by the military government of General Justin Lekhanya.) (24 years, 39 days)	Son of Simon Seeiso Griffith	House of Moshoeshoe	Moshoeshoe II of Lesotho
Letsie III (1st reign)	17 July 1963 (age 63)	12 November 1990	25 January 1995 (Note: Abdicated in favor of his father, Moshoeshoe II.) (4 years, 74 days)	Son of Moshoeshoe II	House of Moshoeshoe	Letsie III of Lesotho
Moshoeshoe II (2nd reign)	2 May 1938 – 15 January 1996 (aged 57)	25 January 1995	15 January 1996† (355 days)	Son of Simon Seeiso Griffith	House of Moshoeshoe	Moshoeshoe II of Lesotho
Letsie III (2nd reign)	17 July 1963 (age 63)	7 February 1996	Incumbent (30 years, 288 days)	Son of Moshoeshoe II	House of Moshoeshoe	Letsie III of Lesotho

Regent Head of State

- Queen 'Mamohato: 5 June 1970 – 5 December 1970, 10 March 1990 – 12 November 1990 and 15 January 1996 – 7 February 1996

== Royal Standards ==
Royal Standard of Lesotho 1966–1987.

Royal Standard of Lesotho 1987–2006.

Royal Standard of Lesotho from October 4, 2006.

== See also ==
- Politics of Lesotho
- History of Lesotho
- List of prime ministers of Lesotho
