= Mphaki =

- Community Council
- Geographic Center of Community
- Coordinates: 30°13′28″S 28°10′11″E
- Country: Lesotho
- District: Quthing District
- Elevation: 7,421 ft (2,262 m)

Population (2006)
  - Total: 20,288
- Time zone: UTC+2 (CAT)
- Coordinates computed from Lesotho Villages file.

Mphaki is a community council located in the Quthing District of Lesotho. Its population in 2006 was 20,288.

== Villages ==
The community of Mphaki includes the villages of:

- Aupolasi (Tlokoeng)
- Aupolasi (Tšitsong)
- Borokoana
- Ha 'Moloki
- Ha Binare
- Ha Feke
- Ha Folosiri
- Ha Kelebone
- Ha Khethisa
- Ha Komntanta
- Ha Kooko
- Ha Kurulane
- Ha Lazaro (Liteleng)
- Ha Lazaro (Lithakong)
- Ha Lebeko
- Ha Lefelisa
- Ha Lethena
- Ha Machesetsa
- Ha Machesetsa (Taung)
- Ha Machesetsa (Thoteng)
- Ha Maeke
- Ha Mafa
- Ha Mahlomola
- Ha Makatikele
- Ha Makoae
- Ha Malimabe
- Ha Mantsoinyana
- Ha Maphasa
- Ha Maruping
- Ha Masenkane
- Ha Matsie
- Ha Mohapi
- Ha Mohloli
- Ha Moifo
- Ha Mokhethi
- Ha Mokhosi
- Ha Mokoena
- Ha Moreba
- Ha Mosetlelo (Ha Masiu)
- Ha Motau
- Ha Moteane (Mokhoabong)
- Ha Motjoli
- Ha Motseko (Lekhalong)
- Ha Motsiri
- Ha Noko
- Ha Nthunya
- Ha Pali
- Ha Patereisi
- Ha Peete
- Ha Peterose
- Ha Pheello
- Ha Pitso
- Ha Pokisi
- Ha Qhoenya
- Ha Queen
- Ha Rafabia
- Ha Ramosetsanyane
- Ha Ramotsoanyane (Ha Masiu)
- Ha Rantsoelepa (Tiping)
- Ha Rasepelemane
- Ha Rasepelemane (Koluololo)
- Ha Rasepelemane (Trouble Case)
- Ha Rasepelemane (Tsekong)
- Ha Sebota
- Ha Sera
- Ha Setsena
- Ha Thaha
- Ha Tlali
- Ha Tlhaku
- Ha Tlhaku (Maqhenebeng)
- Ha Tokelo
- Ha Tsenki
- Ha Tsepane
- Ha Tšiu (Sebubeng)
- Ha Tsoene
- Kelebone (Ha Motlhotlo)
- Khakeng
- Khakeng (Maphepheng)
- Khakeng (Meeling)
- Khakeng (Thabaneng)
- Khalong-la-Likhama (Tšethe)
- Khohong (Ha Mokhethi)
- Kopanong
- Lekhalong
- Lekhalong (Terai Hoek)
- Letsatseng (Ha Ntami)
- Likhohloaneng
- Limapa (Ha Lemeke)
- Limapa (Ha Mosehle)
- Litšinabelong
- Mahlachaneng
- Majakaneng
- Makhalong
- Makhetheng
- Makoabating
- Masoetseng
- Matšela-Beli
- Matsoapong
- Matšoareng
- Meriting
- Motse-Mocha (Tšitsong)
- Mphaki (Ha 'Maletsoai)
- Mphaki (Ha Morulane)
- Mphaki (Makhalong)
- Nokong (Ha Nchaka)
- Paballong
- Paballong (Pontšeng)
- Phahameng (Ha Tlali)
- Pholeng
- Phuthing (Ha Rampeo)
- Pulane (Khohlong)
- Pulane (Letlapeng)
- Pulane (Moreneng)
- Pulane (Thabaneng)
- Raohang (Ha Hlotse)
- Rolong (Ha Masiu)
- Rothe
- Sekhutloaneng
- Sekokoaneng
- Selomong
- Thaba-Chitja
- Thabang
- Thabong (Tšitsong)
- Tiping
- Tlapaneng
- Tlokoeng (Ha Mokhethi)
- Tšethe
- Tšieng
- Tšitsong (Liphakoeng)
- Tšitsong (Phatlalla)
- Tšitsong (Raohang)
- Tšoeneng (Tšitsong)
