= Letsie I Moshoeshoe of Lesotho =

Paramount Chief of the Basotho, 1870–1891

King Letsie I

Paramount Chief of the Basotho
- Reign: 18 January 1870 – 20 November 1891
- Predecessor: Moshoeshoe I
- Successor: Lerotholi Letsie
- Born: c. 1811
- Died: 20 November 1891; Thaba Bosiu
- Burial: Royal Cemetery, Thaba Bosiu
- Wives: 'MaSenate; 'MaLerotholi; 'MaMotena; 'MaLeshoane; Konesoang
- Issue: 25 including: Senate; Lerotholi; Bereng; Theko; Maama; Seeiso; Makhabane; Mpiti; Nkoebe; Mashapa; Mojela; Sehahle; Mahlomola; Hlakanelo; Mpalipali; Khotso; Ramosoeu; Salae; Loto; Mamoli; Rafolatsane; 'Maselomo; 'Mamathealira; 'Mamohale; 'Mahoela
- House: Moshoeshoe
- Father: Moshoeshoe I
- Mother: 'Mamohato

Letsie I (born Mohato; c. 1811 – 20 November 1891) was the paramount chief (morena e moholo) of the Basotho (modern Lesotho) from 11 March 1870 until his death. His reign bridged the late protectorate period, annexation to the Cape Colony (1871), the Basuto Gun War (1880–1881), and the restoration of direct British rule as the Crown colony of Basutoland in 1884.

== Early life ==
Letsie was the eldest son of Moshoeshoe I and his principal wife ’Mamabela (also styled ’MaMohato). Born Mohato, he adopted the name Letsie at his initiation in 1829, reportedly in remembrance of the Sotho sage Chief Mohlomi. In June 1833 he and his brother Molapo escorted the first missionaries of the Paris Evangelical Missionary Society to Thaba Bosiu and Morija.

== Accession and domains ==
Letsie succeeded Moshoeshoe I on 11 March 1870 and was acknowledged as paramount chief according to Sotho customary law. During his tenure he resided principally at Matsieng, near Morija, while his brothers established influential regional bases (Molapo at Leribe; Masopha at Thaba Bosiu).

== Cape annexation and the Basuto Gun War (1871–1884) ==
In 1871 Basutoland was transferred from imperial protection to the Cape Colony, whose government extended the Peace Preservation Act to disarm the Basotho in 1879. Resistance led to the Basuto Gun War (September 1880 – April 1881), fought by coalition forces of Basotho chiefs, including Letsie's son Lerotholi. The Cape was unable to impose disarmament; the conflict ended with Basotho retention of arms and de facto repudiation of Cape authority. Continued administrative difficulties led to restoration of imperial control: by Order in Council on 2 February 1884 (effective 18 March), Basutoland was withdrawn from the Cape and placed under the British High Commissioner as a separate territory.

== Relations with the British administration ==
Under the first Resident Commissioner Sir Marshal James Clarke (1884–1893), the colonial state sought to govern indirectly through the paramountcy. In 1886 Clarke urged Letsie I (and later Lerotholi) to create a formal advisory council to supplement the traditional pitso assembly; Letsie accepted the proposal in 1889. The institutional evolution culminated in the Basutoland National Council (first sitting 1903) under Lerotholi, but the groundwork dates to Letsie’s reign.

== Death and succession ==
Letsie I died on 20 November 1891. He was succeeded by his eldest surviving son, Lerotholi Letsie (r. 1891–1905).

== Legacy ==
Scholars generally characterize Letsie’s reign as a period of defensive statecraft under intense external pressure: he presided over (1) the transition from protectorate to Cape rule and back to imperial administration, (2) the survival of Basotho territorial integrity after the Gun War, and (3) early moves toward a consultative colonial polity later formalized under his successor.

== See also ==
- Moshoeshoe I
- Basutoland
- Basuto Gun War
- Lerotholi Letsie

Regnal titles
Preceded by Moshoeshoe I	Paramount Chief of the Basotho; 1870–1891	Succeeded by Lerotholi
