= Lerotholi =

Lesotho chief

Lerotholi Letsie (c. 1836–1905) was the paramount chief of Basotho (modern Lesotho) from November 20, 1891 to August 19, 1905. Letsie is one of the chiefs whom led the 1880 Basotho gun war which ended in basotho victory and independence for Lesotho.

== Leadership of Basotho ==
Lerotholi became leader after his father's death in 1891. In 1898, he fought and defeated his uncle somewhere near Thaba Bosiu. He remained leader until his death in 1905. His son Letsie II then became leader of the Basotho.

Regnal titles
Preceded by Letsie I	Paramount Chief of Basutoland; 1891–1905	Succeeded by Letsie II
