= Basutoland =

British Colony from 1884 to 1966

Coordinates: 29.5167°S 27.8000°E

Colony of Basutoland
- 1884–1966
- Flag Coat of arms
- Royal anthem: God Save the Queen (1884–1901; 1952–1966); God Save the King (1901–1952)
- Status: Crown Colony under partial local rule
- Capital: Maseru
- Languages: English (official); Sesotho
- Government: Constitutional monarchy
- Resident Commissioner
  - 1884–1894: Marshal Clarke
  - 1961–1966: Alexander Giles
- Paramount Chief
  - 1884–1891: Letsie I
  - 1960–1966: Moshoeshoe II
- History
  - Established: 18 March 1884
  - Disestablished: 4 October 1966

Area
  - Total: 30,355 km^{2} (11,720 sq mi)

Population
  - 1875: 128,206
  - 1904: 348,848
- Currency: pound sterling; rand (from 1961)
Preceded by	Succeeded by
Cape Colony	Lesotho
- Today part of: Lesotho

Basutoland was a British Crown colony that existed from 1884 to 1966 in present-day Lesotho, bordered with the Cape Colony, Natal Colony and Orange River Colony until 1910 and completely surrounded by South Africa from 1910. Though the Basotho (then known as Basuto) and their territory had been under British control starting in 1868 (and ruled by Cape Colony from 1871), the rule by Cape Colony was unpopular and unable to control the territory. As a result, Basutoland was brought under direct authority of Queen Victoria, via the High Commissioner, and run by an Executive Council presided over by a series of British Resident Commissioners.

It was divided into seven administrative districts: Berea, Leribe, Maseru, Mohale's Hoek, Mafeteng, Qacha's Nek and Quthing.

Basutoland gained its independence from the United Kingdom on 4 October 1966 and was renamed the Kingdom of Lesotho.

== History ==
=== Background ===
Between 1856 and 1868 the Basotho engaged in conflict with the Orange Free State. Their king, Moshoeshoe I, sought British protection. On 29 August 1865, he wrote to Sir Philip Wodehouse, the Governor of Cape Colony:

I am giving myself and my country up to Her Majesty's Government under certain conditions which we may agree on between your Excellency and me.

In July 1866, after referring to the former letter, the Chief said:

All those things I have given up into your hands the last year..., they are still yours. I still continue to be the humble servant of Her Majesty.

Eventually, in January 1868, the Governor received a document dated 9 December 1867, signed by the Secretary of State for the Colonies, authorizing the annexation of Basutoland to the Colony of Natal (not to the Cape as Wodehouse had wished). On 12 March 1868, a proclamation declared the Basotho to be British subjects and Basutoland to be British territory. It was not in fact annexed to Natal, as Natal attempted unsuccessfully to condition its acceptance on Basotho land being made available for European settlement; so for some time Basutoland remained under the direct authority of Wodehouse as British High Commissioner for South Africa.

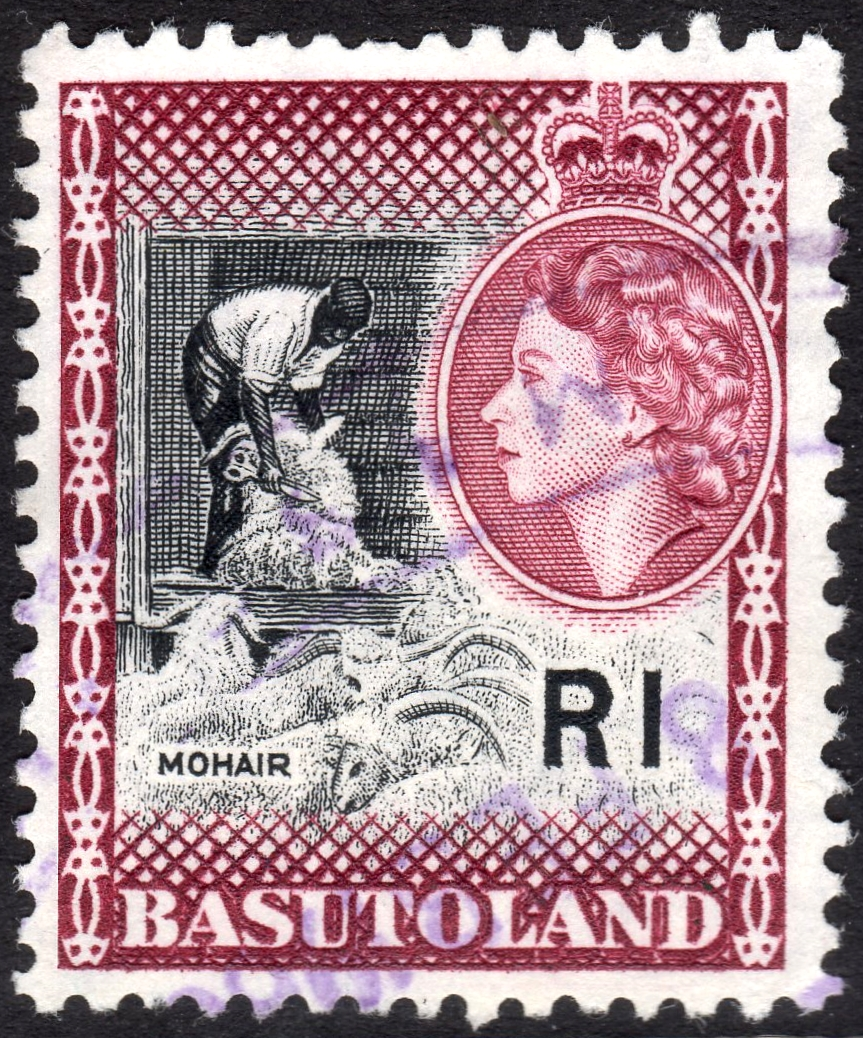
Postage stamp with a portrait of Queen Elizabeth II, 1963

Three years later, Basutoland was annexed to the Cape Colony by Act No. 12 of 1871 of the Parliament of the Cape of Good Hope, confirmed by an Order in Council of 3 November 1871. The rule of the Cape Colony then proved unpopular with the people, leading to the Basuto Gun War of 1880–1881.

By an Order in Council dated 2 February 1884, which came into force on 18 March 1884, royal assent was given to a Cape bill repealing the Act of 1871. Basutoland was thus brought under the direct authority of the Queen, with legislative and executive powers again vested in the High Commissioner.

=== As a crown colony ===
Moshoeshoe had been succeeded as paramount chief by his son, Letsie I, and he in turn was succeeded in 1891 by Lerotholi Letsie I. These chieftains acted in concert with the British representative in the country, to whom was given the title of resident commissioner. The first commissioner was Sir Marshal James Clarke. The period of warfare over, the Basotho turned their attention more and more to agricultural pursuits and Christian missionaries entered the territory. Trade increased, and in 1891 Basutoland was admitted to the customs union, which already existed between Orange Free State, Cape Colony and British Bechuanaland. When Alfred Milner visited Basutoland in 1898, on his way to Bloemfontein, he was received by 15,000 mounted Basotho. The chiefs also attended a large meeting at Maseru. On the outbreak of the Boer War in 1899, these same chiefs proclaimed loyalty to the British Crown. They remained passive throughout the War and the neutrality of the country was respected by both armies. One chief alone sought to take advantage of the situation by disloyal action, and his offence was met by a year's imprisonment.

In pursuance of the policy of encouraging the self-governing powers of the Basotho, a national council was instituted and held its first sitting in July 1903. In August 1905 the paramount chief Lerotholi died. In early life he had distinguished himself in the wars with the Boers, and in 1880 he took an active part in the revolt against the Cape government. Since 1884 he had been a loyal supporter of the imperial authorities, and carried a reputation for high diplomatic gifts. On 19 September following Lerotholi's death, the national council, with the concurrence of the imperial government, elected his son Letsie II as paramount chief. The completion in October 1905 of a railway connecting Maseru with the South African railway system proved a great boon to the community. During the Bambatha Rebellion in 1906 the Basotho remained perfectly quiet.

=== Interwar period ===
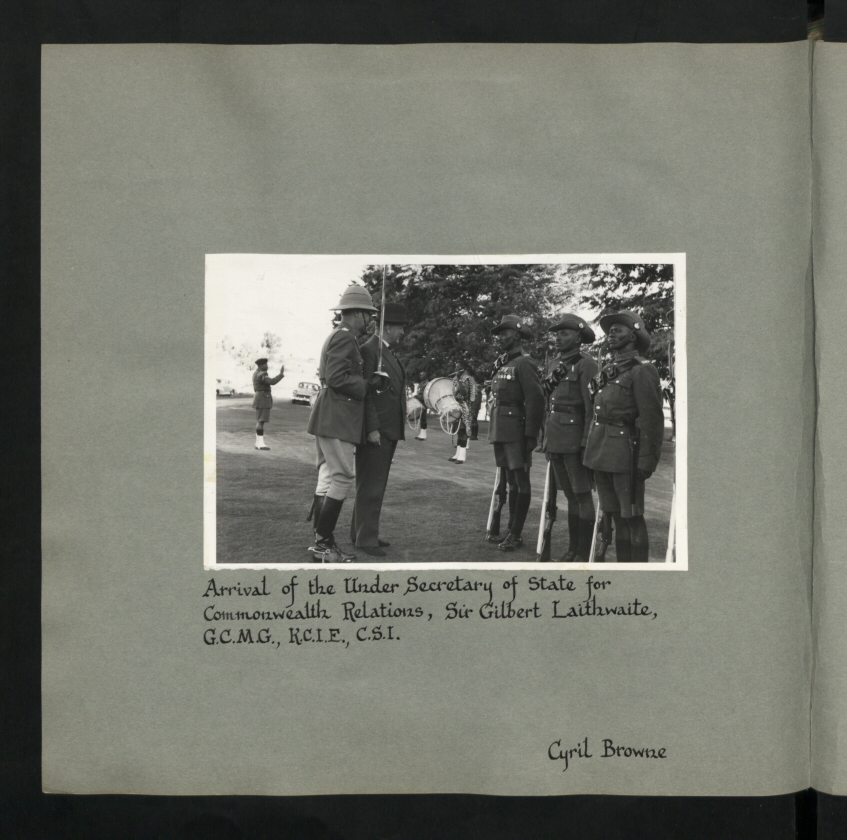
Visit of Colonial Secretary to territory

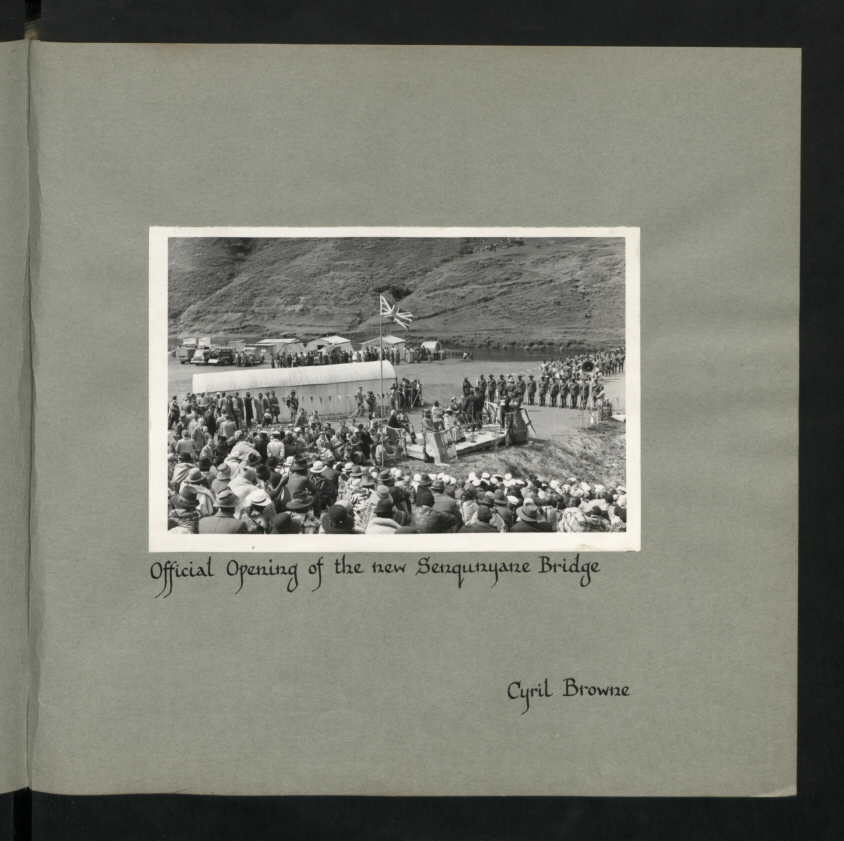
Opening of the new Senqunyane Bridge

The first task of the Basuto National Council was to revise and draft the "old laws of Moshoeshoe I", which they did within three days. These new laws were called the " Laws of Lerotholi" after the sitting Paramount Chief. However the commoners believed that the Chiefs who sat on the council did not follow these laws, leading to opposition by the Commoners Council, one of the earliest political organizations in the territory. This forced the council to pass reforms, recommended in a 1935 study of Basutoland by Alan Pim. This reduced the number of chiefs and their judicial powers. The legality of the National Council itself and the laws it passed came to the forefront in 1940, with a succession crisis caused by the death of Paramount Chief Seeiso Griffith. The regency for his two-year-old son was disputed by his brother Bereng Griffith and his first wife Mantsebo, who had the support of the Resident Commissioner. It was ruled in 1942 in the Basutoland High Court that the "Laws of Lerotholi" were not legally binding and that the British High Commissioner for Southern Africa could choose who they wanted as the Paramount Chief. This led to efforts by the Basotho to convert the National Council into a legislative institution. The country was also badly affected by a combination of land shortages, drought and the arrival of railways. This led to the colony being a net importer of food and an exporter of labor, mostly to the neighboring South Africa. This was addressed in the 1935 study by Pim, who recommended increased investment in agriculture and efforts to stop soil erosion in the territory. This resulted in reforms by the Basutoland government to reduce erosion such as creating buffer strips and cattle grazing schedules. These were met with opposition from the native Basuto due to the fact that it was run mostly by South African administrators and often increased erosion in many places. Development projects that took place in the 1950s also met with similar opposition from the natives, due to the fact that they had very little input into how these projects were managed.

=== Self government ===
From the creation of the Union of South Africa in 1910 the South African government made numerous overtures to take over the High Commission Territories, which included Basutoland. However these demands were refused by Britain, wanting to consult with the inhabitants of the territories regarding their future. With the election of the National Party 1948 opposition to union with South Africa increased both amongst the Basuto and the British, due to the apartheid policies implemented by the new government. This hastened the progress towards independence. After WW2 progress towards self government and independence was slow due to opposition from local Basotho chiefs who feared losing their power and resistance from local colonial officials. In 1959 the Basutoland National Council, a body established in 1903, became a semi legislative body consisting of 80 members, half of whom were to be elected by the district councils. The others were tribal chiefs, nominated by the Paramount Chief and four officials. In the elections that followed the African nationalist Basutoland Congress Party achieved the overwhelming majority of elected seats.

=== Independence ===
In 1964 a constitutional conference in London resulted in the enactment of a new constitution which gave the country full self government with the Paramount Chief at its head assisted by a bicameral Parliament. The British Resident Commissioner was left only with the responsibilities of external affairs, defense and internal security. It was also decided that one year after elections were held under the new constitution the new Parliament could request independence. In the 1965 elections the conservative and pro South African Basutoland National Party, under chief Leabua Jonathon, won a narrow majority, with 31 seats out of the 60 seats in the National Assembly. Independence came as promised a year later in 1966, despite opposition from both the Paramount Chief who resented the reductions in his power as established by the 1964 Constitution and the opposition, who feared that Jonathon's pro South African stance would result in the country becoming a vassal to the Apartheid regime. The challenge the country faced at independence was that it was underdeveloped and completely economically dependent on neighboring South Africa. This was mostly due to a lack of interest from Britain in developing the territory. This fact was acknowledged by the last British Commissioner, Sir Alexander Giles who wrote:

Britain's neglect over the past century has led to Basutoland's complete dependence on the Republic of South Africa, and that by granting independence with insufficient aid Britain is in fact 'selling out' the territory to the Republic. Impecunious independence will not be independence at all, and for this Britain must bear the responsibility

== Government ==
=== Executive branch ===
Basutoland's Executive Council members were the resident commissioner, who presided, three ex-officio members and four council members from the Basutoland National Council, appointed by the resident commissioner, one by the Paramount Chief and three nominated by the Council itself, selected by secret ballot.

=== Legislative branch ===
The legislative council, known as the Basutoland National Council, consisted of a non-voting President appointed by the Resident Commissioner, four official members (ex officio), twenty-two Chiefs, forty elected members elected by District Councils, and fourteen nominated members appointed by the Resident Commissioner on the nomination of the Paramount Chief. The Resident Commissioner had the right to address the council.

The Commissioner had authority to make laws by Proclamation on certain subjects, such as external affairs, defence and the public service. These matters were excluded from the powers of the National Council, but the Commissioner was required to lay a draft of any Proclamation before the council and to consider their observations. The Constitution made special provision regarding particular objections made by the council.

=== Paramount Chief ===
There was a College of Chiefs of Basutoland whose function related to matters pertaining to the offices of the Paramount Chief, Chief and Headman. Their decisions and recommendations were submitted for acceptance to the Paramount Chief. They were subject to review by the High Court.

The Constitution vested a number of functions in the Paramount Chief. In exercising these, he was required in most cases to consult either with the Executive Council or with the Resident Commissioner, a Council member of the Executive and a member of the Basotho Nation appointed by himself.

Land in Basutoland was vested by the Constitution in the Paramount Chief in trust for the Basotho Nation, subject to lawfully acquired rights.

== Demographics ==
Considering the extensive area of uninhabitable mountain land it contained, the territory supported a mediocre population. The inhabitants increased from 128,206 in 1875, to 348,848 in 1904. Women outnumbered men by about 20,000, which was, however, about the number of adult men away from the country at any given period. The majority lived in the district between the Maloti Mountains and the Caledon River. The great bulk of the people were Basotho, but there were some thousands of Barolong and other natives. The White inhabitants in 1904 numbered 895. Maseru, the seat of government, had in 1904 a population of about 1,000 including some 100 Europeans.

== Economy ==
Throughout the period of British rule the country remained economically underdeveloped and under the control of the tribal chiefs. This lack of interest in development can be explained by the fact that until the 1950s the primary focus of the colonial administration was the maintenance of law and order rather than economic development. This, combined with a desire from the Colonial Office in London not to spend much money through aid on what it considered a backwater and low government revenue meant that until independence little significant economic development took place in the territory. This lack of development meant that the colony was reliant on food and health services from South Africa. Furthermore, key parts of its economy were also dependent on remittances from Basotho workers in South Africa. This led to the perception amongst the Basotho that they were little more than a "Bantustan" of South Africa. However, as independence approached more international organisations, like the American Peace Corps and the World Bank began to provide funding towards economic growth and development. The British also began providing more money to the government through the Colonial Development Fund throughout the 1950s and 1960s.

== Districts ==
- Berea District
- Leribe District
- Maseru District
- Mohales Hoek District
- Mafeteng District
- Qacha's Nek District
- Quthing District

== British Resident Commissioners ==
Incumbent	Tenure		Notes
Incumbent	Took office	Left office	Notes
Sir Marshal James Clarke	18 March 1884	18 September 1894	Afterwards Resident Commissioner in Zululand, 1894
Godfrey Yeatman Lagden	18 September 1894	1895	
Sir Herbert Cecil Sloley	1895		
Sir Godfrey Yeatman Lagden	1895	1901	
Sir Herbert Cecil Sloley	1902	1903	
James MacGregor	1913		
Sir Herbert Cecil Sloley	1913	1916	
Robert Thorne Coryndon	1916	1917	Afterwards Governor of Uganda, 1918
Sir Edward Charles Frederick Garraway	1917	Apr 1926	
John Christian Ramsay Sturrock	Apr 1926	Mar 1935	
Sir Edmund Charles Smith Richards	Mar 1935	Aug 1942	Afterwards Governor of Nyasaland, 1942
Sir Charles Noble Arden-Clarke	Aug 1942	Nov 1946	Afterwards Governor of Sarawak, 1946
Aubrey Denzil Forsyth-Thompson	Nov 1946	24 October 1951	
Edwin Porter Arrowsmith	24 October 1951	Sep 1956	
Alan Geoffrey Tunstal Chaplin	Sep 1956	1961	
Alexander Falconer Giles	1961	30 April 1965	

== Chief Justices ==
The Chief Justice was the Chief Justice of the High Commission Territories (Basutoland, Bechuanaland Protectorate and Swaziland). From 1951 the Chief Justices were:

Incumbent	Tenure		Notes
Incumbent	Took office	Left office	Notes
Walter Huggard	1937	1948	
Walter Harragin	1950	1952	
Harold Curwen Willan	1952	1956	
Herbert Charles Fahie Cox	1957	1961	
Elyan	1961	1962	
Peter Watkin-Williams	1961	1965	
Benson	1965	1966	
