= Quthing District =

Coordinates: 30°25′S 28°00′E

Quthing
- District
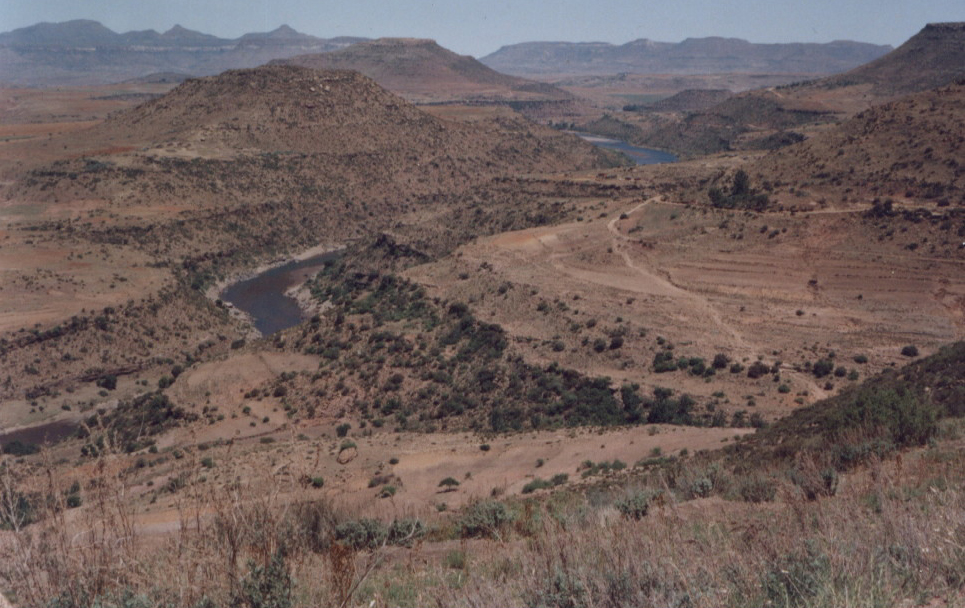
- Quthing Senqu

- Map of Lesotho with the district highlighted
- Country: Lesotho
- Capital: Quthing (Moyeni)

Area
  - Total: 2,916 km^{2} (1,126 sq mi)

Population (2016)
  - Total: 115,469
  - Density: 39.60/km^{2} (102.6/sq mi)
- Time zone: UTC+2 (CAT)
- Area code: +266
- HDI (2019): 0.476 low · 8th

Quthing is a district of Lesotho. The town of Quthing (also known as Moyeni) is the camp town or capital of the district. There are two of the most important sets of dinosaur footprints in the region. There is a large panel of Bushman paintings at Qomoqomong. Quthing district is home to the Masitise Cave House, a satellite location of the Morija Museum & Archives. In the southwest, south and east, Quthing borders on the Eastern Cape Province of South Africa. Domestically, it borders Mohale's Hoek District in the north and Qacha's Nek District in the northeast.

As of 2006, the district had a population of 124,048 which was 6.61 per cent of the total population of the country. The total area of the district was 2,916 which was 9.61 per cent of the total area of the country. As of 2008, there were totally 62,602 employed people out of a total of 140,057 people in the district above 15 years of age.

== Demographics ==
As of 2006, the district had a population of 124,048, 6.61 per cent of the population of the country. The total area of the district was 2,916, 9.61 per cent of the country. The population density in the district was 43.00 persons per square kilometre, compared to 62 for the country. There were five constituencies and ten community councils in the district. As of 2006, 312 people tested HIV positive, 23.20 per cent of the HIV-positive persons in the country. 115 of these (18.90%) were men; 198 (25.70%) were women.

== Economy ==
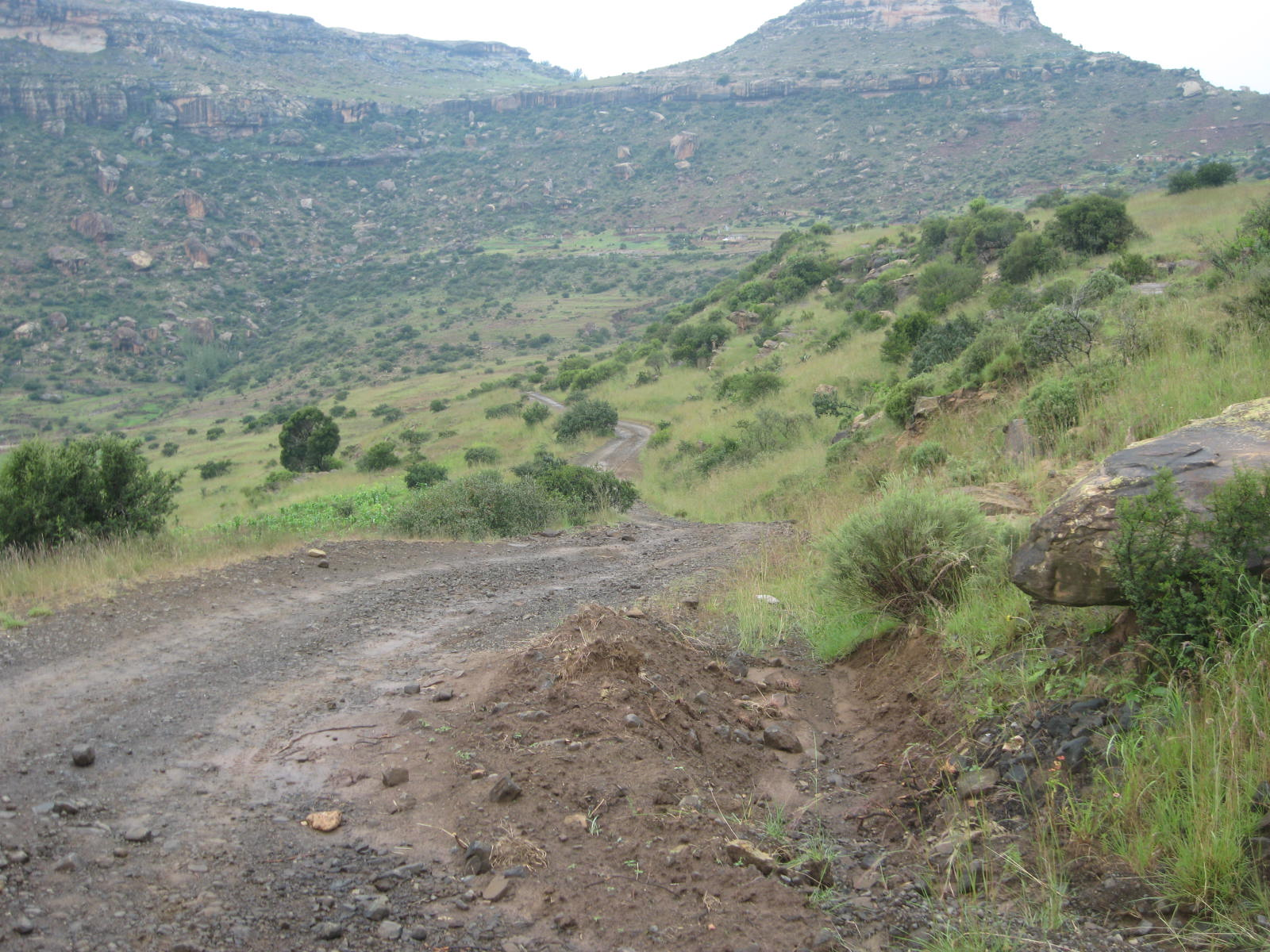
Mt. Moroosi as viewed from the district

As of 2008, there were totally 62,602 employed people out of a total of 140,057 people in the district above 15 years of age. The employed population in the age group of 6–14 years was 1,828 out of a total of 41,972 people in the district in the age group. The labour force participation stood at 185.10. The number of people involved in subsistence agriculture is 1,388 and the number of people in other sectors was 440. The number of unemployed people in the district was 23,308 and the unemployment rate was 81.6 per cent. The total area planted in 2009 was 7,543 which formed 1.87 per cent of the total area planted in the country. The total production was 3,533 tonnes, which was 2.35 per cent of the totals in the country. The major crop was maize, while wheat, sorghum, beans and peas were the other crops planted. The total production of maize was 2,298 tonnes, beans was 280 tonnes, sorghum was 012 tonnes, peas was 775 tonnes and wheat was 168 tonnes as of 2008. As of 2007, there were a total of 137 km (85 mi) of paved roads in the district, with 127 km (79 mi) paved roads and 10 km (6.2 mi) of unpaved roads.

== Geography ==
In the southwest, south and east, Quthing borders on the Eastern Cape Province of South Africa. Domestically, it borders Mohale's Hoek District in the north and Qacha's Nek District in the northeast. The Western districts of Lesotho has predominantly low land zone with an elevation of 1,500 m (4,900 ft) 1,800 m (5,900 ft) above the sea level. These lands are the major agricultural zones in the country. The average annual rainfall in the country is 100 cm (39 in), most of which is received during the rainy season of October to April. Though it rains during all the months of the year, groundwater is limited on account of run-offs. The region has a temperate climate on account of the elevation and is humid during most parts of the year. The temperature in low lands vary from 32 °C (90 °F) to −7 °C (19 °F) in the winter.

Climate data for Quthing District
Month	Jan	Feb	Mar	Apr	May	Jun	Jul	Aug	Sep	Oct	Nov	Dec	Year
Mean daily maximum °C (°F)	27 (81)	26 (79)	24 (75)	21 (70)	19 (66)	15 (59)	16 (61)	20 (68)	22 (72)	27 (81)	27 (81)	28 (82)	23 (73)
Mean daily minimum °C (°F)	15 (59)	15 (59)	13 (55)	8 (46)	8 (46)	4 (39)	2 (36)	3 (37)	6 (43)	12 (54)	14 (57)	15 (59)	10 (49)
Average rainfall mm (inches)	92 (3.6)	101 (4.0)	79 (3.1)	39 (1.5)	19 (0.7)	65 (2.6)	1 (0.0)	3 (0.1)	2 (0.1)	23 (0.9)	89 (3.5)	230 (9.1)	742 (29.2)
Source 1:
Source 2:

== Administration ==
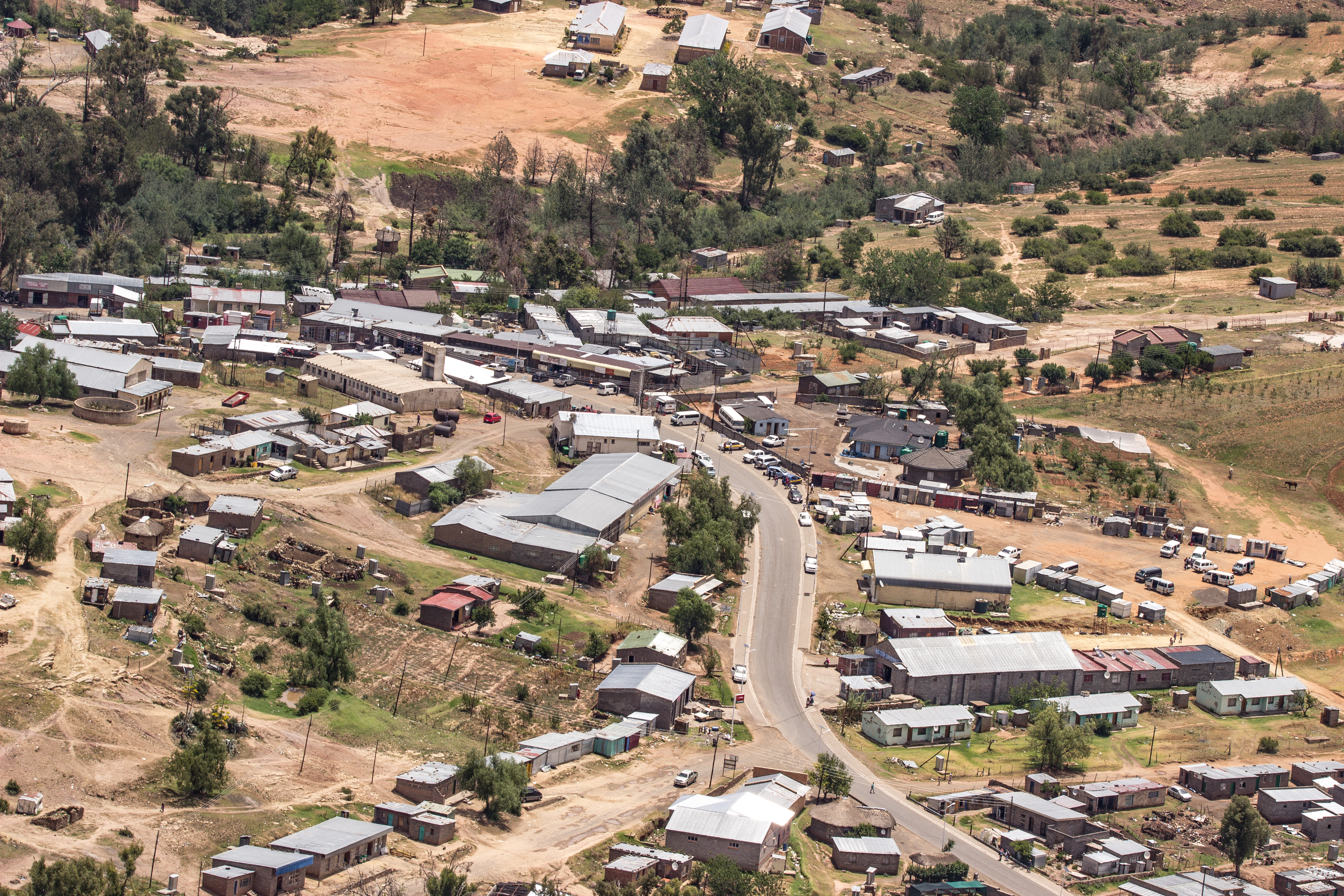
Mount Moorosi town in Quthing

Constituencies of Quthing District are Mount Moorosi, Moyeni, Qhoali and Sempe. Community councils of Quthing District are Ha Nkoebe, Likhohlong, Liphakoe, Matsatseng, Mkhono, Mokotjomela, Mphaki, Qomoqomong, Seforong and Tsatsane. As per the 1968 Local Government Repeal Act - Development Committees Order No.9 of 1986, a District Development Committee (DDC) should have a set of Ward Development Committees (WDC) for each ward and Village Development Committees (VDC) under it. Each VDC has a set of seven elected members and the head would be an ex-officio member and chairman of the committee. The WDC is composed of twelve members elected from about VDCs, whose chairman would be and ex-officio member. The fifteen-membered DDC is elected by the members of WDC. When there are cases of more than one DDC, the chiefs would alternate in meetings. The district secretary co-ordinates the activities of the various committees. As per the Local Government Amendment Act 2004, the District Development Coordination Committee was established as the supreme body of district administration, under which all the district councils were branched. The urban and municipal councils were under each district council, which in turn had community councils under it. The Independent Electoral Commission (IEC) is responsible for the administration of the Local Government Elections. The nation's first local government elections were conducted in April 2005, while the most recent elections were held in October 2011. During these elections, 64 community councils, 11 urban councils and one municipal council were elected.
