= Letsie II Lerotholi =

Paramount chief of the Basotho (1867–1913)

Letsie II Lerotholi (Letsienyane) (1867–1913), paramount chief of Basotho (later Lesotho) from 1905 to 1913. Letsienyane was the son of Lerotholi. He became the ruler upon the death of Lerotholi in 1905, but took little interest in government. He was succeeded by his brother, Nathaniel Griffith Lerotholi.

Regnal titles
Preceded by Lerotholi	Paramount Chief of Basotholand; 1905–1913	Succeeded by Nathaniel Griffith Lerotholi
