= Moshoeshoe II of Lesotho =

King of Lesotho (1966–90; 1995–96)

Moshoeshoe II
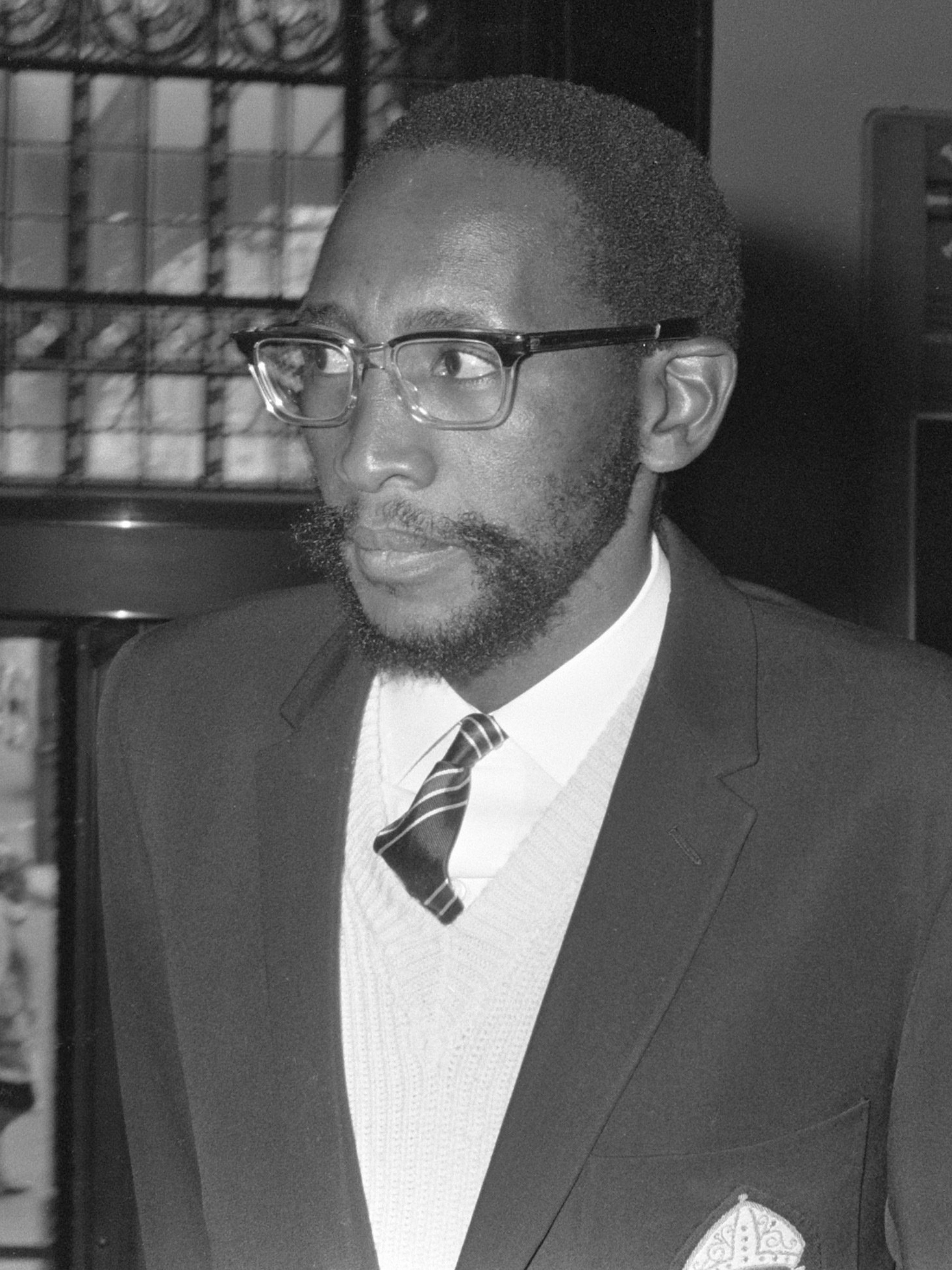
- Moshoeshoe in 1970

King of Lesotho
- First reign: 4 October 1966 – 12 November 1990
- Predecessor: Himself as Paramount Chief of Basutoland
- Successor: Letsie III
- Second reign: 25 January 1995 – 15 January 1996
- Predecessor: Letsie III
- Successor: Letsie III
- Born: 2 May 1938; Morija, Basutoland (now Lesotho)
- Died: 15 January 1996 (aged 57); Maloti Mountains, Lesotho
- Burial: Thaba Bosiu
- Spouse: Tabitha 'Masentle Lerotholi Mojela
- Issue Detail: Letsie III; Prince Seeiso Bereng Seeiso; Princess Constance Christina 'Maseeiso
Names
- Constantine Bereng Seeiso
- House: Moshoeshoe
- Father: Simon Seeiso Griffith
- Mother: 'Mabereng
- Religion: Catholic

Moshoeshoe II (2 May 1938 – 15 January 1996), previously known as Constantine Bereng Seeiso, was Paramount Chief of Basutoland, succeeding Paramount Chief Seeiso from 1960 until the country gained full independence from Britain in 1966. He was King of Lesotho from 1966 until his exile in 1990, and from 1995 until his death in 1996.

== Early life ==
Moshoeshoe was born with the name Constantine Bereng Seeiso and was the descendant of the founder of the nation, Moshoeshoe I, which is where he got his royal name. The young Seeiso was educated at the Roma College in Lesotho, then (apparently fleeing rumours that his stepfather planned to poison him) was sent to England, first to Ampleforth College and later to Corpus Christi College, Oxford. While there, he took to the life of an English country gentleman, including hunting, shooting, and fishing.

== Reign ==
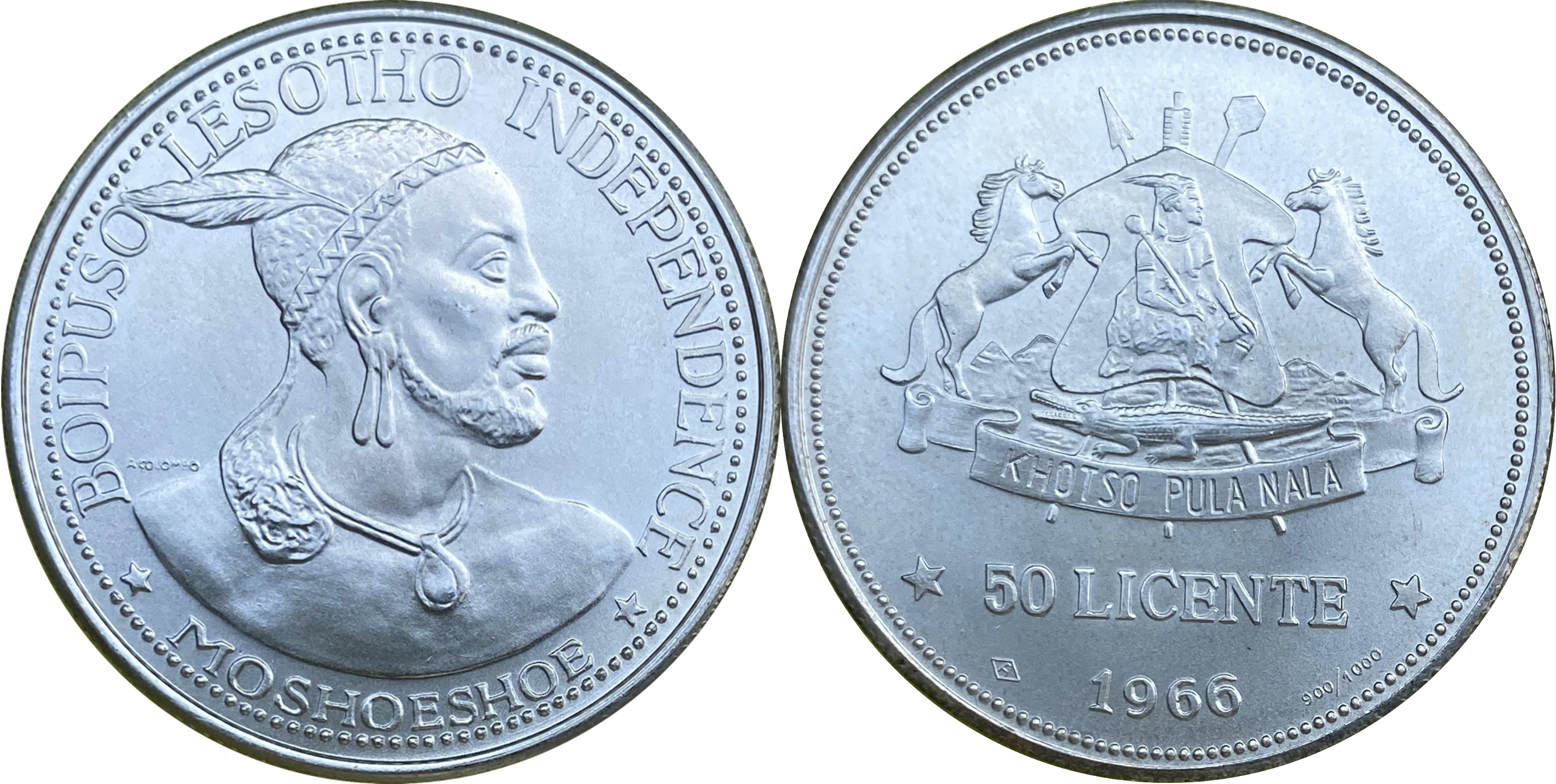
Silver coin: 50 Licente of Lesotho, portrait of King Moshoeshoe II, cast in 1966

Moshoeshoe's political power was always limited, and his reign was interrupted twice. Early in his reign, Chief Leabua Jonathan became Prime Minister of Lesotho and gained control of the government. Jonathan suspended Moshoeshoe in 1970 to reestablish his control in the country after his party lost the election. Moshoeshoe went into temporary exile in the Netherlands. A few months later, when he gained control, Jonathan allowed Moshoeshoe to reassume the title of King. Jonathan was himself overthrown in 1986 and the King gained some power, but he was deposed in 1990, while his son Letsie III was forced to take his place as King. Moshoeshoe went to exile in the United Kingdom, but was restored to the throne in 1995. In 1996, he was killed in a car accident, and Letsie became King again a month later.

During the political turmoil of 1970 and 1990, and for a month after his death in 1996, his wife and Letsie's mother, 'Mamohato, acted as regent.

Summary of reign

- 1960–1966: Paramount Chief Constantine Bereng Seeiso of Basutoland.
- 1966: crowned as King Moshoeshoe II of Lesotho.
- 1970: exiled from Lesotho.
- February 1990: stripped of constitutional powers.
- November 1990: deposed, his son Letsie III becomes king.
- 1990–1992: in exile in the UK.
- January 1995: reinstated as King.
- January 1996: died, succeeded by Letsie III.

== Death ==
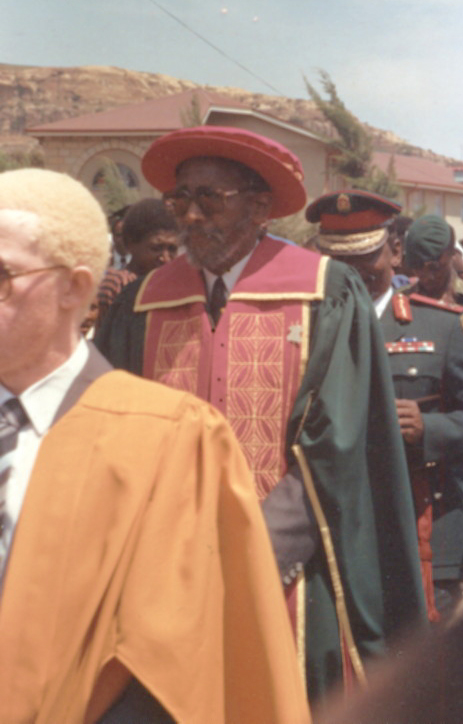
Moshoeshoe II in 1988

King Moshoeshoe II died at the age of 57 in a road accident, when his car plunged off a mountain road during the early hours of 15 January 1996. The accident also killed the car's driver. According to a government statement, Moshoeshoe had set out at 1am to visit his cattle at Matsieng, and was returning to Maseru through the Maloti Mountains when his car left the road.

== Family ==
Moshoeshoe married Princess Tabitha 'Masentle Lerotholi Mojela (later known as Queen 'Mamohato of Lesotho) in 1962, and with her had two sons and one daughter:

- Prince David Mohato Bereng Seeiso, subsequently King Letsie III of Lesotho (born 17 July 1963).
- Prince Seeiso Bereng Seeiso of Lesotho (born 16 April 1966).
- Princess Constance Christina 'Maseeiso (24 December 1969 – 7 September 1994).

== Honours ==
=== Grand Master of the following orders ===
- Lesotho : Grand Master of the Most Dignified Order of Moshoeshoe (Order of Dignity).
- Lesotho : Grand Master of the Most Courteous Order of Lesotho.
- Lesotho : Grand Master of the Most Meritorious Order of Mohlomi (Order of Achievement).
- Lesotho : Grand Master of the Most Loyal Order of Ramatseatsane (Distinguished Service Order).
- Lesotho : Grand Master of the Most Gallant Order of Makoanyane (Order of Bravery).

=== Foreign honours ===
- South Africa : Supreme Companion of the Order of the Companions of O. R. Tambo (posthumous, 20 April 2006).
- Iran : Commemorative Medal of the 2500th Anniversary of the founding of the Persian Empire (14 October 1971).

Moshoeshoe II of Lesotho House of Moshoeshoe Born: May 2 1938 Died: January 15 1996
Regnal titles
Preceded by Himself as Paramount Chief of Basutoland	King of Lesotho; 1966–1970	Succeeded by None
Preceded by None	King of Lesotho; 1970–1990	Succeeded by Letsie III
Preceded by Letsie III	King of Lesotho; 1995–1996	Succeeded by Letsie III
