= Rakotsoana =

Rakotsoane
- Born: Late 18th century
- Died: Mid-19th century
- Known for: Capture and consumption of Peete, grandfather of Moshoeshoe I

Rakotsoane (fl. 1820s) was the chief of a group of displaced persons who resorted to cannibalism during the Difaqane (or Mfecane) period in Southern Africa. He is primarily documented in Basotho oral tradition and historical records for his role in the capture and death of Peete, the grandfather of Moshoeshoe I, during the founding migration of the Basotho nation.

== Background ==
The early 19th century in Southern Africa was defined by the Lifaqane (lit. '"the crushing" or "need for sustenance"'), a period of extreme social upheaval, widespread warfare, and famine. The total collapse of agriculture and the loss of livestock led to desperate survival measures. According to missionary records, several groups in the Maloti Mountains and the Caledon River valley turned to cannibalism as a direct consequence of the "Mahlatule" famine.

Chief Rakotsoane's group belonged to the Bakgatla of Tabane and operated from Sefikeng. Historical estimates suggest that at the height of the famine, thousands of individuals in the region were driven to similar practices to avoid starvation.

== Death of Peete ==
In 1824, Moshoeshoe I led his followers on a perilous journey from Butha-Buthe after his defeat by Mmanthatisi of Batlokwa to the mountain fortress of Thaba Bosiu. The group included vulnerable, old, and frail members who fell behind at the rugged Lipetu Pass near Malimong. Among them was Peete, the elderly father of Mokhachane and Moshoeshoe's primary mentor.

Rakotsoane's group ambushed this rear guard and captured Peete along with several others. By the time Moshoeshoe's warriors arrived to attempt a rescue, Peete had been killed and consumed. This event caused immense psychological and spiritual distress to the burgeoning Basotho nation, as Peete was a sacred link to the ancestral line.

== Restorative justice and cleansing ==
When Rakotsoane and his followers were eventually captured, Moshoeshoe's advisors, including his younger brother, Posholi, demanded their execution. Moshoeshoe I famously intervened and argued that because the cannibals had consumed Peete, their bodies had become his "living grave." To execute them would be to desecrate the remains of his ancestor.

Moshoeshoe ordered a traditional cleansing ritual where the cannibals were smeared with cattle rumen (waste from the stomach) to "purify" the graves. Instead of punishment, they were given grain, land, and cattle and reintegrated into society. Moshoeshoe stated, "One does not disturb the graves of one's ancestors," and "Cannibalism is a disease of the stomach."

== Legacy ==
Rakotsoane's rehabilitation became a cornerstone of Basotho identity. It proved that Moshoeshoe I could build a nation not just through military force, but through unprecedented diplomacy and forgiveness. The descendants of Rakotsoane's group were eventually absorbed into the broader Basotho population, effectively ending the era of cannibalism in the region.
