= Battle of Naauwpoort =

1865 battle

The Battle of Naauwpoort Nek refers to a clash between the Trekboers and Basotho warriors on 29 September 1865. Naauwpoort lies immediately to the north of the Free State town of Clarens.

== Battle ==
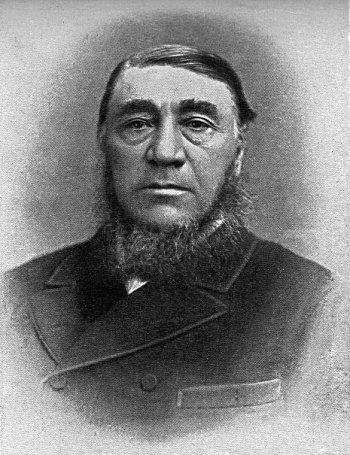
Paul Kruger

Conflict between the Basotho and European settlers from 1858 to 1868, in and around the Lesotho and the Free State, were fought to maintain territorial rights. Following an attack on Trekboers in what is now Harrismith by the Batlôkwa led by the warrior chieftainess, Manthatisi, Paul Kruger ordered the dispatch of 300 – 400 South African Republic men to clean up Witsieshoek. The men pushed the Basotho through the Golden Gate Highlands and set up camp for the night near Clarens on a farm called Bashoek on 28 September 1865. Around 10pm when they arrived, they did not arrange a campsite formed by a circle of wagons, often referred to as a laager, as soldiers usually did in South African history. The horses were also not hobbled. Earlier in the morning of 29 September while it was still dark, Basotho warriors charged on the unsuspecting group, killing five Trekboers (or burghers) while the unhobbled horses escaped.

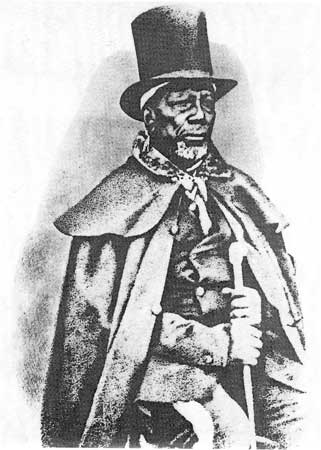
Moshoeshoe

War was declared between the South African Republic, also known as the Transvaal, and the Basutoland people's leader Morena e Moholo Moshoeshoe I. Within two days of word being sent out about the violent conflict, more armed men from neighbouring settlements including Paul Roux, Bethlehem and Senekal arrived to assist the Trekboers. The commando reassembled his team and managed to drive the Basotho back through Naauwpoort Nek about two kilometres away where many of the warriors were wounded and killed. This attack near Titanic Rock on native people by the European settlers is called the Battle of Naauwpoort Nek.

== Aftermath ==
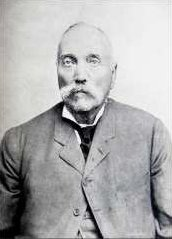
Marthinus Wessel Pretorius

Marthinus Wessel Pretorius and Kruger led a 1000-man-strong commando south to assist the Orange Free State during the Free State–Basotho Wars between 1865 and 1866. The Orange Free State waged the second Free State-Basotho war in 1865. This is commonly known as the Seqiti War. The word "seqiti" refers to the sound that the Boer canons made when they permeated the Basotho strongholds, which is mainly what is now known as the Free State Province.

The Basotho were defeated by the Boers and the Free State army forcibly took the Basotho's cattle and destroyed their crops. During this time, they also made two unsuccessful attempts to invade Moshoeshoe's stronghold in Thaba Bosiu.

Moshoeshoe unsuccessfully appealed for protection from the British and was forced to sign the treaty of Thaba Bosiu, surrendering large territories to the British. The Basotho were appalled by the terms of the treaty and conflict broke out again in 1867.

Johannes Brand, the fourth State President of the Orange Free State decided not to share any of this newly colonised land with the Transvaal burghers. Instead the Transvaal burghers were scandalised and returned home all together, despite Kruger's efforts.

== Commemoration ==
Since then, the Nek is best known for the actions of Paul Kruger and his commando. In 1912, Clarens was named in honour of Paul Kruger during the declaration of the new settlement. Kruger spent his last days as a voluntary exile in a village called Clarens in Switzerland, and thus Clarens was named after this Swiss town.

A monument that stands on the square was erected in honour of the five burghers where they died during the collision with the Basotho. Today only three graves are visible and it is believed that the missing two were disinherited by their families and buried on family farms a few years later in the Transvaal. The monument was initially unveiled in front of a large crowd on 16 December 1895, revealing the names of the five burghers. Later the monument was moved to present-day Clarens, concurring with the golden jubilee in 1962, where the first State President of the Republic of South Africa Charles Robberts Swart unveiled it again.

A statue in Moshoeshoe's honour was erected in Thaba Bosiu between the Caledon and Orange River Lesotho's Maseru District. This area is particularly significant to the Basotho people because it was where the Basotho nation was born and united after being scattered by other nations.

The Moshoeshoe I International Airport in Maseru, Lesotho's capital city, was named in honour of the great king.

The Basotho warriors who were killed by the Trekboer were not commemorated.

== See also ==
- History of South Africa
- Paul Kruger
