= Kgosi Sekonyela =

Batlokwa chief

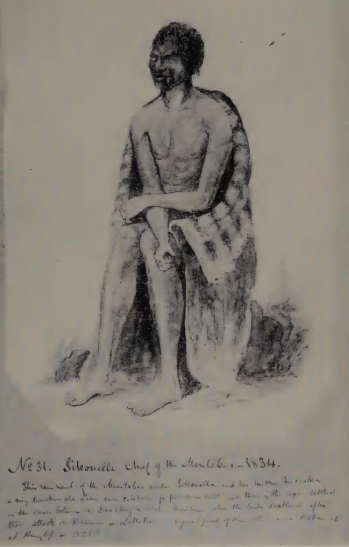
- Sekonyela in 1834

Chief of Batlokwa ba Mokotleng
- Reign: 1824 – 1853
- Predecessor: Manthatisi (as regent)
- Successor: Lehana ( as regent)
- Born: Sekonyela c. 1804
- Died: June 20, 1856; Wittenberg Reserve, Herschel
- Issue: Maketekete
- Father: Mokotjo
- Mother: Manthatisi

Kgosi Sekonyela (c. 1804 – 20 July 1856) was a chief of the Batlokwa people. He effectively took over the chieftainship from his mother queen Manthatisi in 1824 settling in Jwalaboholo in modern day northern Lesotho. He regularly engaged in cattle raids on neighbouring tribes, often to the detriment of his own people. In late 1853, Sekonyela's Tlôkwa Chiefdom was defeated by the army of Basotho king Moshoeshoe I. Most of his tribesmen were subsequently dispersed or absorbed by the victors. Sekonyela moved to Herschel where he died three years later.

== Early life ==
Sekonyela was born around 1804, he was the son of Kgosi Mokotjo of the Batlokwa people who married Monyalue of the Basia, who then became Manthatisi after the birth of their first child – Nthatisi. At the time the Batlokwa were living in the valleys of the Namahadi River. Mokotjo was the chief of the Mokotleng Tlokwa chiefdom. Mokotjo died following an illness while on a mission to claim the area around Hohobeng from the rival Batlokwa chief Lebasa. Mokotjo contracted a disease, died, and his body was sent back to Nkwe for burial. At the time of Mokotjo's death, Sekonyela was only nine years old and it would be another ten years before he was old enough to rule. The same thing had happened to Mokotjo's mother Ntlo-Kholo who had married Montueli. When Montueli died, Ntlo-Kholo assumed chieftainship until Mokotjo came of age. When Manthatisi became regent, she sent Sekonyela to live with her people – the Basia – in order to protect him from political rivalry. The Basia lived south of the Batlokwa and were their allies. Sekonyela attended circumcision school with the Basia people, assisted by his uncle Letlala, the chief of the Basia. At the time the Mokotleng were among the most powerful chiefdoms in the Highveld.

== Reign ==
Following the outbreak of the Mfecane wars, Manthatisi led her people on two years of wandering between the Sand and Orange Rivers. During that period, the Batlokwa lived mainly through plunder before finally settling at Marabeng during the winter of 1824. By then both the population of the tribe and its cattle herds had been significantly reduced. It was at that time that Sekonyela re-joined the tribe and effectively took over leadership from his mother. The exact year he ascended to chieftainship is unknown, he had certainly done so by 1834.

One of his major challenges was encounters with the European missionaries in the 1830s. While some black kingdoms were friendly towards the missionaries, others were hostile. Sekonyela was one of the rulers who remained distrustful of the missionaries. In addition, another European group – the Voortrekker came into contact with the Batlokwa; moving from the Cape into the interior. Seeking land and livestock, in some instances they negotiated their way into black communities, in other instances dislodging them. This caused major conflicts. In 1830, Sekonyela and his people settled near the Caledon River, where his major rival became King Moshoeshoe I. They rivaled for control over modern day northern Lesotho. For twenty years, the two rivals raided each other and competed for adherents from the many refugee bands in the region.

In 1836 French missionary Arbousset visited Sekonyela, estimating his tribe to number approximately 14,000 people; of whom 1,400 lived around Marabeng. The same year, the Batlokwa were attacked by Korana raiders. Sekonyela was impressed by their skills, which included horse riding and shooting, and requested them to impart those skills on to his people. Their relations did not last long, as soon disputes led the Korana out, who relocated to Koranaberg (Excelsior and Marquard). This was after stealing most of the cattle of the Batlokwa. Sekonyela then relocated across the Caledon. A year later there were encounters again with the Korana, which led the Batlokwa deep into the Maloti Mountains and their cattle were once again looted. The wars with the Korana and his indiscriminate cattle raiding cost Sekonyela heavily in both in cattle and followers. At one point he only commanded 700 people.

In 1837, Sekonyela's tribesmen stole some cattle from the Zulu chief Dingane. When the latter requested restitution, Sekonyela sent an insulting reply. Dingane employed the services of Voortrekker leader Piet Retief who imprisoned Sekonyela by trickery. The Batlokwa were forced to return Dingane's stolen cattle along with ransom totaling 700 cattle, 70 horses and 30 muskets for his release. Sekonyela obliged and was freed. Retief decided not to surrender Sekonyela to Dingane, who had initially asked for 300 cows. The rest, Retief took for himself. He also confiscated guns from the Batlokwa, which Sekonyela had obtained through barter. Retief decided to put the blame on Sekonyela so that he could negotiate a Voortrekker settlement in Dingane's area. This however did not work in Retief's favour as Dingane went ahead and executed him and his entourage.

In May 1849, Sekonyela and the Korana, particularly their leader Gert Taaibosch, were reconciled and this is when a number of attacks against Moshoeshoe I were carried out. In the past, the Korana and Moshoeshoe I had disputes over land, particularly land near the Caledon. On 1 September 1850, Major Henry Douglas Warden - who was in charge of the Orange Free State, after it was annexed by the British in 1848 – was granted permission by the Orange Free State government to take military action against Sekonyela in order to end the frequent attacks on the Basotho and Bataung. This was after Moshoeshoe I and the Bataung had complained about the frequent raids by Sekonyela. This was however not realised due to mediation from Taaibosch. Sekonyela paid a fine of 300 cows after showing remorse. During that time Sekonyela also led some successful cattle raids against neighbouring chiefdoms to the north and north-east. In February 1852, Assistant Commissioner Hogge met with Moshoeshoe I, assuring him that the British would no longer interfere into inter-tribal conflicts. Having significantly surpassed Sekoyela's chiefdom in strength and growing tired of his raiding Moshoeshoe I was determined to punish any further incursions.

In March 1852, the Batlokwa stole 10 of Moshoeshoe's best horses. Moshoeshoe assembled warriors from across his kingdom and was joined by tributaries such as Morosi and allied Thembu. A force of some 7,000 men attacked Makosane, the village of Sekonyela's brother 'Mota. The Batlokwa regiments were defeated, their herds were driven away while their crops and huts were burned. After destroying the village of Nkhahle, Moshoeshoe's army advanced on Sekonyela's stronghold at Marabeng and that of his son Maketekete at Jwalaboholo. Sekonyela made a peace offering and Moshoeshoe accepted it. The Batlokwa had lost almost 50 men killed and most of their cattle. Moshoeshoe had offered Sekonyela an alliance in the face of increasing Boer and British encroachment. Fearful of becoming his subordinate Sekonyela refused.

== Defeat and death ==
After the Battle of Berea on 20 December 1852, Taaibosch and Sekonyela attacked the Bataung of Tolo in Winburg and the Kgolokwe under Witsie in the Harrismith District. In the battle of Khoro-e-Betloa against the Basotho, which ensued towards the end of 1853 (between October and November), Taaibosch was killed at Dawidsberg. After the death of Taaibosch, the Basotho army overwhelmed the Batlokwa and drove Sekonyela out of Jwalaboholo. Following that defeat, Sekonyela fled to Winburg with very few of his people. The bulk of his people joined Moshoeshoe I; and others relocated to the Eastern Cape with a small portion fleeing north to integrate with Batswana. He later moved to a plot given by George Russell Clerk – at Wittenberg Reserve in the Herschel District of Eastern Cape. Sekonyela died on 20 July 1856.

According to oral traditions recorded by his great-grandson, Felix Maketekete Sekonyela, Sekonyela had seven wives who bore him children and several more who did not. Foreign visitors were unanimous in their unfavourable descriptions of Sekonyela. This was owing partly to his persecution of Christian converts, three of whom he had personally executed on accusations of witchcraft. Modern day Batlokwa refer to Sekonyela as bohale meaning fierce or angry, due to his propensity for anger and the poor treatment he meted to his followers.
