= T. W. D. Mohapi =

Sesotho author, poet, and folklorist

Tsietsi Winston Dennis Mohapi was born in 1951 and is a South African Sesotho author, poet, folklorist, dramatist, and translator. He is known for his extensive contribution to Sesotho literature through poetry, prose, drama, folklore, and language development texts. His work has played a significant role in the preservation, promotion, and teaching of the Sesotho language.

== Biography ==
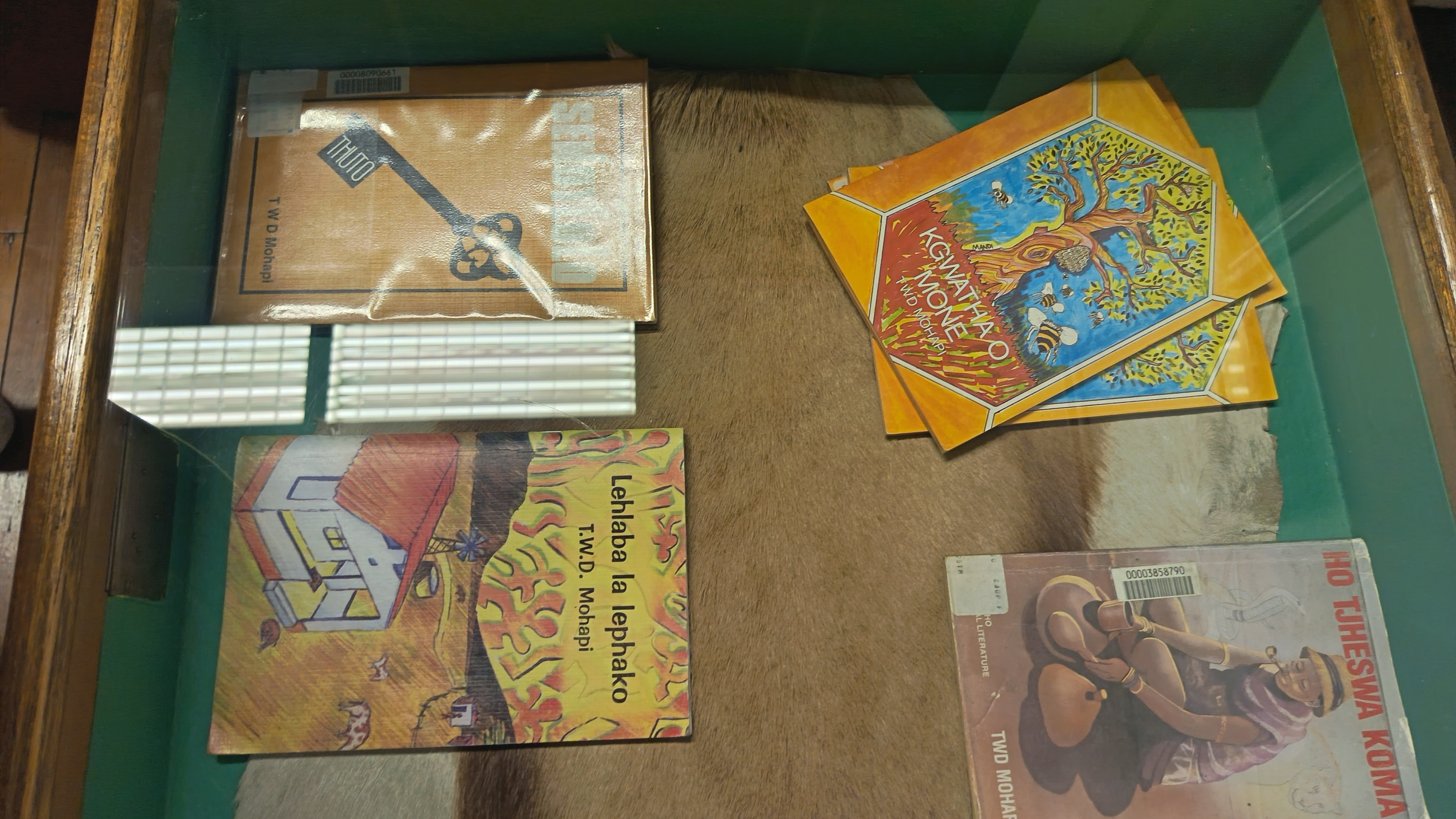
Books by T.W.D Mohapi at Dingolweng, Sesotho Literary Museum

Mohapi grew up in a family that loved education; his father was the first headmaster at Herschel, Mehlomakhulu Secondary, while he attended Standard 2 in Price Mbethe Primary School.

He emerged as a prominent Sesotho writer in the late 20th century and has since produced a wide body of literary and educational work. His writings often draw on oral traditions, rural life, social realities, and linguistic heritage.

Mohapi has been recognized for his contribution to the development of Sesotho literature, particularly in the Free State province.

== Literary career ==
Mohapi has written across multiple genres, including poetry, short stories, novels, drama, folklore collections, and instructional language texts. Many of his works are used in educational contexts and are valued for their role in documenting Sesotho idioms, proverbs, riddles, and traditional knowledge.

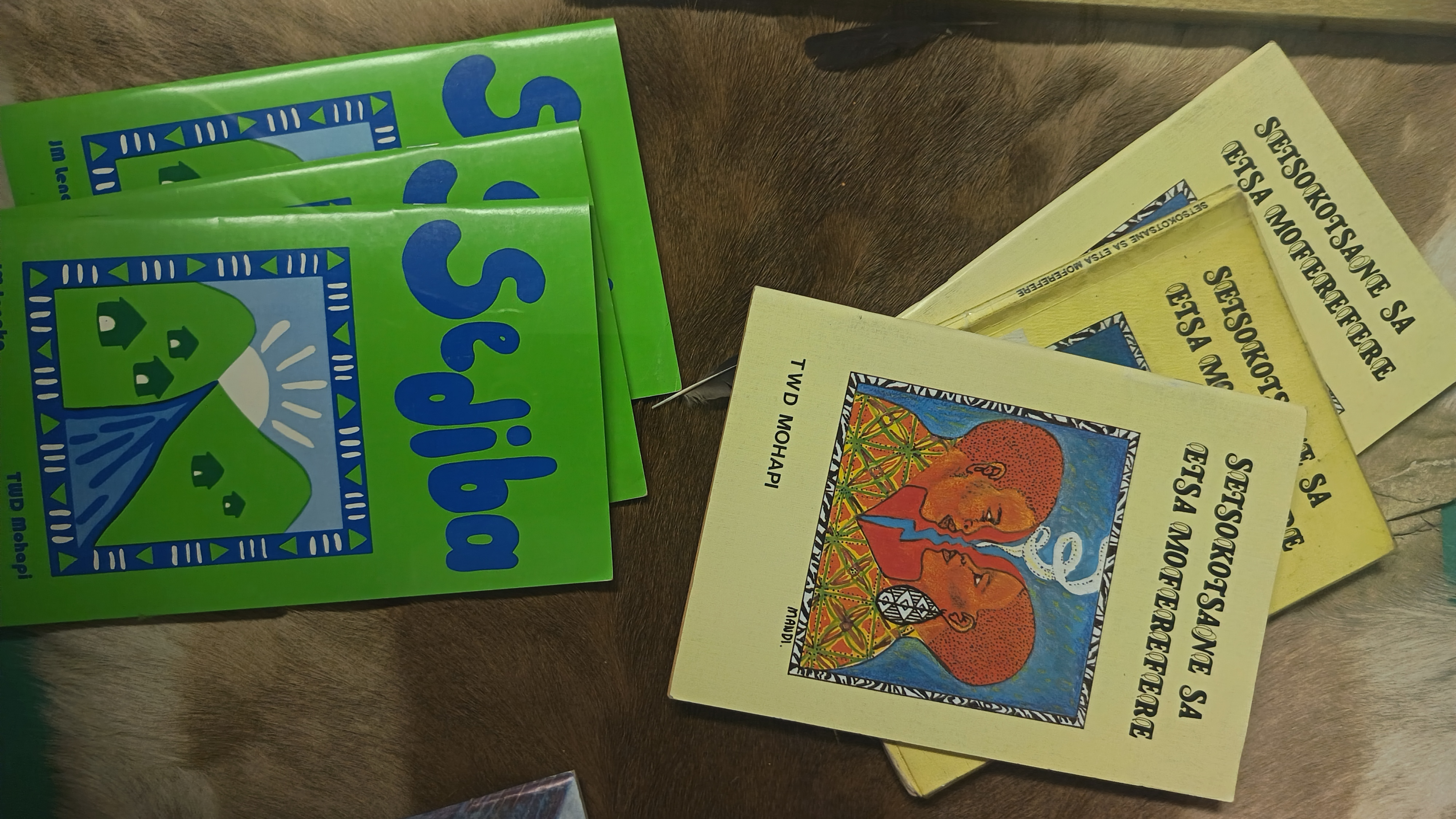
Dibuka tsa T.WD. Mohapi pokellong ya Dinglweng, Bloemfontein.

His writing is characterized by strong cultural grounding, moral reflection, and a commitment to language development.

=== Selected works ===
- Ho Tjheswa Koma (1988) – Folklore and moral tales
- Senotlolo (1990)—Poetry and poetic forms
- Setsokotsane sa etsa Moferefere (1992)—Short stories.
- Bophelo ba Ka (1992)—Poetry
- Leru le Lefubedu (1992) – Drama
- Lehlaba la Lephako (2002)—Novel on farm labour and social conditions.
- Bohlale ba Seholoholo—Folklore and traditional wisdom [4].
- Sediba – Cultural and linguistic reflections
- Kgwatha o Mone – Idioms and expressions
- Bofihla 1 – Riddles
- Menwana ya Ka—Language-related work
- Re Reng Ha Ba Re…? (2013)—English–Sesotho translation guide

== Awards and recognition ==
- Bophelo ba Ka—Winner of the Thomas Mokopu Mofolo Award
- Lehlaba la Lephako—Winner of the **M-NET Book Prize**
- Certificate of Honour (2002) for contribution to the development of Sesotho literature in the Free State

== Legacy ==
T. W. D. Mohapi is regarded as an important figure in modern Sesotho literature. His work continues to be referenced in literary studies and language development, and it contributes to the preservation of Sesotho oral and written traditions. Mohapi's work is kept in Dingolweng, the Sesotho Literary Museum in Bloemfontein, Free State Province of South Africa.
