= Clarens Arts Festival =

Arts festival in South Africa

- Noteworthy locations in Clarens Noteworthy locations in Clarens 1 Quillets; 2 Martie Lotz Hall; 3 Pottery Studio; 4 Titanic View; 5 Hotel; 6 Bakery; 7 Platform; 8 Village Square; 9 Charlie's; 10 Восса di Lupo; 11 Post House; 13 Methodist Church & Hall; 14 NG Church Hall; 15 Voetstoots; 16 Clarens Primary School; 17 Country Hotel; 18 Il Castello; 19 Golf Course Club House; 20 NG Kerk & Pastorie (af); 21 Bilbliophile bookshop 22 Clarens Museum (Closed) Clarens Arts Festival
- Genre: Arts Festival
- Dates: Autumn annually
- Location: Clarens
- Coordinates: 28.512°S 28.423°E
- Years active: 4
- Founded: 2022
- Website: clarensartsfestival.co.za

The Clarens Arts Festival is an annual multi lingual cultural gathering that draws artists, performers, authors, musicians and other creative individuals together. Founded in 2022, the event draws patrons, local literati and other creative minds to Clarens, a charming town in the Eastern Free State, in the eastern highlands. Afrikaans, English and SeSotho patrons sign up for book talks, performing and visual arts, a variety of workshops and a children's programme. Audiences have commented on the range of talent drawn from across the region.

== An annual event ==
Over its short history, the Festival has established itself as a popular event with a diverse programme, with a growth in numbers across the years.

Year	Workshops	Music & Theatre Events	Book Talks
2025	16	12	15
2024	6	5	6

=== 2026 Programme: 24 April - 27th April ===
- 2026 The fifth Clarens Arts Festival took place from 24th to 27th of April 2026
- 2025 The fourth Clarens Arts Festival took place from 1 - 4 May 2025.
- 2024 The third Clarens Arts Festival took place from 1 - 4 May 2024.
- 2023 The third Clarens Arts Festival took place from 27 April to 1 May 2023
- 2022 The first Clarens Arts Festival took place 29 April - 2 May 2022
