= Sethati =

Prince Sethati was the fifth son of King Tsotetsi who was the leader of Batlokwa ba Mokgalong in the mid-1700s, from which they trace their history. Sethati had three children namely Makume, Mokgitlinyane and Mankane. Sethati was born in the Nts'oana-Tsatsi, Tafelkop area in the Free State are and most of his descendants are in South Africa and Lesotho area.

== South Africa ==
In South Africa, the descendants of Sethati are found mostly in the Eastern Free State Area, namely in the Frankfort, Villiers, Tweeling, Cornelia, VERDE, Heidelberg and Qwa-Qwa area. Due to migrant labour, you find large groups of Sethati people in Gauteng area.

== Lesotho ==
In Lesotho, the Sethati clan is found in the Mokhotlong District, particularly in the Mapholaneng Village, which is some 250 km away from Maseru.
