= Tlôkwa people =

Southern African clan

Batlôkwa

Total population
- 670,000

Languages
- Northern Sotho (Setlôkwa)

Religion
- Christianity, African traditional religion

Related ethnic groups
- Lobedu people, Sotho people, Tswana people, Pulana people, Lozi people, Kgalagadi people, Pedi people, and other Sotho-Tswana peoples

Tlôkwa
- Person: Motlôkwa
- People: Batlôkwa
- Language: Setlôkwa
- Country: Botlôkwa

The term Batlôkwa (also Batlokoa, or Badogwa) refers to several Kgatla communities that reside in Botswana, Lesotho and South Africa.

It comprises the followers of Tlôkwa kings and the members of clans identified as Tlôkwa, or individuals who identify themselves as of Tlôkwa descent. Most of the Batlôkwa clans trace their royal lineages to Kgwadi son of King Tabane, who was the father and founder of the Batlokwa nation. The Tlôkwa considers the Tlokwe-cat as their original totem which has since become extinct due to over-hunting for its fur, which was used by clan chiefs.

== Classification ==
The Batlôkwa kingdom is part of the larger group of Bakgatla people, which is one of sub-divisions of the Bantu-speaking Tswana peoples. These different groups are often classified for convenience as 'Sotho-Tswana'. This is because, from an early stage of their history, they shared a number of linguistic and cultural characteristics that distinguished them from other Bantu-speakers of southern Africa. Most prominent was mutually intelligible dialects. Other features included totemism, preferential marriage of maternal cousins with the exception to Batlôkwa who prefer marrying their paternal cousins, and an architectural style characterized by a round hut with a conical thatch roof supported by wooden pillars on the outside. Other commonalities included a style skin cloaks called mekgatlha, dense and close village settlements larger than those of 'Nguni' peoples, and a tradition of building in stone in less grassy or wooded regions.

The history of the Basotho and Batswana people is one of continual dissension and fission where disputes, sometimes over kingship ascendancy, resulted in a section of the clan breaking away from the main clan, under the leadership of a dissatisfied king's relative, and settling elsewhere. Often the name of the man who led the splinter group was taken as the new tribe's name.

The traditions of the Batswana people point to a northward origin, and indicate that their southward movement was part of the great migrations of the Bantu-speaking iron-age peoples. Usually, the theory asserts that the Sotho-Tswana separated from other Bantu-speaking peoples in the vicinity of the Great Lakes of East Africa, and that they proceeded downwards along the western part of present-day Zimbabwe.

Some scholars caution against this classification of ethnic groupings since Africans are not homogeneous peoples. Paul Maylam stressed that there is a common tendency for the criteria used to label African groups "to overlap between 'different' societies so that it becomes virtually impossible to use all the major criteria at the same time to define nearly differing, self-contained entities."

== History ==
Following the death of Masilo there was a leadership crisis that resulted in the formation of the Hurutshe and Kwena clans. The Batlôkwa claim lineage from the Hurutshe clan and traced their early ancestry to Mokgatla, the founder of the BaKgatla and Tabane.

Tabane fathered a son Matlaisane from his senior wife and five sons by his junior wife, Diale, Kgetsi, Kgwadi (Motlôkwa), Matsibolo, and Mosia. Each broke away to form Bapedi, Makgolokwe, Batlôkwa, Maphuthing and Basia respectively. Ten generations later, from Kgwadi, Montwedi, the son of Motonosi, fathered Mokotjo. Chief Mokotjo the father to Sekonyela died at an early age, so his mother, Manthatisi, was regent during his minority.

=== Kgosi-kgolo Tsotetsi ===
Kgosi-kgolo Tsotetsi (ca. 1735) was the paramount king of Batlôkwa ba Mokgalong, which was a senior branch of Batlokwa. He took over the reins after his father, Kgosi Seboloka, son of Mokgalo, died and he also, like most of the earlier chiefs, died at an early age, however by then he had already bore 6 sons by his Kgosihadi 'Mamohlahlwe, namely Mohlahlwe (Lebaka), Tsibela, Selemane, Leloka, Sethati and Thai. At the time of his death, his successor Mohlahlwe was still a minor, and Batlokwa made a consensus that Queen Mamohlahlwe becomes regent for his son Lebaka. This, therefore, made her the first queen to act as a regent in the Batlokwa nation. Kgosihadi Mamohlahlwe was greatly assisted by her late husband's siblings, namely Khanye son of Thekiso and Motonosi son of Makoro. These chiefs assisted very well in the chieftainship of Batlokwa until Queen Mamohlahlwe gave way to her son Lebaka who then became the paramount king of Batlokwa.

=== Kgosihadi Manthatisi, wife of Kgosi Mokotjo ===
Kgosihadi Manthatisi (ca. 1781–1836) was one of the best known, and most feared, women military and political leaders of the early 19th century. In the years of wars, migrations, and state-formation often referred to as the Mfecane or Difaqane, the Tlôkwa people were first known in English as the Mantatees, after Manthatisi's name, in the literature of exploration, missions and empire.

Kgosihadi Manthatisi, the daughter of Chief Mothaba of the Basia people who were a sibling nation of Batlôkwa, in what later became the Harrismith (Thaba Ntshu) district of the Free State province of South Africa, was reportedly a tall, attractive woman. She married Mokotjo, the chief of the neighboring Batlôkwa, in a typical dynastic alliance, and is said to have borne him four sons. Mokotjo died while the heir, Sekonyela, was still too young to assume the chieftaincy, so Manthatisi acted as regent for Sekonyela.

After Mokotjo's death the Batlôkwa ba Mokotleng faced military encroachments by the amaHlubi people who were fleeing their homes in neighboring Natal. Made refugees themselves, Manthatisi who was then a Regent for her son Sekonyela commanded the Tlôkwa into the Caledon valley, driving out other Sotho communities living there. Her troops seized the crops and cattle of the people they attacked, leaving a trail of destruction and devastation.

Her reign of military conquest extended as far as central modern day Botswana. At the height of her military and political power her army was estimated to contain forty thousand fighters. However, she eventually suffered a series of defeats beginning in Bechuanaland in January 1823. Peter Becker describes the developments during this period when he stated that:

"Meanwhile Mmanthatisi was approaching with forty thousand men, women and children. It was January 1823, the time of the year crops were ripening and food was usually plentiful. But the Wild Cat People were compelled to live frugally, for so great had been the chaos brought about by difaqane/difetlwane in general and the plundering of Mmanthatisi, Mpangazita and Matiwane in particular that entire tribes had vanished from their settlements even before they had tilled their fields in preparation for planting. Indeed, the Central Plateau swarmed with hunger-stricken stragglers and small, detached parties of bandits. Apart from roots, bulbs and berries, there was little food to be found in the veld, certainly not enough to feed so large a horde as that of Mmanthatisi."

Nonetheless, the most prosperous of the Botswana chiefs, Makaba of the Bangwaketsi, made a firm decision not to surrender to Mmanthatisi without a struggle. Becker, described this in detail:

"Meanwhile, the old Chief had decided not to surrender to Mmanthatisi without a fight. He called up every available warrior, garrisoned every pass leading to his capital, and with the guile for which he was famous, prepared traps into which he planned to lead his aggressors.

"Since her flight from the Harrismith (Thaba Ntshu) district Mmanthatisi had managed to brush aside all opposition in the territories she traversed, but now in the stifling bushveld of Botswana, she was to come face to face with a foe whose fighting forces were as numerous as, and also better fed than, those of the Wild Cat People. The vanguard of Mmanthatisi's army strode into ambuscades; large groups of men topped headlong into concealed pitfalls and met their death beneath volleys of barbed javelins. A battle broke out, in the course of which hundreds of the invaders were massacred. Before the situation could develop into a rout Mmanthatisi suddenly disengaged her armies and retreated with her hordes to the east. Thus Makaba became the first "Sotho" chief to repulse the formidable BaTlokwa (Wild Cat) Army, and to this day he is spoken of as the 'Man of Conquest.'"

Because of Manthatisi's notoriety, all Sotho-Tswana raiders became known as “boo-Mmanthatisi”, or “Mantatee Horde” by the English. Known also as the “Destroyer of Nations”, she was only stopped from entering the Cape Colony by British Forces near Aliwal North. Eventually Manthatisi settled her people on the Marabeng Mountains.

After Mmanthatisi's son Sekonyela reached maturity he took control of the baTlôkwa social structures and military.

=== Kgosi Sekonyela ===
Kgosi Sekonyela was born in 1804 near Harrismith next to the Wilge River. His mother sent him away from the Tlôkwa to protect him from political rivals. He rejoined the Tlôkwa in 1824, after his mother had led the Batlôkwa during the early Difaqane/difetlwane wars. Amidst the social and political chaos which gripped the present Free State and Lesotho regions, Sekonyela continued to build the Tlôkwa into a major military power. When the worst phase of the wars ended in the early 1830s, he settled on the naturally fortified mountains near the Caledon River.

Kgosi Sekonyela's major rival for control of northern Lesotho was Moshoeshoe, the founder of the Basotho kingdom. For twenty years the two rivals raided each other and competed for adherents from among the many refugee bands in the region. Moshoeshoe – much the better diplomatist – gradually outstripped Sekonyela in numbers of supporters. In November, 1853 Moshoeshoe attacked and defeated Batlôkwa ba Mokotleng which Sekonyela fled to Winburg for asylum. After this defeat the people under Sekonyela disintegrated, some fled to Lesotho where they were absorbed into Moshoeshoe's state, others to Eastern Cape with a substation portion fleeing north to present Tshwane region in Gauteng.

Sekonyela later obtained land in the Herschel district of the Eastern Cape where he died in 1856.

Kgosi Sekonyela's downfall is commonly attributed to his personal defects. His love of war alienated his neighbours while his rough treatment alienated his own people. On the other hand, Moshoeshoe's rise to power was attributed to his love of peace and to his benevolence.

== Geography ==
The Batlôkwa clans reside in Botswana, Lesotho and South Africa; it is not known how many Batlôkwa there are since no census has been done.

=== South Africa ===
We recognize the late king Lesala as the last paramount king to have led the Batlokoa Ba Mokgalong, who was subsequently assassinated by the British colony for his 9000 cattle and for negotiating for a settlement to share his land.

In South Africa, the Batlôkwa are found in significant numbers in six of the provinces, namely North West, Gauteng, Limpopo and the Free State, KwaZulu-Natal and Eastern Cape.

In the Free State, the Batlokwa were given land between Frankfort,Tweeling ,Reitz ,Mamafubedu and the whole of Nketoana for their role in the Free State Wars where they assisted the Boers.

In the North West the Batlôkwa settled in the region called Tlôkwe near Potchefstroom. Batlôkwa are also found at Molatedi Village (Kgosi Matlapeng), Letlhakeng-Montsana Village (Kgosi Sedumedi), Tlokweng Village (Kgosi Motsatsi). They are part of the Setswana language grouping of the Sotho–Tswana. They arrived in the area in the 1820s and are not part of the Batlôkwa who had been led by Kgosi Sekonyela, as they had seceded at an earlier period. There is also scattering of the Batlôkwa found all over the North West Province.

In the Limpopo province, they are found in a place called boTlôkwa, north of Polokwane. Here the Batlôkwa are part of the North-Sotho language grouping. They arrived in the region after separating from the Batlôkwa who had fled to the Tshwane region after the defeat of Sekonyela by Moshoeshoe. The main Tlôkwa clan in the area is the Batlôkwa Ba Ga Machaka and Ramokgopa. The two had separated in a quarrel for chieftaincy, with Ramokgopa ultimately residing in the eastern regions called Mokomene, in Limpopo. Another grouping under Kgosi Manthata was moved to Mohodi next to Senwabarwana in 1977 also as a result of chieftaincy quarrels with Batlôkwa ba Mphakane under Kgosi Machaka.

These areas produced important people such as:

- Collins Ramusi
- Tumelo Mokoena
- Tlou wa Raophala
- Hugh Masekela
- Gwen Ramokgopa
- Kgosiyentsho Ramokgopa
- Matome Zakea Seima, a writer, publisher and lawyer
- Kgalamadi Ramusi
- Babsy Selela
- Mamphela Ramphele, Lehotlo Moshokoa, Caiphus Semenya
- Justice Bess Motsatsi-Nkabinde (retired Judge of the Constitutional Court of RSA)
- Maropene Ramokgopa

In the Sesotho language grouping, the Batlôkwa are mainly found in the Eastern Free State region which is their area of jurisdiction with seven distinct Batlôkwa branches in the area, namely

- Batlôkwa ba Mokgalong (Tsotetsi)
- Batlôkwa ba Mota
- Batlôkwa ba Morakadu
- Batlôkwa ba Makalakeng
- Batlôkwa ba Nasatse Patso
- Batlôkwa ba Lehana
- Batlôkwa ba Masene

The above-mentioned branches of Batlôkwa still share similar cultural and linguistic elements in their respective areas. Batlokwa ba Mokgalong also known as Batlokwa ba Tsotetsi trace their descendency to Modungwane who was popularly known as Molefe who is the father of all the branches of Batlôkwa. Batlokwa ba Mokgalong are recognised by the Free State House of Traditional Leaders, and are still struggling to acquire back their land which was stolen by the colonialists under the then Black Administration Act, to be returned in 1991, with the recognition of Paramount Chief Lebaka David Tsotetsi. After the death of Chief Lebaka, his son Nkgahle Bert Tsotetsi took over, and mysteriously became recognised as a Senior Traditional Leader instead of his initial status of a Paramount Chief, in what seemed to be a political cover-up of the senior house of the Batlôkwa nation.

In KwaZulu-Natal, Batlôkwa are found in the Nqutu Municipality in a place called Maseseng, Mokgalong; which is named after Chief Lesesa who settled there in the late 1800s after the British requested assistance in the form of warriors from King Leteka of the Batlokwa ba Mokgalong. Leteka in response sent through his junior brother, Prince Lesesa, with his warriors, who joined the Batlokwa ba Mota who had already settled in the Nqutu area with the Hlubi, and together they succeeded in winning the battle and subsequently capturing King Cetshwayo of the Zulus. In return, the British signed a treaty with Batlôkwa to reside in the area, however as it was custom for the senior house to rule, Lesesa was supposed to be the leader of Batlôkwa in the area, however, he made an agreement with Mota to let him rule, as they had already been there before him and his people. Lesesa also played a pivotal role in the struggle to acquire land back from the colonialists, and in 1905 he was joined by Josiah Tshangana Gumede (ca. 1867–1946) and King Moloi of the Makgolokwe Tribe, who went to England in order to deliver a petition to the British Government, in order to try to acquire land back that was taken away from them before the Anglo-Boer War.

In the Eastern Cape, Batlôkwa are found in the Herschel and Mount Fletcher area under Chief Kakudi and Lehana respectively.

=== Lesotho ===
In Lesotho the Batlôkwa are one of the three main Sotho-Tswana clans who speak Sesotho. Their current Leader being Kgosi Ntjaqetho Sekonyela of Tlokoeng Mokhotlong District.

=== Botswana ===
Batlôkwa arrived in Botswana in 1887, settling in Moshwaneng on the Notwane River, after being led by Kgosi Gaborone from the Tshwane area in South Africa following the split with another Tlôkwa clan that went to settle in Batlôkwa north of Polokwane-Pietersburg. The land they settled in was given to them by Kgosi Sechele after they acknowledged the overlordship of the Bakwena. The capital of Botswana, Gaborone, is named after Kgosi Gaborone.

The Batlôkwa in Botswana are unique from the other Tlôkwa clans in that their totem is the thakadu (ant-bear). This totem was chosen after the Batlôkwa were in the wilderness and became thirsty and hungry. They found a catch of the daywater from the many holes dug by thakadu, which has been the totem since that time. Batlôkwa then started drinking from such holes and since then they decided that nobody should harm the ant bear and it must be protected at all costs.

During this time in the wilderness, Mmakgosi was expecting a child and after drinking water from one of the dugout holes, she gave birth to a son who was named Marakadu. She said that Marakadu was named after the thakadu - the saviour, adding that since then Batlôkwa agreed to change their totem from nkwe to thakadu and that is how they became dithakadu as they are known today. Marakadu then begot a son called Mosima, a hole dug by thakadu from which they obtained water. Mosima then begot a son called Motlhabane - who begot Mokgwa - a savanna shrub under which Mmakgosi delivered. Mokgwa then begot Taukobong. The name was chosen because there were no blankets and they opted for animal skins to keep warm. According to Kgosintwa, Taukobong had three sons from different wives named Makaba, Molefe, and Tshekiso. He said that this was the time when Batlôkwa were at Itlholanoga - the snake eye, near Rustenburg. While Makaba died without children, however he had engaged a woman called Nkae and to keep the royal lineage growing, Molefe from the second wife was called in to father children for Nkae. Molefe then bore three sons in the house of Makaba, namely Bogatsu, Phiri and Semele. Traditionally, the children were not his but his elder brothers Makaba. Molefe became the regent chief because Taukobong died while they were still young. However, when they had matured, Phiri suggested to his brother Bogatsu that they should take over the chieftainship from Molefe, this created enmity between the two with Phiri constantly plotting to kill Molefe. He said that sensing danger, Bogatsu then instructed Molefe to choose two of his favourite wards and ran away. In his determination to kill Molefe, he said, Phiri pursued and attacked Molefe but it was Phiri who was defeated and killed. Molefe did not return to Itlholanoga but continued with the journey until they arrived in Botswana where they asked for land to settle on from Kgosi Sechele of the Bakwena.

== Culture ==
The Batlôkwa share similar customs and tradition as other Sotho-Tswana clans. Depending on the area that they live in the speak normally one three languages which are Setswana, Sesotho or Northern Sotho but mostly speak Sesotho. Sesotho, Northern Sotho and Setswana are largely mutually intelligible. Like most Africans, the Batlôkwa are adapting to a rapidly urbanising population and culture. In rural areas, traditional culture remains an important force in daily life. Customary law still plays a vital role, and their unique culture of marrying their paternal cousins. In each region's urban areas, which are cosmopolitan, multi-racial and multi-cultural, western cultural norms are predominant.

== Leboko la Batlokwa (Batlokwa Poem) ==
Ke mafifitswana a go rekwa ka kgomo

Mafeta kgomo a je motho

Ba ga Mmanakana-a-Mosima

Ba ga Mmanakana-di-ganong

Ba ga mosi mmolaya moapei

Moapeelwana a sale a lela

Ba ga Nkwenyana-a-Nkwe o apereng?

Nkwe ke apere tau
