= Sefikeng =

Town in Lesotho

Coordinates: 29°16′44″S 27°48′28″E

Sefikeng is a town in western Lesotho, located 30 kilometres to the east of the capital, Maseru, and 15 kilometres south of Teyateyaneng.
