= Clarens, South Africa =

Clarens
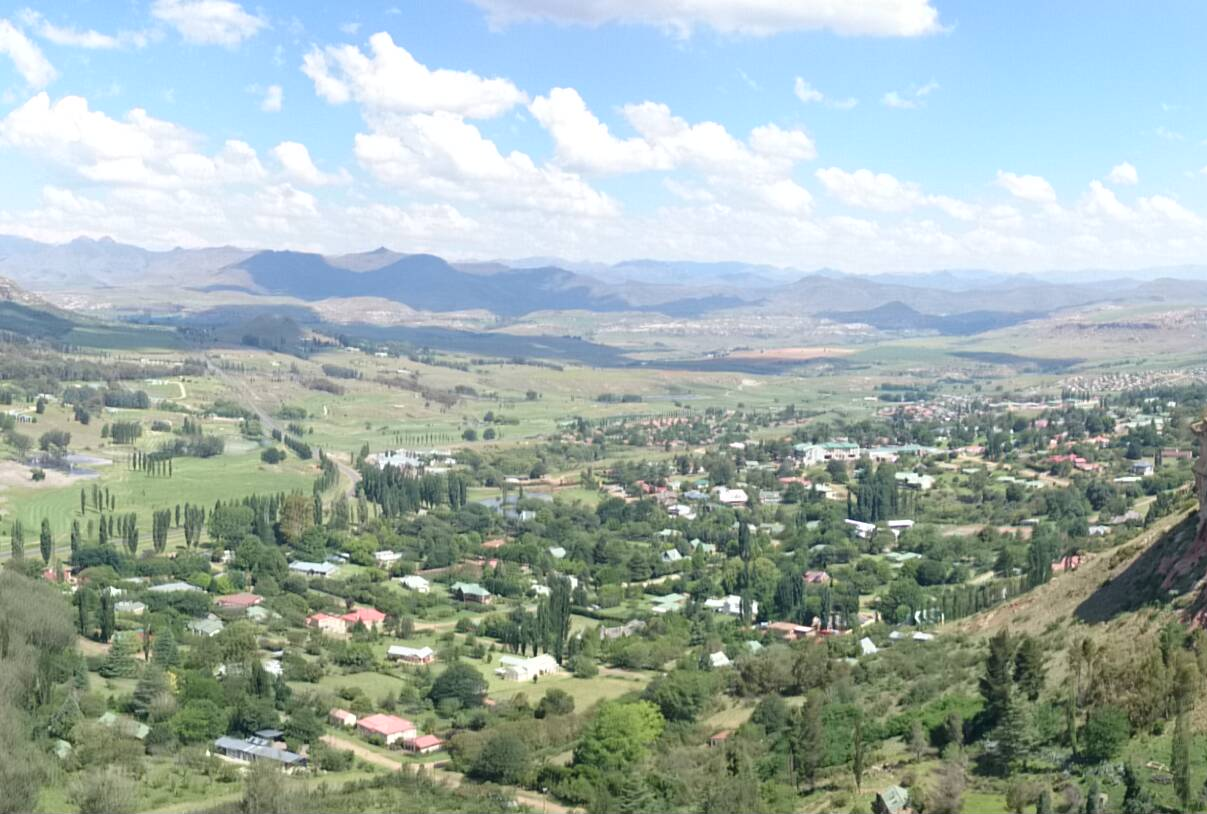
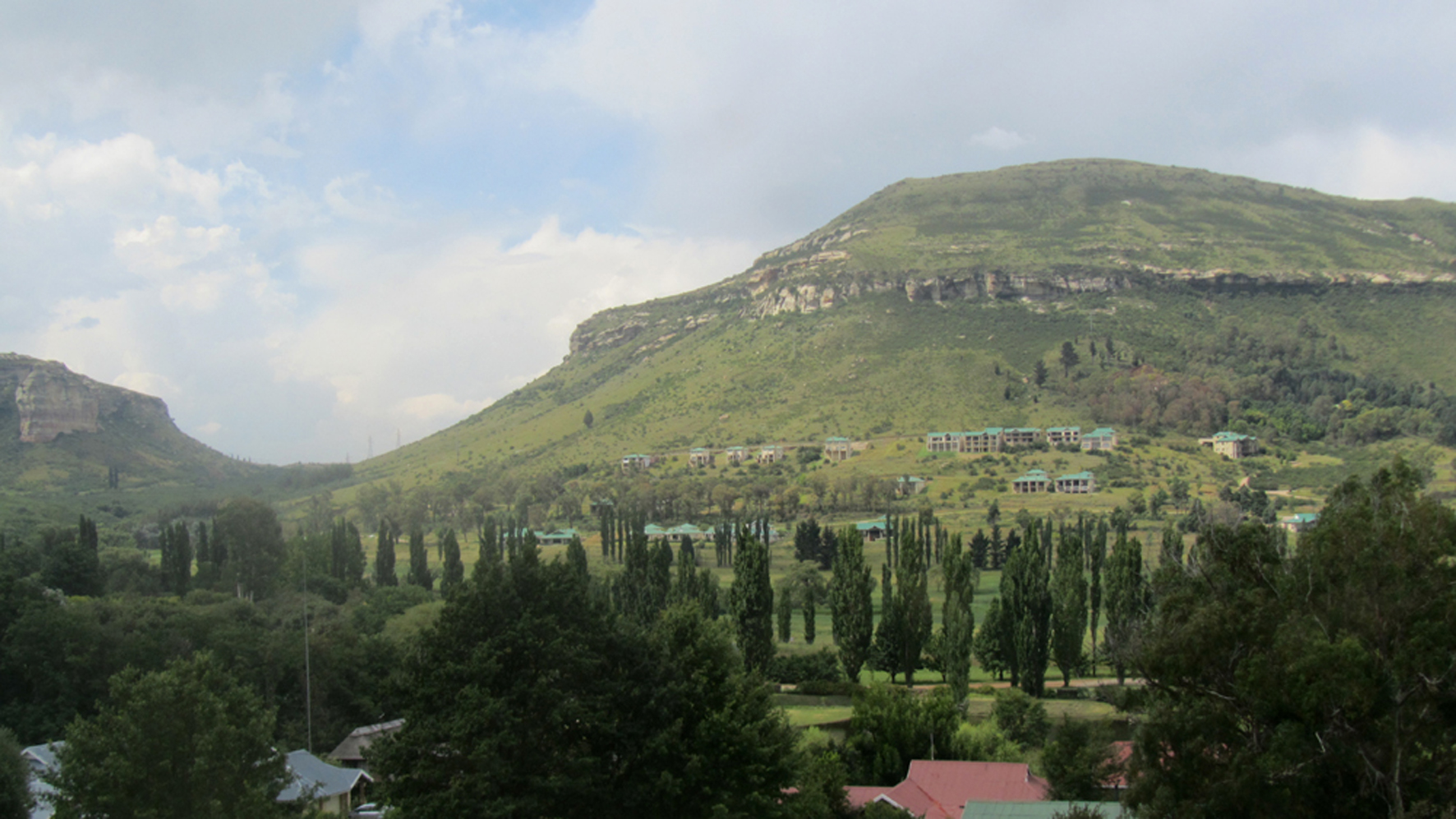
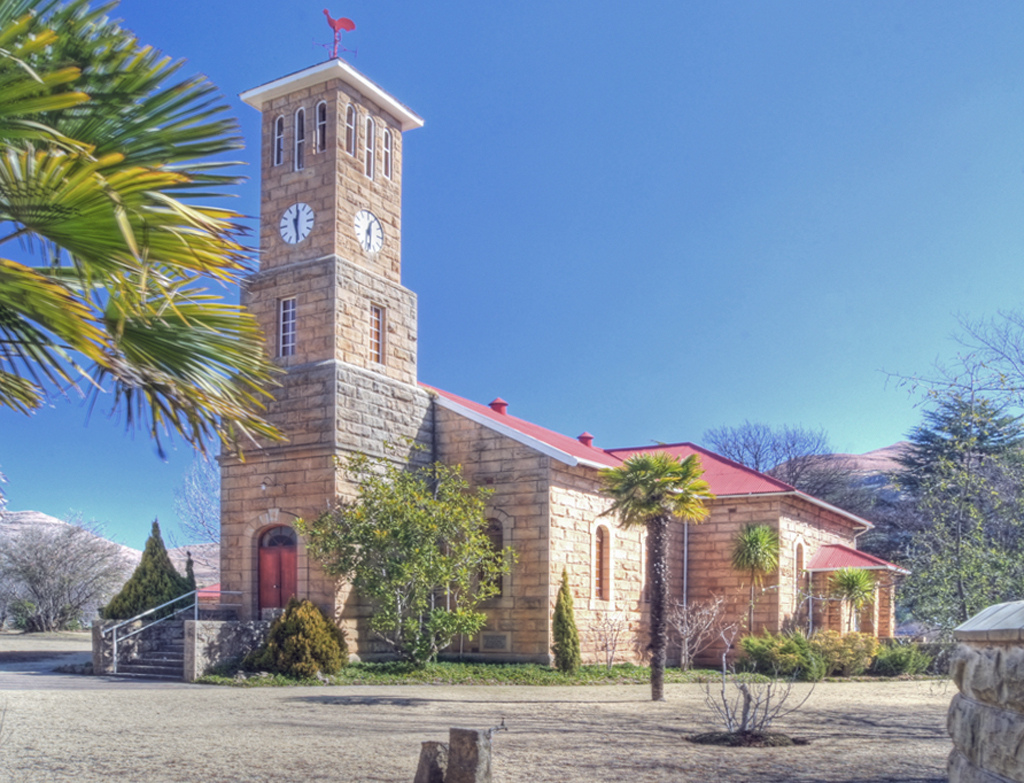
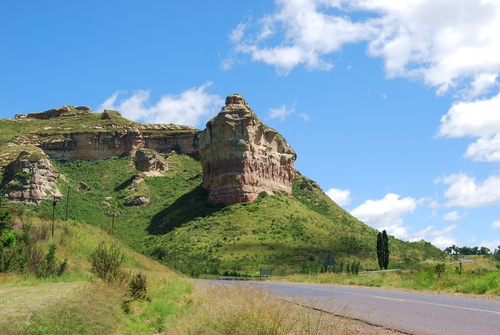
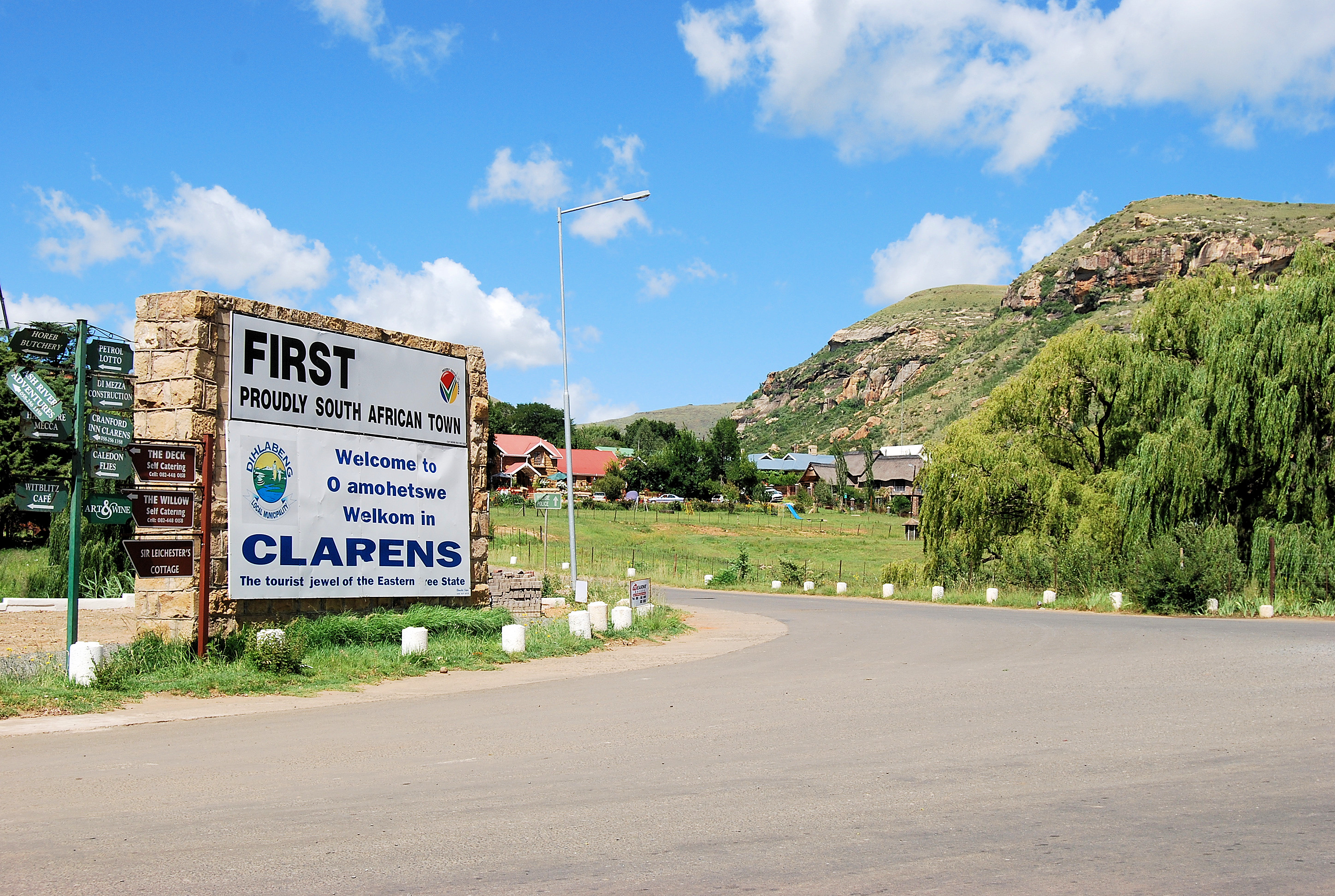
- Clockwise from top: View of Clarens, NG Church, Welcome Sign, Titanic Rock, Mountain ranges at Clarens

- Location within Free State (South African province) Location within South Africa Location within Africa
- Coordinates: 28°31′S 28°25′E
- Country: South Africa
- Province: Free State
- District: Thabo Mofutsanyane
- Municipality: Dihlabeng

Government
  - Type: Municipality
  - Mayor: Tjhetane Mofokeng (ANC)

Area
  - Total: 13.7 km^{2} (5.3 sq mi)
- Elevation: 1,874 m (6,148 ft)

Population (2011)
  - Total: 751
  - Density: 54.8/km^{2} (142/sq mi)

Racial makeup (2011)
  - White: 58.32%
  - Black African: 34.09%
  - Coloured: 4.13%
  - Indian/Asian: 3.20%
  - Other: 0.27%

First languages (2011)
  - English: 44.02%
  - Afrikaans: 46.37%
  - Sotho: 7.05%
  - Other: 2.56%
- Time zone: UTC+2 (SAST)
- Postal code (street): 9707
- PO box: 9707
- Area code: 058

Clarens is a scenic small town situated in the foothills of the Maluti Mountains in the Free State province of South Africa and nicknamed the "Jewel of the Eastern Free State". It was established in 1912 and named after the town of Clarens in Switzerland where exiled Paul Kruger spent his last days. It is situated 336 km from Johannesburg, 284 km from Bloemfontein, 389 km from Durban, and is a popular weekend tourist destination.

== History ==
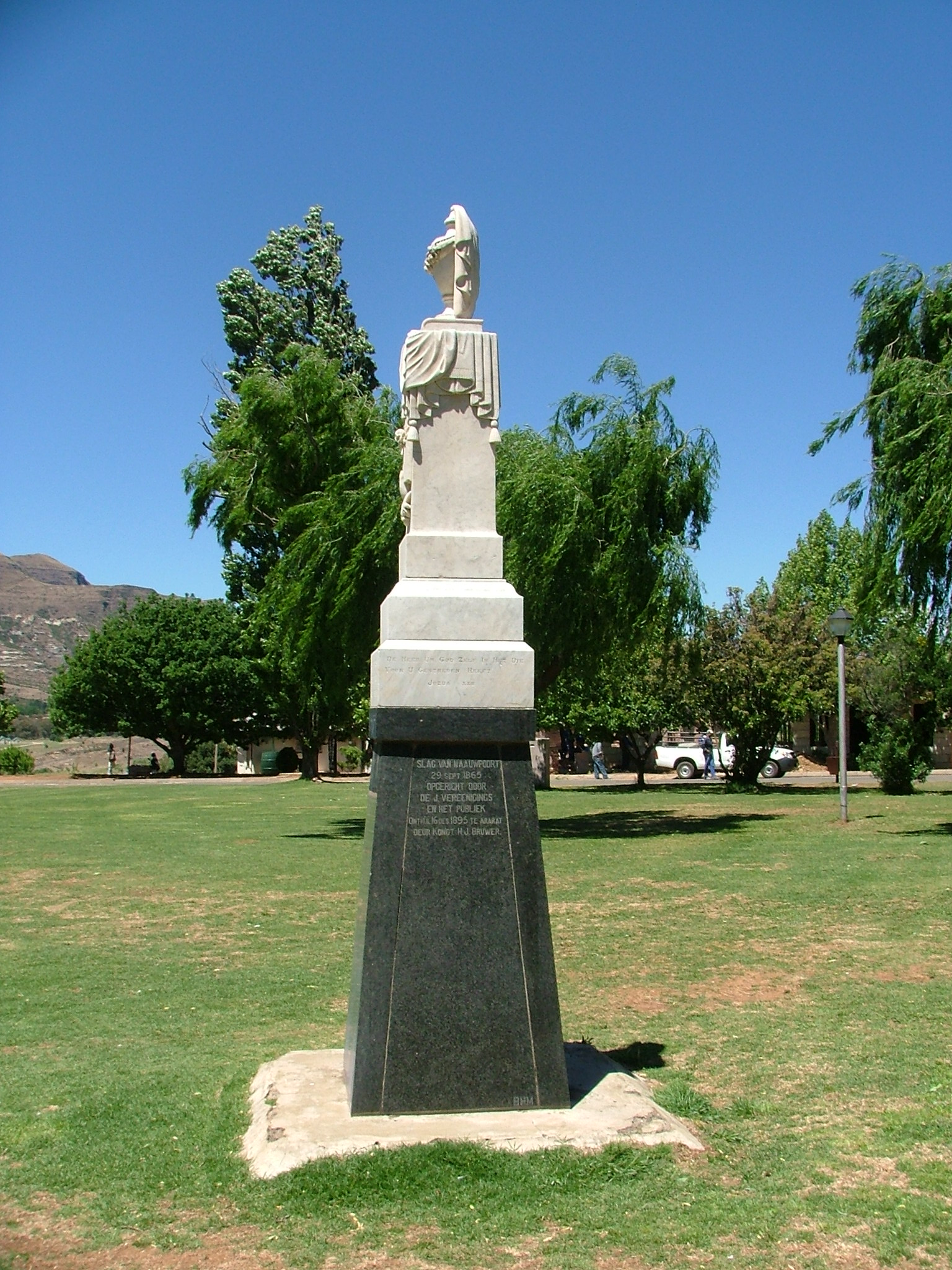
Naauwpoort monument

A farm called "Leliehoek" (English: Lily Corner) was bought from Hermanus Steyn in 1910, and in 1911 Piet de Villiers sold his farm "Naauwpoort" (situated near the Titanic rock) to a company that planned to establish a village there. These two farms were divided into stands and sold for fifty pounds each.

A commission was appointed in 1912 to finalise negotiations, and a decision was made to name the village "Clarens" in honour of President Paul Kruger’s influence in the area. This came about in the following way - during the Free State-Basotho War of 1865 - 1866, five burghers (citizens) of the Transvaal were murdered in the Eastern Free State, and as a result war was declared against the Basotho leader, Moshoeshoe.

Paul Kruger, together with a commando of burghers, defeated the Basotho at the Battle of Naauwpoortnek (near Titanic rock). President Kruger spent his last days as a voluntary exile in the attractive village of Clarens in Switzerland, and thus Clarens was named for this Swiss town. A monument was erected on the farm "Ararat" just outside Clarens, in honour of the five burghers murdered by the Basotho on 29 September 1865, during the siege of Naauwpoort. This monument was later moved to Clarens and placed in the central town square, where it stands to this day.

== Neighbourhoods and estates ==
Clarens is centred on the Clarens Town Square, the hub for shops, galleries, markets and events. The village residential areas immediately surrounding are often referred to as Uptown on the hillside and Downtown on the lower slopes. Neighbourhoods include the Swartland, the valley region that was historically a vlei (marshy wetland); Kloof, also a founding neighbourhood situated against the mountainside near Kloof Dam; and The Ridge, a quiet hillside area with views. Immediately adjoining Clarens to the south is Kgubetswana, an urban township.

Surrounding Clarens are several private estates: the Clarens Golf & Leisure Estate includes an 18‑hole golf course; Clarens Mountain Estate on the hills above the village retains indigenous vegetation and scenery; and the Sandstone Gorge Estate nestled in a sandstone valley at the foot of a nearby hill.

=== Clarens Nature Reserve ===
The Clarens Village Conservancy (CVC) manages the scenic Clarens Village Nature Reserve surrounding the town which boasts scenic walking and hiking trails, including a wheelchair friendly nature trail. Permits are required for hiking, mountain biking and fishing, and proceeds are used for conservation and the maintenance of the reserve’s way‑marked trails. The network includes routes such as the Dam & Kloof Walks, Clarens Mountain Trail, Porcupine Trail, Caracal Contour, Sky Contour and Titanic Trail, with main access points at the CVC gate in Hill Street, Berg Str entrance, and at the end of Ridge Road.

=== Mountain surrounds ===
Clarens is part of the scenic Highlands Route and is surrounded by mountains. The Rooiberge is the range encompassing the village, while further towards the southeast are the Maluti mountains often depicted in shades of purple and blue. All around are the sandstone cliffs with their multi-coloured layers - these horizontal strata are a characteristic feature of the area. Many homes in the Clarens Valley are made from or clad in sandstone.

The Golden Gate Highlands National Park with its sandstone formations and cliffs is 17 km from Clarens.

Close to Clarens is the outlet from the Lesotho Highlands Water Project that brings fresh water from Lesotho to feed into the As River (Afrikaans for "axle" because a wagon broke its axle when crossing, but has been mistakenly translated into English as "ash"), Liebenbergsvlei and Wilge Rivers feed into the Vaal Dam. Water from the Vaal Dam is then abstracted, treated and pumped to the Rand Water supply area.

== Tourism ==
Clarens is considered to be a writers and artists' haven. Art galleries are scattered around the square and the town. The village ambience combined with scenic views and climate has made Clarens a getaway for city dwellers as well as visitors from the surrounding areas. They are drawn to Clarens' sandstone mountains and seasonal climate; known as one of the more picturesque town spots in South Africa.

=== Accommodation and activities ===
There are various establishments offering accommodation, including bed & breakfasts, self-catering, lodges, backpackers and farm guest houses in the surrounding area. Many restaurants, pubs and tourist shops surround the central Clarens town square, often with live music performed on weekends. Activities in the vicinity include mountain biking, horse riding, abseiling, hiking, fly-fishing, fossil hunting, white-water rafting and golf. Various cheese farms, breweries and lodges may be found in the close surrounds.

=== Annual events ===
Clarens hosts several recurring events that contribute to local tourism and welcome visitors from all parts of the country.

The Clarens Craft Beer Festival founded in 2011 is typically held around February or March on the Village Square and features South African craft breweries, food stalls and live music.

The Titanic Challenge Trail Run is an annual trail‑running event over multiple distances on mountain trails around Titanic Rock and the Clarens Nature Reserve; proceeds support the Clarens Village Conservancy.

The Clarens Arts Festival is a curated annual programme of performances, exhibitions and workshops, typically staged in late April, early May with events on and around the Square.

Clarens also serves as a stop on the go2berg mountain‑bike stage race that passes through the town en route to the Drakensberg. The town hosts riders and supporter at the finish of the arduous 116 km “Boss Stage” (Day 3 of the race).

== Climate ==
Clarens has a temperate highland climate with marked seasonal variation and annual precipitation of around 750mm - 850mm p.a. with rainfall concentrated in summers. Clarens experiences more pronounced seasonal contrasts than many parts of the country. Summers are warm and often lush with afternoon thunderstorms, while winters bring cold, clear days with frosty nights and sparse vegetation.

== Dinosaur fossils ==
Large Jurassic dinosaurs lived in the eastern part of Free State including Clarens about 200-million-years ago, when the giant southern super-continent, Gondwana, was still intact.

=== Discovery of fossils ===
From 12 January 2009 the remains of the largest dinosaurs ever to be found on South African soil were discovered in Clarens, a small town in Free State (province). Dr Jonah Choineire, a senior researcher at the Evolutionary Studies Institute, said the remains of the large creature were found between the border of Lesotho and South Africa just outside of Clarens.

The remains were discovered at a construction site of the Ingula Pump and Storage Scheme, developed by Eskom Holdings (Pty) Ltd. Gavin Anderson, the project archaeologist, together with Dr Gideon Groenewald, a geologist/palaeontologist, was requested to assist with the recording of fossil finds at the construction site. The sites of the excavations were inspected on a continuous basis during the excavation on 12 January 2009. Up to 2017, twenty five sites have been recorded, where fossilised bone were found. Remains of the vertebrates discovered were very broken and unfortunately disturbed by the excavations.

A very well-preserved tusk of a plant-eating reptile, possibly a Dicynodon lacerticeps, was later recorded. The discovery of well-preserved bone fossils in the main quarry indicated that the interbedded mudstones in the region might have provided valuable information on the fauna of the ancient environment in that region.

Eskom Holdings donated a container for the storage of fossils on site. Temporary curation of fossils was supplied for that storage. The Gorgonopsid and other fossils recorded up to 31 January 2009 were then transported to the National Museum in Bloemfontein on 11 March 2009.

=== Types of dinosaurs discovered ===
Massospondylus

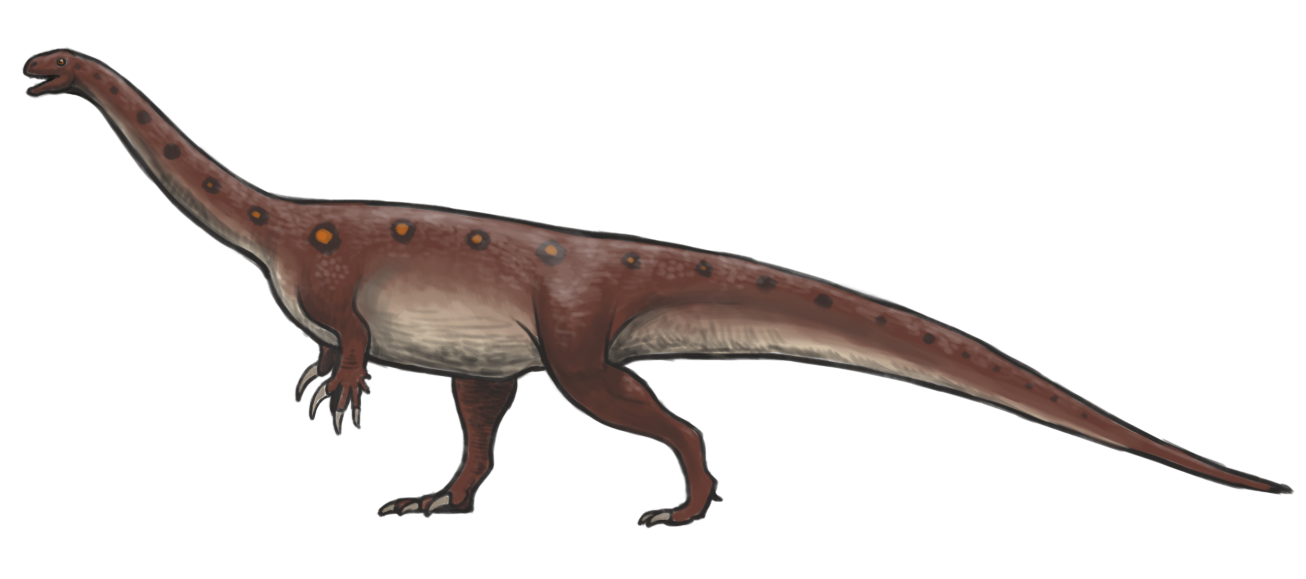
Simple reconstruction of Massospondylus carinatus, the early Jurassic "prosauropod" from Africa

The team discovered the remains of the largest dinosaur to walk in the southern parts of Africa, namely a 190-million-year-old fossilised egg of a Massospondylus dinosaur. This dinosaur lived in the Late Triassic and Early Jurassic, a period from about 230-million years ago to about 185-million years ago. The Massospondylus wandered about in great herds, migrating back and forth between what would, millions of years later, become Southern Africa and Russia, when the southern super-continent, Gondwana, was still intact. The rocks that were laid down during this period are called the Stormberg Group of rocks, and it is in rocks of the Stormberg Group that the fossils of Massospondylus and other dinosaurs were found. Massospondylus dinosaurs hatched from eggs not much larger than a hen’s egg, but grew into big creatures 5 to 6 metres long. They had large bodies, long necks and small heads, and long tails.

Antetonitrus

Another species found was a 210-million-year-old sauropod named Antetonitrus. It was found in the Ladybrand District of the Free State (province). The dinosaurs dominated the region for about 120-million years until the end of the Cretaceous Period, 65-million years ago.

== See also ==
- Massospondylus
- Antetonitrus
