= Tsotetsi =

Tsotetsi is a surname. Notable people with this surname include:

- Dikeledi Tsotetsi (born 1956), South African politician
- Mokete Tsotetsi (born 1982), South African soccer player
