= Mmanthatisi =

Leader of the Tlokwa people

Chief of Batlokwa ba Mokotleng
- Reign: 1813 – 1824
- Predecessor: Mokotjo
- Successor: Sekonyela
- Born: Monyaduwe; 1784; Thaba-Ntsho, near Harrismith
- Died: Jwala-Boholo
- Burial: Unknown; Jwala-Boholo
- Spouse: Mokotjo
- Issue: Kgosi Sekonyela, Nthatisi, Mota
Names
- Monyaduwe Mosesanyane Mmanthatisi
- Father: Mothaha

Mmanthatisi (also spelled Manthatisi or MmaNthatisi and erroneously spelled as 'Mantatee’, 'Ma Nthisi, Mantatise; c. 1784 – 1847) was the leader of the Tlokwa people during her son's minority from 1813 until 1824. She came to power as the regent for her son, Sekonyela, (Lentsha) following the death of her husband Kgosi Mokotjo (the previous kgosi). Mmanthatisi was known as a strong, brave and capable leader, both in times of peace and war. She was referred to by her followers as Mosesanyane (the tiny one) because of her slender body.

Although her tribe was known as Balefe, during her reign, they came to be known as boo-Mmanthatisi or Manthatee Horde by the English. In the midst of the Mfecane/Difaqane wars - a period of mass migration, Mmanthatisi used her power, dedication, bravery and staunch character to keep her people together, despite the frequent raids by the Nguni group.

== Early life ==
Mmanthatisi's name at birth was Monyaduwe. She was the daughter of Mothaha, a chief of the Basia tribe, (Note: Also called the Basia or Mosia.) and was born in what is now South Africa's Free State province, in the area of the present-day town of Harrismith. Described as an attractive, tall and light in complexion, beautiful girl, she was said to have good manners and was admired for her intelligence. Mmanthatisi grew up near Ntswanatsatsi, the legendary home of humankind. Basia, the people of the Wild Cat, were known to be unsociable at best, warlike at worst. In the praise songs of these people of the Wild Cat, it was said that

“their shields dried outside in the field of battle, and not in their huts, where they remained wet with blood. A gruesome image, indeed, and it came from the frequency with which the Basia engaged in battle so that their shields kept dripping the blood of their victims. So the Batlokwa, who were also inclined to fight rather than flee, had a leader with warrior blood in her veins – Mmanthatisi”.

The Batlokwa (Ma-Ana Nkwe) are a breakway branch of the Bakgatla clan of the Bantu-speaking Sotho-Tswana communities which originated from the Great Lakes and Northern Central Africa. During the time of Kgosi Mokotjo (the husband of Mmanthatisi), the Batlokwa lived in Nkwe (also spelled Nkoe) and then later moved to Sefate. The name of the Batlokwa capital reflected their totem – the leopard. This area Nkwe/Sefate in Verkykerskop near Harrismith (Thaba-Nchu) which was occupied by Batlokwa, was declared a provincial heritage site in the Free State in 2016.

== Mmanthatisi becomes a Motlokwa ==
At a young age, she was married off to a cousin, Mokotjo, who was the chief of the Batlokwa. The two married in a typical dynastic alliance. Their first child, a daughter, was born around 1800 and she was named Nthatisi. It is customary in teknonymic Batswana culture for a woman to take a new name upon her marriage with the prefix Mma- which means mother, followed by her child's name . This is how Monyaduwe became MmaNthatisi (or Mmanthatisi) because her first child was named Nthatisi. A second child, a son named Sekonyela, was born in 1804 and became heir to the chieftainship, and a second son, Mota, was born later.

== Regency ==
Mokotjo died in 1813, at the age of 27 and Mmanthatisi became regent for Sekonyela, who was too young to rule. Mokotjo died following an illness while on a mission to claim the area around Hohobeng from the rival Batlokwa chief – Lebaka. He contracted a disease, died, and his body was sent back to Nkwe for burial. Mmanthatisi continued relations with the Basia, conferring with Basia advisors and sending her son to be raised in her brother's, Basia home. At the time of Mokotjo's death, Sekonyela was only nine years old and it would be another ten years before he was old enough to rule. The same thing had happened to Mokotjo's mother Ntlo-Kholo who had married Montoedi. When Montoedi died, Ntlo-Kholo assumed the reigns until Mokotjo came of age.

Sehalahala who's Mokotjo's half brother opposed Mmanthatisi's leadership and felt that she was a foreigner (as she was born a Mosia) and the people wanted to be ruled by a "pure" Motlokwa. Others resented being led by a woman. Despite this, Mmanthatisi remained resolute and headstrong as she led the Batlokwa. When Sekonyela was old enough for circumcision, Mmanthatisi sent him to her own Basia people, removing him at the last minute from the BaTlokwa ceremony that she had forbidden him to attend in the first place. Sekonyela was escorted by Mmanthatisi's brother, Letlala, to ensure that he was safe. Before his death, Mokotjo had forewarned Mmanthatisi to beware of the older sons of his father's second wife – Moepi and Sehalahala - who had threatened his life when he was a child. Mokotjo believed they were a great threat to the life of his heir.

The Batlokwa practised the levirate marriage, and after being widowed she was consequently remarried to her brother-in-law, Sehalahala, with whom she had another son. Due to the rise of the militaristic Zulu Kingdom, Mmanthatisi decided to move her tribe westward. In 1817, her warriors led a raid on the Ndwandwe, capturing many of their cattle. This and other victories led to an alliance with the Hlubi people, and an attack on the territory of Moshoeshoe (who would later become the first paramount chief of Basutolandi). It has been estimated that Mmanthatisi led between 35,000 and 40,000 when the expanded Tlokwa group was at its largest.

== Victories ==
In 1822, during the Mfecane/Difaqane Wars, the AmaHlubi (led by Mpangazitha) and AmaNgwane (led by Matiwane) attacked Mmanthatisi and her homestead. It was said that they attacked Mmanthatisi and her followers in the early hours of the morning so they would be caught off guard. Although they were unprepared, her brave warriors fought Mpangazitha and his troops. This was however a terrible defeat for Mmanthatisi who managed to flee to her brother Letlala's home, with some of her people. In one night, the world of the Batlokwa had changed forever. They had lost their homes, most of their cattle and possessions. Not only that, but many had lost their family members whether through death or left behind to the mercies of the invaders. Her brother invited her to stay but she refused as some of her followers had planned to take the cattle of their hosts. Kgosi. Nkgahle, of the Batlokwa ba Mokgalong, who lived nearby, offered sanctuary and assistance, but this she also refused. She was afraid of losing the independence of her tribe, especially since the Mokgalong branch were the senior kingdom to her Batlokwa ba Mokotleng. She also had reason to believe that Nkgahle had been involved in some treachery aimed at deposing her, and so she did not trust him. She was also worried that Mpangazitha might follow their trails and come to finish them off and also invade the people of her birth. Mmanthatisi instead chose to lead her followers westwards and do what her people were known for, which was fight.

Their attacks were so furious that Mmanthatisi and her followers were forced to abandon all their possessions and flee. They in turn encountered people who occupied areas next to the upper Vaal River and drove them from their land. A number of smaller tribes joined Mmanthatisi under her leadership in search of relative security. The tribe grew and soon started causing havoc for Sotho tribes who lived around the Caledon River. Mmanthatisi became so powerful that she had her name used by victims to describe their assailants. To grow her tribe, she forced captured enemies to become part of her horde. Many people were killed and about 28 tribes were obliterated.

== Reputation ==
During her regency, Mmanthatisi ruled over 40 000 people, exercising the duties of a chief, consulting elders for advice, advancing her military and political authority and adjudicating disputes. In time, her subjects started referring to themselves as Manthatisis, according her the usual tribute given to powerful chiefs. Rumours were created that she had a single eye on her forehead and that she fed her followers with her own breast milk. Tribes who knew of this, grew afraid of her and made no attempt to band together and resist. Famous for her intelligence, one time when her soldiers were away, Mmanthatisi prevented an attack by gathering all the women together and forming them in ranks in front of the camp. In front of them she placed the men who were left in the camp. These men brandished mats and hoes which the women had been carrying. When viewed from a distance, it gave the appearance of a strong force of warriors, which gave pause to Mpangazitha – son of AmaHlubi Chief, Bhungane. Mpangazitha had hoped to find the camp defenceless, however this new discovery caused him to halt the mission and make a fresh plan. Her reign of military conquest extended as far as central modern day Botswana. At the height of her military and political power, her army was estimated to contain close to forty thousand fighters. Since leaving Nkwe, Mmanthatisi had managed to defeat all opposition in the territories she had come across. Her victory run would end in the Battle of Dithakong when, on 23 June 1823, she suffered a massive defeat which was recorded by Robert Moffat in his diary near present-day Kuruman. Peter Becker describes the developments in one of his works when he states that:

"Meanwhile, Mmanthatisi was approaching with forty thousand men, women and children; it was January 1823, the time of the year crops were ripening and food was usually plentiful. But the Manthatisis were compelled to live frugally, for so great had been the chaos brought about by Difaqane in general and the plundering of Mmanthatisi, Mpangazitha and Matiwane in particular that entire tribes had vanished from their settlements even before they had tilled their fields in preparation for planting. Indeed, the Central Plateau swarmed with hunger-stricken stragglers and small, detached parties of bandits. Apart from roots, bulbs and berries, there was little food to be found in the veld, certainly not enough to feed so large a horde as that of Manthatisi.

== The Battle of Dithakong 23 June 1823 ==
The battle of Dithakong was fought between Manthatisi hordes and Batlhaping with the help of the Griqua. The epic battle that took almost seven hours, was recorded by Robert Moffat on 23 June 1823 where the BaThlaping found themselves threatened by thousands of Batlokwa of Mmanthatisi – the Phuting and the Hlakwana. The tribes fought each other for dwindling supplies of cattle and corn. They were armed, hungry and intent on raiding the BaThlaping's cattle. This conflagration was rolling westwards – in the direction of Kuruman. Reverend Moffat rushed from Kuruman to Griquatown to persuade the Griqua to assist the BaThlaping. Reverend Waterboer in Griquatown, assisted by other Griqua leaders (Barend Barends from Danielskuil and Adam Kok II from Campbell) rode northwards with about 200 men. They were accompanied by BaTlhaping warriors.

About 200 Griqua horsemen led by Barend Barends, armed with guns, faced the massed ranks of the Batlokwa armed with spears and cowhide shields. The BaTlhaping age regiments were held in reserve as the Griqua launched their attack.

The Batlokwa suffered terrible casualties were forced to flee, a devastating and a first loss for Mmanthatisi after obliterating almost 29 tribes since leaving Harrismith at the start of Difaqane. Nonetheless, the most prosperous of the Bechuana chiefs, Makaba of the Bangwaketsi, decided to fight Manthatisi head on. Peter Becker said:

"Meanwhile, the old Chief had decided not to surrender to Mmanthatisi without a fight. He called up every available warrior, garrisoned every pass leading to his capital, and with the guile for which he was famous, prepared traps into which he planned to lead his aggressors.

A battle broke out and hundreds of the invaders were massacred. Mmanthatisi then decided to disengage her army and retreated with her hordes to the east. This made Makaba the second Tswana chief to repulse the formidable Mmanthatisi army.

She was stopped from entering the Cape Colony by British Forces near Aliwal North.

In her march back into the present day Free State, Mmanthatisi forced Bataung and Bafokeng across the Lekwa (Vaal) River. At this time, she was looking for a resting place as her nation was war weary. They approached Butha-Buthe, which was occupied by Moshoeshoe and his people, and forced them out. This is when Moshoeshoe settled at Thaba-Bosiu, escaping Mmanthatisi. Although portrayed as an evil woman by some contemporary Europeans, Mmanthatisi was a strong, capable and popular leader; both in war and peace. Unlike other chiefs who fell victim to the Difaqane Wars, she successfully kept her people together in the midst of frequent raids by Nguni groups to the south. In 1824 when Mmanthatisi felt that Sekonyela had reached maturity, she retired and Sekonyela effectively took over as the sole ruler of the Batlokwa social structures and military.

== Retirement ==
The Botlokwa then settled along the confluence of the Senqu and Mahlakeng Rivers. Mmanthatisi settled at the mountain strongholds of Marabeng, while her son and heir settled at another stronghold close by, at Jwala-Boholo. Jwala-Boholo – Majestic Mountain – located East of Ficksburg in the Free State was first occupied by a branch of the Bakoena tribe, known as Marabe. It was later wrestled from them by the Batlokwa under the command of Mmanthatisi. This natural fortress served as her capital for many years. It was here that many a conquest was planned.

Chieftainess Mmanthatisi was laid to rest on Jwala-Boholo in 1847. She was one of the best known, and most feared, women military and political leaders of the early 19th century.

== Legacy ==
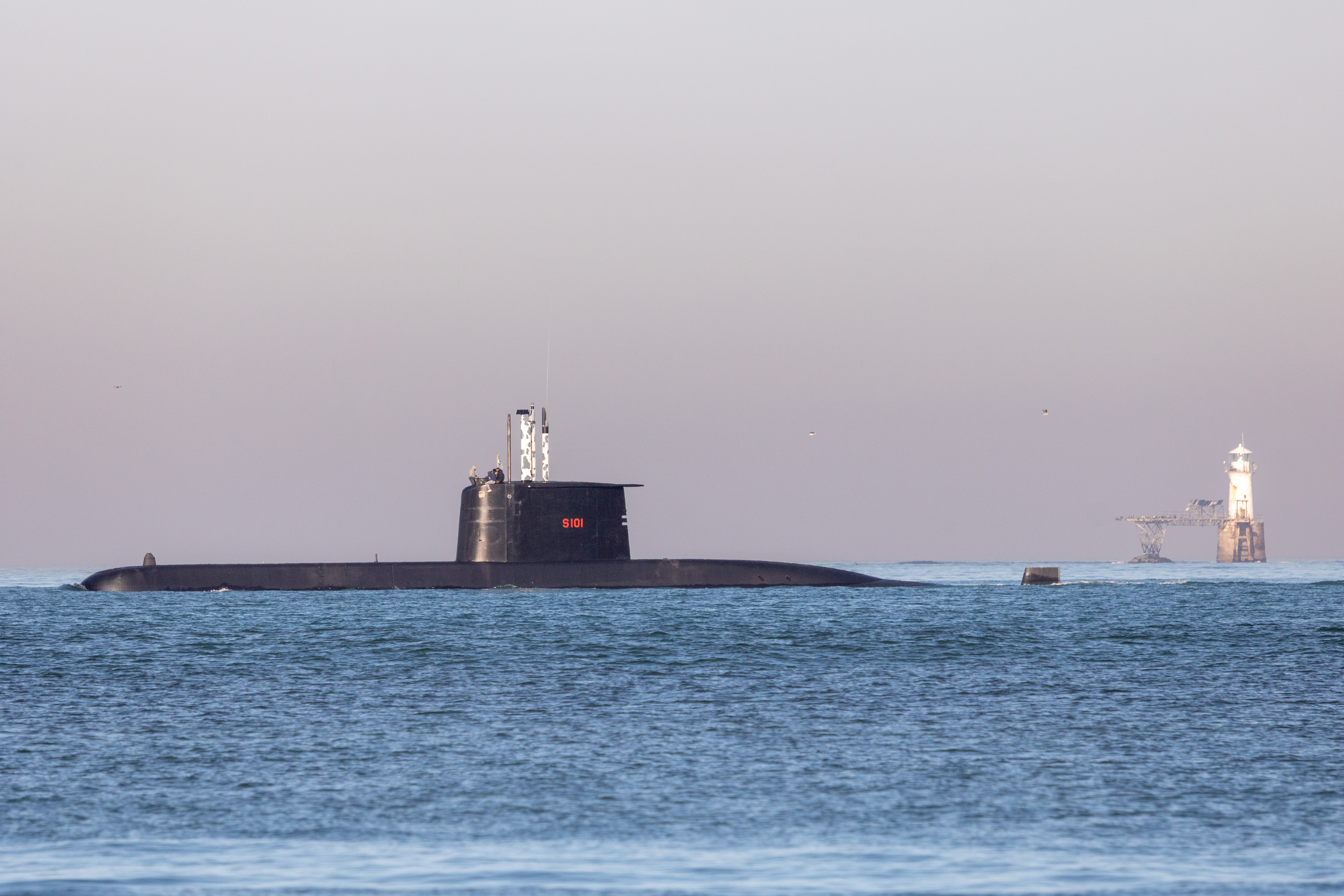
Manthatisi Submarine

SAS Manthatisi (S101) Heroine-class submarine currently in service with the South African Navy is named after her.

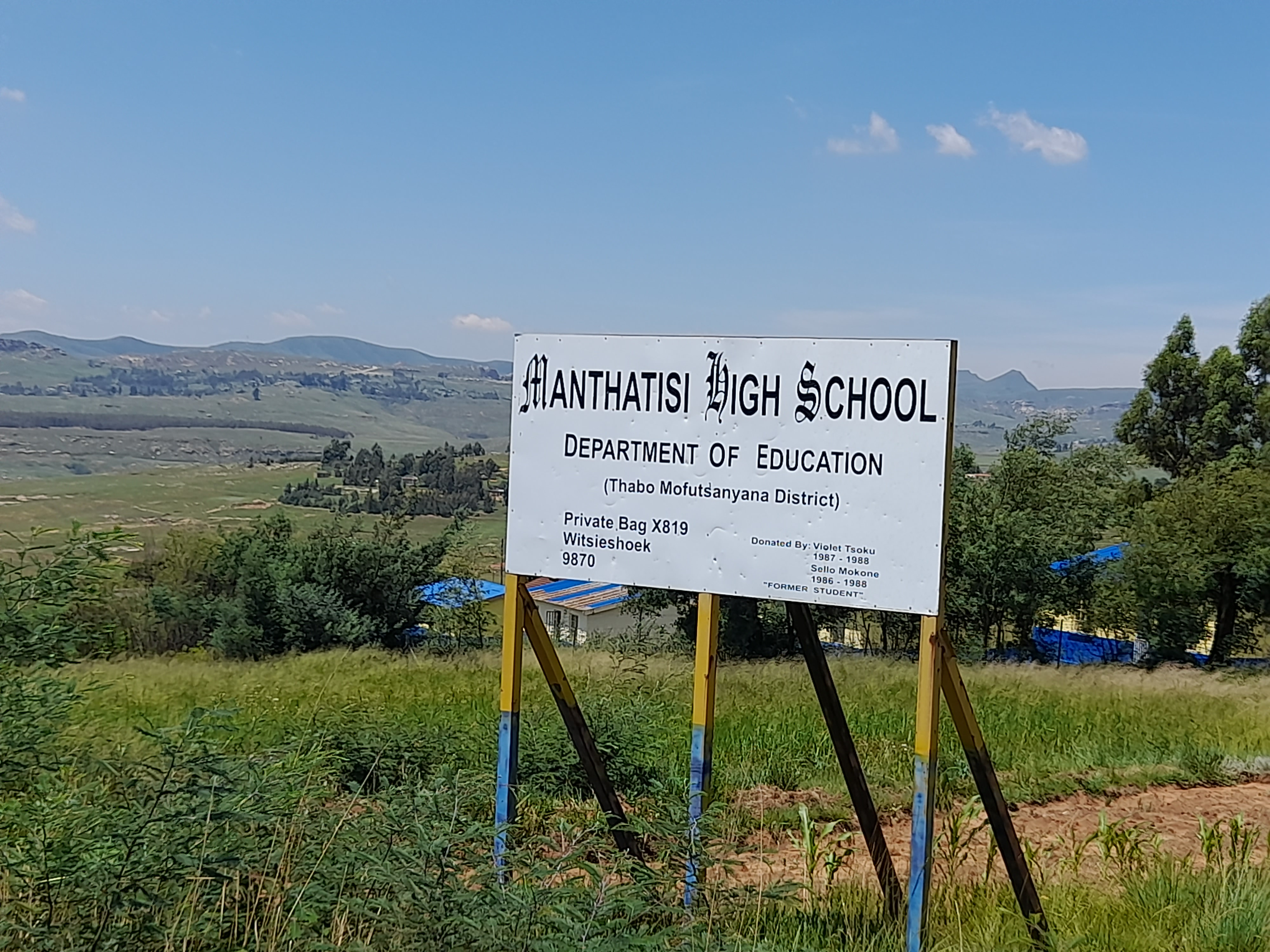
Manthatisi High School

Manthatisi Secondary School in QwaQwa is named after her.

A farm presently called Verkykerskop near Harrismith once occupied and called Nkwe/Sefate by Batlokwa has been declared a provincial heritage site by the Free State Provincial Heritage Resources Authority in 2014.

== See also ==
- Moshoeshoe I
- Batlokwa
- Mfecane
