= Herschel, South Africa =

Herschel
- Location within Eastern Cape Location within South Africa
- Coordinates: 30°36′54″S 27°9′43″E
- Country: South Africa
- Province: Eastern Cape
- District: Joe Gqabi
- Municipality: Senqu

Area
  - Total: 4.48 km^{2} (1.73 sq mi)
- Elevation: 1,830 m (6,000 ft)

Population (2011)
  - Total: 2,189
  - Density: 489/km^{2} (1,270/sq mi)

Racial makeup (2011)
  - Black African: 99.9%
  - Coloured: 0.1%

First languages (2011)
  - Xhosa: 7.5%
  - Sotho: 10.1%
  - Hlubi: 80%
  - Other: 2.3%
- Time zone: UTC+2 (SAST)
- Postal code (street): 9756
- PO box: 9756
- Area code: 051-603

Herschel is a settlement in Joe Gqabi District Municipality in the Eastern Cape province of South Africa.

The village is situated 19 kilometres (12 mi) north of Lady Grey, due east of Aliwal North. Founded in 1879, it was named after the astronomer Sir John Herschel who worked in the Cape Colony from 1834 to 1838, making observations of Halley's Comet amongst his other astronomical work.

== Climate ==
Climate data for Herschel (normals for 1880-1952)
Month	Jan	Feb	Mar	Apr	May	Jun	Jul	Aug	Sep	Oct	Nov	Dec	Year
Average precipitation mm (inches)	96.1 (3.78)	96.8 (3.81)	105.6 (4.16)	58.3 (2.30)	37.0 (1.46)	16.1 (0.63)	13.2 (0.52)	19.3 (0.76)	29.4 (1.16)	50.9 (2.00)	64.5 (2.54)	83.2 (3.28)	670.4 (26.4)
Average precipitation days (≥ 0.01 in)	8	8.2	8.9	5.5	3.6	2	1.5	2	3	5	6	7	60.7
