= Irving Fish =

United States Army Major general

Irving Andrews Fish
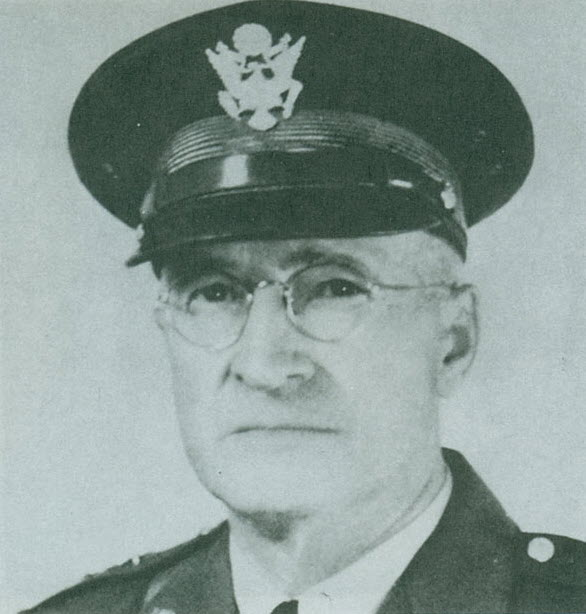
- Born: August 25, 1881; Racine, Wisconsin, US
- Died: April 22, 1948 (aged 66) Milwaukee, Wisconsin, US
- Buried: Mound Cemetery
- Allegiance: United States
- Branch: United States Army
- Service years: 1903–1945
- Rank: Major general
- Commands: 32nd Infantry Division
- Conflicts: Pancho Villa Expedition; World War I World War II
- Awards: Legion of Merit

Irving Andrews Fish (August 25, 1881 – April 22, 1948) was a lawyer and member of the Wisconsin National Guard and Major general in the United States Army during World War II. A veteran of World War I, Fish rose to the command of 32nd Infantry Division ("Red Arrow") in December 1938 and supervised division's pre-war training and preparation for combat deployment.

Fish was relieved of command in March 1942, because United States Army preferred Regular Army officer in command of combat division. He spent rest of the War in Washington, D.C., serving on staff positions in the United States War Department.

== Biography ==
=== Early career ===
Irving A. Fish was born on August 25, 1881, in Racine, Wisconsin; he was the son of John T. Fish and Eliza Sampson. His father was an attorney and Union veteran of the American Civil War, serving as a captain in the 13th Wisconsin Infantry Regiment. Irving graduated from the high school in Racine and enrolled at the University of Wisconsin in summer of 1899. While at the university, he was a member of the Cadet Corps and enlisted in the Wisconsin National Guard.

Fish graduated with a Bachelor of Laws in June 1903 and was promoted to captain in the 1st Wisconsin Infantry Regiment. He was admitted to the State Bar of Wisconsin in 1903 and began practice law in Racine and then Madison, Wisconsin. In 1907, Fish moved to Milwaukee and began working for the law firm Quarles, Spence & Quarles. He rose to the rank of Major in the National Guard by February 1913, and when his regiment was called up for federal service in July 1916, he served on the Mexican Border during Pancho Villa Expedition.

Upon the United States entry into World War I, the 1st Wisconsin Infantry was converted to 120th Field Artillery Regiment and deployed to France as part of the 32nd Infantry Division after a period of intensive training. Fish then participated in the Battles of Marne, Oise and Meuse-Argonne Offensive on the Western Front and returned stateside as Colonel.

=== Interwar period ===
Following his return stateside, Fish resumed his law practice. He was commissioned a colonel in the Organized Reserve field artillery on 13 October 1919, and commanded the 376th Field Artillery Regiment of the 101st Division from October 1921 to January 1927. In December 1926, Fish assumed command of the 57th Field Artillery Brigade of the 32nd Infantry Division, and was promoted to the rank of brigadier general in the Wisconsin National Guard on 6 July 1927. He was then promoted to major general on 22 December 1938, and assumed command of the 32nd Infantry Division.

=== World War II ===
The 32nd Infantry Division was called up for federal service in mid-October 1940, and Fish assumed the rank of major general in the Army of the United States. His division was made up of National Guard units from Michigan and Wisconsin. Fish supervised its pre-deployment training at Camp Beauregard, Louisiana and then led the division during the Louisiana Maneuvers in the fall of 1941.

Following the United States entry into World War II, Fish was replaced by Regular Army Major General Edwin F. Harding and ordered to Fort Lewis, Washington, for duty as commanding general of troops. He also assumed an additional duty as commander of a subsector of Western Defense Command. While in this capacity, he was responsible for the interior defense of Washington and Oregon. Fish was transferred to the Adjutant General Office, War Department General Staff in Washington, D.C. in May 1943 and assumed duty as a member of the War Department Dependency Board under Major General Jay L. Benedict. The board was responsible for policies governing the release of casualty information to next-of-kin.

In January 1944, when Secretary of War Henry L. Stimson established the Secretary of War's Separation Board, Fish joined that board as a member under Major General William Bryden. Consisting of five general officers of the Regular Army and Reserves (MG Bryden; MG Fish; BG Nathaniel H. Egleston; BG Frank S. Clark; BG Edward A. Evans), the board acted on behalf of Secretary of War on matters pertaining to commissioned and warrant officers like separation and relief from active duty, retention on active duty in a limited service status after appearance before a reclassification board, certain cases involving disability, etc. For his service in Washington, he was decorated with the Army's Legion of Merit medal.

=== Retirement and death ===
Upon his retirement from the Army on October 10, 1945, Fish returned to Milwaukee, where he resumed his law practice with the law firm of Fish, Marshutz and Hoffman. He died suddenly on April 22, 1948, aged 66 and was buried at Mound Cemetery in his native Racine, Wisconsin. Fish was survived by his wife, Margaret, and a son, James.

== Honors and awards ==
Here is the ribbon bar of Major general Fish:

1st Row	Legion of Merit	Mexican Border Service Medal	World War I Victory Medal with three battle clasps
2nd Row	American Defense Service Medal	American Campaign Medal	World War II Victory Medal
