= William R. Shockley =

William Ralph Shockley
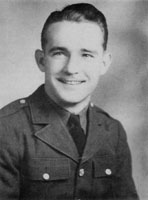
- William R. Shockley
- Born: December 4, 1918; Bokoshe, Oklahoma
- Died: March 31, 1945 (aged 26); Luzon, Philippines
- Burial place: Floral Memorial Cemetery, Selma, California
- Military career
- Allegiance: United States
- Branch: United States Army
- Rank: Private First Class
- Units: 128th Infantry Regiment, 32nd Infantry Division
- Conflicts: World War II
- Awards: Medal of Honor; Bronze Star; Purple Heart (2)

William Ralph Shockley (December 4, 1918 – March 31, 1945) was a United States Army soldier and a recipient of the United States military's highest decoration—the Medal of Honor—for his actions in World War II.

== Biography ==
He was born December 4, 1918, in Bokoshe, Oklahoma and enlisted in the Army from Selma, California. By March 31, 1945, he was serving as a private first class in Company L, 128th Infantry Regiment, 32nd Infantry Division. During a Japanese counterattack on that day, on the Villa Verde Trail in Luzon, the Philippines, he voluntarily stayed behind and provided covering fire while the rest of his unit retreated. Shockley was killed by the advancing Japanese soldiers. He was posthumously awarded the Medal of Honor seven months later, on October 19, 1945.

Shockley, aged 26 at his death, was buried in Floral Memorial Cemetery, Selma, California.

== Medal of Honor citation ==
Private First Class Shockley's official Medal of Honor citation reads:

He was in position with his unit on a hill when the enemy, after a concentration of artillery fire, launched a counterattack. He maintained his position under intense enemy fire and urged his comrades to withdraw, saying that he would "remain to the end" to provide cover. Although he had to clear two stoppages which impeded the reloading of his weapon, he halted one enemy charge. Hostile troops then began moving in on his left flank, and he quickly shifted his gun to fire on them. Knowing that the only route of escape was being cut off by the enemy, he ordered the remainder of his squad to withdraw to safety and deliberately remained at his post. He continued to fire until he was killed during the ensuing enemy charge. Later, four Japanese were found dead in front of his position. Pfc. Shockley, facing certain death, sacrificed himself to save his fellow soldiers, but the heroism and gallantry displayed by him enabled his squad to reorganize and continue its attack.

== See also ==
- List of Medal of Honor recipients
- List of Medal of Honor recipients for World War II
