= Thomas E. Atkins =

United States Army Medal of Honor recipient (1921–1999)

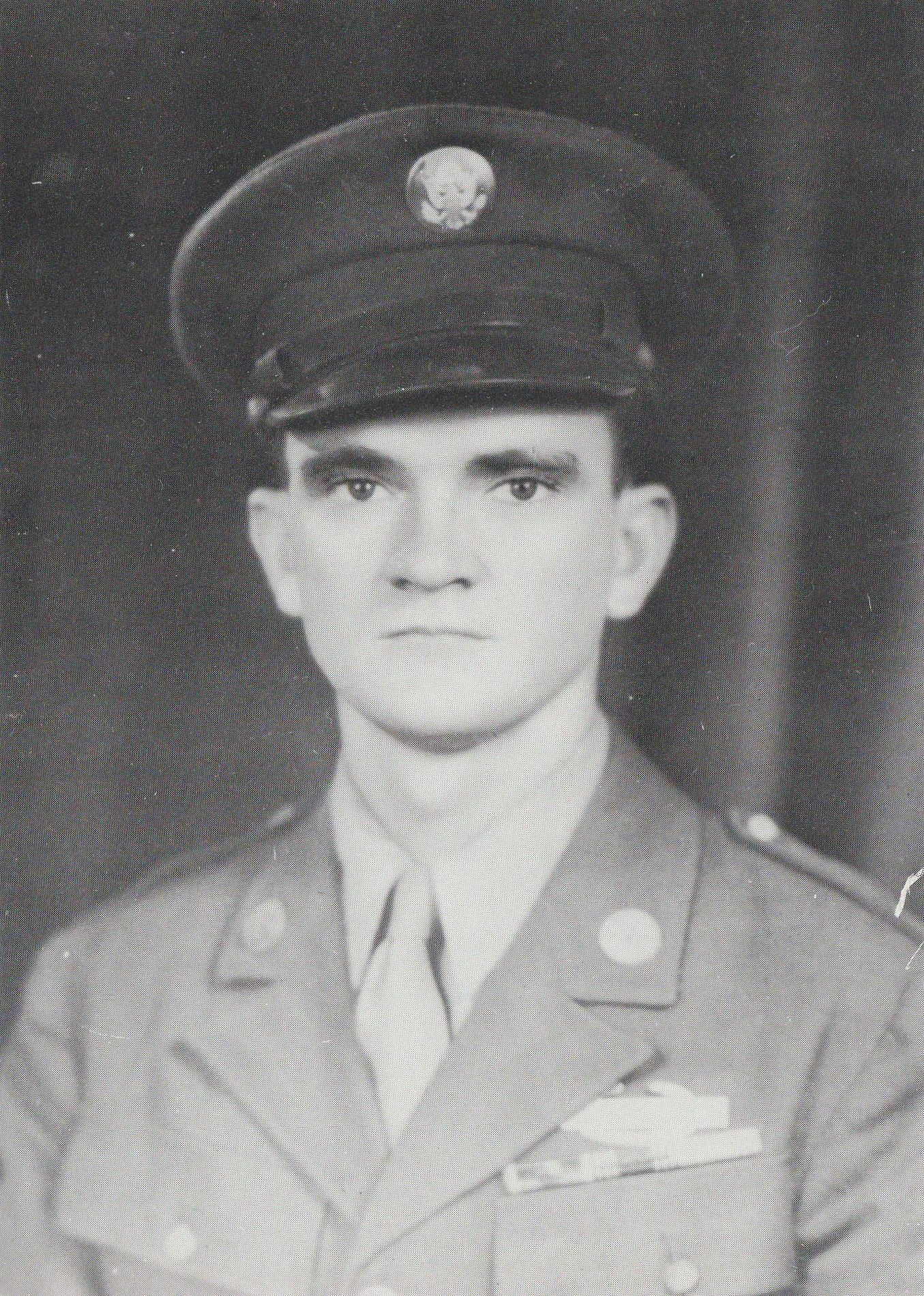
- Born: February 5, 1921; Campobello, South Carolina
- Died: September 15, 1999 (aged 78); Inman, South Carolina
- Burial place: Fellowship Baptist Church Cemetery, Holly Springs, South Carolina
- Military career
- Allegiance: United States of America
- Branch: United States Army
- Service years: 1942–1945
- Rank: Corporal
- Units: Company A, 127th Infantry Regiment, 32nd Infantry Division
- Conflicts: World War II: Pacific War; Philippines campaign (1944-45); Battle of Luzon (WIA)
- Awards: Medal of Honor; Bronze Star; Purple Heart

Thomas E. Atkins (February 5, 1921 – September 15, 1999) was a Private in the United States Army who received the Medal of Honor for actions in World War II during a skirmish on 10 March 1945 in the Battle of Luzon.

He joined the Army from his birth town in December 1942.

== Medal of Honor citation ==
He fought gallantly on the Villa Verde Trail, Luzon, Philippine Islands. With 2 companions he occupied a position on a ridge outside the perimeter defense established by the 1st Platoon on a high hill. At about 3 a.m., 2 companies of Japanese attacked with rifle and machinegun fire, grenades, TNT charges, and land mines, severely wounding Pfc. Tom Atkins and killing his 2 companions. Despite the intense hostile fire and pain from his deep wound, he held his ground and returned heavy fire. After the attack was repulsed, he remained in his precarious position to repel any subsequent assaults instead of returning to the American lines for medical treatment. An enemy machinegun, set up within 20 yards of his foxhole, vainly attempted to drive him off or silence his gun. The Japanese repeatedly made fierce attacks, but for 4 hours, Pfc. Tom Atkins determinedly remained in his fox hole, bearing the brunt of each assault and maintaining steady and accurate fire until each charge was repulsed. At 7 a.m., 13 enemy dead lay in front of his position; he had fired 400 rounds, all he and his 2 dead companions possessed, and had used 3 rifles until each had jammed too badly for further operation. He withdrew during a lull to secure a rifle and more ammunition, and was persuaded to remain for medical treatment. While waiting, he saw a Japanese within the perimeter and, seizing a nearby rifle, killed him. A few minutes later, while lying on a litter, he discovered an enemy group moving up behind the platoon's lines. Despite his severe wound, he sat up, delivered heavy rifle fire against the group and forced them to withdraw. Pfc. Tom Atkins' superb bravery and his fearless determination to hold his post against the main force of repeated enemy attacks, even though painfully wounded, were major factors in enabling his comrades to maintain their lines against a numerically superior enemy force.

== After the war ==
Atkins retired from the army and settled in his home town of Campobello, South Carolina where he eventually became a farmer. He died on 15 September 1999, from congestive heart failure.

== See also ==
- List of Medal of Honor recipients for World War II
