= 114th Engineer Combat Battalion (United States) =

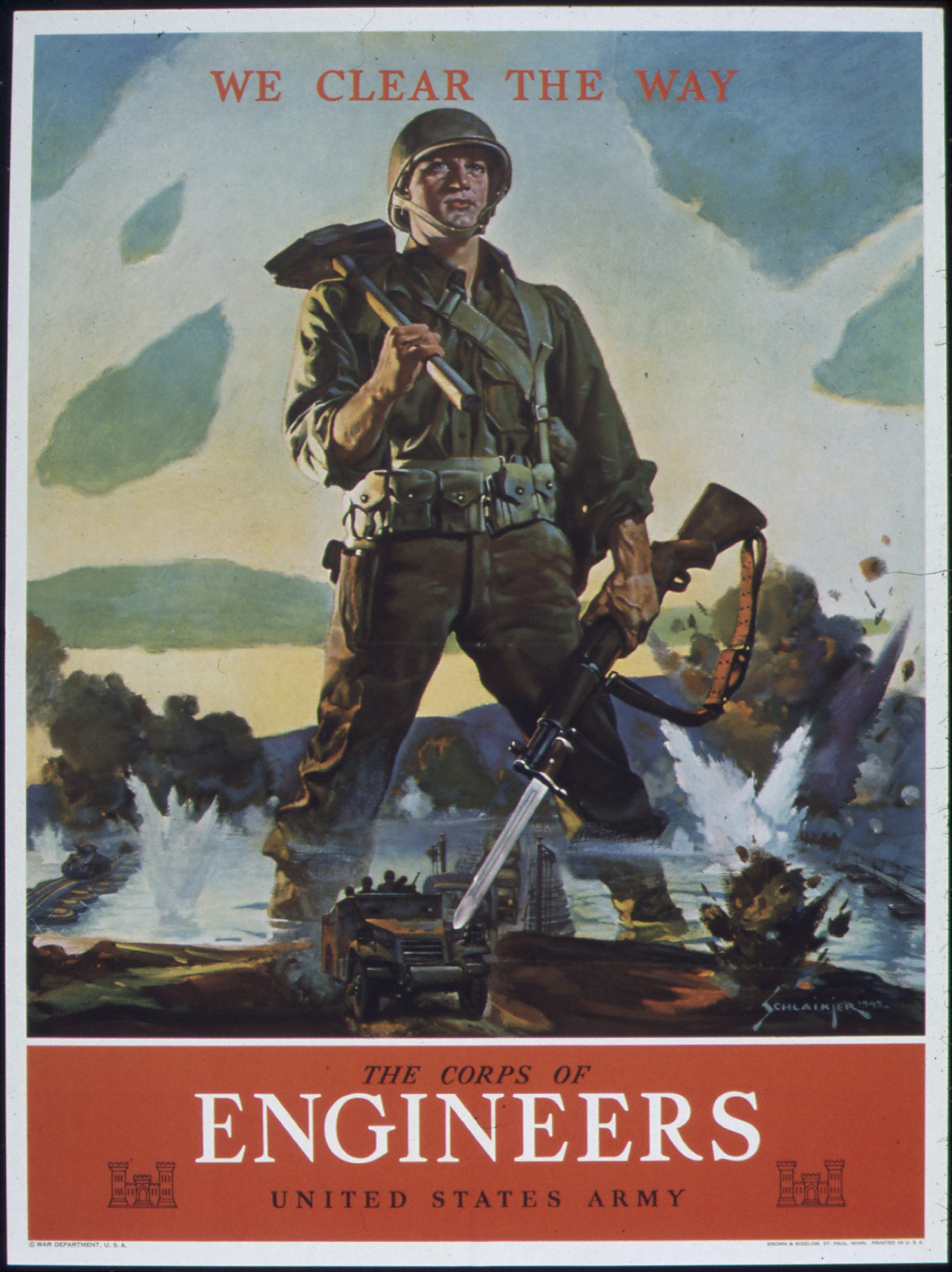
World War II recruiting poster for the U.S. Army Corps of Engineers

The 114th Engineer Battalion was an engineer battalion of the United States Army. The battalion was activated on 4 April 1942, at Camp Edwards, Massachusetts, and was inactivated on 28 February 1946 in Japan.

During World War II, the battalion was attached to the 32nd Infantry Division to replace the 107th Engineer Combat Battalion, which was bound for Ireland. They fought with the 32nd Infantry Division in Papua New Guinea, and in the Philippines.
