= 121st Field Artillery Regiment (United States) =

1-121st Field Artillery
- 157th Maneuver Enhancement Brigade shoulder sleeve insignia
- Active: 11 May 1885—
- Country: United States of America
- Allegiance: State of Wisconsin
- Branch: National Guard
- Type: Artillery
- Role: Combat Support
- Nickname: "Iron Brigade"
- Engagements: World War I, World War II, Operation Iraqi Freedom, War in Afghanistan

Insignia
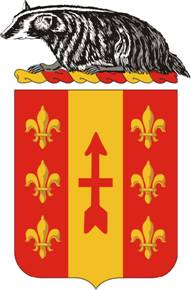
- Distinctive Unit Insignia

The 1st Battalion, 121st Field Artillery is currently part of the 157th Maneuver Enhancement Brigade that is based out of Milwaukee, Wisconsin. Attached to the 1-121st is Battery A located in Hartford, Wisconsin; Battery B located in Plymouth, Wisconsin; 108th Forward Support Company located in Sussex, Wisconsin.

The 1-121st FA originally operated M109 howitzer before switching to the M270 Multiple Launch Rocket System (MLRS) in 2003. As of 2010 the 1-121st FA operates the M142 High Mobility Artillery Rocket System (HIMARS).

== Early history ==
On 11 September 1884, the Wisconsin Army National Guard Field Artillery was born when twelve men signed an agreement to organize a field artillery battery in Milwaukee. The formal organization occurred on 11 May 1885, with the creation of the 1st Light Battery. The battery had 65 members, occupied the Farwell Avenue Skating Rink, and trained on a vacant lot on North Prospect Avenue.

During 1916, the 1st Field Artillery was formed. On 8 June 1916, Battery B was established in Green Bay. On 12 June 1916, Battery C was established in Racine. On 14 June 1916, Battery A, 1st Light Artillery was re-designated as Battery A, 1st Field Artillery. On 30 June 1916, Battery A, 1st Field Artillery was called to active duty on the Mexican border as organized forces were making raids into the United States. Having served with distinction, the battery was released at Camp Douglas, Wisconsin, on 16 October 1916, and reconstituted as the Wisconsin National Guard unit at Whitefish Bay, Wisconsin.

== First World War ==
Following the United States' declaration of war on Germany in April 1917, the 32nd Division was reorganized under War Department orders of 18 July 1917, from National Guard troops from Wisconsin and Michigan. Wisconsin provided approximately 15,000 troops whilst Michigan raised 8,000. Later 4,000 National Army troops from Wisconsin and Michigan were transferred to the Division shortly before it left for France. On 4 August 1917, Battery F, 121st Field Artillery regiment, was the first unit of the new division to arrive at Camp MacArthur, Texas. From that time until late in September troops continued to pour in as rapidly as railroad facilities could be provided to transport them from the north. The 1st Wisconsin Field Artillery regiment became the 121st Field Artillery, the heavy artillery regiment of the 57th Field Artillery Brigade. The Commanding Officer of the Wisconsin Artillery, Colonel Philip C. Westfahl, became Commander of the new regiment.

On 19 September 1917, the Regiment was re-designated as the 121st Field Artillery Regiment and assigned to the 57th Field Artillery Brigade as a part of the 32nd Division. In addition to the 32nd Division, the records indicated the 121st Field Artillery Regiment also supported the 3rd, 47th, 79th, and the regiment distinguished itself in six major campaigns: Aisne-Marne, Alsace, Champagne, Lorraine, Meuse-Argonne, and Oise-Aisne. Along with the General of the Armies John J. Pershing's personal commendation, the regiment received the battle streamer of the French Croix-de-Guerre with Silver Star embroidered Aisne-Marne and Oise-Aisne. The 121st Field Artillery Regiment was demobilized at Camp Grant, Illinois., 17 May 1919.

== Second World War ==
On 1 February 1942, the 32nd Division was converted from "square" configuration to "triangular" and re-designated as the 32nd Infantry Division. Under the Division reorganization, the 121st Field Artillery Regiment was divided. The Regimental headquarters became the HQs for the 173rd Field Artillery Regiment, the 1st Battalion was redesignated as the 121st Field Artillery Battalion and the 2nd Battalion became the 1st Battalion 173rd Field Artillery Regiment. In February 1943 the 173rd Field Artillery Regiment would undergo further re-organizations, with the Regimental HQs becoming the 173rd Field Artillery Group and the 1-173rd being redesignated as the 985th Field Artillery Battalion, and the 2-173rd being redesignated as the 173rd Field Artillery Battalion.

The 121st Field Artillery Battalion, as designated on 1 February 1942, distinguished itself in the Pacific Theatre of Operations. Its honors were: Aitape, Biak, Leyte, Luzon and New Guinea (with Saidor Arrowhead). Early in 1943 the 121st Field Artillery Battalion was issued 75 mm howitzers in place of the 155 mm howitzers that were its normal weapons as the general support battalion of Division Artillery.

The 173rd Field Artillery Group, as designated in February 1943, distinguished itself in the European Theatre of Operations. Its honors were: Normandy, Northern France, Ardennes-Alsace and Central Europe.

The 985th Field Artillery Battalion and the 173rd Field Artillery Battalion, as designated in February 1943, distinguished itself in the Mediterranean Theatre of Operations. Its honors were: Naples-Foggia, Rome-Arno, North Apennines and Po Valley.

== Post-Second World War ==
Demobilization of the regiment following the end of the Second World War occurred over a six-month span: the 173rd Field Artillery Battalion on 11 September 1945, in Italy, the 985th Field Artillery Battalion on 8 October 1945, the 173rd Field Artillery Group on 27 November 1945, at Camp Kilmer, N.J., and the 121st Field Artillery Battalion on 28 February 1946, in Japan.

The 121st Field Artillery Battalion at Whitefish Bay and the 173rd Field Artillery Battalion at Superior were reconstituted as National Guard units on 3 June 1947, and 31 July 1947, respectively, as elements of the 32nd Infantry Division.

On 15 February 1961, the 121st Field Artillery Battalion was consolidated, reorganized, and redesignated under the Combat Arms Regimental Systems as units of the 121st Field Artillery. The 1st Howitzer Battalion at River Falls, the 2nd Howitzer Battalion at Marshfield, and the 3rd Rocket/Howitzer Battalion at Whitefish Bay.

On 15 October 1961, all battalions of the 121st Field Artillery were called to active duty with the 32nd Infantry Division for the Berlin Crisis. Having served with distinction at Fort Lewis, Washington, the 32nd Infantry Division was released on 10 August 1962, and returned under National Guard control within the 1st Battalion 121st Field Artillery at River Falls, the 2nd Battalion, 121st Field Artillery at River Falls, and the 3rd Battalion, 121st Field Artillery at Whitefish Bay.

On 1 April 1963, the 32nd Infantry Division was reorganized under the "ROAD" concept. Under this reorganization, the 2nd Battalion, 121st Field Artillery was demobilised. On 1 November 1964, the colors of the 1st Battalion, 121st Field Artillery were transferred from River Falls to Whitefish Bay.

On 31 July 1967, the 1st Battalion and the 3rd Battalion of the 121st Field Artillery were called to state duty during the 1967 Milwaukee riot. The battalions were released on 2 August 1962, then recalled for an additional day on 7 August 1967.

On 30 December 1967, the 32nd Infantry Division was inactivated and National Guard units realigned. Along with the 32nd Infantry Division, the 3rd Battalion, 121st Field Artillery was also inactivated.

On 5 November 1973, the 1st Battalion, 121st Field Artillery was called to state duty for a firefighters strike at Milwaukee. The battalion was released on 8 November 1973. On 8 July 1977, the 1st Battalion, 121st Field Artillery was called to state duty for a state employee strike. The battalion was sent to Taycheedah Correctional Institute near Fond du Lac. The battalion was released on 21 July 1977.

On 1 February 1980, the designation of Battery B was transferred during a statewide reorganization. The 1st Battalion, 127th Infantry was inactivated with Company C (-) at Sheboygan being reorganized as Detachment 1, Battery B, and Detachment 1, Company C at Plymouth becoming Battery B (-) of the 1st Battalion, 121st Field Artillery.

On 1 March 1981, the 1st Battalion, 121st Field Artillery was called to state duty for a firefighters strike in Milwaukee. The battalion was released on 2 March 1981, when an apparent contract settlement was reached. The battalion was recalled on 19 March 1981, when firefighters walked off the job again, and served until 21 March 1981.

On 1 August 1990, Battery C was moved from the Whitefish Bay Armory to Sussex and Battery A was moved to the Richards St Armory along with Headquarters Headquarters Battery. This was necessary to improve training conditions for the soldiers.

== Global war on terror ==
The regiment saw action as part of the United States' contribution to the global war on terror. In April 2006, the 1st Battalion 121st Field Artillery Regiment was mobilized in support of Operation Iraqi Freedom and moved to Camp Shelby, Mississippi. Following this the 121st was deployed to Iraq and Kuwait. During this deployment, 2 soldiers of the 121st were killed in action.

Between January 2009 and January 2010, the 1st Battalion 121st Field Artillery was again raised and began training at Fort Bliss, Texas. The Battalion was later deployed to Iraq.

The 1st Battalion 121st Field Artillery Regiment was mobilized between January and October 2013 at Fort Bliss, Texas before deployment to Afghanistan in support of Operation Enduring Freedom. The regiment again served in Afghanistan between April 2014 and January 2015.

In April 2018 the 1st Battalion 121st Field Artillery Regiment was mobilized in support of Operation Inherent Resolve, Operation Spartan Shield, and Operation Freedom Sentinel. As a result, the regiment saw deployment to Afghanistan, Iraq, Syria, Jordan, and the UAE.

== Conflicts ==
- World War I
- World War II
- Operation Iraqi Freedom 2006–2007
- War in Afghanistan 2013-2015
