= Bokoshe, Oklahoma =

Bokoshe, Oklahoma Bokushi (Choctaw)
- Town
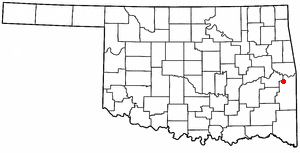
- Location of Bokoshe, Oklahoma
- Coordinates: 35°11′25″N 94°47′25″W
- Country: United States
- State: Oklahoma
- County: Le Flore

Area
  - Total: 0.55 sq mi (1.42 km^{2})
  - Land: 0.55 sq mi (1.42 km^{2})
  - Water: 0 sq mi (0.00 km^{2})
- Elevation: 538 ft (164 m)

Population (2020)
  - Total: 396
  - Density: 724.0/sq mi (279.53/km^{2})
- Time zone: UTC-6 (Central (CST))
  - Summer (DST): UTC-5 (CDT)
- ZIP code: 74930
- Area codes: 539/918
- FIPS code: 40-07450
- GNIS feature ID: 2411704

Bokoshe (/bəˈkoʊʃə/ bə-KOH-shə; Choctaw: Bokushi) is a town in Le Flore County, Oklahoma, United States. Bokoshe is a Choctaw word meaning "little creek". The population was 396 at the 2020 census, a 22.3% decrease over the figure of 510 recorded in 2010.

== History ==
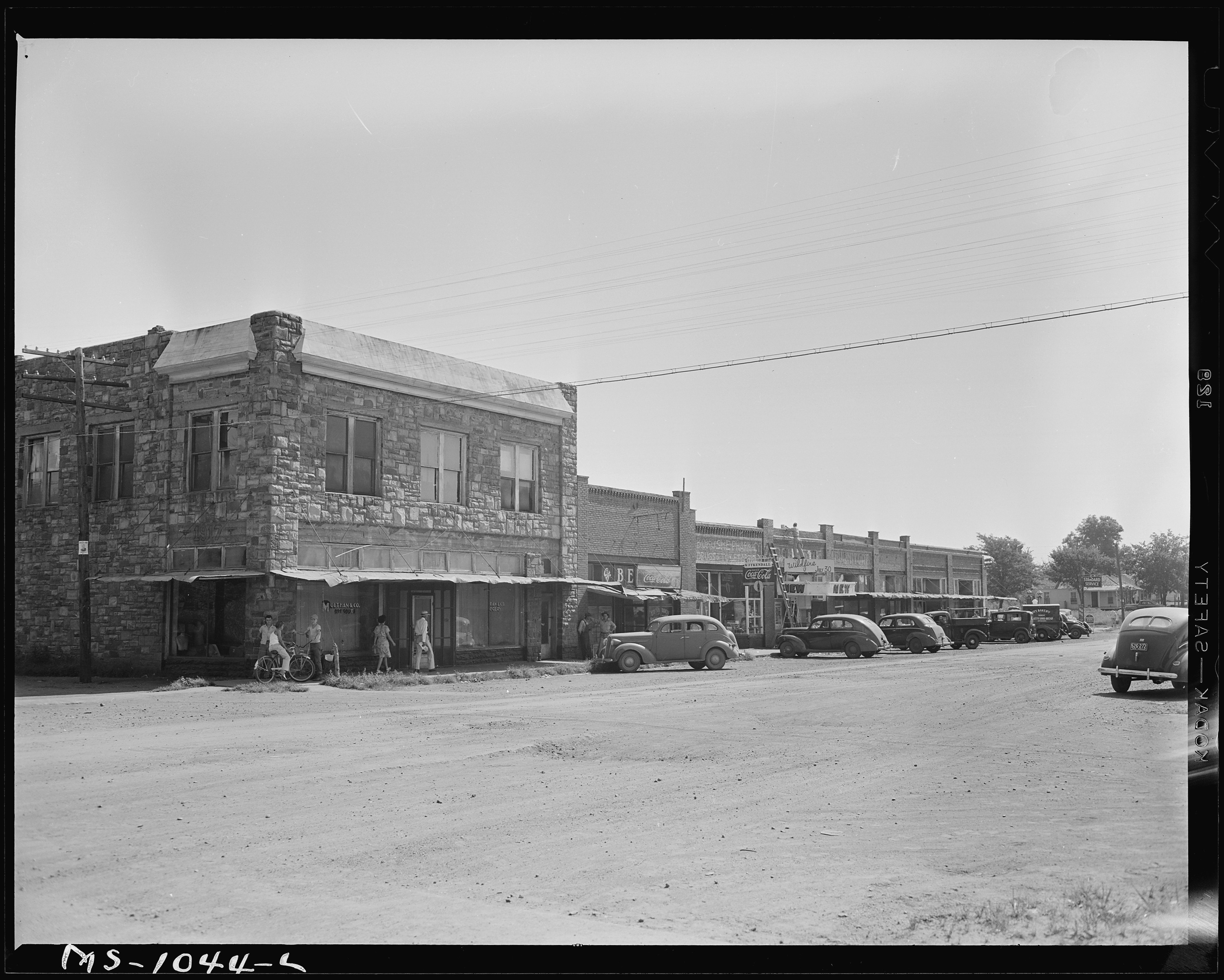
Main Street in Bokoshe (1946)

Bokoshe was a Choctaw settlement in 1886, when a post office was established, with William A. Sanner serving as the first Postmaster. At the time of its founding, Bokoshe was located in the Moshulatubbee District of the Choctaw Nation. The principal business was a coal mine that employed 10 miners. By 1900, the population was 153. The Fort Smith and Western Railway built tracks in 1901 to this area to ship the coal elsewhere. The Midland Valley Railroad built its own line in 1903-1904. The town moved south from its initial location to the intersection of the two railroads. Two other coal mines soon opened nearby, and the population grew to 483 by 1910. By 1920, the census reported a population of 869.

Bokoshe's mines fared better during the Great Depression than those elsewhere in the state. By 1930, the population had declined to 690, and continued dropping to 431 in 1960. The coal industry recovered and the town's population rebounded to 588 in 1970, then fell again to 403 in 1990. The population was 450 in 2000 and 512 in 2010.

On February 1, 1958, the town was the location of a train collision on the Midland Valley Railroad. Westbound train 41 collided head-on with eastbound train 42 on the curve at Bokoshe. Four crew members died and seven were injured. This was the only serious accident in the history of the Midland Valley system.

== Geography ==
According to the United States Census Bureau, the town has a total area of 0.5 square miles (1.3 km^{2}), all land.

== Demographics ==
Historical population
Census	Pop.	Note	%±
1900	153		—
1910	483		215.7%
1920	869		79.9%
1930	715		−17.7%
1940	690		−3.5%
1950	589		−14.6%
1960	431		−26.8%
1970	588		36.4%
1980	556		−5.4%
1990	403		−27.5%
2000	450		11.7%
2010	512		13.8%
2020	396		−22.7%
U.S. Decennial Census

=== 2020 census ===
As of the 2020 census, Bokoshe had a population of 396. The median age was 35.0 years. 29.0% of residents were under the age of 18 and 14.6% of residents were 65 years of age or older. For every 100 females there were 100.0 males, and for every 100 females age 18 and over there were 96.5 males age 18 and over.

0.0% of residents lived in urban areas, while 100.0% lived in rural areas.

There were 145 households in Bokoshe, of which 34.5% had children under the age of 18 living in them. Of all households, 45.5% were married-couple households, 17.2% were households with a male householder and no spouse or partner present, and 33.8% were households with a female householder and no spouse or partner present. About 26.9% of all households were made up of individuals and 10.3% had someone living alone who was 65 years of age or older.

There were 176 housing units, of which 17.6% were vacant. The homeowner vacancy rate was 6.7% and the rental vacancy rate was 5.4%.

Racial composition as of the 2020 census
Race	Number	Percent
White	247	62.4%
Black or African American	0	0.0%
American Indian and Alaska Native	111	28.0%
Asian	0	0.0%
Native Hawaiian and Other Pacific Islander	0	0.0%
Some other race	2	0.5%
Two or more races	36	9.1%
Hispanic or Latino (of any race)	11	2.8%

=== 2000 census ===
As of the census of 2000, 450 people, 174 households, and 121 families resided in the town. The population density was 844.4 inhabitants per square mile (326.0/km^{2}). The 218 housing units' average density was 409.1 per square mile (158.8/km^{2}). The racial makeup of the town was 74.00% White, 0.22% African American, 20.67% Native American, and 5.11% from two or more races. Latinos of any race were 0.22% of the population.

Of 174 households, 33.3% had children under the age of 18 living with them, 55.7% were married couples living together, 12.1% had a female householder with no husband present, and 29.9% were not families. Around 27.0% of all households were made up of individuals, and 16.1% had someone living alone who was 65 years of age or older. The average household size was 2.59 and the average family size was 3.11.

In the town, the population was distributed as 27.6% under the age of 18, 6.2% from 18 to 24, 27.8% from 25 to 44, 21.8% from 45 to 64, and 16.7% who were 65 years of age or older. The median age was 36 years. For every 100 females, there were 103.6 males. For every 100 females age 18 and over, there were 89.5 males.

The median income for a household in the town was $21,250, and for a family was $29,375. Males had a median income of $26,250 versus $17,813 for females. The per capita income for the town was $11,100. About 18.2% of families and 27.9% of the population were below the poverty line, including 42.2% of those under age 18 and 18.6% of those age 65 or over.

== Notable people ==
- George "Rube" Foster (1888–1976), American League baseball pitcher, retired to Bokoshe.
- William R. Shockley (1918–1945), awarded the Congressional Medal of Honor, was born in Bokoshe.
