= Theodore Steinmetz =

American musician

Theodore "Steinie" Steinmetz (December 22, 1880 – October 7, 1951) was an American musician, composer, and conductor from Marshfield, Wisconsin. During World War I, he was a member of the 32nd division Wisconsin infantry and wrote a march for the division that celebrates the combined brigades from Wisconsin and Michigan and their achievements in France for the Allied forces.

Theodore Steinmetz

The march was called the "32nd Division March" and is often heard in old movies. Mr. Steinmetz was also conductor of the Eau Claire Liberty Band (now known as the Eau Claire Municipal Band) and the 105th Cavalry Band. He was the longest serving musician in the Wisconsin National Guard.

The "32nd Division March" song:

Look out! Look out!
Here comes the Thirty Second
The mighty Thirty Second
The fighting Thirty Second
Look out! Look out!
They led the way in France
Red Arrows never glance
Though hell burn in advance
Yea! On Wisconsin On Wisconsin
Michigan My Michigan
We fight for liberty
For justice and equality
We are the Badgers and Wolverines.
