= 128th Infantry Regiment (United States) =

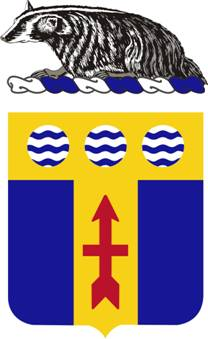
- 128th Infantry Regiment
- Active: 1861–present
- Country: United States
- Allegiance: Wisconsin
- Branch: United States Army
- Size: Regiment
- Nickname: Les Terribles (special designation)
- Motto: "Les Terribles" (The Terrible Ones)
- Engagements: American Civil War; Spanish–American War; Mexican Civil War; World War I World War II; Iraq War; Afghanistan War

Commanders
- Notable commanders: Robert Bruce McCoy

Insignia
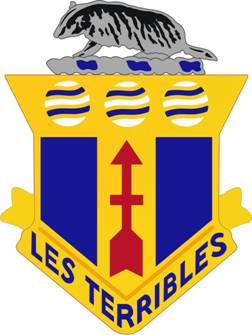
- Distinctive unit insignia

The 128th Infantry Regiment ("Les Terribles") is a United States military unit of the Wisconsin National Guard, currently represented by the 1st Battalion, 128th Infantry Regiment. The 128th has served as part of the American Civil War, Spanish–American War, Mexican Civil War, World War I, World War II, Iraq War and the Afghanistan War.

== History ==
=== Civil War ===
The 1st Battalion, 128th Infantry, traces its history to the spring of 1861, when the 2nd Wisconsin Infantry Regiment, comprising independent companies from throughout the state, was organized and mustered into federal service. The 2nd Wisconsin was joined by several other regiments to form the famous "Iron Brigade," which soon became one of the most feared and respected units on either side in the Civil War for its performance in such battles as Antietam and Gettysburg. Additionally, Eau Claire was home to the soldiers that comprised Company C of the 8th Wisconsin Volunteer Infantry Regiment, otherwise known as the "Eagle Regiment," because of its famous mascot "Old Abe," a pet bald eagle who accompanied the regiment into battle. The 8th Wisconsin fought in the Western Theater at places such as Vicksburg, Mississippi

=== Spanish-American War ===
In 1898, four infantry regiments from Wisconsin made up of Guardsmen and volunteers were formed and activated at the outbreak of the Spanish–American War. During the brief conflict, Wisconsin Guardsmen participated in the capture of Puerto Rico. A letter from a member of the 2nd Wisconsin describes some of the details of the guardsmen's role in the conflict:

"We landed here at Ponce Friday without opposition by the Spaniards. They fled to the hills when we came in sight. But it has been skirmish every day since we landed. We have captured 200 prisoners. The 3rd Wisconsin [National Guard] got into battle yesterday and one man was wounded in the hip, and one of the Massachusetts boys got shot in the neck, and went a mile, and a half before he fell. There was a skirmish last night but have heard of no one being wounded, or killed."

Three members of the Wisconsin Infantry Regiments died of fever:

- Captain Dawson of Company F from Merrill died Anniston, Alabama 29 October 1898 of typhoid fever which was preceded by pneumonia.
- Alfred G. Thoreson, age 21 from Dane County of Co M, 3rd Wisconsin Infantry died of yellow fever on Hospital Ship "Relief" at sea between Puerto Rico and Philadelphia; buried at sea.
- Fred R. Goodhouse of Mauston Company died 31 October 1898 of heart failure following yellow fever on Hospital Ship "Relief" night before the "Relief" docked at Philadelphia.

=== Pancho Villa Expedition and World War I ===
In 1916, Wisconsin infantry units served with General Pershing to chase Pancho Villa along the Texas border and into northern Mexico. The Wisconsin troops were again activated in 1917 as the United States declared war on Germany. After a period of intensive training, the Wisconsin Guardsmen were redesignated as the 128th Infantry, assigned to the 32nd Division and sent to France. In the closing months of the war, the 128th Infantry participated in several major campaigns including Alsace, Aisne-Marne, Oise-Aisne and Meuse-Argonne. For their fury in combat, the nickname "Les Terribles" or "The Terrible Ones" was given to them by the French. As they pierced the famed Hindenburg Line, the 32d Infantry Division became known as the "Red Arrow" Division – a name that has remained to the present day and is reflected in shoulder patch.

=== Interwar period ===
The 128th Infantry arrived at the port of New York on 5 May 1919 on the USS George Washington and was demobilized 19 May 1919 at Camp Grant, Illinois. Per the terms of the National Defense Act of 1920, the 128th Infantry was reconstituted in the National Guard in 1921, assigned to the 32nd Division, and allotted to the state of Wisconsin. The 128th Infantry was reorganized and federally recognized on 16 April 1921 with headquarters at West Salem, Wisconsin. The headquarters was successively relocated as follows: Superior, Wisconsin, in 1923; Milwaukee, Wisconsin, in 1925; Menomonie, Wisconsin, 20 February 1929; Sparta, Wisconsin, 14 April 1930; and to the Wisconsin Veteran's Home, Oshkosh, Wisconsin, 3 November 1931. The regiment, or elements thereof, was called up to perform the following state duties: three companies to perform riot control during the “Milk Strike” at Shawano, Wisconsin, 15–20 May 1933; Headquarters 1st Battalion and three companies to perform strike duty during labor disturbances at Kohler, Wisconsin, 28 July–20 August 1934. The regiment conducted annual summer training most years at Camp Douglas, Wisconsin, 1921–27, and Camp Williams, Wisconsin, 1928–39. In 1928, the regiment conducted joint summer training at Camp Douglas with the 101st Division's 404th Infantry Regiment.

=== World War II ===
The 128th was called to federal service on 15 October 1940. After training in Louisiana, the unit was moved by convoy to Port Adelaide, Australia. In 1942 the 128th, as part of the 32nd, broke through the Japanese lines at the Battle of Buna ("Bloody Buna"), New Guinea; in 1944 defeated Japanese General Adachi's divisions at Saidor and Aitape, New Guinea; defeated the Japanese Imperial First Marines in Leyte (Imperial First Marines only loss in 200 years); and pierced the Yamashita Line in Luzon. The 128th Regiment and 32d Division were still in combat action when the cease fire order came on 15 August 1945. The 32d Infantry Division had been in combat 654 days – more than any United States division in any war.

When the cold war peaked with the Soviet blockade of Berlin in October 1961, President Kennedy became the third United States president in the 20th Century to call the 128th, as part of the 32d Infantry Division, to federal active service. The division trained at Ft. Lewis, WA, for 10 months, maintaining a high level of readiness until the crisis abated. In August 1962 its soldiers returned home and resumed their status as Wisconsin National Guardsmen.

The 2nd Battalion, 128th Infantry, was formed as a result of the transitioning of the 32d Infantry Brigade from a mechanized unit to a separate light infantry brigade in September 2001. It was reorganized as the 1st Squadron, 105th Cavalry Regiment on 1 September 2007 when the 32nd became a modular brigade.

== Distinctive unit insignia ==
- Description

A metal and enamel device 1 1/16 inches (2.7 cm) in height overall consisting of a shield blazoned as follows: Azure, on a pale Or the shoulder sleeve insignia of the 32nd Division Proper (a Red arrow having shot through a line), on a chief of the second three fountains. Attached above on a wreath of the colors Or and Azure, a badger couchant Proper. Attached below and to the sides a Gold scroll inscribed "LES TERRIBLES" in Blue letters.

- Symbolism

The shield is blue for Infantry. The pale, dividing the shield into thirds, alludes to three of the major offensive engagements in which the organization as an element of the 32nd Division participated in World War I. The red arrow is the design of the shoulder sleeve insignia of the 32d Division. Traditionally, the word "Wisconsin" means "wild rushing waters," thus the three fountains, heraldic symbols for water, appropriately stand for the Wisconsin Army National Guard regiments: First, Second and Third, from which elements stemmed to make up the organization during World War I. The motto translates to "The Terrible Ones."

- Background

The distinctive unit insignia was approved on 15 March 1926. It was amended to revise the description on 20 April 1926.

== Coat of arms ==
- Blazon
  - Shield – Azure, on a pale Or the shoulder sleeve insignia of the 32nd Division Proper (a Red arrow having shot through a line), on a chief of the second three fountains.
  - Crest – That for the regiments and separate battalions of the Wisconsin Army National Guard: On a wreath of the colors Or and Azure, a badger couchant Proper.
  - Motto LES TERRIBLES (The Terrible Ones).
- Symbolism
  - Shield – The shield is blue for Infantry. The pale, dividing the shield into thirds, alludes to three of the major offensive engagements in which the organization as an element of the 32d Division participated in World War I. The red arrow is the design of the shoulder sleeve insignia of the 32d Division. Traditionally, the word "Wisconsin" means "wild rushing waters," thus the three fountains, heraldic symbols for water, appropriately stand for the Wisconsin Army National Guard regiments: First, Second and Third, from which elements stemmed to make up the organization during World War I.
  - Crest – The crest is that of the Wisconsin Army National Guard.
- Background – The coat of arms was approved on 25 March 1926. It was amended to revise the blazon of the shield on 20 April 1926.
