= 120th Field Artillery Regiment =

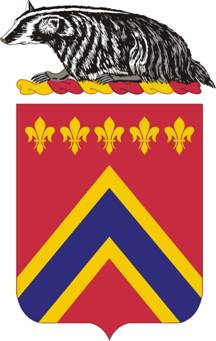
- Coat of arms
- Country: (United States)
- Branch: United States Army
- Type: Field artillery
- Role: USARS parent regiment
- Size: regiment

Insignia
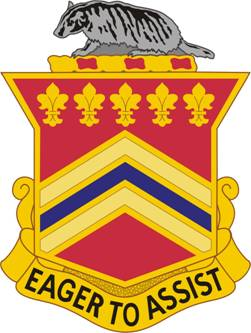
- Distinctive unit insignia

The 120th Field Artillery Regiment is a field artillery regiment of the Wisconsin Army National Guard.

The regiment's 1st Battalion, its only active element, is the cannon battalion assigned to the 32nd Infantry Brigade Combat Team.

== Lineage and honors ==
=== Lineage ===
- Organized May–June 1917 in the Wisconsin National Guard in southeastern and central Wisconsin as the 2d and 3d Squadrons, 1st Cavalry.
- Mustered into Federal service 31 July 1917 at Camp Douglas, Wisconsin; drafted into Federal service 5 August 1917.
- Consolidated 28 September 1917 with the 1st Squadron, 1st Cavalry (organized 26 April 1880 at Milwaukee as the Light Horse Squadron); consolidated unit concurrently converted and redesignated as the 120th Field Artillery and assigned to the 32d Division.
- Demobilized 16 May 1919 at Camp Grant, Illinois.
- Former 2d and 3d Squadrons, 1st Cavalry, reconstituted 26 November 1919 in the Wisconsin National Guard as the 2d Field Artillery.
- Reorganized 8 May 1920 – 9 February 1921 in central Wisconsin.
- Redesignated 1 April 1921 as the 120th Field Artillery and assigned to the 32d Division.
- Headquarters Federally recognized 18 May 1922 at Milwaukee.
- Inducted into Federal service 15 October 1940 at home stations.
- Regiment (less 2d Battalion) reorganized and redesignated 1 February 1942 as the 120th Field Artillery Battalion, an element of the 32d Infantry Division; 2d Battalion concurrently reorganized and redesignated as the 129th Field Artillery Battalion, an element of the 32d Infantry Division.
- 120th and 129th Field Artillery Battalions inactivated 28 February 1946 in Japan.
- 120th and 129th Field Artillery Battalions consolidated, reorganized, and Federally recognized 9 June 1947 in central Wisconsin as the 120th Field Artillery Battalion, an element of the 32d Infantry Division, with headquarters at Stevens Point.
- Reorganized and redesignated 15 February 1959 as the 120th Artillery, a parent regiment under the Combat Arms Regimental System, to consist of the 1st and 2d Howitzer Battalions, elements of the 32d Infantry Division.

(1st and 2d Howitzer Battalions ordered into active Federal service 15 October 1961 at home stations; released 10 August 1962 from active Federal service and reverted to state control.)

- Reorganized 1 April 1963 to consist of the 1st and 2d Battalions, elements of the 32d Infantry Division.
- Reorganized 30 December 1967 to consist of the 1st Battalion, an element of the 32d Infantry Brigade.
- Redesignated 1 May 1972 as the 120th Field Artillery.
- Withdrawn 21 July 1987 from the Combat Arms Regimental System and reorganized under the United States Army Regimental System.
- Reorganized 1 October 1997 to consist of the 1st Battalion, an element of the 34th Infantry Division.
- Reorganized 1 September 2003 to consist of the 1st Battalion, an element of the 32d Infantry Brigade.

=== Campaign participation credit ===
- World War I: Aisne-Marne; Oise-Aisne; Meuse-Argonne; Alsace 1918; Champagne 1918
- World War II: New Guinea (with arrowhead); Leyte; Luzon

Battery A (Marshfield), 1st Battalion, additionally entitled to:
- War with Spain: Puerto Rico
- World War II–AP: Papua

Battery B (Clintonville), 1st Battalion, additionally entitled to:
- World War II–AP: Papua

=== Decorations ===
- Presidential Unit Citation (Army), Streamer embroidered AITAPE (129th Field Artillery Battalion cited; WD GO 76, 1946)
- French Croix de Guerre with Silver Star, World War I, Streamer embroidered AISNE-MARNE and OISE-AISNE (120th Field Artillery cited; WD GO 11, 1924)
- Philippine Presidential Unit Citation, Streamer embroidered 17 OCTOBER 1944 TO 4 JULY 1950 (120th and 129th Field Artillery Battalions cited; DA GO 47, 1950)

Battery A (Marshfield), 1st Battalion, additionally entitled to:
- Presidential Unit Citation (Army), Streamer embroidered PAPUA (Papuan Forces, United States Army, Southwest Pacific Area, cited; WD GO 21, 1943)
- Presidential Unit Citation (Army), Streamer embroidered LUZON (1st Battalion, 128th Infantry, WD GO 74, 1946)
- French Croix de Guerre with Palm, World War I, Streamer embroidered OISE-AISNE (128th Infantry cited; WD GO 11, 1924)

Battery B (Clintonville), 1st Battalion, additionally entitled to:
- Presidential Unit Citation (Army), Streamer embroidered PAPUA (Papuan Forces, United States Army, Southwest Pacific Area, cited; WD GO 21, 1943)
- Meritorious Unit Commendation (Army), Streamer embroidered PACIFIC THEATER (32d Quartermaster Company cited; GO 289, 32d Infantry Division, 1 September 1945)

== Heraldry ==
=== Distinctive unit insignia ===
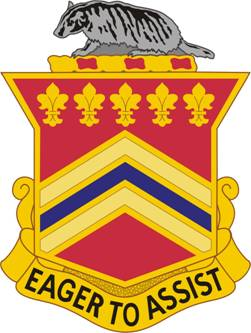

=== Coat of arms ===
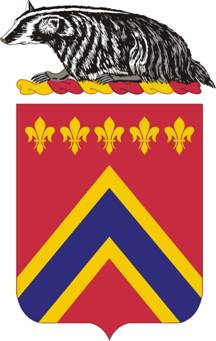

== See also ==
- Field Artillery Branch (United States)
- Army National Guard
- National Guard of the United States
