= USS LST-457 =

1942 LST-1-class tank landing ship

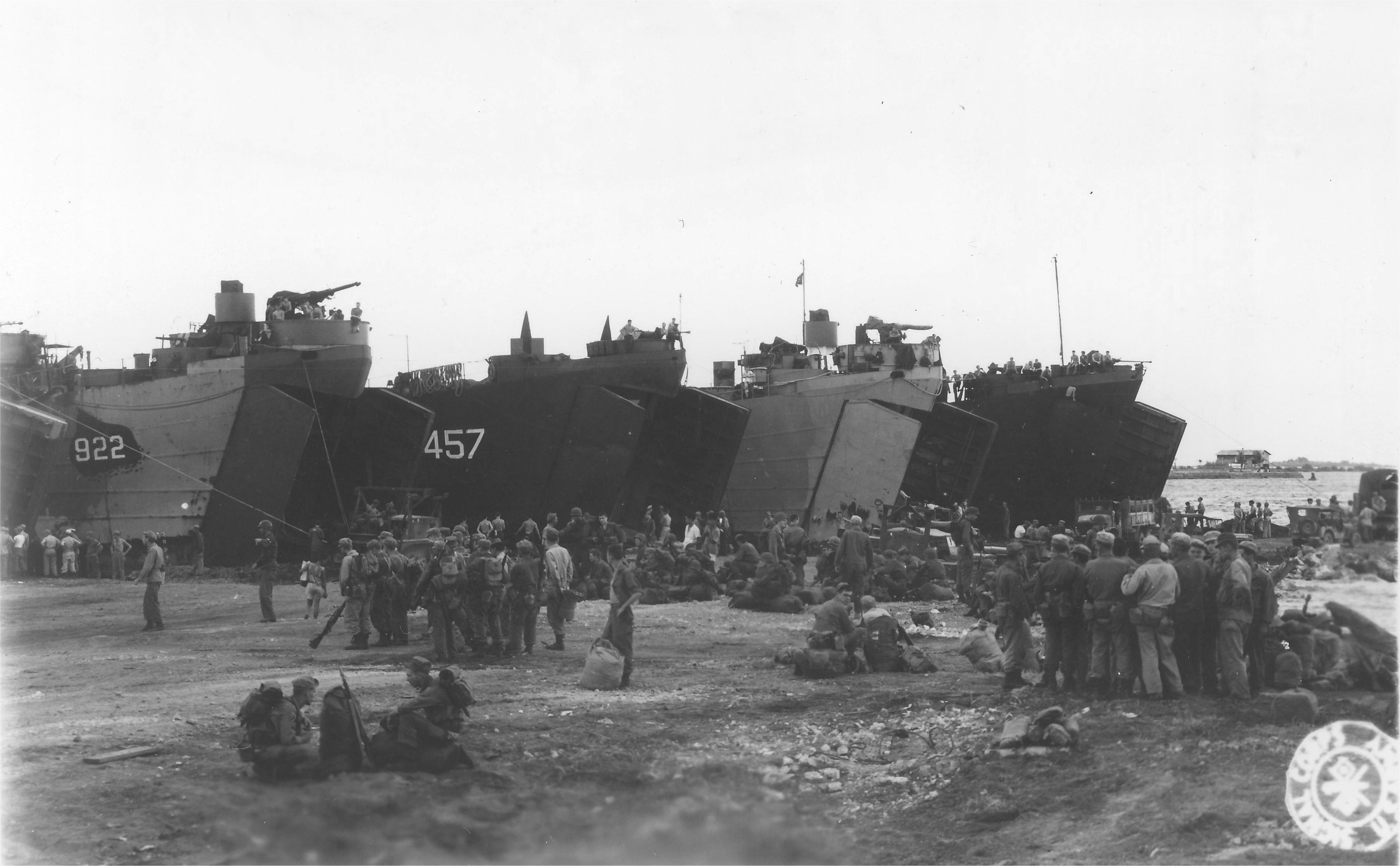
- USS LST-457 and USS LST-922, along with several other LSTs unloading at a pier that was built in one day by Army Engineers at Cebu City, P.I., 3 April 1945.

History

United States
- Name: LST-457
- Ordered: as a Type S3-M-K2 hull, MCE hull 977
- Builder: Kaiser Shipbuilding Company, Vancouver, Washington
- Yard number: 161
- Laid down: 3 August 1942
- Launched: 23 October 1942
- Commissioned: 10 February 1943
- Decommissioned: 15 March 1946
- Stricken: 29 September 1947
- Identification: Hull symbol: LST-457; Code letters: NFJZ
- Honors and awards: 7 × battle stars
- Fate: assigned to Commander Naval Forces Far East

Japan
- Operator: Shipping Control Authority for Japan
- In service: 15 March 1946
- Out of service: date unknown
- Renamed: Q098
- Fate: Sold for scrapping, 20 April 1948

General characteristics
- Class & type: LST-1-class tank landing ship
- Displacement: 4,080 long tons (4,145 t) full load; 2,160 long tons (2,190 t) landing
- Length: 328 ft (100 m) oa
- Beam: 50 ft (15 m)
- Draft: Full load: 8 ft 2 in (2.49 m) forward; 14 ft 1 in (4.29 m) aft; Landing at 2,160 t: 3 ft 11 in (1.19 m) forward; 9 ft 10 in (3.00 m) aft
- Installed power: 2 × 900 hp (670 kW) Electro-Motive Diesel 12-567A diesel engines; 1,700 shp (1,300 kW)
- Propulsion: 1 × Falk main reduction gears; 2 × Propellers
- Speed: 12 kn (22 km/h; 14 mph)
- Range: 24,000 nmi (44,000 km; 28,000 mi) at 9 kn (17 km/h; 10 mph) while displacing 3,960 long tons (4,024 t)
- Boats & landing craft carried: 2 or 6 x LCVPs
- Capacity: 2,100 tons oceangoing maximum; 350 tons main deckload
- Troops: 16 officers, 147 enlisted men
- Complement: 13 officers, 104 enlisted men
- Armament: Varied, ultimate armament; 2 × twin 40 mm (1.57 in) Bofors guns; 4 × single 40 mm Bofors guns; 12 × 20 mm (0.79 in) Oerlikon cannons

Service record
- Operations: Eastern New Guinea operation; Lae occupation (4–5 September 1943); Saidor occupation (28–30 January and 17–19, 21–23, 25–28 February 1944); Bismarck Archipelago operation; Cape Gloucester, New Britain (26–29 December 1943, 30 December 1943–2 January 1944, 3–9, 15–19, 23–27 January, and 13–16 February 1944); Admiralty Islands landings (25–28 February and 11–15 March 1944); Hollandia operation (21–25 April 1944); Western New Guinea operation; Toem-Wakde-Sarmi area operation (17–18 and 23–25 May 1944); Biak Islands operation (28–31 May and 3–7, 13–16 June 1944); Noemfoor Island operation (2–4 July 1944); Morotai landing (15 September 1944); Leyte landings (5–18 November 1944); Visayan Island landings (26 March, 2, 10–11 and 20 April 1945); Balikpapan operation (26 June–4 July 1945)
- Awards: American Campaign Medal; Asiatic–Pacific Campaign Medal; World War II Victory Medal; Navy Occupation Service Medal w/Asia Clasp; Philippine Republic Presidential Unit Citation; Philippine Liberation Medal

USS LST-457 was a United States Navy LST-1-class tank landing ship used in the Asiatic-Pacific Theater during World War II.

== Construction ==
LST-457 was laid down on 3 August 1942, under Maritime Commission (MARCOM) contract, MC hull 977, by Kaiser Shipyards, Vancouver, Washington; launched on 23 October 1942; and commissioned on 6 February 1943.

== Service history ==
During the war, LST-457 was assigned to the Pacific Theater of Operations. She took part in the Eastern New Guinea operations, the Lae occupation in September 1943, and the Saidor occupation in January and February 1944; the Bismarck Archipelago operations, the Cape Gloucester, New Britain, landings from December 1943 through February 1944, and the Admiralty Islands landings in March 1944; the Hollandia operation in April 1944; the Western New Guinea operations, the Toem-Wakde-Sarmi area operation in May 1944, the Biak Islands operation in May and June 1944, the Noemfoor Island operation in July 1944, and the Morotai landing in September 1944; the Visayan Island landings March and April 1945; and the Balikpapan operation in June and July 1945.

== Post-war service ==
Following the war, LST-457 performed occupation duty in the Far East until mid-October 1945. She returned to the United States and was decommissioned on 15 March 1946. The ship was struck from the Navy list on 29 September 1947. On 20 April 1948, she was sold to the Bethlehem Steel Co., of Bethlehem, Pennsylvania, and subsequently scrapped.

== Honors and awards ==
LST-457 earned seven battle stars for her World War II service.

== Notes ==
Citations

== Bibliography ==
Online resources

- "LST-457". Dictionary of American Naval Fighting Ships. Naval History and Heritage Command. This article incorporates text from this source, which is in the public domain.
- "Kaiser Vancouver, Vancouver WA". www.ShipbuildingHistory.com. 27 November 2010.
- "USS LST-457". NavSource. 10 October 2014.
