= William H. Gill =

United States Army general (1886–1976)

William Hanson Gill
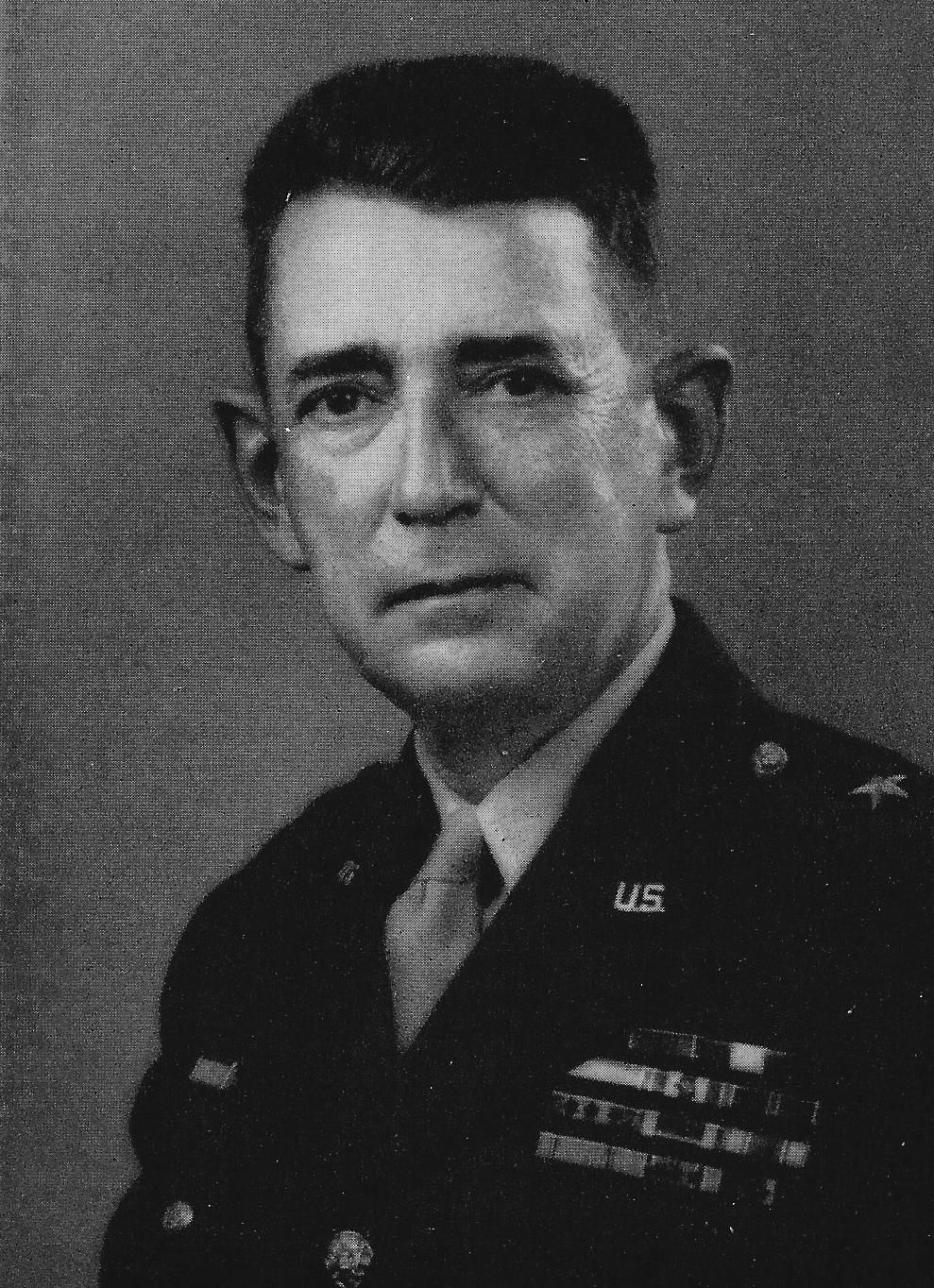
- MG William H. Gill
- Born: August 7, 1886; Unison, Virginia, US
- Died: January 17, 1976 (aged 89); Colorado Springs, Colorado, US
- Burial place: Evergreen Cemetery (Colorado Springs, Colorado)
- Military career
- Branch: United States Army
- Service years: 1912–1946
- Rank: Major General
- Service number: 0-3287
- Unit: Infantry Branch
- Commands: 32nd Infantry Division; 89th Infantry Division; 27th Infantry Regiment
- Conflicts: World War I; Battle of Saint-Mihiel; Meuse-Argonne Offensive; World War II; New Guinea campaign; Western New Guinea campaign; Battle of Driniumor River; Philippines campaign; Battle of Leyte; Battle of Luzon; Villa Verde campaign; Occupation of Japan
- Awards: Distinguished Service Cross; Army Distinguished Service Medal; Silver Star (2); Legion of Merit; Bronze Star Medal
- Other work: President, Colorado College

William Hanson Gill (August 7, 1886 – January 17, 1976) was a highly decorated officer in the United States Army during World War II. Originally a civil engineer, Gill entered the army in 1912 and served with infantry units throughout his career. He rose to the general's rank during World War II and commanded 32nd Infantry Division in the South Pacific Theater until the end of War.

Following his retirement from the army in 1946, Gill was elected president of Colorado College in Colorado Springs, Colorado and remained in that capacity until 1955.

== Early years ==
=== Civil career ===
William H. Gill was born on August 7, 1886, in Unison, Virginia as the son of civil engineer and Loudoun County treasurer John Love Gill and his wife Sue Veturia Leith. He graduated from the Randolph-Macon Academy in Front Royal, Virginia in summer 1903 and entered the Virginia Military Institute (VMI) in Lexington, Virginia. While at the VMI, Gill was active in football and track; was a member of the Mandolin and Guitar Club and reached the rank of Cadet-Sergeant. He also served as an Art Editor of "The Bomb", a class yearbook.

Upon graduation from VMI with Bachelor of Science degree in Civil engineering in summer 1907, Gill was employed for two years as Civil Engineer by the Chicago, Milwaukee & Puget Sound Railway Company and while in that assignment, he participated in putting the railroad through Montana, Idaho and Washington. He returned to his hometown in 1910 and became acting treasurer of Loudoun County. While in that capacity, Gill entered the Virginia National Guard and was commissioned captain in Company H, 1st Virginia Infantry. In 1911, he was employed by the Peoples National Bank in Leesburg, Virginia as bookkeeper.

=== First Army assignments ===
Gill entered the United States Army on June 1, 1912, and was commissioned Second lieutenant of Infantry on that date. He was assigned as Platoon leader to the Company "A", 21st Infantry Regiment at Vancouver Barracks, Washington and also served simultaneously as an instructor of Post Military Schools. Gill remained in that assignment until June 1915, when he embarked for the Philippines.

In July 1915, Gill joined the headquarters of 1st, Battalion, 8th Infantry Regiment at Fort William McKinley in Manila and served as Battalion Quartermaster until July 1916, when he was promoted to first lieutenant and appointed Commander of the regimental Supply company. He later served with the regimental Machine gun company and upon promotion to captain in May 1917, just weeks after the American entry into World War I, Gill returned to the United States.

=== World War I ===
He was stationed on Camp Fremont, California until December 1917, when he was transferred to Camp Logan, Houston, Texas and joined the newly organized 5th Division. Gill served as an Adjutant of Divisional Provost Marshal, Colonel William M. Morrow and embarked for France in May 1918. He arrived to Bordeaux two weeks later and was promoted to the temporary rank of Major in the National Army in June that year.

Gill was stationed on various training areas with 5th Division and assumed duty as Divisional Provost Marshal in August 1918. He served in that capacity during the Battle of Saint-Mihiel and assumed command of 1st Battalion, 6th Infantry Regiment by the end of the same month. Gill led his battalion during the Meuse–Argonne offensive in late 1918 and received Silver Star citation for leadership in combat. Upon the Armistice of 11 November 1918, he marched with the regiment to the Rhineland via Luxembourg for occupation duty and his battalion was responsible for care of allied prisoners-of-war released by the German Army.

== Interwar period ==
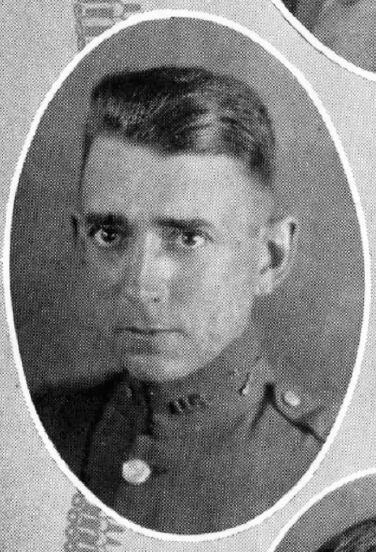
William H. Gill as captain in 1920s.

The units of 5th Division sailed back to the United States in July 1919 and Gill was transferred to Richmond, Virginia where he assumed duty as an Instructor with the Virginia National Guard. He remained in that capacity until the end of August 1923, when he entered the Army Infantry School at Fort Benning, Georgia. Gill completed the Advanced Infantry Officers' Course in June 1924 and entered another course at Army Command and General Staff School at Fort Leavenworth, Kansas.

Upon the graduation as Honor Graduate in June 1925, Gill remained at the school and served as an instructor in the Command and Training Section for three years, being promoted to the permanent rank of Major in July 1929. He was ordered to the Army War College in Washington, D.C. in September that year and upon graduation following June, Gill assumed duty as Commanding Officer, 2nd Battalion, 30th Infantry Regiment at Presidio of San Francisco, California.

In October 1931, Gill was ordered back to Washington, D.C. for General Staff Duty and was appointed Chief of Troop Training Section, Organization and Training Division (G-3), War Department General Staff. Following the promotion to lieutenant colonel in August 1935, Gill was transferred to Fort Benning, Georgia and assumed duty as Commanding Officer, 1st Battalion, 29th Infantry Regiment.

Gill remained in that assignment for a year, before embarked for new duty in Hawaii in November 1936. He joined the headquarters of 27th Infantry Regiment at Schofield Barracks and served as a Regimental Executive Officer under Colonel Ambrose R. Emery. While in this capacity, Gill also held additional duty as a permanent member of a board to prepare plans for Hawaiian Division training exercise. When Colonel Emery was transferred for new assignment in mid-August 1938, Gill assumed temporary command of the regiment, before Colonel Edwin F. Harding assumed command one month later. He then resuming his duty as an Executive officer.

By late October 1938, Gill was ordered to the University of California at Berkeley where he assumed duty as Professor of Military Science and Tactics and Commandant of Reserve Officers' Training Corps unit. He remained there for two years and returned to the Army War College in Washington, D.C. as an Instructor and Executive Officer, Army War College in Washington, D.C.

Upon his promotion to colonel in mid-October 1940, Gill was ordered to Fort Jackson, South Carolina where he assumed duty as Chief of Staff, 8th Infantry Division. He was co-responsible for initial organization and training of the division under Major general James P. Marley.

== World War II ==
Due to expansion of the United States Army in the Eve of the United States' entry into World War II, Gill was promoted to the temporary rank of brigadier general by the end of October 1941, and assumed command of 55th Infantry Brigade, a part of the National Guard 28th Infantry Division under Major general Edward Martin.

His leadership abilities were recognized by superiors and Gill was promoted to the temporary rank of major general on May 24, 1942. He was subsequently ordered to Fort Carson, Colorado and assumed command of 89th Infantry Division. Gill supervised the activation of the division and its initial training and while in this capacity, he also completed Army Motor Transport School at Fort Holabird, Maryland.

=== South Pacific ===
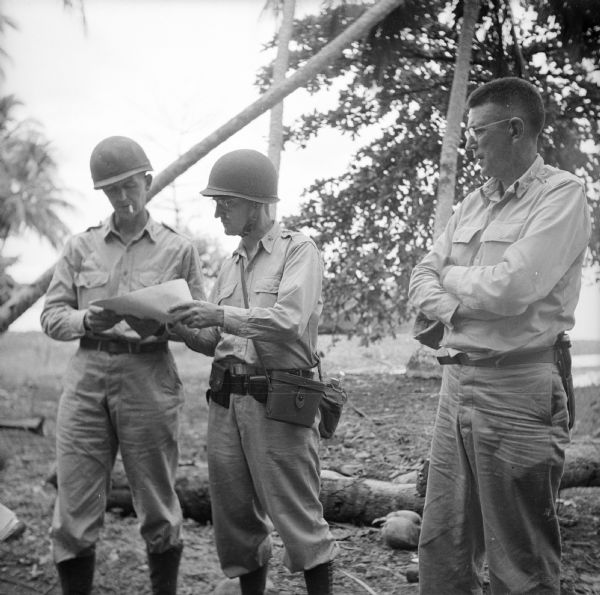
Gill (right) with his Assistant division commander, BG Clarence A. Martin (center) and Division Artillery commander BG Robert B. McBride during the field briefing at New Guinea in summer of 1944.

=== Training of the division ===
Although Gill was slightly too old for combat command (he was 56 at the time), he was selected as new commanding general of 32nd Infantry Division ("The Red Arrow Division") located on New Guinea within South West Pacific Area under General Douglas MacArthur. The 32nd Division sustained heavy casualties during the fighting on Buna–Gona in late 1942 and MacArthur relieved Major general Edwin F. Harding for lack of aggressiveness.

Gill knew Harding from his service in Hawaii back in 1938 and his mission was difficult. The 32nd Division was originally scheduled for the service in European Theater of Operations and thus had no jungle warfare training. Moreover, of the 9,825 men of the Division who entered combat, the division suffered 2,520 battle casualties, including 586 killed in action. The men were also struggling with malaria, dengue fever and tropical dysetry.

Based on that, Gill assumed command just after division's arrival back to Brisbane, Australia in March 1943. He then supervised the re-equipment and retraining of the Division for next campaigns in South Pacific until mid-October 1943, when he moved with the division back to New Guinea. At Milne Bay and Goodenough Island they continued their training and prepared for future combat operations.

=== New Guinea ===
Gill and his division finally received orders to deploy into combat in early January 1944. Their goal was to take part in the Landing at Saidor, a village on the north coast of Papua New Guinea. The Division was selected by Generals MacArthur and Walter Krueger (Commanding General, Sixth Army) and its primary objective was the capture of the airstrip at Saidor which will allow construction of an airbase to assist Allied air forces to conduct operations against Japanese bases at Wewak and Hollandia. Secondary objective was to cut off the 6,000 Imperial Japanese troops retreating from Sio in the face of the Australian advance from Finschhafen. Gill took part in the planning of the assault and selected his assistant division, Brigadier general Clarence A. Martin to lead a task force.

The operation lasted for one month and the 32nd Division suffered only 75 battle casualties, including 43 killed in action. The Japanese troops lost over 1,000 men and Allies were able to construct an airfield by the end of March 1944 and allied bombers began conducting night attacks on Hollandia.

In April 1944, the 32nd Division was selected by MacArthur and Krueger to take part in the Landing at Aitape to isolate the Japanese 18th Army at Wewak. After two weeks of fighting, Aitape was secured with 550 casualties on Japanese side in contrast to 60 Allied casualties. However the retreating 20,000 men of Japanese 18th Army were about to attack Aitape and Gill prepared defensive plan and ordered his division to dig in. He then called for reinforcements, but Krueger nor MacArthur were not happy with Gill's request, but the help was sent anyway. Unfortunately Gill remained passive until the beginning of July, holding his position behind well prepared fortifications, believing the Japanese would launch a counteroffensive. Krueger originally wanted Gill's forces to pursue and annihilate Japanese forces in the jungle, but following this situation, Gill, who was until then considered by Krueger a potential Corps commander, had lost his chances.

Krueger then dispatched Major general Charles P. Hall, Commanding general, XI Corps, to Aitape to assume operational command. Hall arrived with staff and after analysis of the situation, he dispatched part of his troops to Driniumor River to search for Japanese troops. Gill was not happy with that move and had little respect for Hall and his staff. His concerns were proven partially right, when due to dividing of the U.S. forces, Japanese Army broke through the first lines of defense. The Allied forces subsequently consolidated their forces and drove out Japanese from retaking Aitape. They suffered approximately 10,000 casualties while U.S. forces had 3,000 of killed in action, wounded and missing.

In mid-September 1944, Gill and his division then took part in the Battle of Morotai, an island intended to be used as a base to support the planned liberation of the Philippines later that year. The invading forces greatly outnumbered the island's Japanese defenders and secured their objectives in two weeks. The 32nd Division then established his command post at Hollandia, Dutch New Guinea, setting the stage for the advance into the Philippines. For his service on New Guinea, Gill received Legion of Merit.

=== Leyte ===
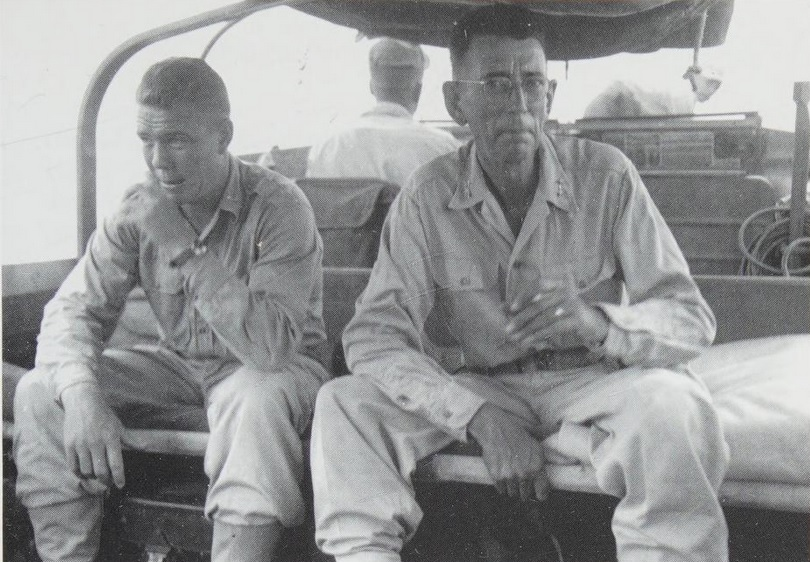
Gill (right) and his aide Captain William F. Barres on Luzon, Philippines in February 1945.

The Allied forces launched their liberation of the Philippines in late October 1944 with the amphibious landing in Leyte and the goal of the campaign was to recapture and liberate the entire Philippine Archipelago and to end almost three years of Japanese occupation. Gill and his division were held in the Sixth Army reserves until mid-November 1944, when Franklin C. Sibert, Commanding general, X Corps called up Gill's division into combat.

Gill and his division were tasked to relieve heavily depleted 24th Infantry Division under Major general Frederick Augustus Irving during its drive on Ormoc in the northern part of Leyte. The 24th Division spent three days of heavy fighting and Sibert became unsatisfied with division's progress and relieved Irving of his command. Gill struggled the same way as Irving did during the fighting on Ormoc, but remained in command of his division due to his close relationship with Sibert. They both served as battalion commanders with 29th Infantry Regiment at Fort Benning, Georgia back in 1934–1935.

The 32nd Division then took Limon and smashed the General Tomoyuki Yamashita line in bitter hand-to-hand combat. The division linked up with elements of the U.S. 1st Cavalry Division in the vicinity of Lonoy, on December 22, 1944, marking the collapse of Japanese resistance in the upper Ormoc Valley. The division remained on the front lines until the Japanese resistance on Leyte was broken near the end of December. For his service on Leyte, Gill was decorated with second Silver Star.

=== Luzon ===
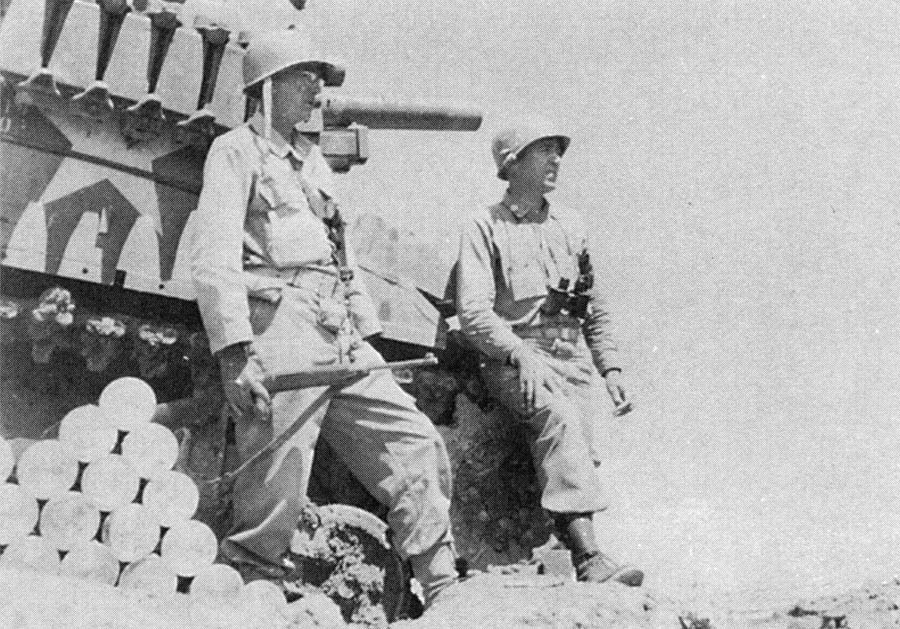
Major General Gill, CG 32nd Infantry Division, and Lieutenant Colonel Frank W. Murphy, CO 127th Infantry, observing fire of an M-7 105mm Self-propelled Gun shelling enemy positions on Yamashita Ridge along the Villa Verde Trail, May 1945.

After a month of mopping up operations on Leyte, Gill led his division to Luzon on January 27, 1945. The 32nd Division then participated in the fighting east of Lingayen Gulf before it was tasked with capture of Villa Verde trail in the Northern Luzon's sharp-ridged Caraballo Mountains and link up with 25th Infantry Division under Major general Charles L. Mullins in the vicinity of Santa Fe, thus securing Balete Pass.

His division suffered heavy casualties during the campaign with 825 Killed in action and 2,160 wounded. About 6,000 soldiers were treated for illness, disease, or combat fatigue. Japanese losses were estimated of at least 5,750 dead out of 8,750 defenders. Gill, would later say that cost of the battle was too high for what was achieved. Due to exhaustion following a twenty-two months of deployment in Pacific, Gill also suffered a breakdown from exhaustion and physically abused a number of officers and enlisted men. General Sibert helped his friend Gill again and ordered him to the field hospital for treatment, allowing him to retain command of the division. For his service on Villa Verde trail, Gill was decorated with Distinguished Service Cross, the second highest military decorated of the United States Army.

The 32nd Division then conducted mopping up operations on Luzon until the end of war. Despite Surrender of Japan on August 15, 1945, when all hostilities were supposed to end, General Yamashita continued fighting until September 2, 1945. During that time, Gill negotiated the surrender terms of Yamashita's forces. For his service in Pacific, Gill was decorated with Army Distinguished Service Medal, Bronze Star Medal and also received Philippine Legion of Honor, by the Government of Philippines.

Following the Surrender of Japan, Gill moved with his division to Sasebo, Kyushu for Occupation duty in mid-October 1945. He was relieved by Brigadier general Robert B. McBride Jr., Divisional Artillery Commander, shortly afterwards and returned to the United States. Gill retired on May 31, 1946, completing 34 years of commissioned service.

== Postwar career ==
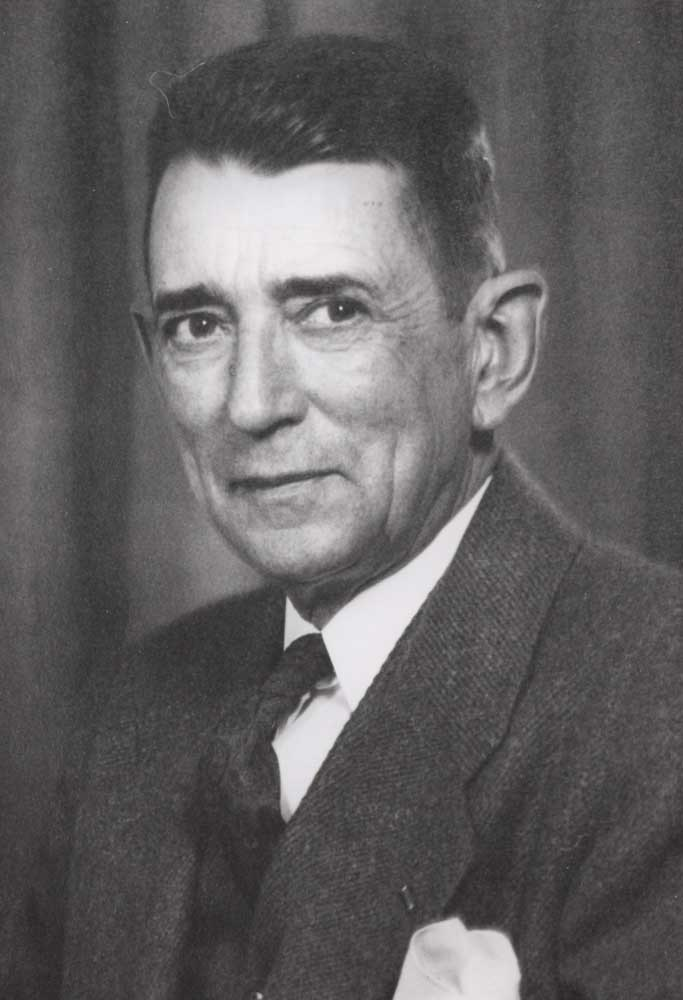
Gill as President of Colorado College.

Upon his retirement from the army, Gill settled in Colorado Springs, Colorado, and accepted job as a president of Colorado College in January 1949. During his tenure, Gill completed the reorganization of the college, an honor system was introduced together with self-government for the student body. He also established ROTC program and remodeled the athletic department, which led to the college winning the intercollegiate hockey championship during his administration.

Gill became active in several organizations, including the Colorado Springs Fine Arts Center where he served on its board of directors during 1948–1955; a member of the board of the Child Guidance Clinic in Colorado Springs and a Director of the Pikes Peak Chapter of the American Red Cross during 1948–1955. For his service at the Colorado College and organizations above, Gill was selected as Man of the Year in Colorado Springs in 1950, received honorary LL.D. degree from Denver University in 1950 and also from Colorado College in 1955.

He retired from Colorado College in 1955 as president emeritus and became a member of the budget committee of the Colorado Springs Community Chest in 1959. Beside his other activities, he was a member of the Association of the United States Army; the Colorado Springs Chamber of Commerce and co-authored a book "Always A Commander – The Reminiscences Of Major General William H. Gill" about his service in Pacific.

Gill died on January 17, 1976, aged 89, in Colorado Springs, Colorado. He was buried at Evergreen Cemetery in Colorado Springs beside his wife Elizabeth Grady. They had one daughter, Elizabeth.

== Decorations ==
Here is the list of Gill's decorations with ribbon bar:

1st Row	Distinguished Service Cross		Army Distinguished Service Medal
2nd Row	Silver Star with Oak Leaf Cluster	Legion of Merit	Bronze Star Medal
3rd Row	World War I Victory Medal with three battle clasps	Army of Occupation of Germany Medal	American Defense Service Medal
4th Row	American Campaign Medal	Asiatic–Pacific Campaign Medal with four 3/16-inch service stars	World War II Victory Medal
5th Row	Army of Occupation Medal	Philippine Legion of Honor, Commander	Philippine Liberation Medal with two stars
Presidential Unit Citation

== Publications ==
- Gill, William H. (1974). Always a Commander: The Reminiscences of Major General William H. Gill. Battery Press. ISBN 9780898390773.

Military offices
Preceded by Edwin F. Harding	Commanding General 32nd Infantry Division; 1943–1945	Succeeded by Robert B. McBride Jr.
Preceded by Newly activated organization	Commanding General 89th Infantry Division; 1942–1943	Succeeded by Thomas D. Finley
