= Dalton Pass =

Zigzag road and mountain pass in Luzon, the Philippines

Coordinates: 16°07′59″N 120°55′55″E

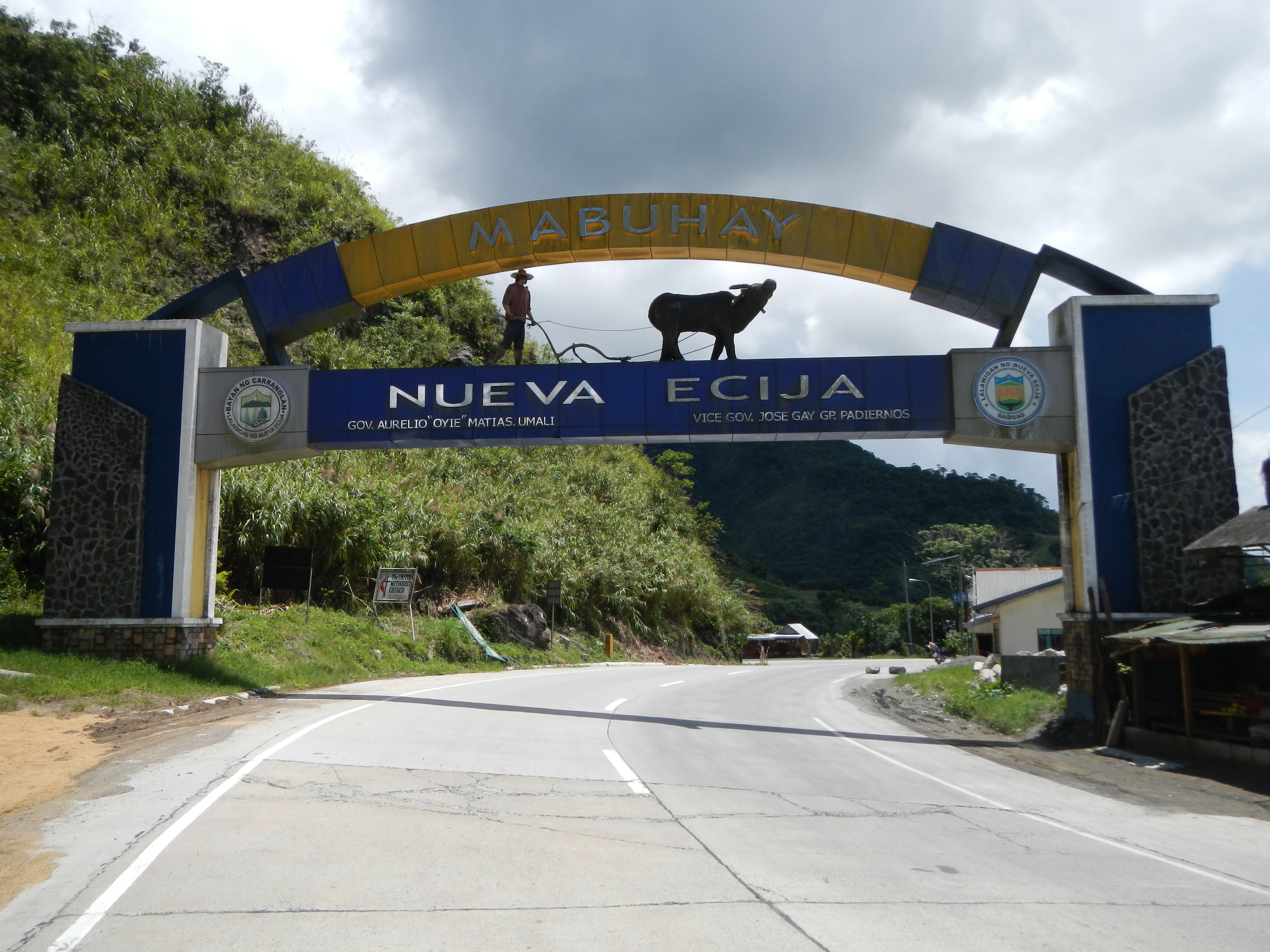
Dalton Pass gateway to the municipality of Carranglan, Nueva Ecija

Dalton Pass, also called Balete Pass, is a zigzag road and mountain pass that joins the provinces of Nueva Ecija and Nueva Vizcaya, in central Luzon island of the Philippines. It is part of Cagayan Valley Road segment of Pan-Philippine Highway (Maharlika Highway).

== Geography ==
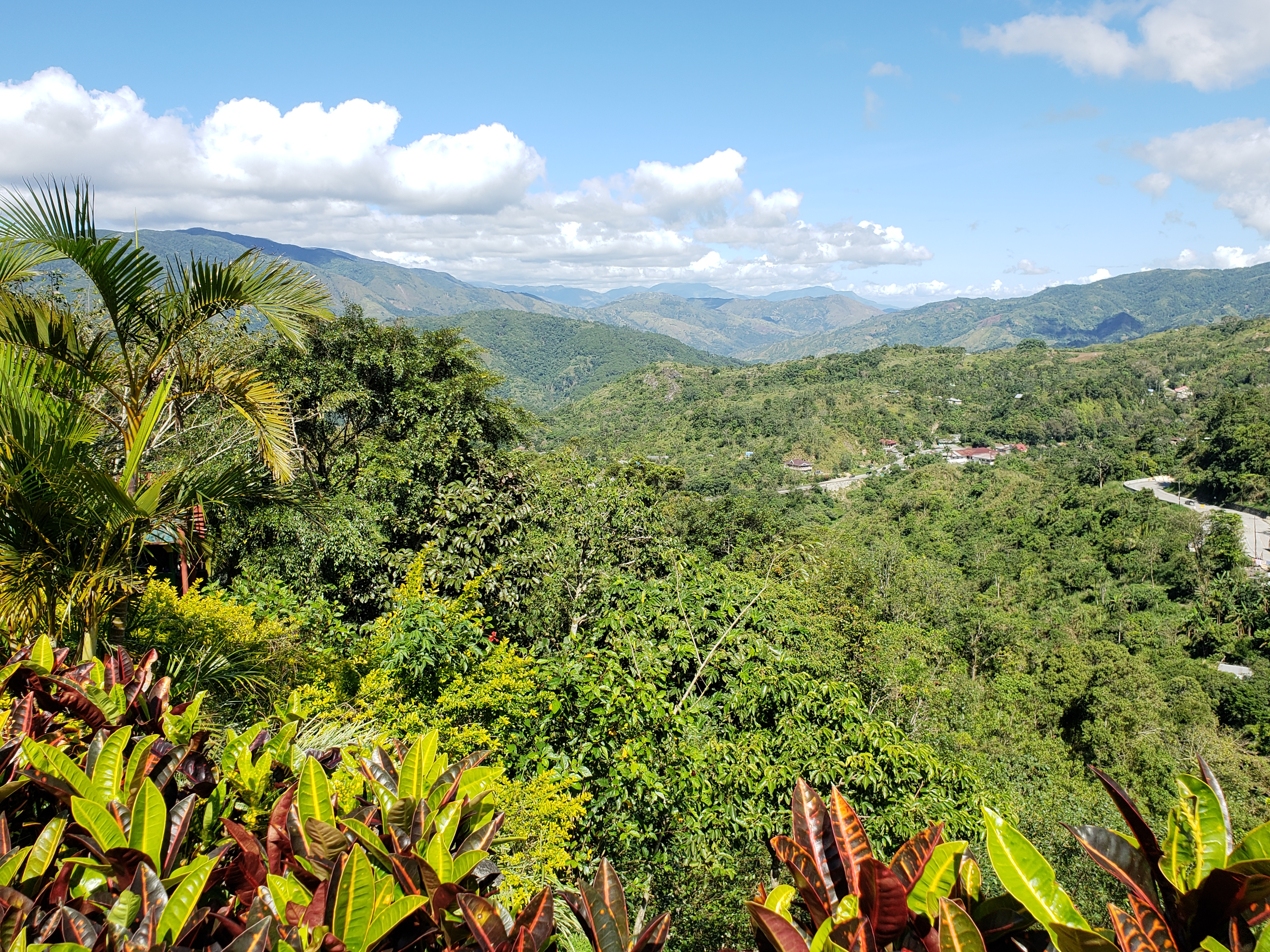
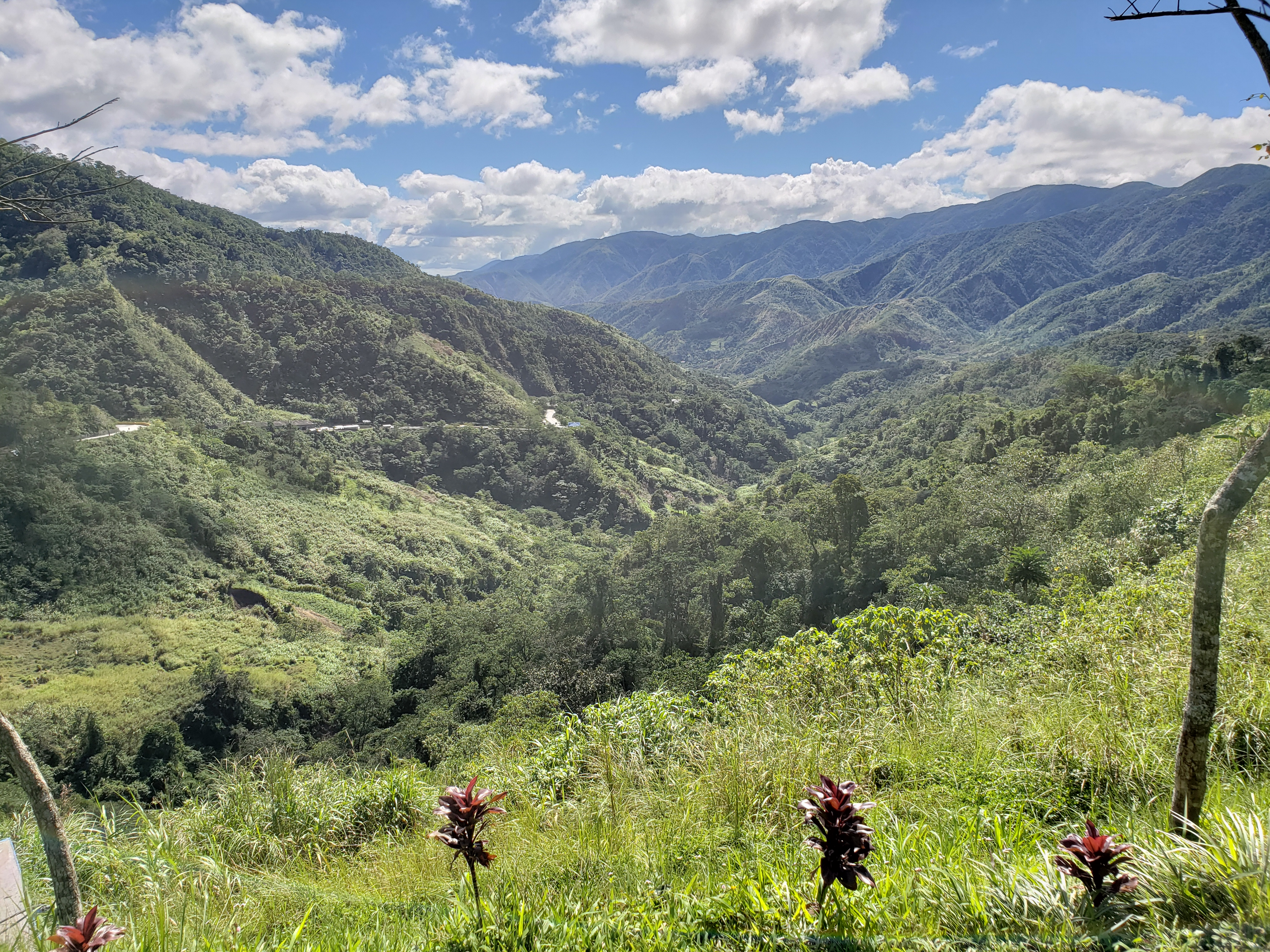
Dalton Pass view looking north (left) and south (right)

The summit of the mountain pass is at around 3,000 feet (910 m) in elevation, located where the Caraballo Sur (mountain range) and the Sierra Madre (mountain range) meet. The headwaters of the Digdig River originate just south of the pass. Balete Ridge starts two miles (3.2 km) to the west-northwest of the pass, with a high point at Mt. Imugan (5,580 feet (1,700 m)), and extends nine miles (14 km) to the east-southeast, where it ends at Mt. Kabuto (4,600 feet (1,400 m)).

Dalton Pass is a gateway to the Cagayan Valley, and the Ifugao Rice Terraces.

== History ==
=== Road creation ===
The idea for establishing a road along the pass originated with Father Juan Villaverde, a Spanish Dominican missionary priest who worked in Nueva Vizcaya and Ifugao during the late 19th century. In an 1889 letter, Villaverde proposed building a road through Mount Minuli in order to bypass the old route into Cagayan Valley, which was too steep and passed through the highest peaks of the Caraballo Mountains east of his proposed route. He based this on his observations that the five percent inclination of Mount Minuli's slope was suitable not only for carts but also for railways. However, his original plan bypassed what is now the highest point in the pass, which he deemed too steep. Construction of the road began during the American period and was completed in 1928.

=== Battle of Balete Pass ===
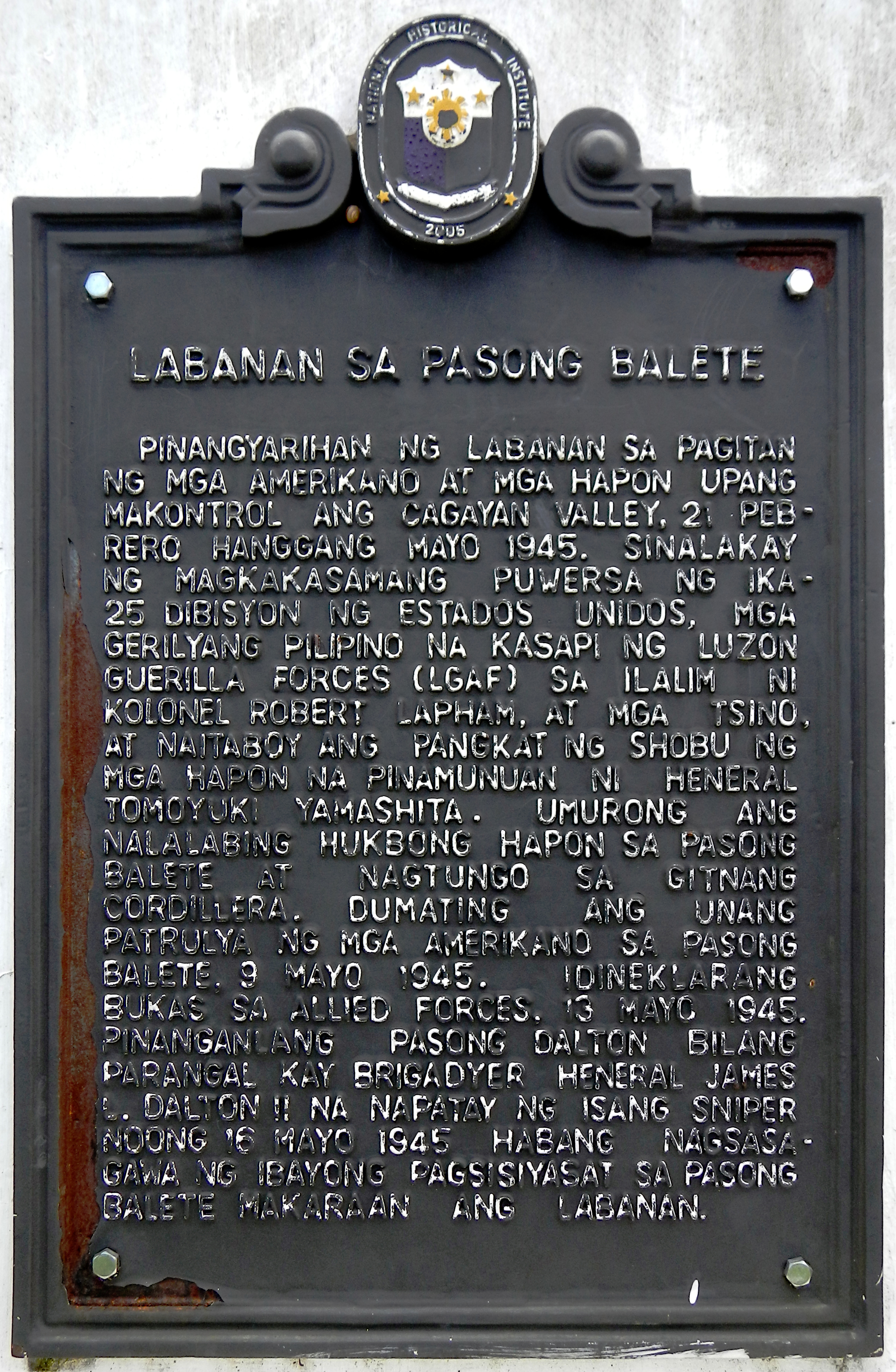
Philippine historical marker for the battle

The strategy of occupying Japanese troops during the Battle of Luzon was to fight a delaying retreat from Baguio to Bayombong, and then to a final defensive position in Kiangan, Ifugao. The pass was the only access between Central Luzon and the Cagayan Valley, and was the scene of much bloody fighting in the Battle of Luzon, during the final stages of World War II.

Balete Pass lies along Highway 5 from San Jose, Nueva Ecija and Santa Fe, Nueva Vizcaya and became a defensive position for General Tomoyuki Yamashita's forces. The similar, defensive Battle of Villa Verde Trail was fought at Salacsac Pass, the trail joining San Nicolas, Pangasinan and Santa Fe.

Japanese General Yoshiharu Iwanaka's 2nd Tank Division fought a retreating battle from San Jose to Dupax, before confronting the American 32nd Division, under the command of Maj. Gen. William H. Gill, at Salacsac Pass in early March 1945. That left the Japanese 10th Division, under the command of Lt. Gen. Yasuyuki Okamoto, to confront the American 25th Division, under the command of Maj. Gen. Charles L. Mullins, at Balete Pass.

According to Ogawa, "When Balete was about to be captured, those unable to move were left to die after much pain and agony. Some of the more fortunate were given potassium cyanide or hand grenades to dispose of themselves quickly." The Americans took the Balete area on 31 May 1945.

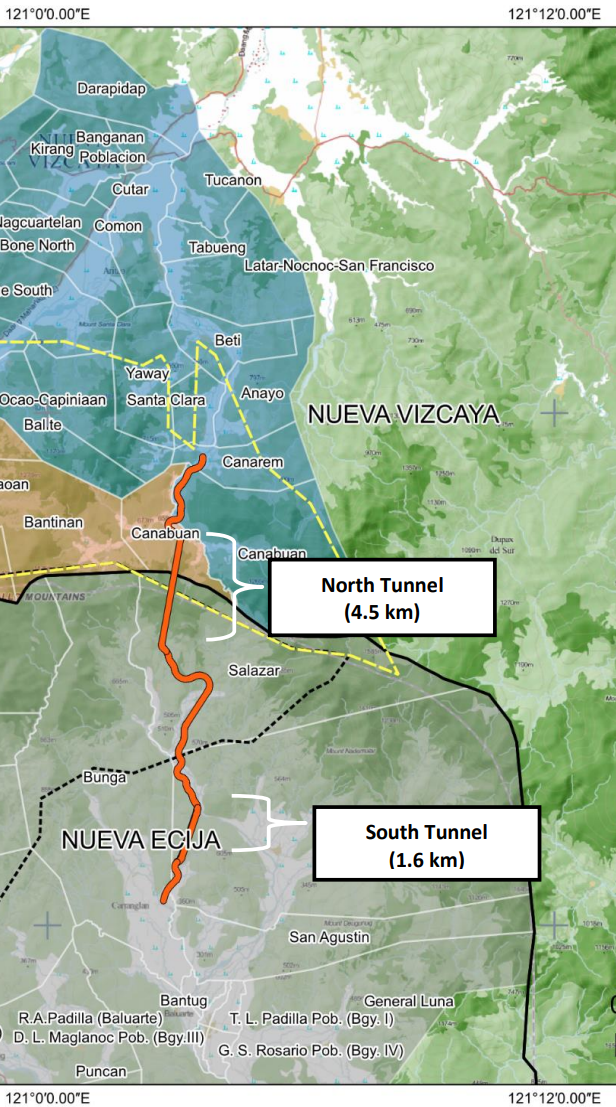
Map of the proposed Dalton Pass East Alignment Road

The Japanese lost 7,750 at Balete Pass, and 5,410 at Salacsac Pass. The Battle of Balete Pass incurred the death of 685, and the wounding of 2,090, American soldiers from the 25th Division between February 21 and May 31, 1945. The Battle of Villa Verde Trail, or the Battle of Salacsac Pass, cost the American 32nd Division, 825 killed, and 2,160 wounded. The casualties among Filipino Commonwealth regulars, Constabulary and guerrillas were 285 killed and 1,134 wounded in battle. The Japanese 10th Division and 2nd Tank Division were finished as effective combat units. Eight Chinese militiamen were also killed fighting for the Allied side.

The pass is named for Brigadier General James Dalton II, who was killed by a sniper during the battle.

In recognition of the event, Dalton Pass was declared a national shrine known as the Balete Pass National Shrine by President Benigno Aquino III in 2016.

=== 1990 earthquake ===
During the 1990 Luzon earthquake, the pass, which ran along the Digdig Fault that was the source of the rupture, was closed due to 25 major landslides. The earthquake displaced two million cubic meters of debris and loosed the area's soil, resulting in more landslides and road closures during heavy rains.

=== Dalton Pass East Alignment Road ===
Foreign Affairs Secretary Enrique Manalo announced on March 26, 2024 that the Department of Public Works and Highways obtained a JP¥100 (₱37 billion) loan from the Japan International Cooperation Agency (JICA) for the 23-kilometer four-lane Dalton Pass East Alignment Road. The alternative route will interconnect Nueva Ecija, Nueva Vizcaya, and the Cagayan Valley Region. The bypass road includes the construction of 6.1 kilometers of twin tunnels, 10 bridges of 5.8 kilometers, and flood control. Construction is expected to run from 2026 to 2031.

== Safety ==
The pass is known for its hairpin curves and steep gradient, which makes it difficult for motorists to traverse and contributes to road accidents. In 2017 alone, 541 accidents were recorded at the pass, with 21 resulting in fatalities. That same year, a bus fell off the road near Barangay Capintalan in Carranglan on April 18, killing 34 people.

== Balete Pass Tourism Complex ==
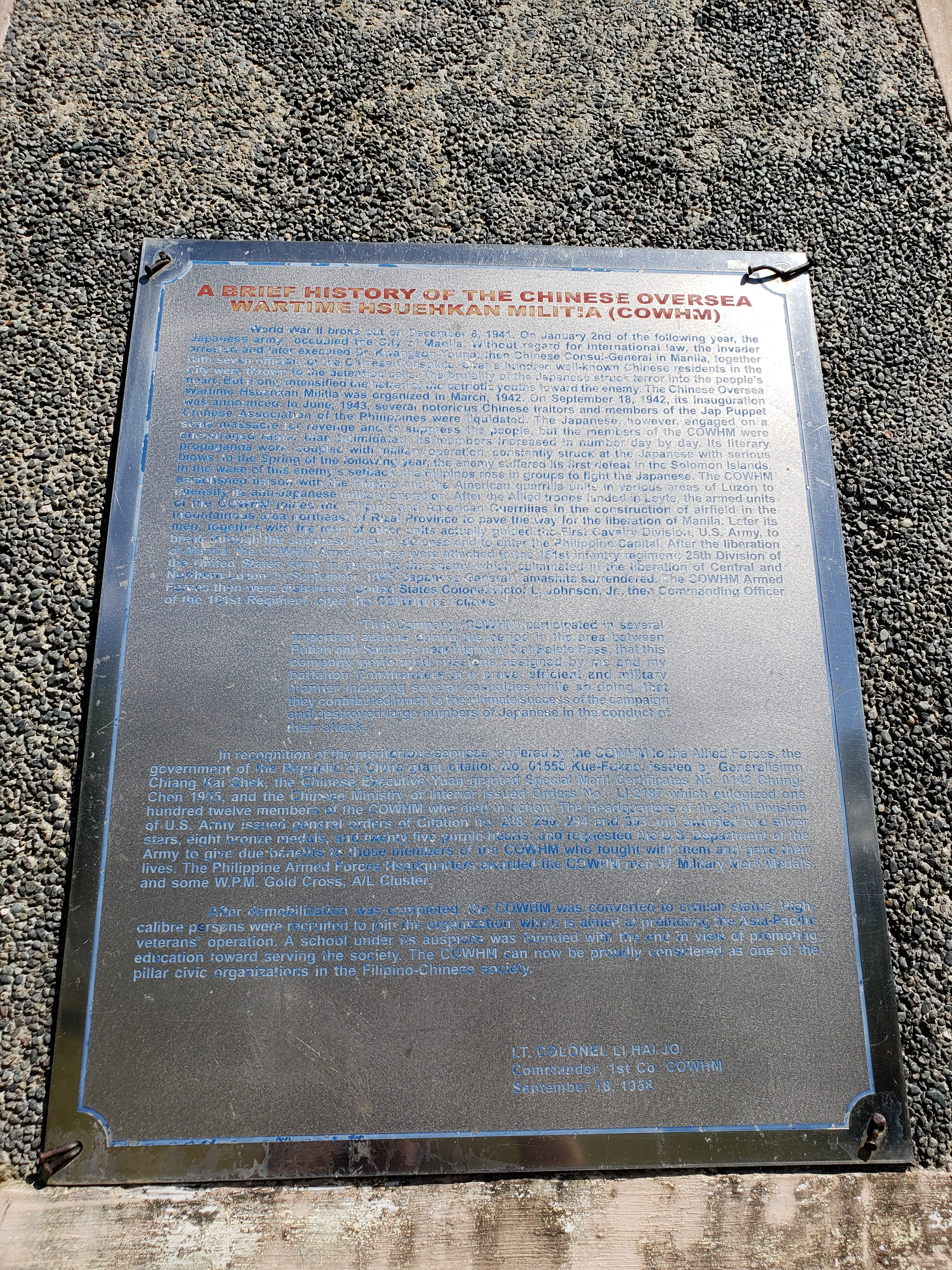
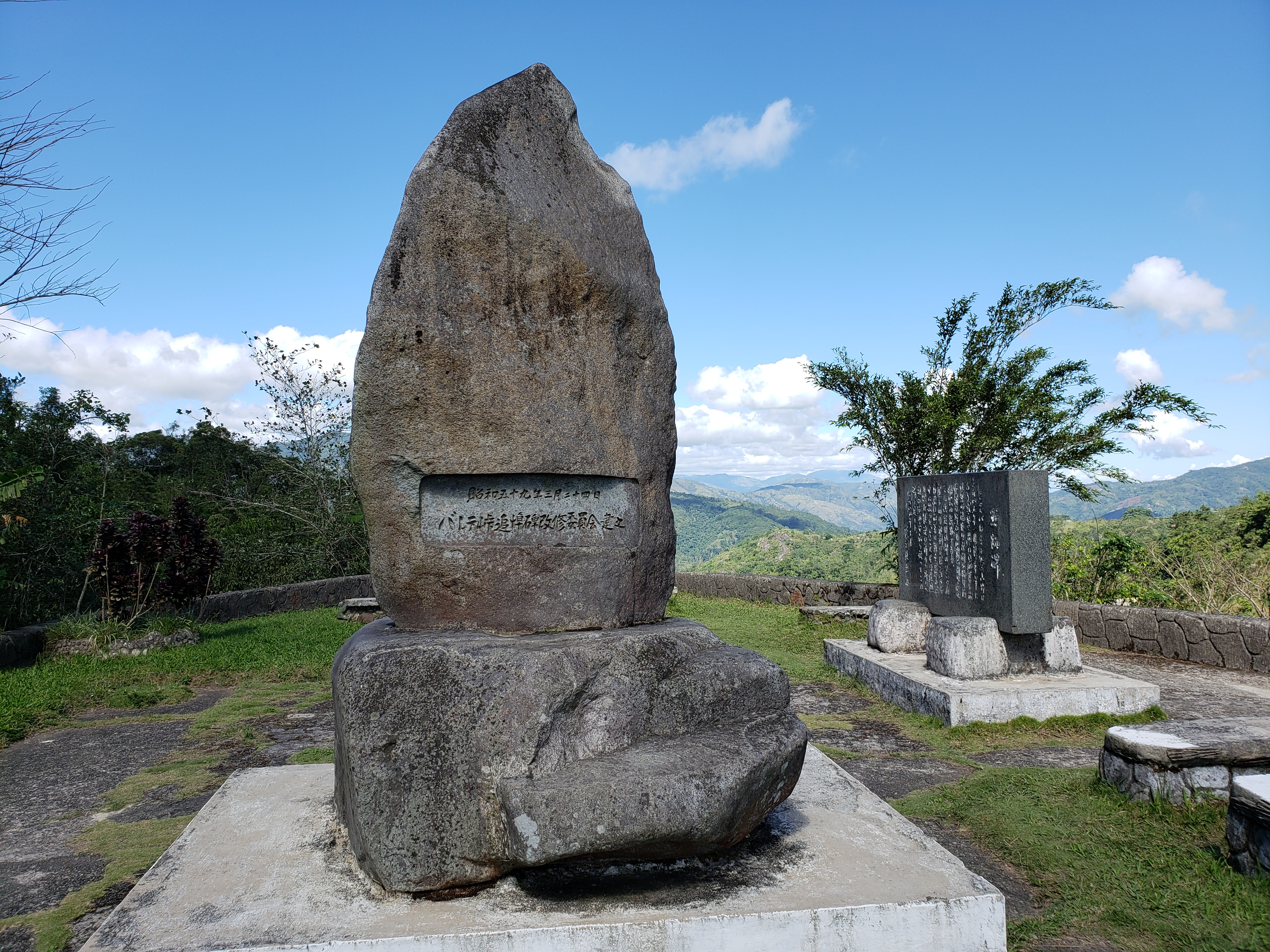
COWHN memorial (left) and Japanese memorials (right)

The Balete Pass Tourism Complex is in the summit area of the pass. The National Shrine of the Battle of Balete Pass and other monuments and memorials erected by the Chinese and the Japanese honor the war losses. The shrine is at the highest point at the "Dalton Pass Viewpoint with Shed" provincial project, which offers long vistas of the mountains and forests.

== Flora ==
The Dalton Pass area is home to the only critically endangered orchid of Nueva Ecija, Ceratocentron fesselii, which is endemic to the province. It has orange flowers with purple lips and that glows lightly at dark. It is threatened by illegal logging, and illegal collecting for the orchid trade in the international black market.

The national government has yet to dedicate the natural Dalton Pass habitat as a nature reserve to protect the endemic orchid, leaving extinction of the orchid in the wild a threat.

== See also ==
- List of American guerrillas in the Philippines
- Battle of Bessang Pass
