= Battle of Villa Verde Trail =

1945 WWII battle in the Philippines

Coordinates: 16.174°N 120.870°E

Battle for the Villa Verde Trail
- Part of the South West Pacific theatre of World War II
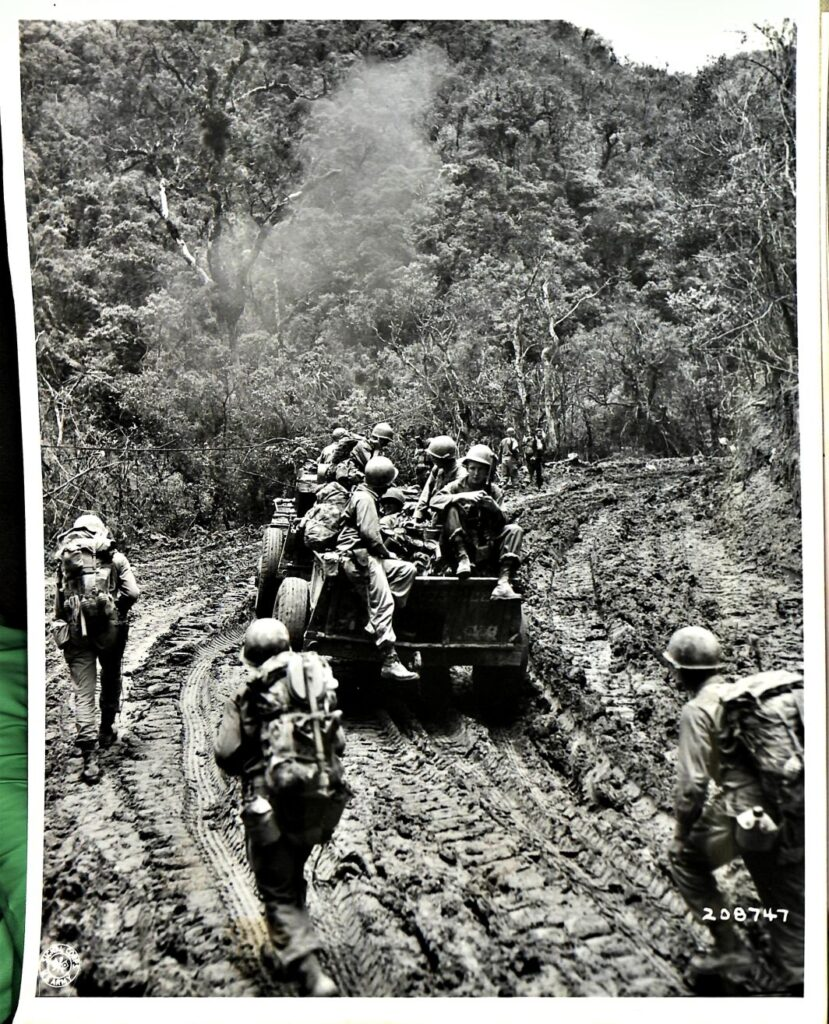
- American soldiers trudge up the Villa Verde Trail.
Date	21 February – 31 May 1945
Location	Philippines
Result	Allied victory

Belligerents
United States: Commonwealth of the Philippines	Japan

Commanders and leaders
(United States) William H. Gill	(Empire of Japan) Haruo Konuma

Units involved
32nd Infantry Division; Filipino Guerilla Forces	10th Division; 2nd Tank Division

Strength
11,000 U.S. soldiers; 500 Filipino guerrillas	8,750

Casualties and losses
(United States) :825 killed 2,160 wounded 6,000 sick (Commonwealth of the Philippines) : Unknown	5,750 killed
- The location of the Villa Verde Trail

The Battle of Villa Verde Trail (Filipino: Labanan sa Tugaygayan ng Villa Verde) was a campaign by the United States Army and Filipino guerrillas in the Philippines during World War II in 1945 to force its way across the Caraballo Mountains from the Central Luzon plain to the Cagayan Valley. Somewhat to the surprise of the Americans, the Japanese had constructed strong defenses along the narrow and winding Villa Verde Trail, 27 miles (43 km) in length. The campaign began on 21 February 1945 and concluded with the success of the Americans on 31 May 1945. The U.S.'s 32nd Infantry Division, called the Red Arrow Division, carried out the campaign with assistance from Filipino guerrillas.

The 32nd Division suffered heavy casualties during the campaign. U.S. casualties were 825 dead and 2,160 wounded. About 6,000 soldiers were treated for illness, disease, or combat fatigue. Japanese losses were estimated of at least 5,750 dead out of 8,750 defenders. The U.S. commander, Major General William H. Gill, would later say that cost of the battle was too high for what was achieved.

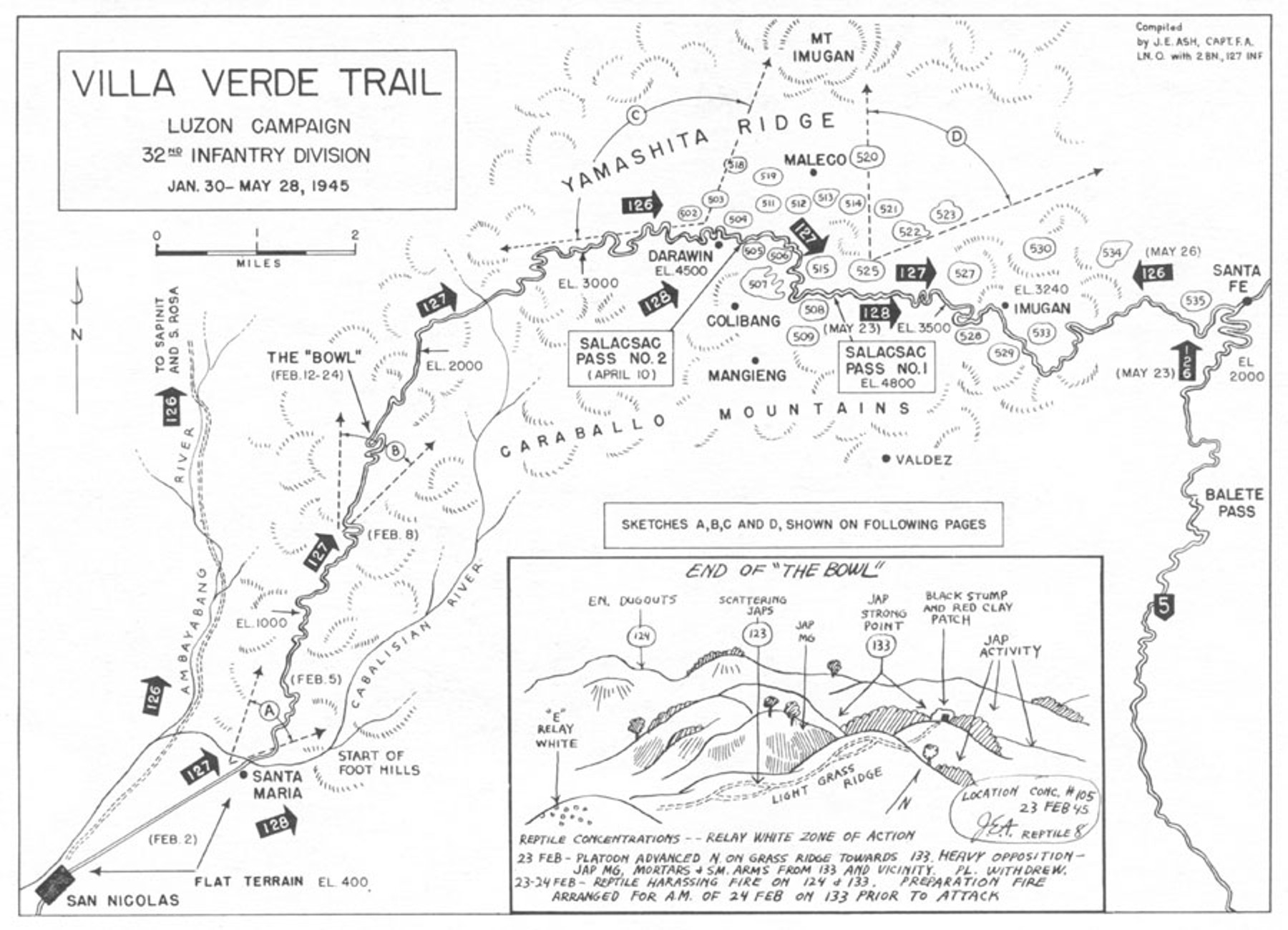
A map of the Battle for the Villa Verde Trail

== Prelude ==
With the Battle of Manila winding down, American units in the northern part of Luzon were freed to go on the offensive against the Japanese forces who occupied strong defensive positions in the Caraballo mountains blocking American access to the fertile Cagayan Valley. The plan was for the 25th Infantry Division to fight its way northward along Route 5 (now AH 26) toward the crossroads town of Santa Fe, Nueva Vizcaya. A second division, the 32nd would attack up the Villa Verde Trail, a difficult, primitive, winding track through the mountains, to Santa Fe. The Villa Verde Trail at its best was a dirt road 10-12 feet wide, but mostly only a footpath that climbed in elevation from 400 ft (120 m) at its western terminus at the hamlet of Santa Maria to 4,400 ft (1,300 m) near the Salacsac Pass and then dropped down in elevation to 2,000 ft (610 m) at Santa Fe.

The soldiers of the 32nd were assisted by a battalion of Filipinos, the Buena Vista guerrillas, which operated in the rear of the Japanese defenses. Captain Ray C. Hunt was the liaison between the Americans and Filipinos. The U.S. planners anticipated that the advance on the Villa Verde trail would be accomplished rapidly and that on arriving at Santa Fe the 32nd division would be in the rear of Japanese defenders at Balete Pass (now Dalton Pass) on Route 5. The planners were wrong and the Battle of Villa Verde Trail would be long and difficult.

== The Battle ==
The 127th Infantry Regiment (already understrength with 2,650 men instead of the 3,000 called for by regulation), one of three infantry regiments in the 32nd Division, proceeded without major opposition for the first few miles of the Villa Verde Trail but ran into the Japanese defense line on March 5 at the Second Salacsac Pass. The Japanese here were dug into a mutually-interlocking defense in caves and tunnels and with machine guns and artillery covering every foot of the trail. The higher ground overlooking the Trail and occupied by the Japanese acquired the name of "Yamashita Ridge" after the Japanese commander in the Philippines.

The battle for the Villa Verde Trail became a knock-down, drag-out slug fest...the 32d Division's difficult operations in the Salacsac Pass area could hardly avoid taking on a monotonous pattern. First, there would be unsuccessful frontal attacks against hillside strongholds. Failing, the troops would wait for air and artillery support to soften up the opposition and try again. Then there would be company and battalion outflanking maneuvers, some successful, some ending in near disaster, and all, as the result of Japanese defensive dispositions, inevitably winding up as frontal assaults. Every type of action would be repeated day after dreary day, either in heat enervating to the extreme on clear days, or in cloudbursts, fog, and mud.

Efforts to assault and bypass Japanese defenses were futile, and on 23 March a badly depleted 127th regiment was relieved temporarily by the 128th Infantry Regiment. The third infantry regiment, the 126th, was brought into action to assault the Japanese positions from the north. The Americans made slow progress, but by 17 April the Japanese had mostly evacuated their defenses at the Second Salacsac Pass and retreated to the First Salacsac Pass, little more than 1 mile (1.6 km) to the east.

Two American regiments, the 126th and 127th assaulted the First Salacsac Pass. The Japanese defense was even stiffer there. The Japanese attempted several unsuccessful banzai attacks. Several efforts to flank or encircle the Japanese forces were mostly unsuccessful, although inflicting heavy casualties on the Japanese. Not until 24 May did the Americans finally capture the pass. The surviving Japanese withdrew from the area. On 28 May the village of Imugan fell to the Americans and on 29 May the 32nd Division was united with the 25th Infantry Division after the Buena Vista guerrillas captured the last Japanese strong point and made contact with elements of the 25th on Route 5 near Santa Fe. The route northward into the Cagayan Valley was open. It had taken more than three months for the army to eliminate the Japanese along the Villa Verde Trail.

The capture of the Villa Verde Trail was facilitated by the work of the 114th Engineer Battalion which widened the trail under fire to make it possible for vehicular travel. The trail acquired the nickname of the "Little Burma Road". Supply of the advancing troops was a problem with a road only partially traversable by vehicle. 150 Filipino porters trudged up and down the trail carrying ammunition and food to the soldiers. Communications in the mountains were sporadic and heavy rains, mud, and landslides inhibited travel. Battle casualties of the 32nd Division were 825 dead and 2,160 wounded, and 6,000 sick, a casualty rate of 81.68 percent. The Japanese lost at least 5,750 of the 8,750 men engaged.

== Consequences ==
The 32nd Infantry Division logged a total of 654 days of combat during World War II, more than any other United States Army division. About 30 percent of the men in the division had been overseas for nearly three years and had participated in several combat operations. The strain on the soldiers showed up in this battle. The division was 4,000 soldiers under strength and problems with morale and mental and physical exhaustion were noted as early as April. No fresh division was available to relieve the 32nd, so the division slogged on. 6,000 soldiers were evacuated at least temporarily from the battle for illness, disease, and especially "combat fatigue and associated psychoneurotic upsets." Guerrilla leader Hunt commented that "the three F's of combat are 'fog, fatigue, and fear' and the latter two deepen visibly near the end of long campaigns or long wars."

In the words of one author, "the price for that goat path in the clouds had been too high." General Gill would later say that "the 32nd had gained too little for what it had lost."
