= Clarence A. Martin =

United States Army general (1896–1986)

Clarence Ames Martin
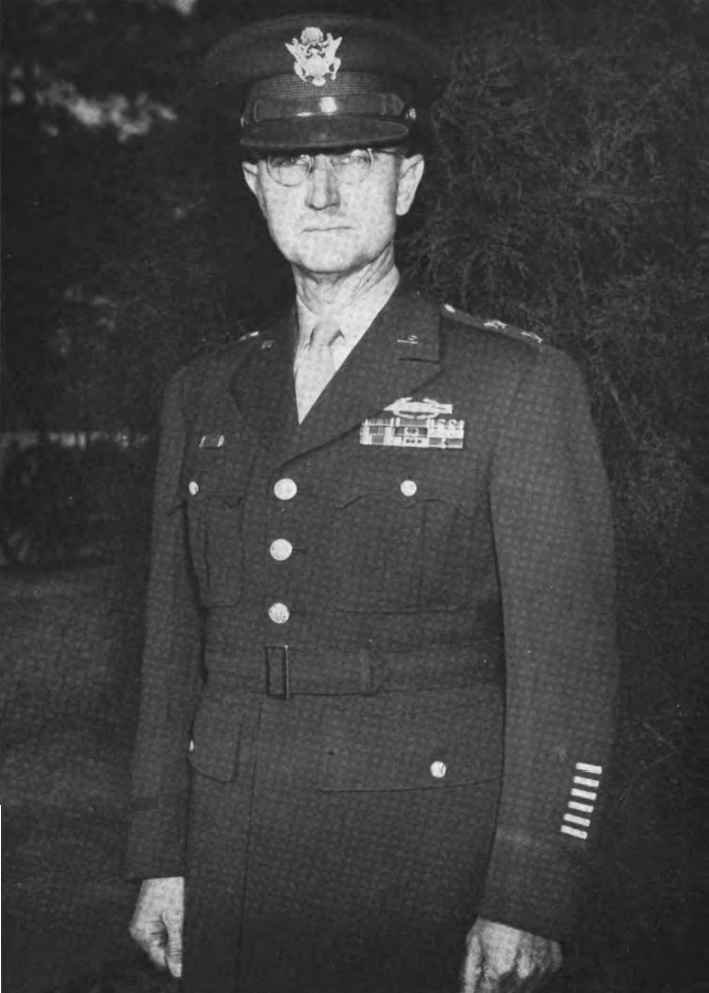
- MG Clarence A. Martin, U.S.A.
- Born: September 13, 1896; Belle Haven, Virginia
- Died: December 11, 1986 (aged 90); Greenville, South Carolina
- Burial place: Woodlawn Memorial Park, South Carolina
- Military career
- Branch: United States Army
- Service years: 1917–1947
- Rank: Major General
- Service number: 0–7007
- Unit: Infantry Branch
- Commands: Fort Jackson; 31st Infantry Division; 128th Infantry Regiment
- Conflicts: World War I; Meuse–Argonne offensive; World War II; New Guinea campaign; Battle of Buna–Gona; Operation Cartwheel; Landing at Saidor; Western New Guinea campaign; Battle of Driniumor River; Battle of Morotai; Philippines campaign; Battle of Mindanao
- Awards: Distinguished Service Cross; Army Distinguished Service Medal; Silver Star (3); Legion of Merit; Air Medal

Clarence Ames Martin (September 13, 1896 – December 11, 1986) was a highly decorated officer in the United States Army with the rank of major general. A veteran of World War I, he distinguished himself as a company commander in France and held various staff and field assignments during the interwar period.

Following a tour of staff assignments at the beginning of World War II, Martin assumed command of the 128th Infantry Regiment in late 1942. He distinguished himself during the Battle of Buna–Gona and received the Distinguished Service Cross, the second highest military decoration of the United States for bravery in combat. Martin subsequently rose to general officer's rank and after service as the assistant division commander of the 32nd Infantry Division before he assumed command of the 31st Infantry Division, which he led during the liberation of the Philippines in 1945.

== Early career ==
Clarence Ames Martin was born on September 13, 1896, in Belle Haven, Virginia as the son of farmer James P. Martin and Elizabeth S. Turlington. Following the high school, he entered the Virginia Military Institute (VMI) in Lexington, Virginia and during his studies, he was active in baseball, football and track. Martin graduated as 11th in a class of 59 with Bachelor of Science degree in Civil engineering in May 1917, shortly after the United States' entry into World War I and was appointed a captain in the National Army.

He assumed command of Company "K", 320th Infantry Regiment at Camp Lee in Petersburg, Virginia and upon activation of the 80th Division, Martin resigned his emergency captain's commission to accept a Regular Army commission as a second lieutenant of Infantry on October 25, 1917. He was promoted directly to first lieutenant on that date and subsequently assigned to the newly organized Company "D", 56th Infantry Regiment, 7th Division at Fort Oglethorpe, Georgia where he took part in intensive training for deployment overseas.

Martin was transferred to the Company "C" of his regiment and attended the Automatic School of Arms at Fort Sill, Oklahoma in February 1918. He then assumed command of Company "G" of his regiment at Camp MacArthur in Waco, Texas which he led to Camp Merritt, New Jersey one month later to embark for France. After their arrival to France in mid-August 1918, Martin conducted final training and preparation to enter the line in the Ancy-le-Franc Training Area. He then attended the III Corps' Field School at Châtillon-sur-Seine before rejoined his company for fighting in the Meuse-Argonne-Lorraine area. He distinguished himself in combat and received the Silver Star citation for bravery in combat. Martin was promoted to the temporary rank of captain on November 7, 1918, only four days before the Armistice with Germany was signed.

== Between the wars ==
The 56th Regiment remained in France and only returned to the United States in early 1919 and was stationed at Camp Funston, Kansas until May 1920, when Martin was transferred to Minneapolis, Minnesota for temporary duty with the local Army recruiting station. His rank of captain had been made permanent in July that year and he rejoined his company in January 1921, before assuming command of company "E" of the 56th Regiment at Camp Meade, Maryland in May 1921.

Martin was ordered to the U.S. Army Infantry School at Fort Benning, Georgia in September that year and after the completion of the company officers' course the following June, he was appointed professor of military science and tactics at the Tennessee Military Institute at Sweetwater, Tennessee. He served in this capacity for five years before he was transferred for service in the Philippines in August 1927. Martin assumed duty as commanding officer (CO) of Company "E", 45th Infantry Regiment (Philippine Scouts) at Fort William McKinley in Manila.

After two years of service in the Philippines, Martin returned to the United States in April 1929 and after a two-month leave with his family, he assumed duty as CO of Company "F", 34th Infantry Regiment at Fort Eustis, Virginia. He assumed command of Headquarters and Headquarters company of his regiment in October 1931 and remained in that assignment for seven months.

In June 1932, Martin returned to his alma mater, VMI, for duty as assistant professor of military science and tactics. While in this capacity, he was promoted to major in August 1935 and ordered to attend the Army Command and General Staff School at Fort Leavenworth, Kansas in September 1936.

Upon graduation in June 1937, Martin assumed command of the 2nd Battalion, 10th Infantry Regiment at Fort Thomas, Kentucky and served in this capacity until August 1938, when he was transferred to the regimental staff for duty as intelligence and operations officer.

In August 1939, Martin was ordered to Washington, D.C. and graduated from the Army War College there in March 1940. He was subsequently ordered to Knoxville, Tennessee for duty as an instructor of infantry for the Tennessee National Guard. He was promoted to lieutenant colonel in August that year and joined the headquarters of the 30th Infantry Division at Fort Jackson, South Carolina upon the division's reactivation for federal service in mid-September 1940. There he served as an assistant chief of staff for training (G-3) under Major General Henry D. Russell, the 30th's commander, until November 1941.

== World War II ==
=== Buna-Guna ===
Following the United States' entry into World War II in December 1941, Martin was promoted to the temporary rank of colonel and joined the headquarters of I Corps as assistant chief of staff for operations (G-3). He served consecutively under major generals Charles F. Thompson and Robert L. Eichelberger and accompanied his command overseas, arriving to Brisbane, Australia in mid-September 1942. At this stage, the corps consisted of two inexpirenced National Guard infantry divisions – the 32nd and 41st – and the Supreme Allied Commander of the South West Pacific Area, General Douglas MacArthur, ordered Eichelberger to deploy the 32nd Division to New Guinea to help the Australians to stop the Japanese from capturing of Port Moresby.

Although the 32nd Division had not yet completed its training, MacArthur nevertheless ordered its deployment to New Guinea by the end of September. The division soon began struggling in combat with the Japanese and after a month of fighting at Buna–Gona, Eichelberger, together with his staff, flew to Buna-Gona in order to have a better situational overview. After a conference with the 32nd Division's commanding general (CG), Edwin F. Harding, Eichelberger dispatched Martin and the corps' intelligence officer, Gordon B. Rogers, to assess the situation.

Martin and Rogers were ordered to inspect Warren Force, a task force made up of Australian and American forces, and they had to travel on foot due to weather conditions and the dense jungle. Once they had arrived on the frontline, they found units of the force in defensive positions with little actual fighting ongoing. The two men returned to the divisional headquarters at Dobodura late at night and were highly critical of Warren Force's performance. Eichelberger subsequently decorated Martin with the Silver Star for bravery in action for conducting a hazardous mission with the intention of gathering important information.

Eichelberger relieved Harding, the 32nd's CG, along with all three of the division's infantry regimental commanders for a perceived lack of aggresivness, as well as a lack of progress, on December 3, and Martin was chosen as commanding officer (CO) of the division's 128th Infantry Regiment, relieving Colonel J. Tracy Hale. He was also given the additional duty as CO of Warren Force. He immediately began with the reorganization of his new unit.

Following an airstrike of six A-20's, and a brief artillery preparation, Martin led his task force in an attack against Japanese positions on December 5, but well organized enemy units repelled Warren Force. Martin and his unit then remained at the positions until Christmas Day 1942 and then resumed their attack in the early morning. However, Warren Force's advance was soon halted by strong Japanese resistance and Martin sent a detachment from his regiment to reconnoitre a nearby swamp, the intention being to find a way around the enemy's right flank. Upon receiving a report that the swamp was impenetrable, Martin decided to personally explore the area to find a way through. He managed to do so and the detachment was able to penetrate into the enemy's rear, but Martin wasn't able to get reinforcements over there until after dark.

After the reinforcements has arrived, Martin decided to climb a tall tree that overlooked the Japanese positions to get a better view on the enemy troops lurking in the tall grass immediately to his front. From this vantage point he killed several of them with a rifle. Warren Force then participated in some bitter fighting against fanatical Japanese resistance, which lasted until the end of January 1943, when Buna was declared secure. For his impressive service on Buna-Guna, Martin received the Distinguished Service Cross (DSC), the second highest military decoration in the United States Armed Forces for bravery in combat. He also received the Combat Infantryman Badge, an honor he was most proud of.

=== Saidor ===
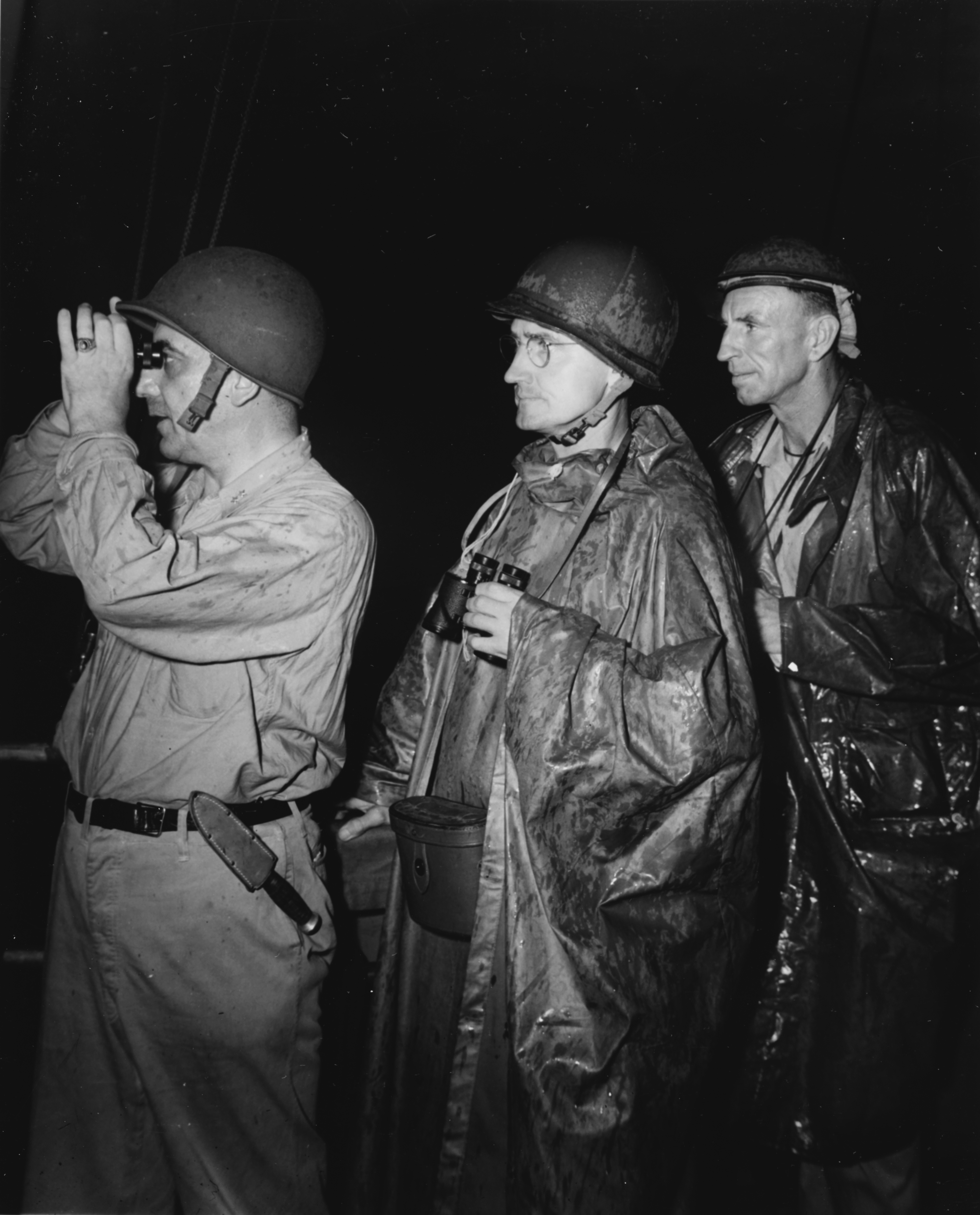
Martin (center) observes the landing at Saidor with Rear Admiral Daniel E. Barbey, and Brigadier Ronald Hopkins.

Due to his leadership abilities, as well as his own personal bravery, Martin was promoted to the temporary rank of brigadier general on February 3, 1943, and joined the headquarters of the 32nd Infantry Division as the assistant division commander (ADC) to Major General William H. Gill, who had replaced Harding. He accompanied the division back to Brisbane, where he supervised the re-equipment and retraining of the division for the next campaigns in South Pacific which, as it turned out, took more than six months.

The 32nd Division moved back to New Guinea in mid-October 1943 and continued their amphibious training at Milne Bay and Goodenough Island until January 1944, when it received orders to deploy in the mainland of New Guinea. Its goal was to take part in the landing at Saidor, a village on the north coast of Papua New Guinea. The division was selected by General MacArthur and Lieutenant General Walter Krueger, commanding general of the Sixth Army and its primary objective was the capture of the airstrip at Saidor which will allow construction of an airbase to assist Allied air forces to conduct operations against Japanese bases at Wewak and Hollandia. A secondary objective was to cut off the 6,000 Imperial Japanese troops retreating from Sio in the face of the Australian advance from Finschhafen. Martin took part in the planning of the assault and was selected by Gill to lead a Michaelmas task force, which was built around the 126th Infantry Regimental Combat Team with Colonel Joseph S. Bradley in command.

The main landing on dawn of January 2, 1944, found little opposition from Japanese and Martin and his task force encountered only occasional aggressive Japanese patrols in upcoming days. The mission of capturing the airfield area had been quickly accomplished and by the afternoon of January 4, 1,800 ft (550 m) of runway was ready for use. More engineer units arrived and continued to improve the airstrip, permitting twelve C-47 Skytrains loaded with ammunition to land on January 11.

On January 12, Martin received intelligence reports from Krueger's Sixth Army headquarters that the Japanese were concentrating around Sio, and would attempt to force their way through to Madang. In response to a request from Martin for reinforcements, the 128th Infantry's 1st and 3rd battalion were organized into combat teams and were sent to reinforce Saidor, arriving on January 16. Martin came to believe that an advance to the east and an attack on the withdrawing enemy would "provide an opportunity to destroy the Japanese before they could organise an attack on the Saidor position".

Krueger did not immediately give Martin permission for such an operation. There was still the possibility of Japanese attack, and the 32nd Infantry Division was required for the upcoming Hansa Bay operation. On January 20, a visiting staff officer from the Sixth Army was asked to raise the possibility with Krueger. However, on January 21, Martin received a letter stating that the mission of his task force remained unchanged and a radiogram was received on January 22 to the effect that this was not consistent with Krueger's wishes. On February 8, Martin received a garbled radiogram from Krueger that indicated that the earlier restrictive message of January 22 had itself been garbled, and on February 9, a radiogram was received authorising offensive action. Plans were immediately made but on February 10 contact was made with elements of the Australian 5th Division, which had relieved the 9th Division on January 20. This closed the gap on the east flank.

Although the intensity of clashes with the Japanese increased, over 8,000 enemy soldiers were able to bypassed Martin and his task force due to late orders from Krueger. The Japanese lost approximately 1,000 men while U.S. forces had 67 casualties including killed in action, wounded and missing. The Sixth Army commander considered the campaign to be successful, despite the secondary goal, of cutting off the Japanese forces from their lines, going fulfilled. For his service in New Guinea, Martin was decorated with the Legion of Merit and also received the Distinguished Service Order (DSO) from the Australians.

=== Aitape ===
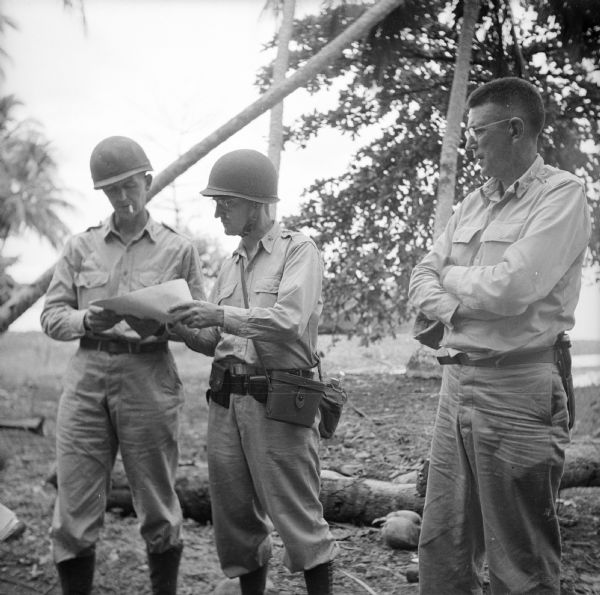
Martin (center) with his division commander, MG William H. Gill (right) and Division Artillery commander BG Robert B. McBride during the field briefing at New Guinea in summer of 1944.

In April 1944, the 32nd Division was selected again by MacArthur and Krueger to took part in the Landing at Aitape to isolate the Japanese 18th Army at Wewak. After two weeks of fighting, Aitape was secured with 550 casualties on the Japanese side in contrast to 60 Allied casualties. However the retreating 20,000 men of Japanese 18th Army were about to attack Aitape and General Gill prepared, together with Martin, a defensive plan and ordered his division to dig in. Gill then placed Martin in charge of Covering force, which was sent for a reconnaissance mission and was tasked with the delaying of the enemy on Driniumor River, before U.S. forces can prepare all of its forces for counterattack.

Due to difficult terrain and weather conditions, the supplying of Martin's was slow and he had a force of roughly 1,500 men to cover a frontage originally designed for two to three times that number. When Japanese launched their attack during the night of July 10, 1944, Martin led the withdrawal of his task force following some planned delaying actions and Japanese forces were able to break through the first line of defence. General Krueger refused to believe that Martin's retreat from the Driniumor River had been necessary and did not agree with Martin's estimate of the seriousness of the situation.

On July 12, Martin was replaced in command of Covering force by General Gill and was assigned to command of Eastern Sector of Driniumor River. He also retained his duty as Assistant Division Commander, 32nd Infantry Division under Gill. Although Martin became the scapegoat for failing to prevent the Japanese breakthrough he remained with his division until the end of campaign which resulted in almost 10,000 dead Japanese with 440 Killed in Action on the Allied side by the end of August 1944.

=== Morotai ===
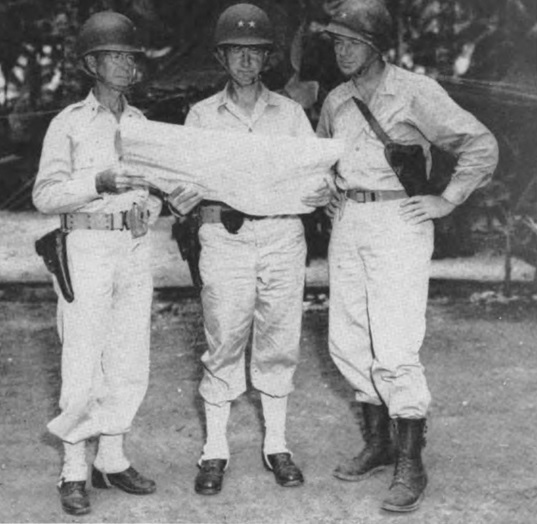
Martin (center) over the map with 31st Division's Assistant commander BG Joseph C. Hutchinson (left) and division's artillery commander BG Thomas F. Hickey (right) in Pacific in late 1944.

In mid-September 1944, Martin was tasked by Gill to lead a Regimental combat team during the landing on Morotai, an island in the Dutch East Indies intended to be used as a base to support the planned liberation of the Philippines later that year. The invading forces greatly outnumbered the island's Japanese defenders and secured their objectives in two weeks. Martin's abilities as potential Division commander were recognized and he was appointed Commanding General, 31st Infantry Division ("Dixie") on September 23 with the temporary promotion to Major general.

The 31st Division was composed chiefly of Southerners from Alabama, Florida, Louisiana, and Mississippi and saw only limited action against Japanese arriving to the South-West Pacific Area in late April 1944. It was stationed on Morotai following the main landing and seized Mapia, on November 15–17, and waded ashore on the Asia Islands, November 19–20, only to find the Japanese had already evacuated. Martin supervised the division's training for the upcoming liberation of the Philippines and successfully conducted base operations both in Sansapor and Morotai.

=== Mindanao ===
Martin and his division landed on Mindanao on April 22, 1945, and together with the Philippine Commonwealth Army and Philippine Constabulary they fought the Japanese forces along the Sayre Highway and driving down the Kibawe-Talomo trail. After the Japanese withdrawal into the interior, the 31st Division blocked off other Japanese in the Davao area and destroyed the enemy in the Bukidnon Province and Agusan Valley.

Following the arrival of Japanese reinforcements from the disintegrated 35th Army, Martin led combats along the Agusan River and in the jungles around Waloe until the cessation of hostilities on August 15, 1945. His division was subsequently tasked with accomplishing the surrender of all Japanese forces on Mindanao. Martin's division secured the Agusan Valley, Bukidnon Province, Davao and Sarangani Bay areas, securing 22,310 prisoners-of-war. The 31st Division was then responsible for the evacuation of the Japanese personnel back to Japan until the end of October, when they were ordered to embark for the United States. For his service on Mindanao, Martin was decorated with the Army Distinguished Service Medal. He also received the Air Medal for participation in the aerial reconnaissance over Mindanao.

== Retirement ==
Upon his arrival to San Francisco, California on December 19, 1945, the 31st Division was assembled at Camp Stoneman near Pittsburg, California and was inactivated under Martin's supervision two days later. Martin was subsequently transferred to Fort Jackson, South Carolina, where he replaced Brigadier general Duncan G. Richart as Commanding general. He was responsible for the demobilization of troops returning from overseas until the end of May that year, when he was ordered home to Columbia, South Carolina, pending retirement.

Martin retired on July 31, 1947, after 30 years of commissioned service and settled in Greenville, South Carolina together with his wife Susan Thomiza Johnson. They had two children, a daughter Elizabeth and a son, Clarence Jr., who was killed in action in November 1950 while serving as Major on the headquarters of X Corps in Korea. Major general Clarence A. Martin died at his home in Greenville on December 11, 1986, aged 90 and was buried at Woodlawn Memorial Park there.

== Decorations ==
Here is the list of Martin's decorations with ribbon bar:

Combat Infantryman Badge
1st Row	Distinguished Service Cross		Army Distinguished Service Medal
2nd Row	Silver Star with two Oak Leaf Clusters	Legion of Merit	Air Medal
3rd Row	World War I Victory Medal with two battle clasps	American Defense Service Medal	Asiatic–Pacific Campaign Medal with three 3/16-inch service stars
4th Row	World War II Victory Medal	Distinguished Service Order, Honorary Companion	Philippine Liberation Medal with one star
Presidential Unit Citation

Military offices
Preceded by Duncan G. Richart	Commanding General, Fort Jackson; January 1946 – May 1946	Succeeded by John H. Church
Preceded by John C. Persons	Commanding General, 31st Infantry Division; September 1944 – December 1945	Succeeded by Deactivated
