= Landing at Saidor =

Allied amphibious landing of World War II

- Part of World War II, Pacific War
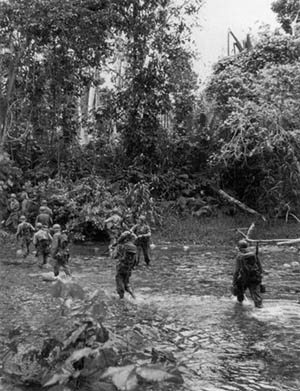
- Troops of the 32nd Infantry Division near Saidor.
Date	2 January 1944 – 10 February 1944
Location	05°37′30″S 146°28′21″E, Territory of New Guinea
Result	Allied victory

Belligerents
United States; Australia	Japan

Commanders and leaders
(United States) Walter Krueger; (United States) Clarence A. Martin	(Empire of Japan) Hatazō Adachi

Strength
15,000	6,000

Casualties and losses
(United States) American: 40 killed; 111 wounded; 16 missing; (Australia) Australian: 3 killed; 5 wounded	(Empire of Japan) Japanese: 853 killed; 66 captured; 1,793 found dead

The landing at Saidor, codenamed Operation Michaelmas, was an Allied amphibious landing at Saidor, Territory of New Guinea on 2 January 1944 as part of Operation Dexterity during World War II. An airbase at Saidor could secure the Dampier and Vitiaz Straits, the ultimate objective of General Douglas MacArthur's Huon Peninsula campaign, but the immediate objective was to cut off the 6,000 Imperial Japanese troops retreating from Sio in the face of the Australian advance from Finschhafen.

The landing at Saidor was conducted by a task force drawn from the U.S. 32nd Infantry Division. It was lightly opposed, as the Japanese 20th and 51st Divisions elected to retreat rather than fight and withdrew over the foothills of the rugged Finisterre Range. For the Japanese soldiers involved, the march was a nightmare, as they struggled through the jungles, across the swollen rivers, and over cliffs and mountains. Men succumbed to fatigue, disease, starvation, drowning, and even exposure, the nights in the Finisterres being bitterly cold. Hampered by the rugged terrain, inclement weather, signal failures, misunderstandings, over-caution, and above all the resolute and resourceful Japanese, the Americans were unable to prevent large numbers of the retreating Japanese from slipping past them.

After considerable construction effort in the face of wet weather, the airbase was completed and proved useful. The capture of the airstrip at Saidor allowed the construction of an airbase to assist Allied air forces in operations against Japanese bases at Wewak and Hollandia. Whereas the base at Nadzab was surrounded by mountains and was therefore unsuited for missions that had to take off after dark, there was no such problem at Saidor. During March 1944, B-24 Liberator bombers staged through Saidor for night attacks on Hollandia.

== Background ==
Fighting in the South West Pacific Area in late 1943 and early 1944 was dominated by General Douglas MacArthur's Operation Cartwheel, a series of operations directed at isolating and neutralising Rabaul, the main base of the Imperial Japanese forces in the South West Pacific Area. MacArthur's original Elkton III plan called for Australian troops to capture first Lae, then Finschhafen, and finally Madang with a combination of airborne and amphibious assaults. However, it was a long way from Finschhafen to Madang—178 miles (286 km). Thinking in terms of a shore-to-shore operation, which would be limited in radius of action to the distance that landing craft could sail in one night, the Commander of Allied Land Forces, General Sir Thomas Blamey recommended in August 1943 that an intermediate objective be seized first. Saidor was chosen as it had accessible beaches, a harbour, and a pre-war airstrip, and it was allocated the codename "Michaelmas" by MacArthur's General Headquarters (GHQ). It was recognised that the capture of Saidor might make that of Madang redundant, as both could cover the Dampier and Vitiaz Straits, and both could provide airbases close to the Japanese base at Wewak. For the time being though, both were considered objectives.

On 22 September 1943, Australian forces landed to the north of Finschhafen. In the Battle of Finschhafen, the Japanese wrested back the initiative. This prevented the early occupation of Saidor and threatened to derail MacArthur's strategy, but the Japanese failed to dislodge the Australian 9th Division or prevent the occupation of the Finschhafen area. In the subsequent Battle of Sattelberg in November, the Australians drove the Japanese from the Finschhafen area. The 9th Division initiated a pursuit of Lieutenant General Hatazō Adachi's retreating Japanese Eighteenth Army on 5 December 1943. Adachi was in a precarious position, attempting to conduct a fighting withdrawal with his inland right flank vulnerable to attack from the Australian 7th Division in the Ramu Valley and his seaward left flank open to amphibious assault. That he had an opportunity to destroy Adachi's army was not lost on MacArthur, who decided on 10 December 1943 that Saidor should be seized on or about 7 January 1944, provided that Operation Backhander, the landing at Cape Gloucester, was proceeding satisfactorily. On 17 December, Lieutenant General Walter Krueger, the commander of Alamo Force, received orders setting a target date for Saidor of 2 January 1944.

Alamo Force was a task force operating directly under MacArthur's command. Its headquarters staff were drawn from that of Krueger's Sixth United States Army. During the planning phase of Operation Dexterity, which included the Arawe, Cape Gloucester and Saidor operations, it was located at Milne Bay. It moved to Goodenough Island on 21 October 1943 and then Cape Cretin on 24 December 1943. The Cape Cretin location proved so congenial that the rear echelon of Alamo Force headquarters moved there from Goodenough and Sixth Army headquarters from Brisbane. The combined Sixth Army and Alamo Force headquarters opened at Cape Cretin on 2 February 1944.

== Preparation ==
Krueger selected the 32nd Infantry Division for the Saidor operation as it was staging at Goodenough Island for the assault on Gasmata, but this operation had been cancelled. It had then become the Alamo Force reserve for Arawe and Cape Gloucester, but was not committed. The assistant division commander, Brigadier General Clarence A. Martin, was appointed commander of Michaelmas Task Force, which was built around the 126th Infantry Regimental Combat Team, which had originally been organised for the Gasmata operation. The 126th Infantry Regiment had been rebuilt after the Battle of Buna–Gona and had received six weeks' amphibious training in Australia and a further three weeks' training at Milne Bay. Units assigned to the task force were at Goodenough Island, Milne Bay, Oro Bay, Lae, Finschhafen, Port Moresby, Kiriwina, Arawe, and Cape Cretin, and in Australia.

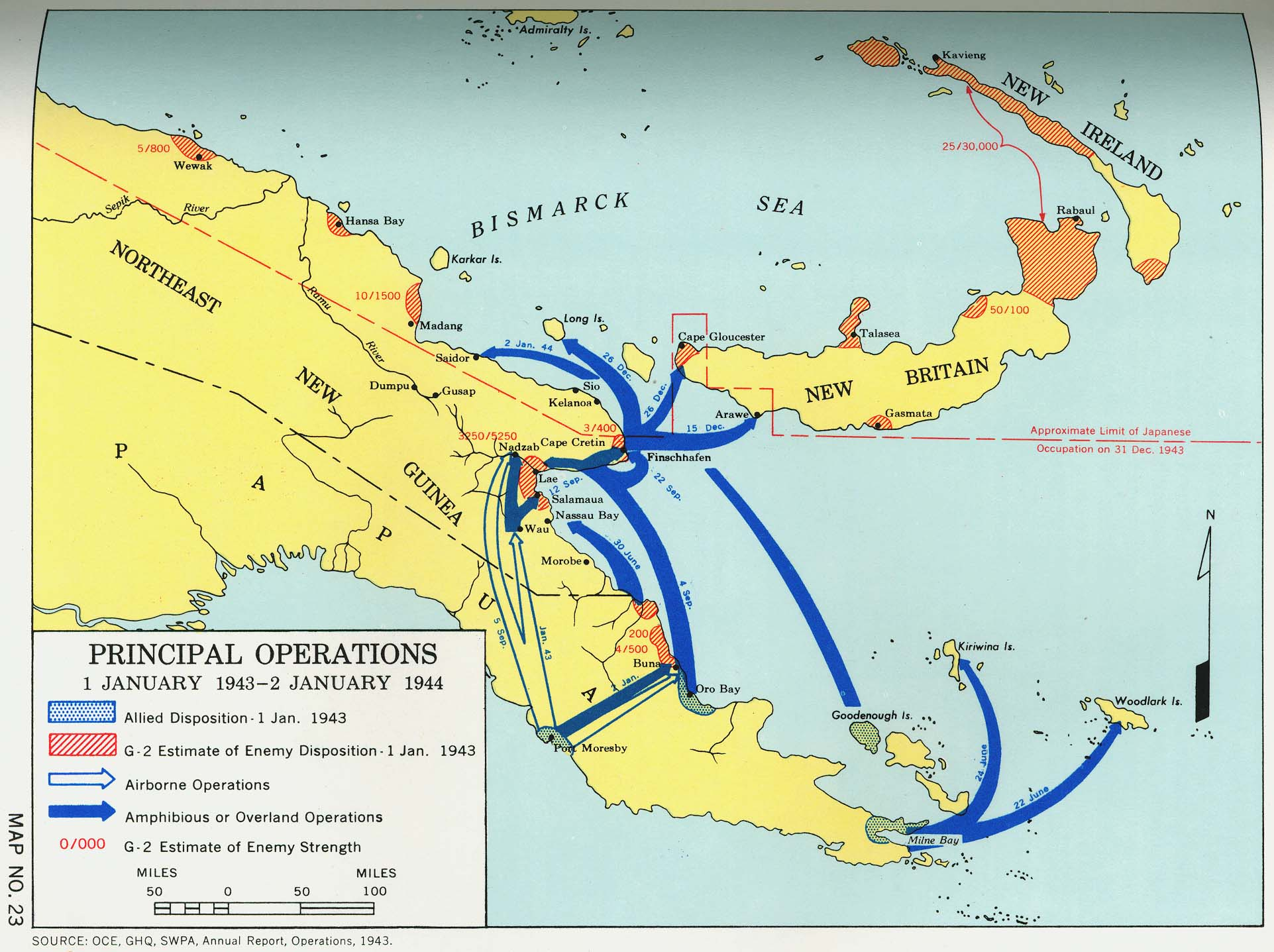
Principal Operations in the South West Pacific, January 1943 – January 1944.

The mission of Michaelmas Task Force was to (1) seize and defend the Saidor area; (2) establish facilities for a fighter group; (3) assist in the establishment of air forces in the area; (4) assist in the establishment of light naval forces in the area; and (5) construct minimal port and base facilities. It did not contain any explicit instruction about engaging the Japanese or cutting off their retreat. Lieutenant General Frank Berryman's Australian II Corps would advance along the coast, while the Australian 7th Division would contain Japanese forces in the Bogadjim area by fighting patrols.

Maps were supplied by the Australian Survey Corps. There was insufficient time and opportunity for ground reconnaissance, so three beaches, codenamed Red, White, and Blue, on the west shore of Dekays Bay were selected from aerial photographs. They proved to be "narrow, rocky and exposed to heavy seas". The intelligence staff at GHQ in Brisbane believed that there were no more than 4,500 Japanese forward of Sio, and only 1,500 more between there and the Madang area. They estimated that if the Japanese decided to counter-attack at Saidor, they would take a week to bring up 3,000 men. (Note: This was a gross under-estimate; there might have been as many as 20,000 Japanese forward of Sio in December.) Accordingly, Martin elected to dispense with a preliminary aerial bombardment. Removing this requirement permitted a dawn landing.

The assault troops with their supplies and equipment had to be loaded on board the ships on 31 December 1943, just five days after the assault on Cape Gloucester. Rear Admiral Daniel E. Barbey's VII Amphibious Force allotted six Landing Ships, Tank (LSTs), ten High speed transports (APDs) and seventeen Landing Craft Infantry (LCIs). A last-minute hitch developed on 30 December when it was discovered that only nine APDs would be available. New embarkation tables were drawn up, shifting personnel not required in the assault waves to LCIs, and the landing schedule was revised in the light of the reduced number of landing craft.

The difficulty of simultaneously supplying operations at Saidor, Arawe, Long Island, and Cape Gloucester was sufficiently daunting for Krueger to request a postponement of the Saidor operation; but the commander of the Allied Naval Forces and the United States Seventh Fleet, Vice Admiral Thomas C. Kinkaid, assured MacArthur that enough supplies would be delivered, and MacArthur overruled Krueger. "I am most anxious that if humanly possible this operation take place as scheduled," MacArthur informed him, "Its capture will have a vital strategic effect which will be lost if materially postponed."

== Operations ==
=== Landing ===
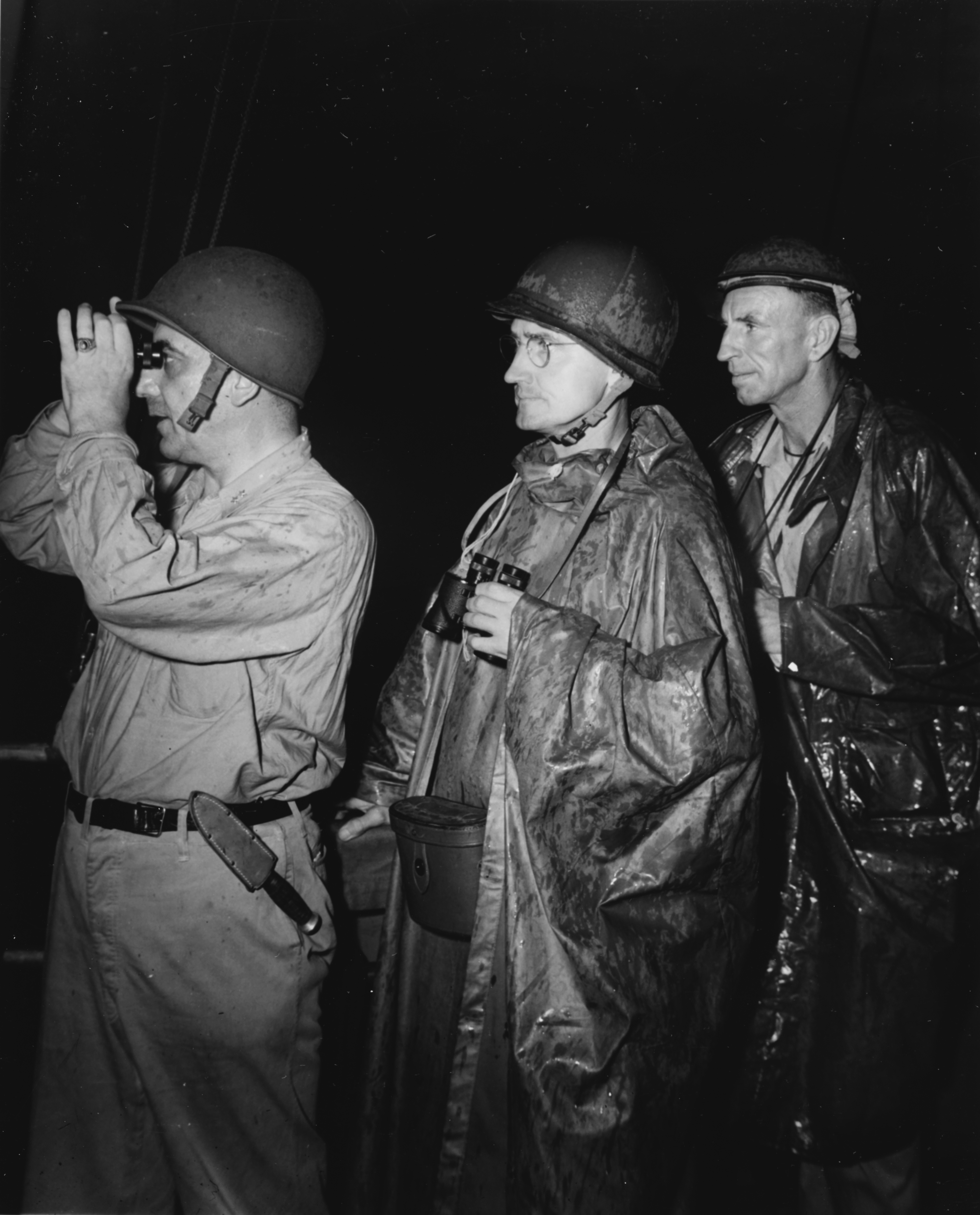
Rear Admiral Daniel E. Barbey, Brigadier General Clarence A. Martin, and Brigadier Ronald Hopkins observe the landing at Saidor.

The ships and landing craft were escorted by the destroyers USS Beale, Mahan, Drayton, Lamson, Flusser, Reid, Smith and Hutchins. The force arrived at Dekays Bay before dawn on 2 January 1944 to find the shore obscured by low hanging clouds and drizzling rain. Admiral Barbey postponed H-Hour from 06:50 to 07:05 to provide more light for the naval bombardment, and then to 07:25 to allow the landing craft more time to form up. The destroyers fired 1,725 5-inch rounds, while rocket-equipped LCIs fired 624 4.5-inch rockets. There was no concurrent aerial bombardment, but Fifth Air Force B-24 Liberators, B-25 Mitchells and A-20 Havocs bombed Saidor airstrip later that morning.

The first wave, carrying the assault troops of the 126th Infantry, reached the shore at about 07:30. The first four waves of Landing Craft, Personnel (Ramped) (LCP(R)) from the APDs arrived over the next 15 minutes. Each of the six LSTs in the assault towed a Landing Craft Mechanized (LCM) of the 2nd Engineer Special Brigade; two carried bulldozers, two carried rocket equipped DUKWs, and two carried spare diesel fuel. The LCMs beached shortly before 08:30 and the LSTs soon after. The Shore Battalion, 542nd Engineer Boat and Shore Regiment, laid Australian Reinforcing Company (ARC) mesh to provide a roadway across the beach for vehicles.

All six LSTs were unloaded by 11:45. There was little opposition. Eleven Japanese soldiers were killed by the naval bombardment or assault troops. Perhaps as many as 150 transient Japanese troops were in the Saidor area, all of whom fled into the interior. American casualties on the day of the landing came to one soldier killed and five wounded, and two sailors drowned. Nine Japanese Nakajima Ki-49 (Helen) aircraft, escorted by up to twenty A6M Zero (Zeke) and Kawasaki Ki-61 (Tony) fighters bombed the beach area at 16:30. There were three more air raids during the night, and 49 over the course of the month, but most were small.

MacArthur announced the landing in his communiqué the next day:

We have seized Saidor on the north coast of New Guinea. In a combined operation of ground, sea and air forces, elements of the Sixth Army landed at three beaches under cover of heavy air and naval bombardment. The enemy was surprised both strategically and tactically and the landings were accomplished without loss. The harbour and airfields are in our firm grasp. Enemy forces on the north coast between Sixth Army and the advancing Australians are trapped with no source of supply and face disintegration and destruction.

=== Japanese response ===
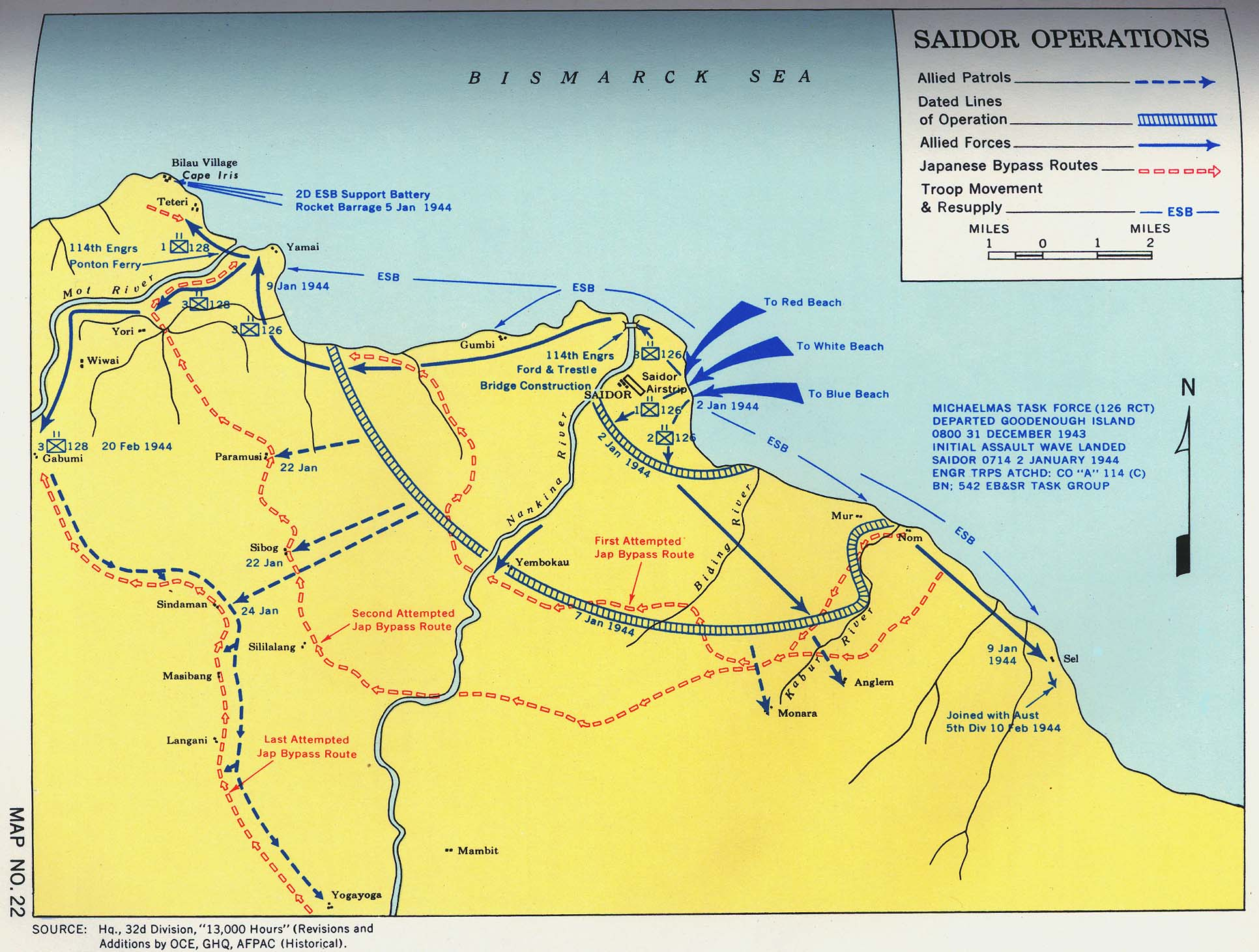
Saidor Operation, January 1944.

Since October 1943, the Japanese strategy had been to conduct a fighting withdrawal in the face of MacArthur's advance that would "trade position, to the end that the enemy offensive will be crushed as far forward as possible under the accumulation of losses". At General Hitoshi Imamura's Japanese Eighth Area Army headquarters at Rabaul, the staff debated whether the 20th and 51st Divisions should attack Saidor or slip past it and join up with the rest of the Eighteenth Army at Wewak. In view of the poor condition of the 20th and 51st Divisions, Imamura relieved the Eighteenth Army of responsibility for the Sio area and ordered Adachi to withdraw to Madang.

Adachi had flown from Madang to the 51st Division's headquarters at Kiari in late December, and he received word of the landing at Saidor shortly before heading overland to the 20th Division's headquarters at Sio, where he received Imamura's orders. He placed Lieutenant General Hidemitsu Nakano of the 51st Division in overall command of the forces east of Saidor and ordered the 41st Division to move from Wewak to Madang to defend that area. He then departed for Madang by submarine. To harass Saidor, he withdrew eight companies from Major General Masutaro Nakai's force facing Major General Alan Vasey's Australian 7th Division in the Finisterres. The Nakai force deployed along the Mot River around Gambumi. It succeeded in repelling American attempts to cross the river until 21 February, when it withdrew, its mission complete. However, weakening the Finisterres front provoked an Australian attack, resulting in the loss of the entire Kankirei position.

Nakano organised the withdrawal of his force. He chose two routes, one following the coast and the other running along the ridge lines of the foothills of the Finisterres. Initially, the 20th Division was to take the coastal route while the 51st and some naval units took the inland one, but this was changed at the last minute and both divisions took the inland route. Additional rations and supplies were to be delivered by submarine. However, the 51st Division elected to move out rather than wait for the submarines and risk exhausting its rations through waiting. The 51st Division had experience crossing the mountains before, and Nakano was confident of its ability to negotiate them. In the event, one submarine was discovered by Allied aircraft and failed to reach its objective, while a second was discovered and sunk. A third got through but it was a small type that was only able to carry five tons of supplies, which were distributed among units of the 20th Division.

The difficulty of the march had been underestimated, and sick and wounded men had to make their way through trackless regions. Lieutenant General Kane Yoshihara, the Chief of Staff of the Eighteenth Army, recalled the march:

The most wearing part was that with these ranges, when they climbed to the craggy summit they had to descend and then climb again, and the mountains seemed to continue indefinitely, until they were at the extreme of exhaustion. Especially when they trod the frost of Nokobo Peak they were overwhelmed by cold and hunger. At times they had to make ropes out of vines and rattan and adopt "rock-climbing" methods; or they crawled and slipped on the steep slopes; or on the waterless mountain roads they cut moss in their potatoes and steamed them. In this manner, for three months, looking down at the enemy beneath their feet, they continued their move. Another thing which made the journey difficult was the valley streams, which were not usually very dangerous. At times, however, there was a violent squall, for which the Finisterres are famous during the rainy season; then these valley streams for the time being flowed swiftly and became cataracts. Then there were many people drowned ... Lieutenant General Ryoichi Shoge was swept away by one of these streams on one occasion but fortunately managed to grasp the branch of a tree which was near the bank and was able to save one of his nine lives.

The first troops reached Madang on 8 February, and the whole movement was complete by 23 February. Eighteenth Army anticipated that units reaching Madang would probably have lost much of their equipment, so stores were gathered together from distant Wewak and Hansa, and collected together near Madang. In addition emergency articles such as some food, shoes and clothing were collected near the mouth of the Minderi River, supplied by the Nakai Detachment. The two divisions had about 20,000 men between them in December 1943; about 10,000 reached Madang.

=== Junction with the Australians ===
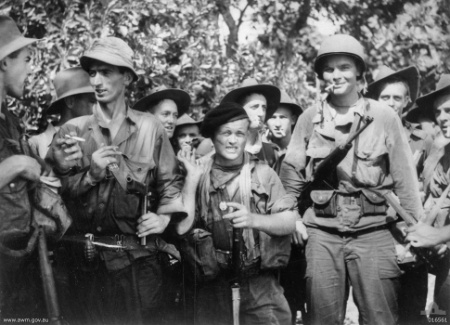
Australian and American troops meet near Saidor on 15 February 1944.

American patrols which attempted to reach the track in the Sindaman area encountered aggressive Japanese patrols. An observation post in the mountains at Mambit counted 965 Japanese troops passing through Yagoyoga between 6 and 10 February and 2,613 between 11 and 23 February. Perhaps another 1,000 passed through before 6 February. Stragglers were still passing through on 25 February. From prisoners of war, the Michaelmas Task Force built up a fairly complete and accurate picture of the identity and strength of the opposing Japanese forces, which numbered about 6,000. On 12 January, Martin received intelligence from Alamo Force to the effect that the Japanese were concentrating around Sio, and would attempt to force their way through to Madang. In response to a request from Martin for reinforcements, the 1st and 3rd Battalion Combat Teams of the 128th Infantry Regiment were sent to reinforce Saidor, arriving on 16 January. Martin came to believe that an advance to the east and an attack on the withdrawing enemy would "provide an opportunity to destroy the Japanese before they could organise an attack on the Saidor position".

Krueger did not immediately give Martin permission for such an operation. There was still the possibility of Japanese attack, and the 32nd Infantry Division was required for the upcoming Hansa Bay operation. On 20 January, a visiting staff officer from Alamo Force was asked to informally raise the possibility with Krueger. However, on 21 January Martin received a letter stating that the mission of the Michaelmas Task Force remained unchanged and a radiogram was received on 22 January to the effect that an offensive operation was inconsistent with Krueger's wishes. On 8 February, Martin received a garbled radiogram from Krueger that indicated that the earlier restrictive message of 22 January had itself been garbled, and on 9 February a radiogram was received authorising offensive action. Plans were immediately made but on 10 February contact was made with elements of the Australian 5th Division, which had relieved the 9th Division on 20 January. This closed the gap on the east flank.

The Australian official historian David Dexter concluded that:

The threat of enemy counter-attacks which had been further magnified by native reports, had already delayed the transition from the defensive to the offensive and the torrential rains, which rendered all tracks and rivers impassable caused great difficulty with the movement of troops and supplies to outlying sectors. Japanese units, brought from Madang, blocked access to the main escape routes, and although the task force pushed its attacks and patrolled vigorously, efforts to prevent the escape of the Japs retiring before the Australians were not completely successful.

There were daily clashes between American and Japanese patrols. The most significant occurred on 28 January. A patrol from the 1st Battalion, 128th Infantry Regiment led by First Lieutenants George J. Hess and James E. Barnett, with 48 enlisted men, set out to reconnoitre the area around Cape Iris. The patrol initially moved parallel to the coast, but near the village of Teterei it changed direction and headed towards the beach. On reaching it, the patrol was attacked by the Japanese. It attempted to withdraw along the beach, but found it blocked and was forced to return to the beach near Teterei. The patrol then divided into three groups, each of which attempted to make their way back through the jungle. The groups under Barnett and Sergeant Aaron Meyers made it to the American lines. The one under Hess reached the Mot River, but were unable to cross due to the swift current. Meyers informed the battalion commander, Lieutenant Colonel Gordon M. Clarkson, of the situation, and they quickly assembled a party to go to Hess's aid. They reached the river as Hess was attempting to swim across with a rope, but was being swept downstream, and formed a human chain to grab him. At that point, a Japanese machine gun opened fire on the rescue party, killing Staff Sergeant Victor L. Olson and fatally wounding Clarkson. Sergeant Thomas Reed managed to drag Clarkson away, but he died soon after. The rescue party was forced to withdraw. Eight of the 14 men in Hess's group, including Hess, were able to reach American lines during the night. Eight Americans were killed, including Clarkson, nine were wounded and six were missing, none of whom was seen alive again; 43 Japanese were reported killed. For this action, four men were awarded the Distinguished Service Cross, including Hess and, posthumously, Clarkson, and ten received the Silver Star.

== Base development ==
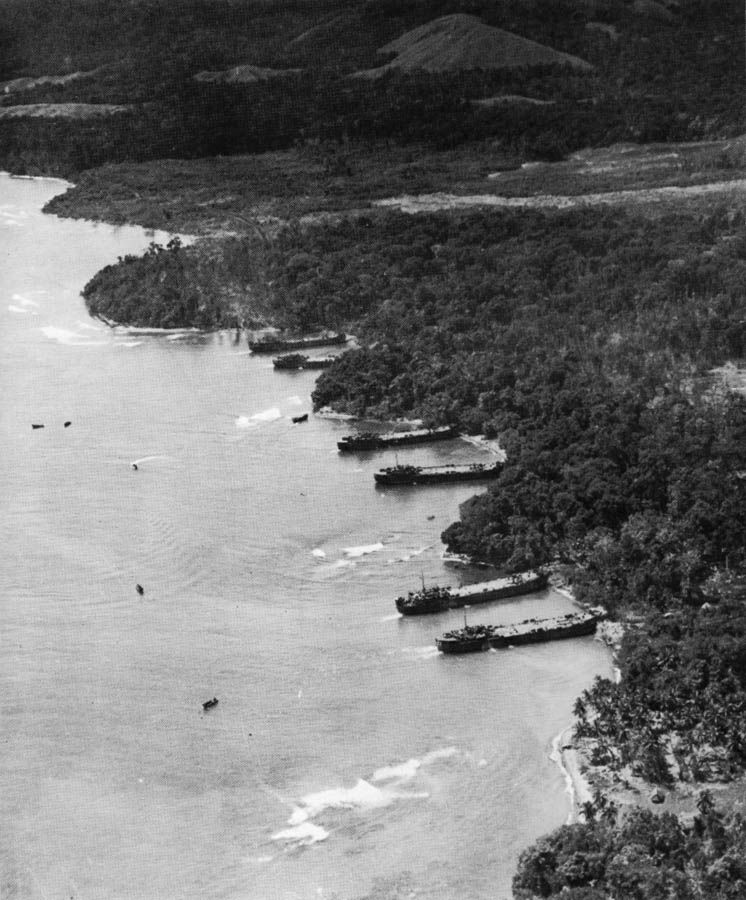
Aerial view of shoreline of Saidor, New Guinea, showing LSTs unloading equipment on 2 January 1944.

By 10 February, the Saidor garrison numbered 14,979, with a small naval detachment. With a large construction programme, engineers made up 29.3% of Michaelmas Task Force. An Engineer Section headquarters was organised on 24 December 1943, only nine days before landing, consisting of five officers and five enlisted men. Later a jeep and a driver were borrowed from the 114th Engineer Battalion to provide transportation. The officers did not know each other and therefore were unaware of each other's capabilities. As it turned out, none of them had experience with amphibious operations, and only one had experience in airbase construction, although this was to be their most important task.

Saidor had an existing grass civilian airstrip. Before they had abandoned it in 1942, Australian troops had sabotaged the airstrip by digging trenches across the runway. These were quickly filled in, and the overgrown Kunai grass was flattened by driving 2½-ton trucks over it. By the afternoon of 4 January, 1,800 feet (550 m) of runway was ready for use. A Piper Cub took off from it the next day. The 863rd Engineer Aviation Battalion arrived on 9 January and improved the strip, permitting twelve C-47 Skytrains loaded with ammunition to land on 11 January. Alamo Force wanted an all-weather runway 6,000 ft (1,800 m) by 100 ft (30 m), preferably where a second, parallel runway could be constructed if need be. Construction of the second runway was requested by the Fifth Air Force on 24 January. The 8th Engineer Squadron survey detachment laid out a new runway oriented about 10° from the existing airstrip.

The Michaelmas Task Force engineers had the entire site stripped, leaving the subgrade exposed. This was a serious error, as from 10 to 31 January there were only three days during which it did not rain, and 25 in (640 mm) of rain fell over the period—normal for the time of year. As a result, construction was delayed. Gravel was taken from the Nankina River which was laid up to 0.7 ft (20 cm) deep and topped with crushed aggregate. The rains, and frequent rolling, gave a good water-bound surface. Part was sealed with bitumen but delays caused by the weather prevented it all being sealed before being overlaid with Marston mats. The runway was declared ready for emergency landings on 4 February but the surface deteriorated under use. The runway was finally completed on 6 March. Construction of the taxiways and dispersal areas continued through April, with the airbase being complete and in operation on 7 May.

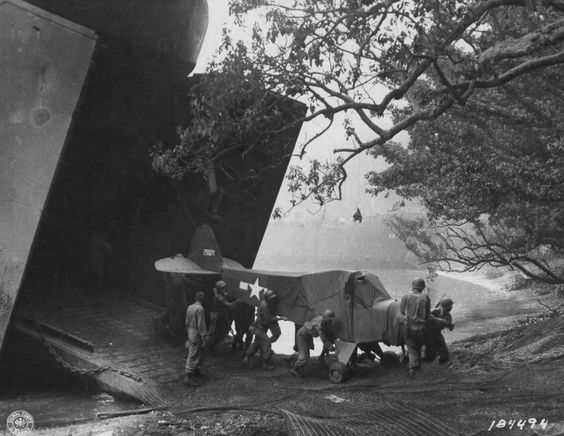
A Piper Cub observation plane arrives

On 5 March, the engineers began construction of the bulk petroleum installation. Storage was provided for 20,000 barrels (~2,700 t) of avgas in one 10,000-barrel (~1,400 t) tank and five 2,000-barrel (~270 t) tanks. A fuel jetty was constructed, allowing tankers to discharge into a pipeline which ran over a catwalk to the storage tanks. Work was completed on 8 April. Considerable effort had to be expended on road construction. The 808th Engineer Aviation Battalion had to be assigned to road work, the task being beyond the resources of the Shore Battalion. Gravel was laid up to 2 ft (60 cm) thick. By late January, the weather and damage to the roads by heavy military traffic forced the engineers to impose a ban on morning road use. By midday the sun had dried out the roads and traffic could resume.

Initially, the Nankina River could be forded but the heavy seasonal rains turned it into a fast-flowing torrent. A portable bridge was flown in from Milne Bay and erected in a day but it took two weeks to construct the approaches. In the meantime the troops on the other side had to be supplied by water. To open up the most suitable area for camp sites, another bridge had to be erected over the Nakina. This was a permanent bridge with concrete abutments. A rise in the river level of 8 ft (2.4 m) complicated work, but the 112 ft (34 m) bridge opened to traffic on 17 February.

Local labour was supplied by an Australian New Guinea Administrative Unit (ANGAU) detachment, initially consisting of eight Australian Army officers and eleven New Guinea police. A week after the landing, 199 civilian labourers were brought in from Lae. Initially, the ANGAU detachment found it difficult to lure the frightened local people in from the bush, but as the word spread that there was food and safety to be had within the American perimeter, large numbers began to walk in. ANGAU established a settlement in the Biding River area. By 13 February, 680 labourers were at work. They constructed camps for the Americans, carried supplies to units in the mountains and brought back the wounded, and worked in the hospital. ANGAU also carried out patrols, providing intelligence on the Japanese positions.

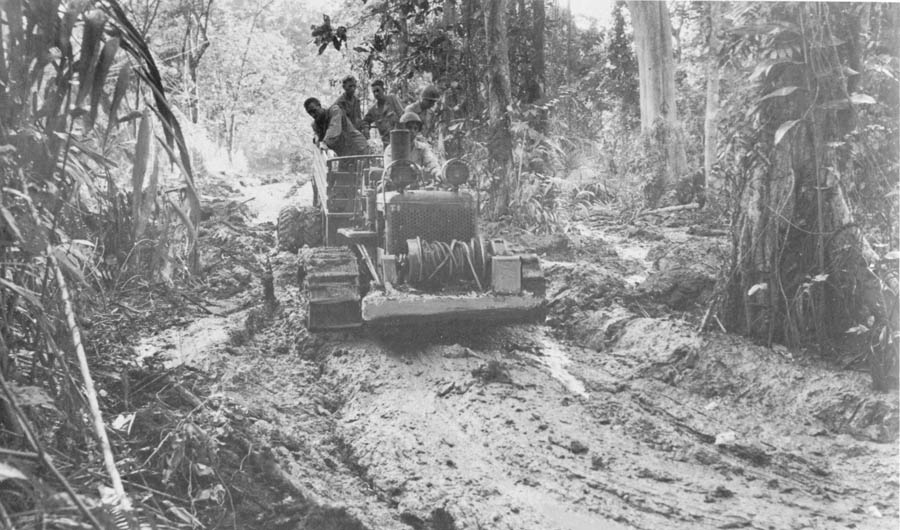
Engineers attempt to keep a road passable

The amphibian engineers had brought six LCMs on the first day. These were joined by another six towed by the six LSTs that arrived on the second day. Within days the rocky beaches and reefs had caused nine to be damaged so badly that they had to be sent back to Cape Cretin for repairs. Later in January, the rest of B Company, 542nd Engineer Boat and Shore Regiment was sent to Saidor. A 100 ft (30 m) lighter wharf was begun on 19 January and completed on 5 March. The unseasoned local timber used in its construction soon took a battering from heavily loaded barges bumping into them in high seas and had to be replaced with steel piles. A 330 ft (100 m) liberty ship wharf was completed on 6 May. Other construction activities included jetties for servicing PT boats, landings for LSTs, the 250-bed 23rd Field Hospital opened on 11 May, a quartermaster dump, and a staging area for 9,000.

== Air operations ==
Saidor was soon in use by the Fifth Air Force. Its base at Nadzab was surrounded by mountains and was therefore unsuited for missions that had to take off after dark, but there was no such problem at Saidor. During March, B-24 Liberator bombers staged through Saidor for night attacks on Hollandia. A raid on Hollandia on 16 April 1944 encountered a weather front that closed Nadzab and the other fields in the Markham Valley. More than 30 aircraft made their way to Saidor. An F-5 Lightning and a B-25 Mitchell collided on the runway, and two aircraft cracked up on landing, but the other aircraft that made it to Saidor eventually returned to their bases.

== Conclusion ==
In his memoir, Krueger wrote that "Michaelmas Task Force tried hard to block these escape routes. But the torrential rain, the ruggedness of the country with its impenetrable rain forests and jungles and impassable rivers, and the resistance of enemy troops pushed forward from Madang to guard the trails leading eastward, made this effort fall short of success". Australian commanders were critical. In a letter to Blamey, Berryman, who had visited Krueger in an attempt to ensure that the Japanese would not escape, wrote that "about 8,000 semi-starved, ill-equipped and dispirited Japanese bypassed Saidor. It was disappointing that the fruits of victory were not fully reaped, and that once again the remnants of the 51st Division escaped our clutches." Lieutenant General Sir Leslie Morshead of New Guinea Force reported to Blamey that Michaelmas Task Force appeared not to have made "any appreciable effort" to cut off the retreating Japanese. The men of the 32nd Infantry Division would later have to be fight many of these Japanese troops again under less advantageous circumstances in the Battle of Driniumor River. Krueger officially terminated Operation Dexterity, of which Michaelmas was a part, on 10 February 1944. All that remained now was the final act of the Huon Peninsula campaign: the capture of Madang.

== Casualties ==
In the Australian 5th Division's advance from Sio to Saidor between 20 January and the end of February, 734 Japanese were killed, 1,793 found dead, and 48 Japanese prisoners were taken. Australian and Papuan casualties came to 3 killed and 5 wounded. The US 32nd Infantry Division at Saidor killed 119 Japanese and captured 18, while losing 40 killed, 111 wounded, 16 missing.
