= Geerlings =

Geerlings is a Dutch surname. Notable people with the surname include:

- Ariana Geerlings (born 2005), Spanish tennis player
- Edgar A. Geerlings (born 1937), American politician
- Gerald K. Geerlings (1897–1998), American artist
- Jennifer Geerlings-Simons (born 1953), Surinamese physician and politician
- Jörg Geerlings (born 1972), German lawyer
- Renae Geerlings (born 1974), American actress
