= Ironwork =

Decorative iron object

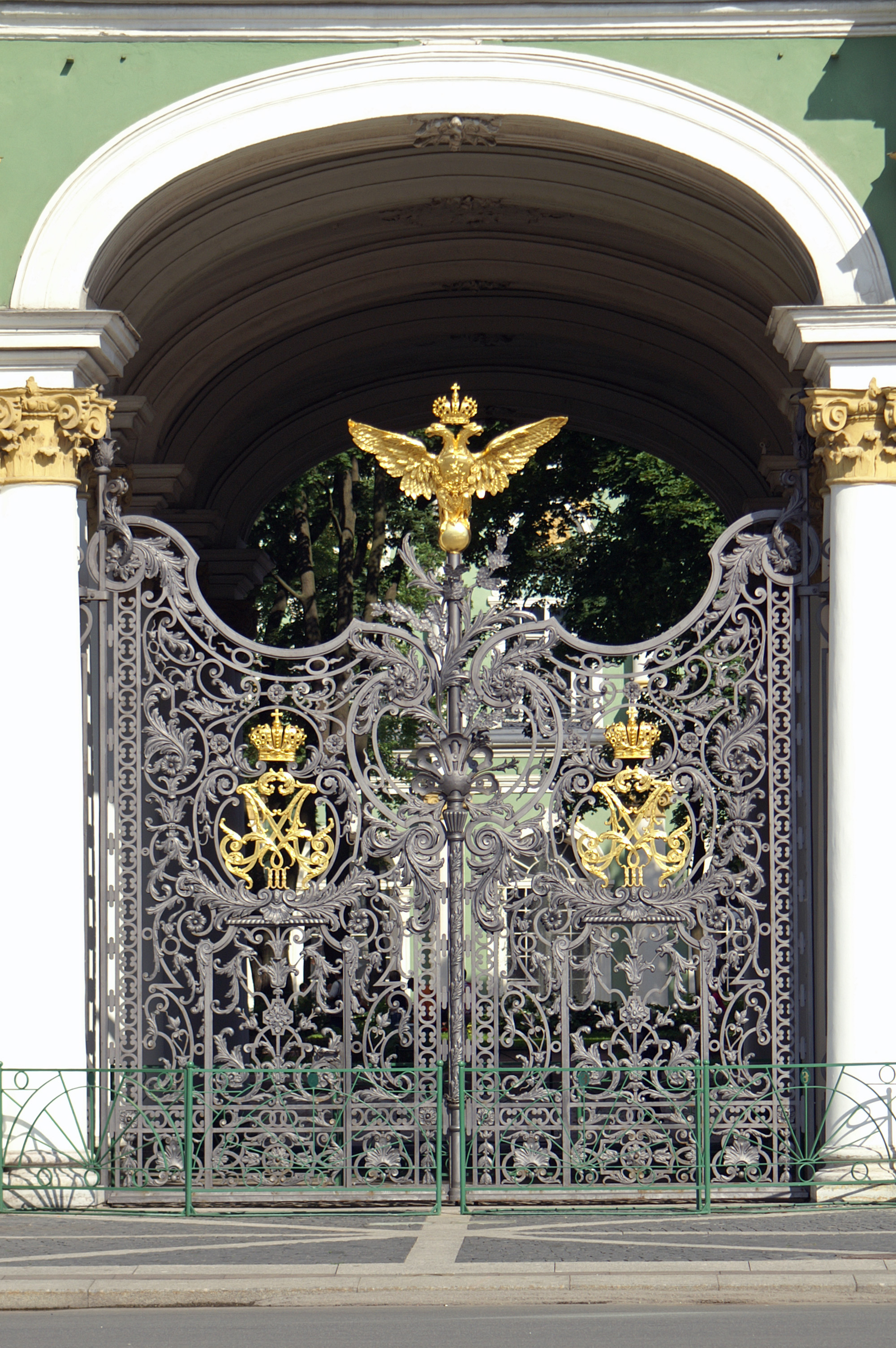
Gate of the Winter Palace in St Petersburg.

Ironwork is any weapon, artwork, utensil, or architectural feature made of iron, especially one used for decoration. There are two main types of ironwork: wrought iron and cast iron. While the use of iron dates as far back as 4000 BC, it was the Hittites who first knew how to extract it (see iron ore) and develop weapons. Use of iron was mainly utilitarian until the Middle Ages; it became widely used for decoration in the period between the 16th and 19th century.

== Wrought iron ==
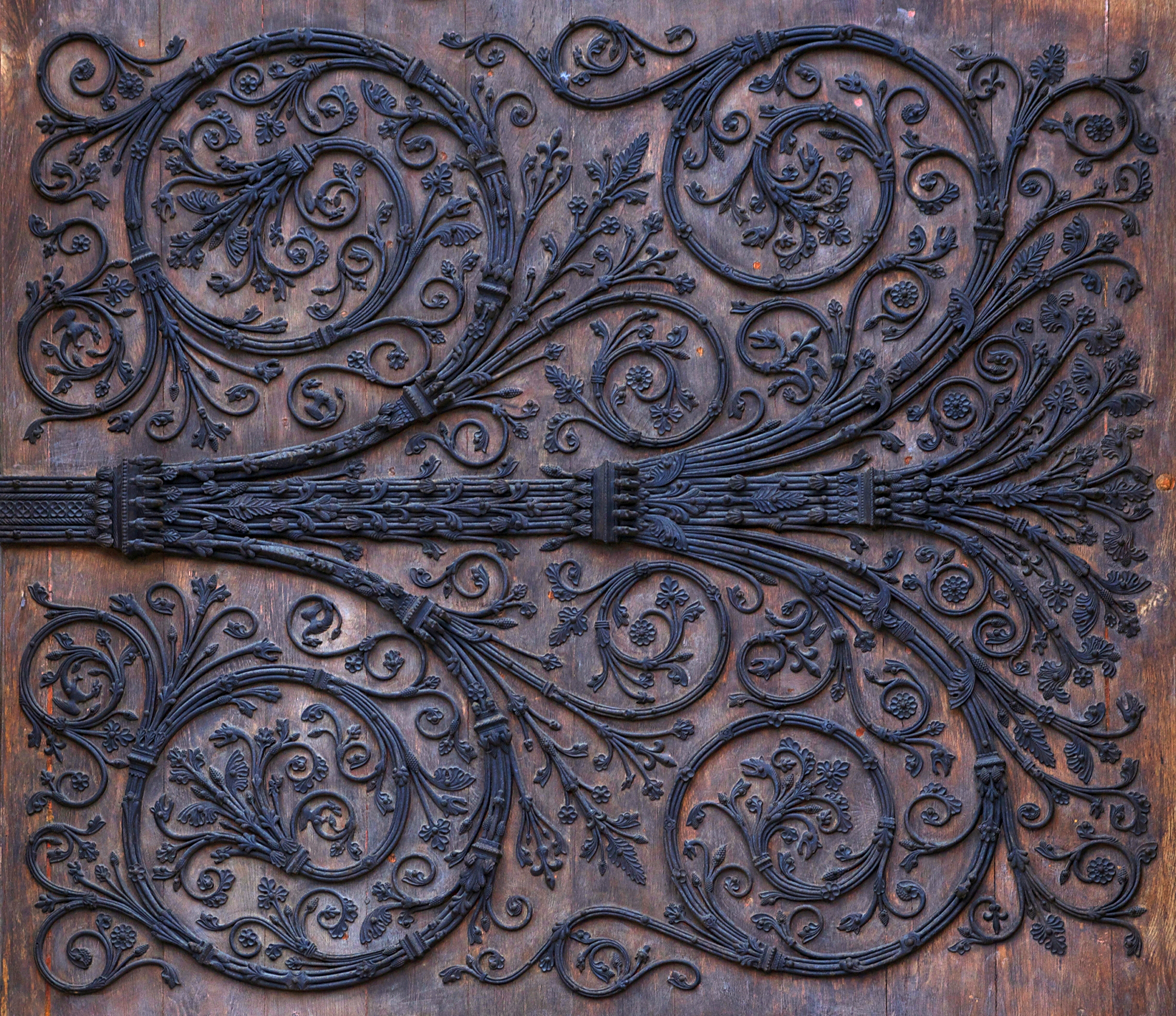
Details of ironwork on the central portal of the west facade of Notre Dame de Paris (France)

Wrought ironwork is forged by a blacksmith using an anvil. The earliest known ironwork are beads from Jirzah in Egypt dating from 3500 BC and made from meteoric iron with the earliest use of smelted iron dates back to Mesopotamia. However, the first use of conventional smelting and purification techniques that modern society labels as true iron-working dates back to the Hittites in around 2000 BC.

Knowledge about the use of iron spread from the Middle East to Greece and the Aegean region by 1000 BC and had reached western and central Europe by 600 BC. However, its use was primarily utilitarian for weapons and tools before the Middle Ages. Due to rusting, very little remains of early ironwork.

From the medieval period, use of ironwork for decorative purposes became more common. Iron was used to protect doors and windows of valuable places from attack from raiders and was also used for decoration as can be seen at Canterbury Cathedral, Winchester Cathedral and Notre Dame de Paris. Armour also was decorated, often simply but occasionally elaborately.

From the 16th century onwards, ironwork became highly ornate especially in the Baroque and Rococo periods. In Spain, elaborate screens of iron or rejería were built in all of the Spanish cathedrals rising up to nine metres high.

In France, highly decorative iron balconies, stair railings and gateways were highly fashionable from 1650. Jean Tijou brought the style to England and examples of his work can be seen at Hampton Court and St Paul's Cathedral. Wrought ironwork was widely used in the UK during the 18th in gates and railings in London and towns such as Oxford and Cambridge. In the US, ironwork features more prominently in New Orleans than elsewhere due to its French influence.

As iron became more common, it became widely used for cooking utensils, stoves, grates, locks, hardware and other household uses. From the beginning of the 19th century, wrought iron was being replaced by cast iron due to the latter's lower cost. However, the English Arts and Crafts movement produced some excellent work in the middle of the 19th century.

In modern times, much modern wrought work is done using the air hammer and the acetylene torch. A number of modern sculptors have worked in iron including Pablo Picasso, Julio González and David Smith.

== Cast iron ==
Cast iron is produced in a furnace stoked with alternate layers of coking iron then poured into molds. After the iron cools off, the sand is cleaned off. The Chinese were the first to use cast iron from the 6th century AD using it as support for pagodas and other buildings.

Then cast appeared in other countries and took a special place in Kyivan Rus' of the XI century. Metal was mainly turned into domes for churches, its utensils, and bells. Later it was developed for the military goals.

It was introduced into Europe by the 14th century with its main decorative uses being as firebacks and plates for woodburning stoves in Germany, the Netherlands and Scandinavia. By the end of the 18th century, cast iron was increasingly used for railings, balconies, banisters and garden furniture due to its lower cost.

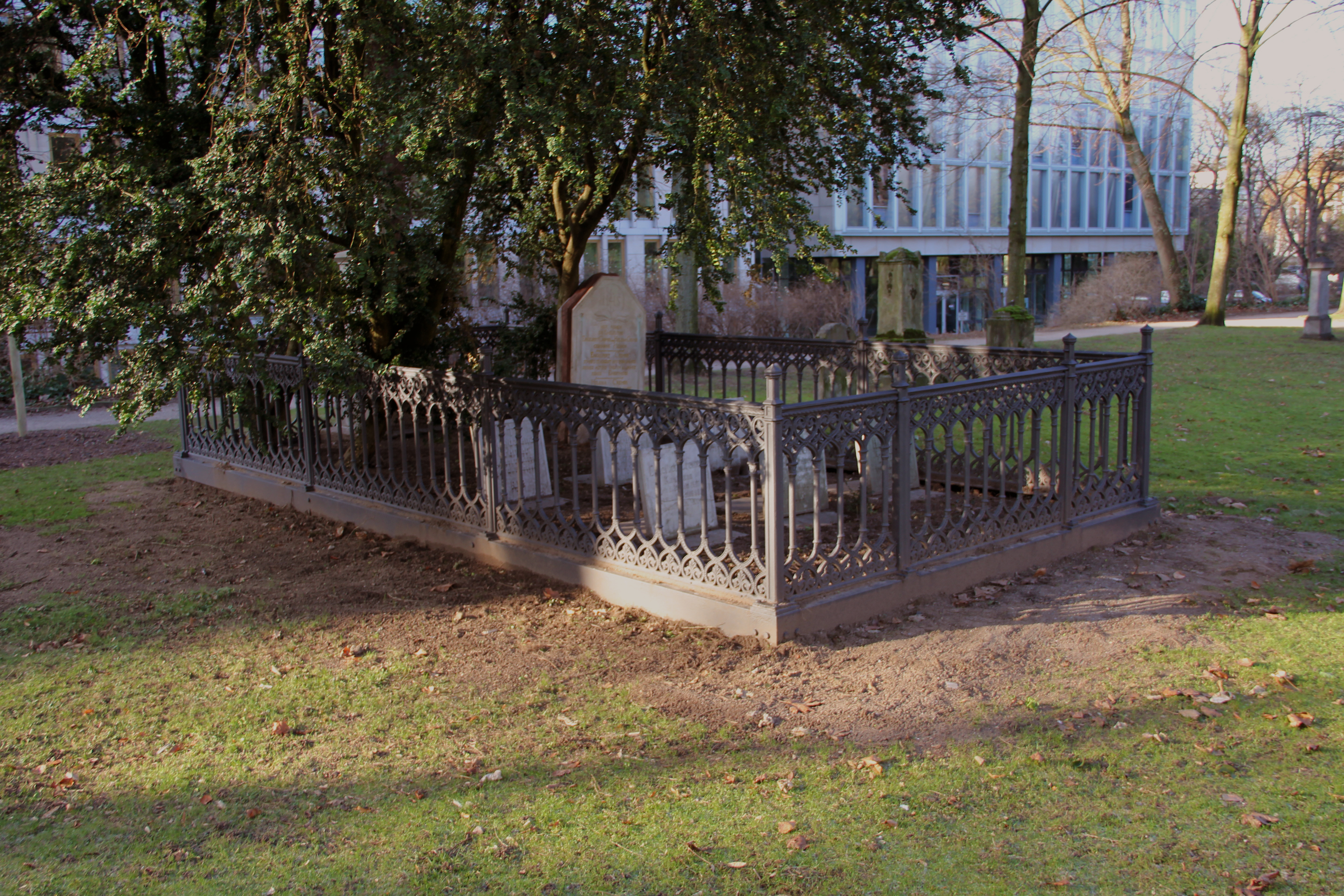
Cast iron fence

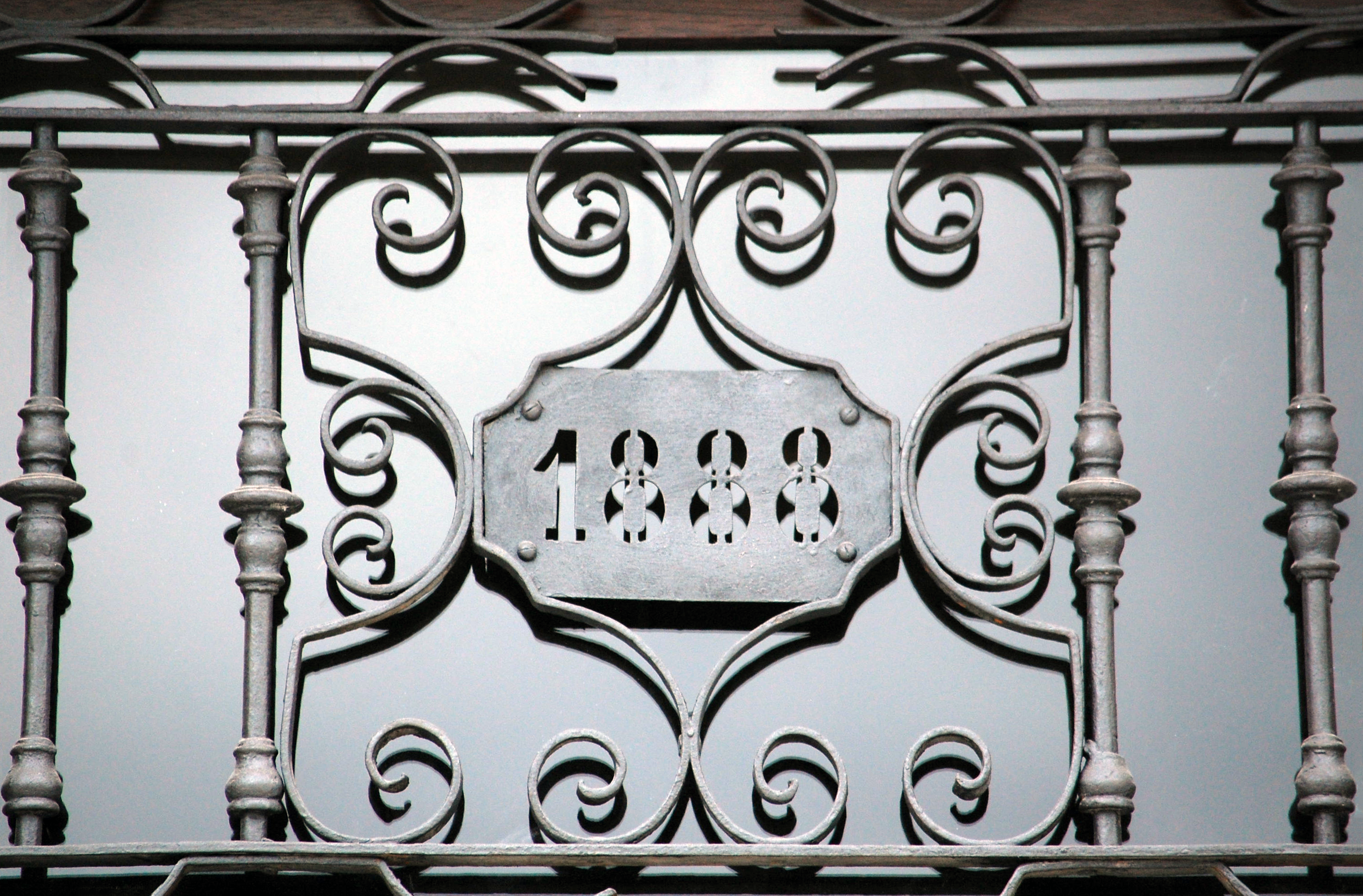
Ironwork on the "Edificio de las Cráteras" of Alcalá de Henares (Spain).

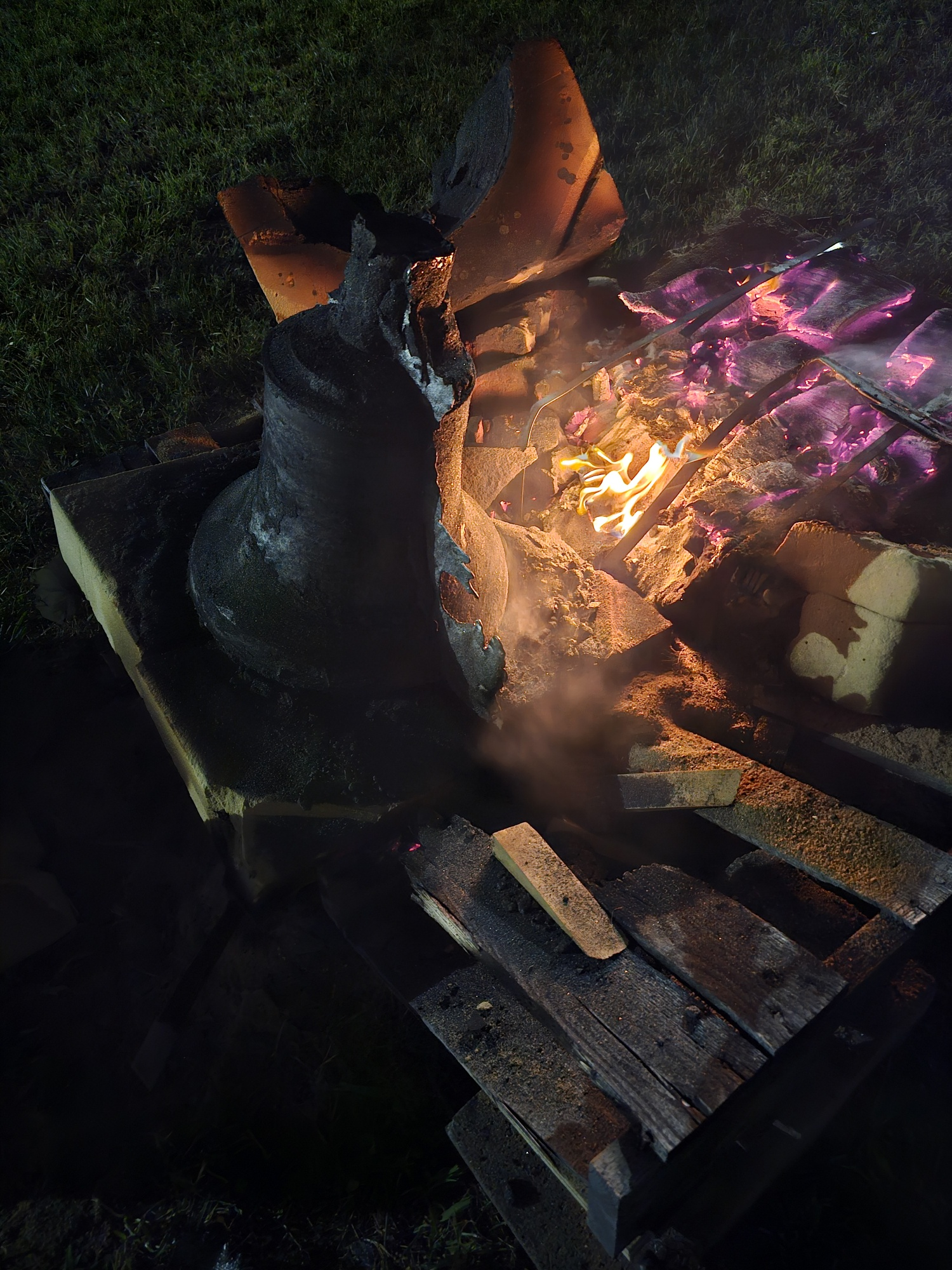
Iron bell cooling after iron pour

== See also ==
- Blacksmith
- Scrollwork
- Arabesque (European art)

== Sources ==
- John Starkie Gardner Ironwork Victoria & Albert Museum London 1978 Volume 1 ISBN 0-905209-00-1 Volume 2 ISBN 0-905209-01-X Volume 3 ISBN 0-905209-02-8 first published 1893
- Dona Z. Meilach, Decorative & Sculptural Ironwork: Tools, Techniques, Inspiration 2nd edition Schiffer Atglen PA 1999 ISBN 0-7643-0790-8
- Otto Höver A Handbook of Wrought Iron from the Middle Ages to the end of the Eighteenth Century translated by Ann Weaver Thames and Hudson London 1962
- Edward Graeme Robinson and Joan Robinson Cast Iron Decoration: A World Survey 2nd Edition Thames and Hudson 1994 ISBN 0-500-27756-7
- Gerald K. Geerlings, Wrought Iron in Architecture :; Wrought Iron Craftsmanship; Historical Notes and Illustrations of Wrought Iron in Italy, Spain, France, Holland, Belgium, England, Germany, America Bonanza Books 1957
- Theodore Menten, Art Nouveau Decorative Ironwork Dover Publications New York 1981 ISBN 0-486-23986-1
