= 632nd Regiment =

632nd Regiment may refer to:

- 632nd Armor Regiment, United States
- 632nd (St Pancras) Infantry Regiment, Royal Artillery
