= Gerald K. Geerlings =

American artist, architect, and author

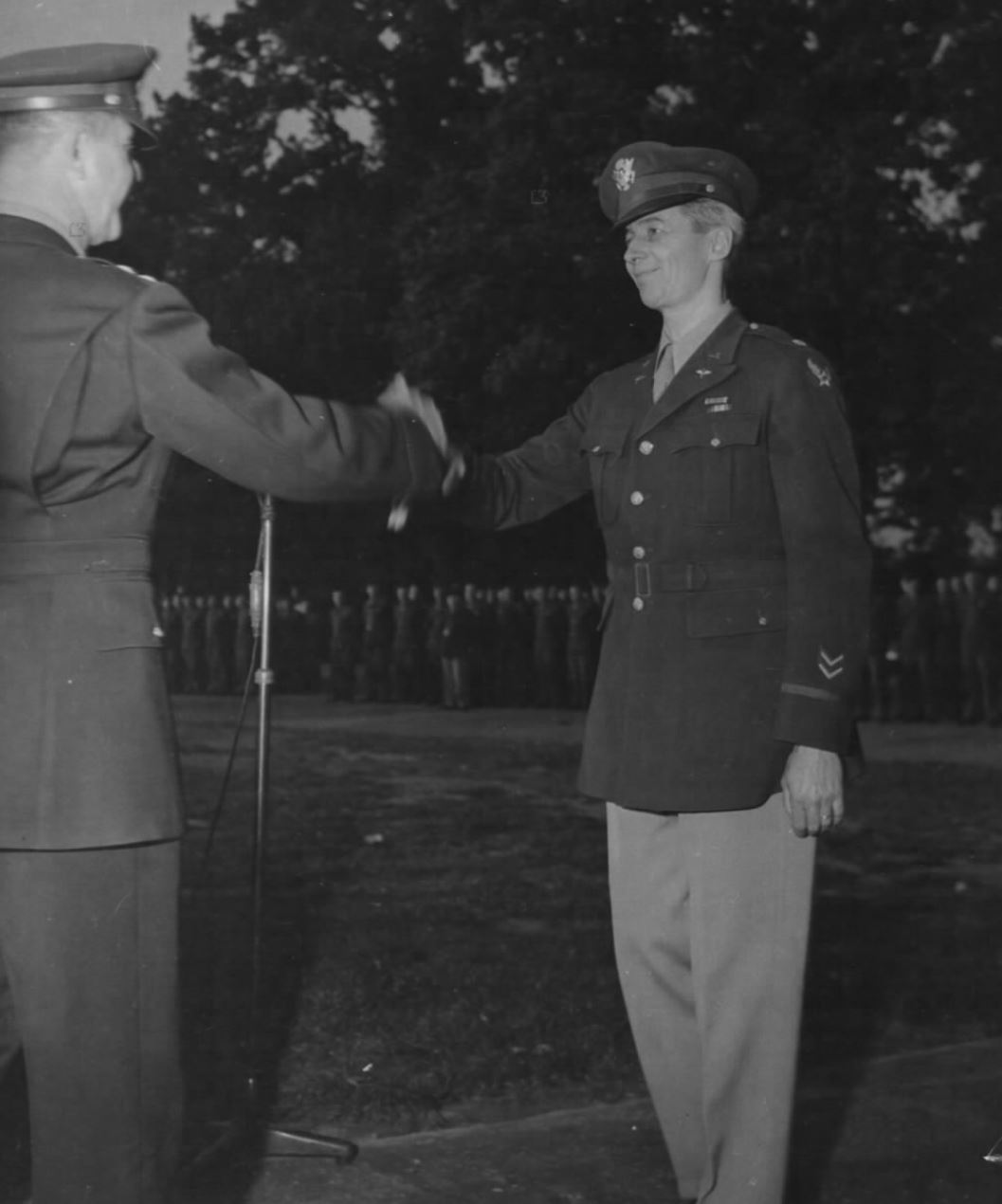
- Jacob Devers congratulates Geerlings after presenting him the Legion of Merit at a ceremony in Middlesex, England on October 16, 1943
- Born: April 18, 1897; Milwaukee, Wisconsin, U.S.
- Died: January 25, 1998 (aged 100); New Canaan, Connecticut, U.S.
- Resting place: Darien, Connecticut; 41.0608° N, 73.4844° W
- Education: University of Pennsylvania
- Known for: Architectural prints
- Spouse: Betty F. Geerlings (née Edmunds)

Gerald Kenneth Geerlings (April 18, 1897 – January 25, 1998) was an American artist, printmaker, architect, and author.

Geerlings is known for his early-20th century architectural etchings, aquatints, and intaglio prints depicting the rise of American metropolises and urbanization during the interwar period.

His prints showcase the Gilded Age and Art Deco architecture of American cities, often depicting the skylines and early skyscrapers of New York City and Chicago.

== Biography ==
Geerlings was born in Milwaukee, Wisconsin on April 18, 1897.

He lived most of his life in New Canaan, Connecticut, where he died on January 25, 1998, at the age of 100.

=== Early life ===
As a young man, Geerlings worked as an architectural draftsman and newspaper reporter. He then enrolled in art school. However, with the start of World War I, he was forced to interrupt his education and career ambitions to enlist in the U.S. Army.

=== Military career ===
==== World War I ====
In 1917, Geerlings began his military service with the 1st Battalion, 120th Field Artillery Regiment (also known as the "Red Fox Battalion") in Wisconsin Rapids. While with the Red Fox Battalion, Geerlings joined the 32nd Infantry Brigade Combat Team. By 1918, Geerlings had been promoted to second lieutenant.

His entire division was soon ordered to Europe. The 120th Field Artillery Landed at Liverpool, England and then traveled by rail to South Hampton and across the English Channel to Le Havre, France. The 120th Field Artillery went into action in the Château-Thierry sector on August 1, 1918, in support of the 32nd Divisional Artillery. After the 32nd Divisional Artillery had taken Juivgay, it was relieved by the 2nd Moroccan Division, which included the famous French Foreign Legion. The 120th Field Artillery remained in the line of support to the Foreign Legion, assisting in blasting a path for the final charge of the Foreign Legion.

==== World War II ====
Gerald Geerlings returned to the military to fight in World War II, this time joining the Army Air Forces. In 1942, while serving as Captain in the Command Office of the 8th Special Operations Squadron and 8th Air Force in England, Geerlings spearheaded critical cartographic innovations for the newly-formed Air Force and Allied forces. Adept at aerial perspective drawings, Geerlings devised target maps to aid Allied bombers in key aerial military campaigns through a key innovation in aerial combat.

Faced with the absence of adequate British and Allied force map coverage of Axis targets and areas of control (due to the fact that aerial missions of the time predominantly occurred at night, where detailed maps were not required and accuracy was seen as impossible), Geerlings devised a novel way to map strategic targets in order to fundamentally improve bombing accuracy and situational awareness for military aerial campaigns, allowing military air power and bombers to take an unprecedented front-seat in the execution of strategic military campaigns.

In a critical cartographic innovation of WWII, Gerald Geerlings developed the "perspective target map", also known as the "Geerlings map". These aerial target maps with unprecedented oblique views of approaches from the viewpoint of bombers in combat finally allowed Allied forces to perform strategic daytime aerial bombing strikes and aerial bombing campaigns for the first time in military history. These "Geerlings maps" were able to convert strategic topographical features and military targets visible to the eye at research centers to illustrations and maps depicting what navigators and bombardiers saw in real-time combat, providing pilots and bomber crews multiple views and approaches of targets instead of typical straight-down map views. Measuring 32 inches by 32 inches in size, Geerlings maps provided views of 6 different aerial approaches for any enemy target, depicted from a height of 26,000 feet as would be experienced by air force members in-flight. Utilizing techniques of "heightened abstraction", Geerlings created groundbreaking maps for World War II bombing campaigns—each approach provided 6 visualizations of strategic enemy targets, combining target views from 15 miles out (for use by navigators) with analogous views of from a distance of 7 miles out (for use by bombardiers).

In a departure from the era's use of maps in combat, Geerlings' perspective target maps provided unprecedented depictions of critical topographic features that were often obscured (or not captured) in traditional photo-reconnaissance materials and flat-view maps. Geerlings maps included important landmarks and enemy positions for effective bomber targeting, such as artillery positions, search lights, smokescreens, decoys, radars, and coastline views (including views of changing sea levels at different times of day). Previously, the absence of these features in military maps added significant challenges to nascent attempts at leveraging air combat for military campaigns.

During early WWII aerial missions, Allied bombers and air force navigators were often confused by discrepancies between intelligence photos and maps of strategic targets that were provided for air strikes, and the actual appearance of targets and land features seen to the naked eye in combat (e.g. buildings, forests, bridges, or railways that were meant to be used as target guides were found to be destroyed, obscured by smoke, or missing entirely). These unfortunate inaccuracies contributed to the failure of many early air combat missions and the general opinion among military commanders that strategic aerial combat was both "ineffective" and "unnecessary."

Geerlings' innovations in cartography bolstered the subsequent emergence and establishment of strategic bombing as a critical tool in military combat. Up to this point, military air power in WWI and WWII had been limited to providing ground troop support and performing daytime reconnaissance missions via slow, low-flying planes (often shot down from the ground by enemy artillery). Before the use of perspective target maps, aerial bombing campaigns largely relied on often-flawed photo-reconnaissance materials to visually identify key targets and were limited to night-time "area bombardment" missions, which had no particular targets and hinged on the general destruction of broad swaths of urban centers and areas of dense civilian populations with the goal of "demoralizing" the enemy into submission. The use of this strategy is exemplified by early WWII bombing campaigns, such as the bombing of London by German air forces during the Blitz.

Leveraging his development of innovative approaches to the identification and precision targeting of enemy targets, Geerlings originated and developed the "Target Identification Unit", ultimately becoming an Air Force intelligence officer and serving both the Royal Air Force and United States Air Force for the duration of World War II. In 1941, Geerlings was an important figure in the planning and execution of Operation Tidal Wave by Allied Forces. Armed with innovative bomber scopes (improving ground visibility) and Geerlings maps, Allied bombers were finally able to target and destroy strategic Axis oil fields and refineries located in Ploesti, Romania using precision bombing. During Operation Tidal Wave, all Allied bombers carrying Geerlings maps were also loaded with incendiary bombs, ensuring that any bombers downed or seized by enemy forces would self-destruct and preventing Geerlings maps from finding their way into enemy hands.

In 1943, Geerlings was awarded the Legion of Merit medal with an oak leaf cluster for his navigational and bombing innovations, which were used in the Battle of Ploiești. Gerald Geerlings served in both the European and the Pacific theaters of World War II. By 1944, Gerald Geerlings applied the lessons in innovating target maps to creating the first maps for another novel, emerging military technology—the use of radar for aerial military campaigns.

He retired from active service in 1945 holding the rank of colonel. Between 1948 and 1952, Geerlings served as a part-time civilian consultant to the Strategic Air Command Headquarters in Omaha, Nebraska. In 1953, Gerald Geerlings finally ended his long chapter as an active member of the armed forces.

=== Education ===
==== Undergraduate and graduate work ====
During World War I, Geerlings spent a number of years abroad. He was stationed in both England and France. Though his plans to complete his schooling had been by global conflict, after spending 18 months as a commissioned officer in France, he was invited to study at St John's College, Cambridge in England.

After World War I, Geerlings resumed his academic pursuits in the United States. In 1919, he enrolled in the University of Pennsylvania School of Design in Philadelphia, Pennsylvania. There, he earned both his undergraduate and graduate degrees. He completed his Bachelor of Architecture degree with summa cum laude honors in 1921, and received his Master of Architecture degree in 1922.

During his last year and a half at the University of Pennsylvania, Geerlings held an assistantship in architectural design under notable French-born Philadelphia architect and industrial designer, Paul Philippe Cret. For the 1921-1922 academic year, Gerald Geerlings was awarded the "Prix d'Emulation of the Société des Architects Diplomés par le Gouvernement Français".

Geerlings was also awarded the Arthur Spayd Brooke Memorial Prize in his senior (and graduate) years of study (receiving a silver medal and gold medal for his achievements, respectively). That same year, Geerlings won second place in the national Rome Prize competition, hosted by the American Academy in Rome.

==== Post-graduate work ====
Upon returning to Wisconsin, Geerlings continued his study of architecture under the guidance of the professors of the Chicago Art Institute.

In 1923, Geerlings was awarded the Henry Gillette Woodman Prize, and in the fall of 1924, Geerlings received a Woodman Traveling Fellowship from the University of Pennsylvania, allowing him one year's travel abroad.

With this, Geerlings embarked on a chapter of international travels and academic research. For the next eight years, Geerlings traveled between New York City and London in six-month intervals. While abroad, Gerald sketched constantly and honed his knowledge of European architecture, metalworking, and printmaking.

Gerald K. Geerlings pictured with his wife, Betty F. Geerlings (1924).

In 1928, Geerlings enrolled in an etching course at London's Royal College of Art, which he completed in 1932. Inspired by London's neoclassical architecture and his growing interest in lithography, Geerlings published his first academic project in 1928 with the help of his wife, Betty Filby Geerlings.

Published by Charles Scribner's Sons in New York, Color Schemes of Adam Ceilings compiled a limited collection of colorful lithographs, made from watercolor sketches that Betty and Gerald created together. These prints carefully reproduced original architectural studies of Robert Adam, whose renowned ornate designs graced many interiors of great English homes and estates.

Following the success of his folio of lithographs, Geerlings used his European research work to publish two books in 1929.

His first book explored metalworking and its applications in architecture (Metal Crafts in Architecture: Bronze, Brass, Cast Iron, Copper, Lead, Lighting Fixtures, Tin, Specifications).

In his second book published that year, Geerlings detailed the varieties of wrought iron decor found in classic European architecture (Wrought Iron in Architecture: Wrought Iron Craftsmanship; Historical Notes and Illustrations of Wrought Iron in Italy, Spain, France, Holland; Fixtures and Knockers; Specifications). These books remain leading reference works on the subjects of metalworking and wrought iron.

=== Architecture and graphic design ===
With his studies completed and his early academic works published, Gerald Geerlings returned to the U.S. to pursue his career in architecture. Geerlings joined the New York architectural firm of York & Sawyer alongside etcher and architect Louis C. Rosenberg. He then went on to work at Starrett & Van Vleck, but ultimately decided to open his own architectural practice.

During the 44 years of his architectural practice, Geerlings became an accomplished draftsman, designing many personal residences, and assisting with land planning.

Through the 1950s and 1960s, Geerlings worked as a graphic designer, illustrator, and a color consultant. Geerlings created graphic designs for advertisements and popular magazines of the time, such as Woman's Home Companion, Better Homes & Gardens, House & Home, House & Garden, and House Beautiful. As a regular contributor, Geerlings authored articles and columns on the topic of domestic architecture.

As a product consultant for companies such as Kohler Company, Remington-Rand, and Spalding, Geerlings assisted with product designs and their patents.

=== Art ===
==== Historical context ====
The turn of the 20th century ushered in a period of increased wealth and urbanization in the United States. The interwar years and the economic boom of 1920's led to a frenzy of real estate speculation and commercial development.

Technological innovations such as tube-frame structures, elevators, fireproofing, and structural steel led to the nation's first skyscraper projects, most notably in America's new financial centers, New York City and Chicago. Buildings now reached previously unseen heights. As described by historian Merrill Schleier, the 1920s set off a period of "skyscraper mania."

These architectural constructions became showcases of the period's popular aesthetic styles. Their designs were infused with elements of the Art-Deco movement, the Beaux-Arts architecture movement, the Chicago School of architecture, and neoclassical architecture.

==== Early work ====
Geerlings made his first print in 1926. During his early printmaking career (1926–1932), Geerlings created fewer than sixty prints.

In a short period, Geerlings became known for his detailed intaglio prints, aquatints, and etchings depicting early twentieth-century urban American architecture. His work frequently focused on the skylines of New York City and Chicago. These cityscapesbecome among his best-known works.

In these early works, Geerlings captured the nation's booming urban metropolises and their architectural transformation. With names like Colossus, The Vertical Mile, and Olympus, Gerald's etchings captured the zeitgeist of urban pre-war America. Gerald's depictions of urban constructions were a testament to this period's collective optimism, society's belief in human progress, and the nation's confidence in boundless growth and opportunities.

Geerlings' works were well received by critics and peers, resulting in numerous awards and exhibitions. In 1931, Geerlings won his first award for a print from the Pennsylvania Academy of the Fine Arts for his print Jeweled City. In 1933, Geerlings was awarded the First Prize for "Best Etching" for his work Grand Canal, America at the Century of Progress Chicago World's Fair exhibition. Geerlings's prints were also prominently exhibited at the 1939 New York World's Fair.

==== Later work ====
Despite the critical acclaim received for his early prints, the economic conditions of the Great Depression forced Geerlings to temporarily abandon printmaking. He spent the next four decades exploring commercial opportunities through his architectural practice and authoring additional books on metalworking and wrought iron.

In the 1970s, Geerlings resumed printmaking. In these later years of his career, Geerlings experimented with a variety of mediums in his artworks, including colored pencils, pastels, watercolors, and "new type[s] of lithographic pencil and aluminum plate, that produce[d] the effect of a soft-ground etching." This was a departure from his early signature monochromatic aquatint, ink, and graphite works.

He produced a "highly praised" collection of drawings and lithographs of Paris, which were published in the volume, Paris Along the Seine. Geerlings also created a collection of architectural drawings as a homage to New York's Bicentennial celebrations.

In 1980, Geerlings donated much of his work to the University of Pennsylvania Architectural Archives. After a printmaking career spanning decades, many of his works entered the permanent collections of museums around the world.

The catalogue raisonné of his prints, Gerald K. Geerlings, was published in 1984 by Joseph S. Czestochowski of the Cedar Rapids Art Association.

== Published books ==
- Color Schemes of Adam Ceilings (1928)
- Wrought Iron in Architecture: Wrought iron craftsmanship; historical notes and illustrations of wrought iron in Italy, Spain, France, Holland, fixtures and knockers; Specifications (1st Edition) (1929)
- Metal Crafts in Architecture: Bronze, Brass, Cast Iron, Copper, Lead, Lighting Fixtures, Tin, Specifications (1st Edition) (1929)
- Wrought Iron in Architecture: Wrought iron craftsmanship; historical notes and illustrations of wrought iron in Italy, Spain, France, Holland, fixtures and knockers; Specifications (Reprint) (1957)
- Metal Crafts in Architecture; Bronze, Brass, Cast Iron, Copper, Lead, Lighting Fixtures, Tin, Specifications (2nd Edition) (1957)
- Wrought Iron in Architecture (1972)
- Wrought Iron in Architecture: An Illustrated Survey (1984)
- Gerald K. Geerlings (1984)
- Paris Along the Seine (1987)

== Museum collections ==
Today, Geerlings' works can be found in the permanent collections of many museums, including:

- The Whitney Museum of American Art
- The British Museum
- Smithsonian American Art Museum
- The Metropolitan Museum of Art
- The National Gallery of Art
- The New York Historical Society Museum & Library
- The Art Institute of Chicago
- The Victoria and Albert Museum
- The Philadelphia Museum of Art
- The Delaware Museum of Art
- The Brooklyn Museum
- The Carter Museum of American Art
- The Gibbes Museum
- The Mattatuck Museum
- The Princeton University Art Museum
- The Davis Museum at Wellesley College
- Grinnell College Museum of Art
- Crystal Bridges Museum of American Art
- Indianapolis Museum of Art
- Mildred Lane Kemper Art Museum
