= 105th Cavalry Regiment =

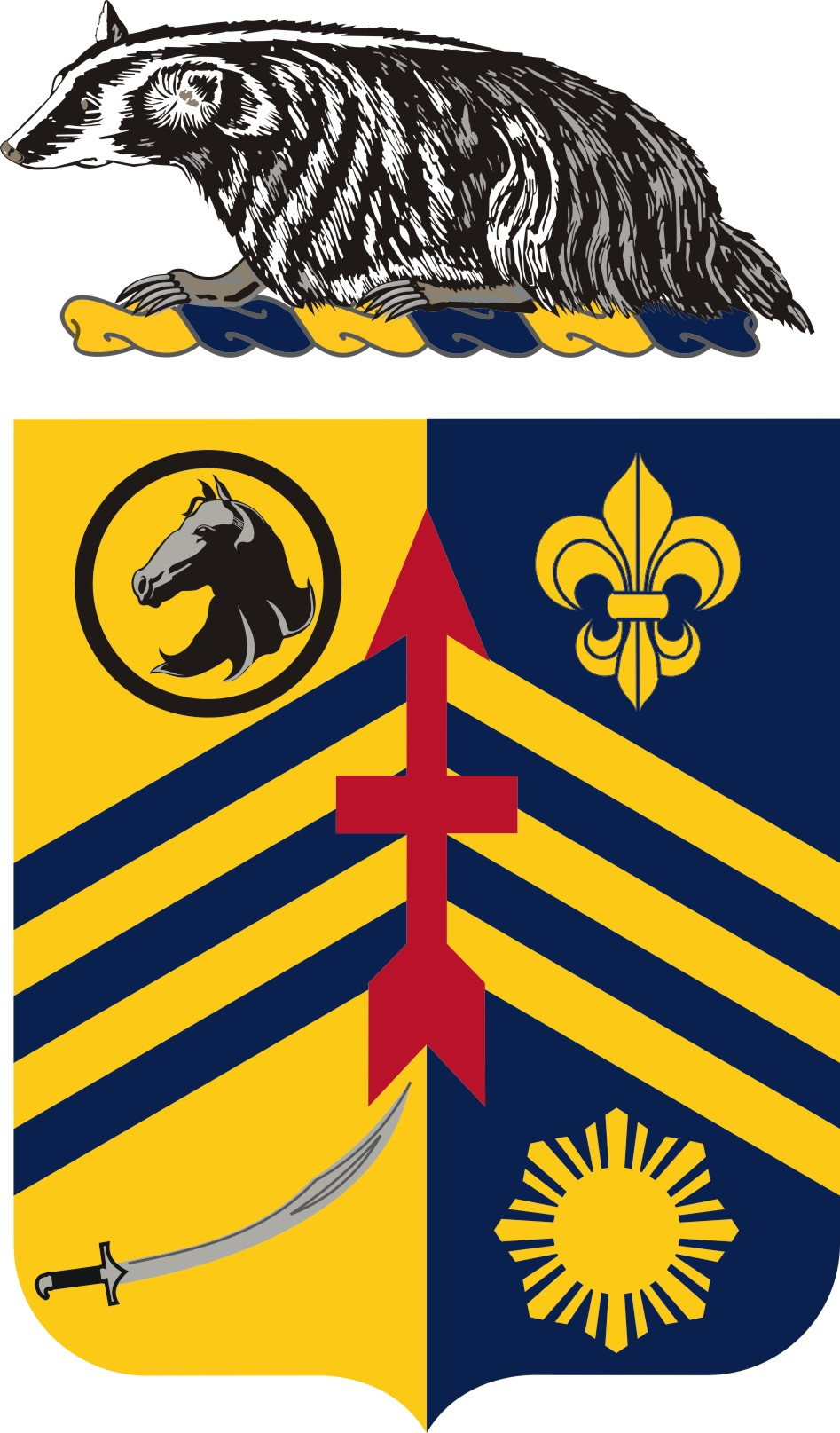
- coat of arms
- Active: various
- Country: United States
- Branch: Wisconsin Army National Guard
- Size: Regiment

The 105th Cavalry Regiment is a regiment in the United States Army National Guard.

A regiment with this designation has been formed three times, and due to the lineage system of the United States Army, all three formations are considered completely separate units. The first formation later became the 126th Field Artillery Regiment. The second was initially formed as the 132nd Tank Battalion.

== Lineage 1 ==
- MOTTO; FOLLOW ME

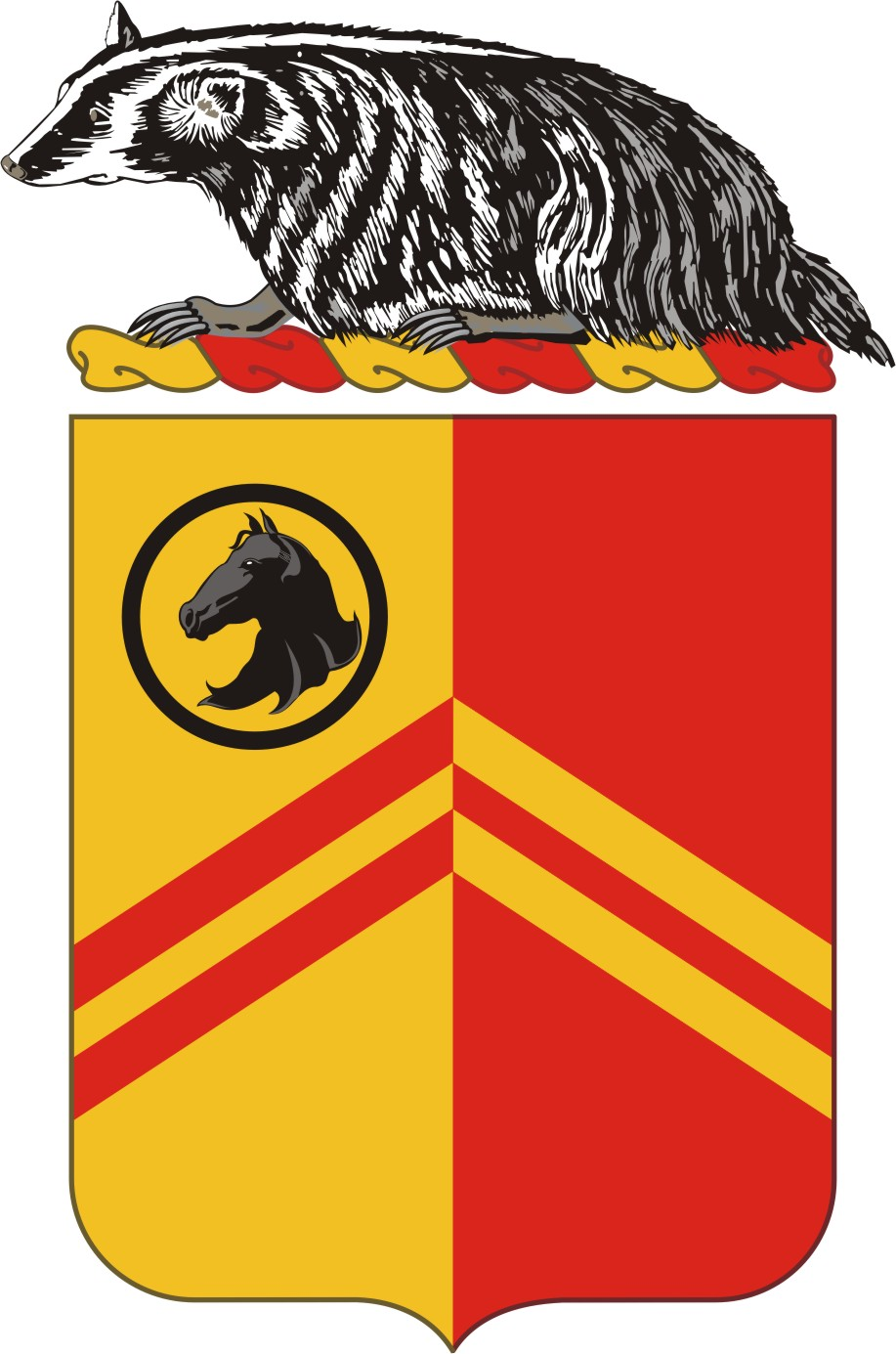
see 126th Field Artillery Regiment (United States)

== Lineage 2 ==
- MOTTO; OUT IN FRONT

Constituted 3 December 1941 in the regular army as the 632nd Tank Destroyer Battalion. Activated 15 December 1941 at Camp Livingston, La. with Wisconsin National Guard personnel from the 32nd Infantry Division. Inactivated 1 January 1946 at Camp Stoneman, Ca. Redesignated 132nd Heavy Tank Battalion, and allotted to the Wisconsin National Guard and assigned to the 32nd Division 1 February 1949. Organized and Federally recognized 15 November 1949 with headquarters at Merrill. Reorganized and redesignated 1 February 1953 as the 132nd Tank Battalion (90mm). Relieved from the 32nd Infantry Division, Reorganized and redesignated 15 February 1959 as the 105th Armor, a parent regiment under the Combat Arms Regimental system.

Constituted in the Wisconsin Army National guard as 2nd Reconnaissance Squadron, 105th Armor, a parent Regiment under the Combat Arms Regimental System, assigned to the 32nd Infantry Division and organized 15 February 1959 from existing units with headquarters at Sparta. Ordered into active Federal service 15 October 1961 at Sparta; released from active Federal service and reverted to state control 10 August 1962.

Reorganized and redesignated 1 April 1963 as the 105th Cavalry, a parent Regiment under the Combat Arms Regimental System, to consist of the 1st Squadron, an element of the 32nd Infantry Division with headquarters in Sparta. Reorganized 30 December 1967 to consist of Troop E, an element of the 32nd Infantry Brigade at Baraboo. Troop E was reorganized from Troop B of the 1st Squadron, 105th Cavalry. Withdrawn 1 June 1989 from the Combat Arms Regimental System and reorganized under the United States Army Regimental System.

Troop E, 105th Cavalry and its Detachment 1 at Reedsburg were inactivated in 1996 when the 32nd lost its separate status and became a brigade of the 34th Infantry Division. As the division already had an armored cavalry squadron, the troop was without a place in the new structure. The Baraboo unit became Company C of the 173rd Engineer Battalion, and the Reedsburg unit became Detachment 1 of the Headquarters Company of the 1st Battalion, 128th Infantry.

== Lineage 3 ==
A new 105th Cavalry was constituted in the Wisconsin Army National Guard as a parent regiment on 1 September 2002 after the 32nd became a separate brigade once more. Troop E, 105th Cavalry was organized at Merrill with Detachment 1 at Antigo, serving as the 32nd Infantry Brigade reconnaissance troop. The Merrill and Antigo units had previously been Companies B and A, respectively, of the eliminated 1st Battalion, 632nd Armor. The 105th Cavalry was redesignated as the 105th Cavalry Regiment on 1 October 2005 when the army reintroduced the designation regiment to unit names. Troop E, 105th Cavalry was ordered into active Federal service on 1 June 2007 for a deployment to Iraq and returned to state control on 4 July 2008 when it was released from active duty.

Meanwhile, the 1st Squadron, 105th Cavalry was organized from 2nd Battalion, 128th Infantry with headquarters at Madison on 1 September 2007 during the restructuring of the Wisconsin Army National Guard in response to army modularization. The 1st Squadron, 105th Cavalry Regiment became the brigade reconnaissance, surveillance, and target acquisition (RSTA) squadron of the 32nd Infantry Brigade Combat Team. The restructuring resulted in the conversion of Troop E to a support role as part of the 32nd Brigade Special Troops Battalion: the Merrill unit became Detachment 1 of the battalion headquarters company and the Antigo unit Company C (Signal). Since 2007, the squadron has included headquarters troop at Madison, Troop A at Fort Atkinson, Troop B at Watertown, and Troop C at Reedsburg.

The squadron was ordered into active Federal service on 1 February 2009 for a deployment to Iraq and returned to state control on 7 March 2010 when it was released from active duty.

=== Campaign participation credit ===
Headquarters Troop, 1st Squadron (Madison), additionally entitled to:

- Southwest Asia
- Liberation and Defense of Kuwait
- Cease-Fire
- War on Terrorism
- Global War on Terrorism

Troop A, 1st Squadron (Fort Atkinson), additionally entitled to:

- World War II
- Papua
- New Guinea
- Leyte
- Luzon
- War on Terrorism
- Global War on Terrorism

Troop B, 1st Squadron (Watertown), additionally entitled to:

- World War II
- Papua
- New Guinea
- Leyte
- Luzon
- War on Terrorism
- Global War on Terrorism

Troop C, 1st Squadron (Reedsburg), additionally entitled to:

- World War I
- Aisne-Marne
- Oise-Aisne
- Meuse-Argonne
- Alsace 1918
- Champagne 1918
- World War II
- Papua
- New Guinea
- Leyte
- Luzon
- War on Terrorism
- Global War on Terrorism

=== Decorations ===
Headquarters Troop, 1st Squadron (Madison), additionally entitled to:

- Valorous Unit Award, Streamer embroidered IRAQ 2003–2004

Troop A, 1st Squadron (Fort Atkinson) additionally entitled to:

- Presidential Unit Citation (Army), Streamer embroidered PAPUA
- Presidential Unit Citation (Army), Streamer embroidered LUZON
- Meritorious Unit Commendation (Army), Streamer embroidered PACIFIC THEATER
- Philippine Presidential Unit Citation, Streamer embroidered 17 OCTOBER 1944 TO 4 JULY 1945

Troop B, 1st Squadron (Watertown), additionally entitled to:

- Presidential Unit Citation (Army), Streamer embroidered LEYTE

Troop C, 1st Squadron (Reedsburg), additionally entitled to:

- Presidential Unit Citation, Streamer embroidered PAPUA
- French Croix de Guerre with Palm, World War I, Streamer embroidered OISE-AISNE
- Philippine Presidential Unit Citation, Streamer embroidered 17 OCTOBER 1944 TO 4 JULY 1945

== Distinctive unit insignia ==
- Description

A Gold color metal and enamel device 1 1/8 inches (2.9 cm) in height overall consisting of a shield blazoned: Per pale Or and Azure three chevronels counterchanged of the field, in dexter chief a horse’s head erased within an annulet Sable, a fleur-de-lis in sinister chief of the first detailed of the second, in sinister base a Philippine sun symbol of the first and a scimitar in dexter base bendwise sinister point to nombril of the third, in pale an arrow point up passing through a humet Gules. Attached below a Blue scroll inscribed "SEMPER PORRO" in Gold.

- Symbolism

Gold or yellow is the primary branch color for Cavalry signifying the four virtues of nobleness, goodwill, vigor and magnanimity. It represents the sun, fire, Sunday, honor, majesty, royalty, riches and wisdom. Dark blue is the primary branch color of Infantry signifying renown and beauty, the sapphire, Venus, air, Friday, calm seas, charity, cold, constancy, devotion, justice, loyalty, piety, sincerity, the sky, thinking and truth. The chevronels represent the three most recent overseas conflicts the unit served in (World War I, World War II and the Iraq War). The horse’s head within the annulet is from the Light Horse Squadron, First Wisconsin Cavalry organized in Milwaukee in 1880. The fleur-de-lis signifies World War I combat operations in France. The Philippine sun represents World War II combat operations in the Pacific. The scimitar symbolizes participation in the Iraq War. The red arrow is taken from the insignia of the 32d Infantry Brigade Combat Team. Red signifies valiance and represents a ruby, fire, Saturday, blood of life, boldness, Christ, courage, hardiness, liberty, passion, patriotism, the planet Mars, sentiment, strength, valor, warmth and zeal. The shield is taken from the shield of the Wisconsin State seal. The motto translates to "Ever Forward or Always Forward."

- Background

The distinctive unit insignia was approved on 21 April 2011.

== Coat of arms ==
=== Blazon ===
- Shield

Per pale Or and Azure three chevronels counterchanged of the field, in dexter chief a horse’s head erased Sable detailed Silver Gray within an annulet of the third, a fleur-de-lis in sinister chief of the first detailed of the second, in sinister base a Philippine sun symbol of the first, a scimitar in dexter base bendwise sinister point to nombril Proper, in pale an arrow point up passing through a humet Gules. Crest That for the regiments and separate battalions of the Wisconsin Army National Guard: From a wreath Or and Azure, a badger couchant Proper.

- Motto SEMPER PORRO (Ever Forward or Always Forward).

=== Symbolism ===
- Shield

Yellow is the primary branch color for cavalry and blue is the primary branch color for infantry. Yellow represents honor and wisdom while blue is representative of constancy, loyalty, and truth; all attributes of those who serve in the regiment. The chevronels represent the three most recent overseas conflicts the unit served in (World War I, World War II and the Iraq War). The horse’s head within the annulet is from the Light Horse Squadron, First Wisconsin Cavalry organized in Milwaukee in 1880. The fleur-de-lis signifies World War I combat operations in France. The Philippine sun represents World War II combat operations in the Pacific. The scimitar symbolizes participation in the Iraq War. The red arrow is taken from the insignia of the 32d Infantry Brigade Combat Team. Red signifies courage, strength, and valor.

- Crest

The crest is that of the Wisconsin Army National Guard.

=== Background ===
The coat of arms was approved on 21 April 2011.
