= 126th Field Artillery Regiment =

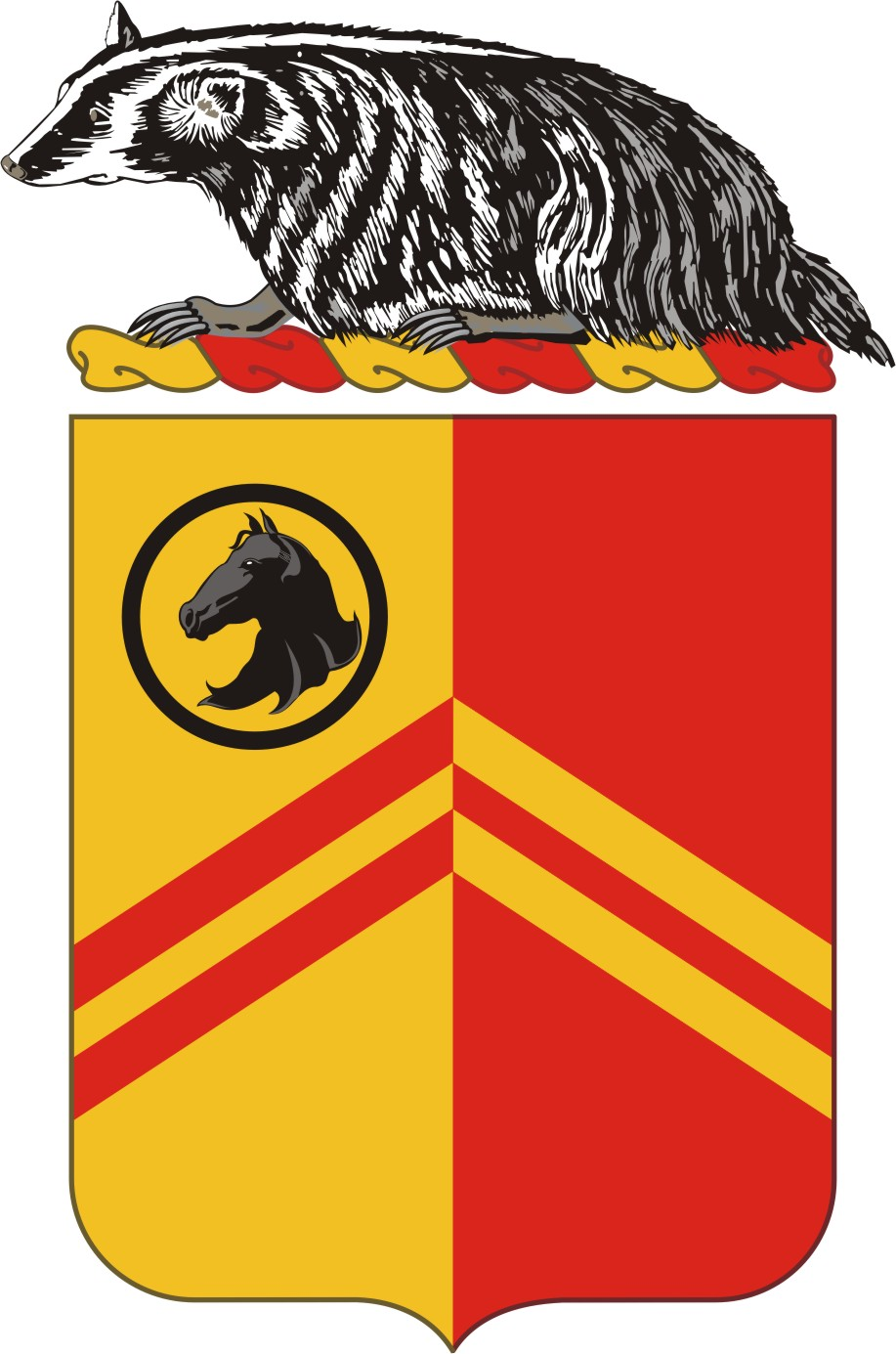
- Coat of arms
- Active: 1880
- Country: United States
- Branch: Wisconsin Army National Guard
- Size: Regiment
- Motto: "Follow Me"

The 126th Field Artillery Regiment was a regiment in the United States Army National Guard.

== Lineage ==
Constituted in the National Guard of Wisconsin as the 1st Cavalry and partially organized by redesignation of Light Horse Squadron of Milwaukee as Troop A (constituted 25 March 1880 as Light Horse Squadron and organized 26 April 1880 at Milwaukee). Troop B organized 24 June 1916 at Milwaukee; remainder of regiment organized April–July 1917 at locations as follows-

- Headquarters and Headquarters Troop, Supply Troop, and Troops C. and D. at Milwaukee.
- Troop E. at Kenosha
- Troop F. at Lake Geneva
- Troop G. at Grand Rapids
- Troop H. at Merrill
- Troop I. at Stevens Point
- Troop K. at Lady Smith
- Troop L. at Eau Claire
- Troop M. at Sheboygan

Mustered into federal service 31 July 1917; drafted on 5 August 1917. reorganized and redesignated 120th Field Artillery and assigned to the 32nd Infantry Division (United States)28 September 1917. Demobilized 16 May 1919 at Camp Grant, Il.

Former 1st Cavalry reconstituted in the Wisconsin National Guard and partially organized between October 1919 and March 1921 with Troops A, and B at Milwaukee; Troop E at Kenosha, Troop G at Watertown, Troop H at Fort Atkinson; and Troop L at Eau Claire.

- Redesignated 1 April 1921 as the 105th Cavalry, assigned to the 23rd Cavalry Division (United States) and Reorganized as a two squadron regiment with elements at the following locations-
- Headquarters and Headquarters troop organized at Milwaukee and federally recognized 24 May 1921
- Company L. 1st Cavalry at Eau Claire, redesignated service Troop
- Headquarters 1st Squadron organized at Milwaukee and federally recognized 1 April 1921
- Troop A, 1st Cavalry at Milwaukee, redesignated Troop A (light horse Squadron)
- Troop B, 1st Cavalry at Milwaukee, redesignated Troop B
- Troop C, organized and federally recognized at Two Rivers in 1921 (federal recognition withdrawn 1 July 1923)
- Headquarters, 2nd Squadron, organized at Darlington and federally recognized 1 June 1921 (relocated to Milwaukee in 1926)
- Troop G 1st Cavalry, at Watertown, redesignated Troop D.
- Troop E 1st Cavalry, at Kenosha, redesignated Troop E.
- Troop H 1st Cavalry, at Fort Atkinson redesignated Troop F.

Reorganized 1 April 1929 as a three squadron regiment with elements activated or redesignated as follows-

- 1st Squadron with headquarters at Milwaukee reorganized to consist of Troop A (light Horse Squadron) and B at Milwaukee
- 2nd Squadron with headquarters at Milwaukee reorganized to consist of Troop E at Kenosha and Troop F at Milwaukee (Headquarters, 2nd Squadron, relocated to Kenosha in 1930 and to Wauwatosa in 1934)
- Headquarters 3rd squadron, organized at Watertown and federally recognized 28 May 1929 with Troop I at Fort Atkinson and Troop K at Watertown. Service Troop at Eau Claire redesignated Machine Gun Troop.

Relieved from the 23rd Cavalry Division converted and redesignated as the 126th Field Artillery, 1 October 1940.

== History ==
Following conversion from the 105th Cavalry Regiment, the 126th FA Regiment was subordinated to the 32nd Infantry Division. The regiment was initially equipped with 75-mm field guns. The 126th FA Regiment, less its second battalion, was redesignated the 126th Field Artillery Battalion on 31 January 1942. The regiment's second battalion had been redesignated as the 1st Battalion, 173rd FA Regiment on 16 January 1942. The 126th FA Battalion was reequipped with 105-mm howitzers during World War II and saw service in Australia, Goodenough Island, New Guinea, and the Philippines with the 32nd Division. On 28 February 1946, the 126th FA Battalion was inactivated in Japan.

The 126th FA Battalion was reorganized on 23 June 1947 as part of the Wisconsin Army National Guard. Consolidation with the 132nd Anti-Aircraft Battalion in 1959 resulted in the reemergence of the 126th FA Regiment, with one missile battalion and one field artillery battalion. The FA battalion was called to active duty for ten months during 1961–1962. A further reorganization on 5 November 1963 designated the regiment's second battalion as the 1st Battalion, 126th Field Artillery. The missile battalion became a battery and was later relieved of assignment to the regiment in 1971. After riot control duty in Milwaukee in July 1967, the 1-126 FA Battalion was released from assignment to the 32nd Division in December of the same year. The reorganization of 1 July 1971 reduced the regiment to a single battalion and, on 1 May 1972, redesignated the regiment as the 126th Field Artillery. Subsequent assignments for the battalion were to the 257th FA Group and finally to the 57th FA Brigade. In 2007, the 1st Battalion, 126th Field Artillery was converted to the 257th Brigade Support Battalion, which inherited the regimental lineage.

== Distinctive unit insignia ==
- Description

A Silver color metal and enamel device 1 3/64 inches (2.7 cm) in height overall consisting of a shield blazoned: Per pale Or and Gules, two chevronels counterchanged in dexter chief a horse's head Sable, eyed of the first within an annulet of the third. Attached above on a wreath Or and Gules a badger couchant Proper. Attached below and to the sides of the shield a Gold scroll inscribed “FOLLOW ME” in Black letters.

- Symbolism

Yellow (Or) for the Cavalry service, is impaled with the scarlet for the Regiment's conversion into Field Artillery during World War I. The two chevronels represent the two chevrons of a year's overseas service. The ringed horse's head device is that of the Light Horse Squadron, organized in Milwaukee in 1880, in which the regiment had its origin. The motto “Follow me” is the keynote of modern cavalry tactics.

- Background

The distinctive unit insignia was originally approved for the 126th Field Artillery Regiment on 7 June 1973. It was redesignated effective 1 September 2008, for the 257th Support Battalion.

== Coat of arms ==
=== Blazon ===
- Shield

Per pale Or and Gules, two chevronels counterchanged in dexter chief a horse's head erased with an annulet Sable.

- Crest

That for the regiments and separate battalions of the Wisconsin Army National Guard: On a wreath of the colors Or and Gules, a badger couchant Proper. Motto FOLLOW ME.

- Symbolism
- Shield

Yellow (Or) for the Cavalry service, is impaled with the scarlet for the Regiment's conversion into Field Artillery during World War I. The two chevronels represent the two chevrons of a year's overseas service. The ringed horse's head device is that of the Light Horse Squadron, organized in Milwaukee in 1880, in which the regiment had its origin. The motto “Follow Me” is the keynote of modern Cavalry tactics.

- Crest

The crest is that of the Wisconsin Army National Guard.

- Background

The coat of arms was originally approved for the 105th Cavalry Regiment (1st Wisconsin National Guard) on 30 January 1923. It was redesignated for the 126th Field Artillery Battalion on 19 May 1942. It was redesignated for the 126th Artillery Regiment on 30 December 1963. The insignia was redesignated for the 126th Field Artillery Regiment on 27 September 1972. It was redesignated effective 1 September 2008, for the 257th Support Battalion. It was amended to correct the crest symbolism on 28 March 2011.

== Distinctive trimming ==
A twisted silk cord, 1/4 inch in Diameter, or scarlet and gold strands, worn in a single snug loop around the left sleeve-band, passing under the shoulder loop of the service coat.

== See also ==
- United States Army branch insignia
