= 632nd Armor Regiment =

632nd Armor
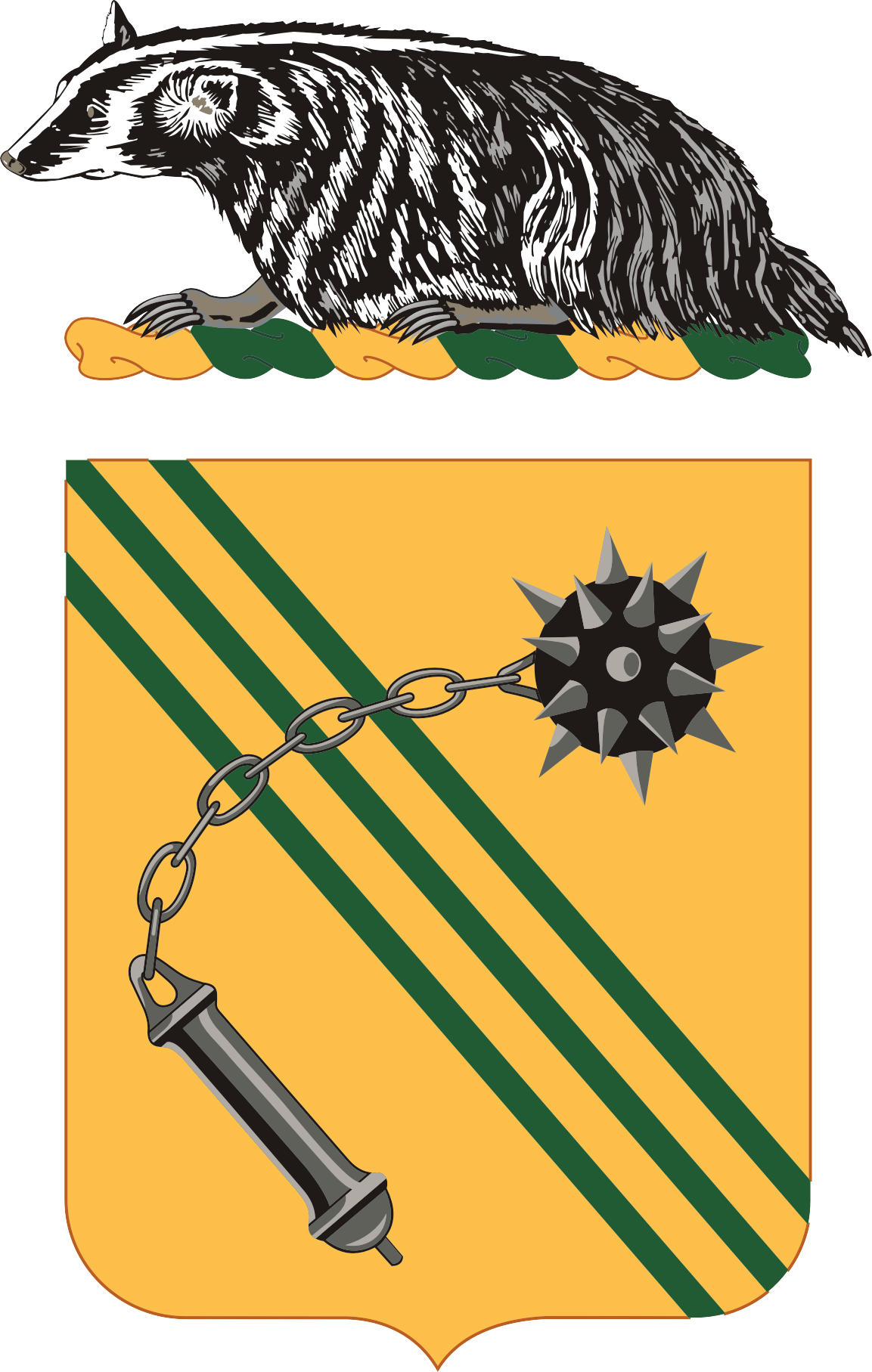
- Coat of Arms
- Active: 1963 – 2001
- Country: United States
- Branch: United States Army
- Type: Armor
- Motto(s): Age Aut Perfice (Act or Achieve)

The 632nd Armor was an armored regiment of the Wisconsin Army National Guard from 1963 until 2001. A parent regiment under the Combat Arms Regimental System and U.S. Army Regimental System, the 632nd Armor was represented in the Wisconsin Army National Guard by the 1st and 2nd Battalions between 1963 and 1967. The 2nd Battalion was eliminated in a 1967 reorganization, while the 1st Battalion continued in existence until 2001.

== Traditions ==
The 632nd Armor Regiment traced its lineage back to the 632nd Tank Destroyer Battalion that saw service in World War II as well as the 132nd Tank Battalion and 105th Armor Regiment of the Wisconsin National Guard.

== History ==
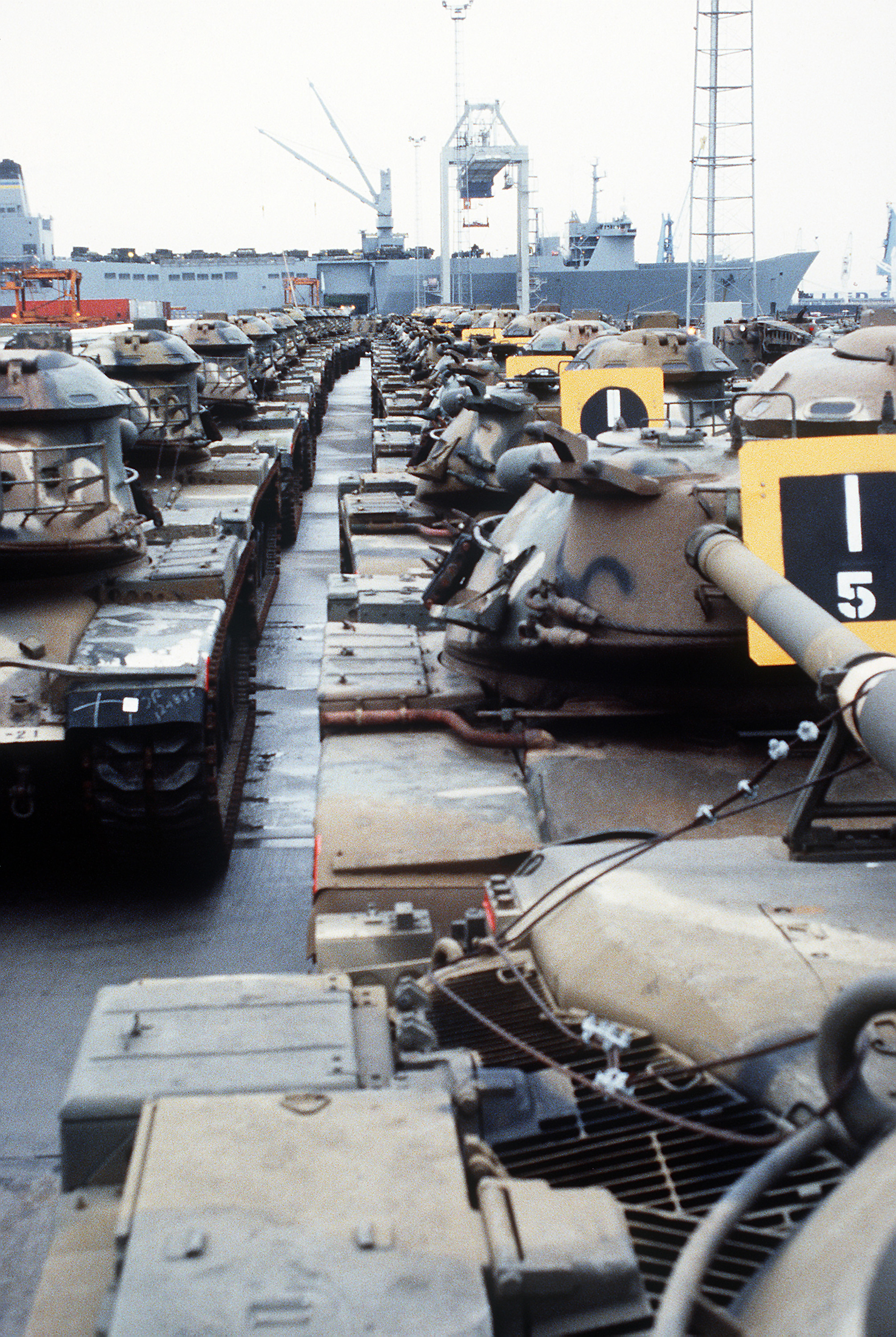
M60A3 Patton main battle tanks are lined up in the staging area at the Dundalk Marine Terminal after being offloaded from the vehicle cargo/rapid response ship USNS Antares (T-AKR-294). The tanks were used by the 32nd Separate Infantry Brigade (Mechanized), Wisconsin Army National Guard, during Exercise REFORGER '86.

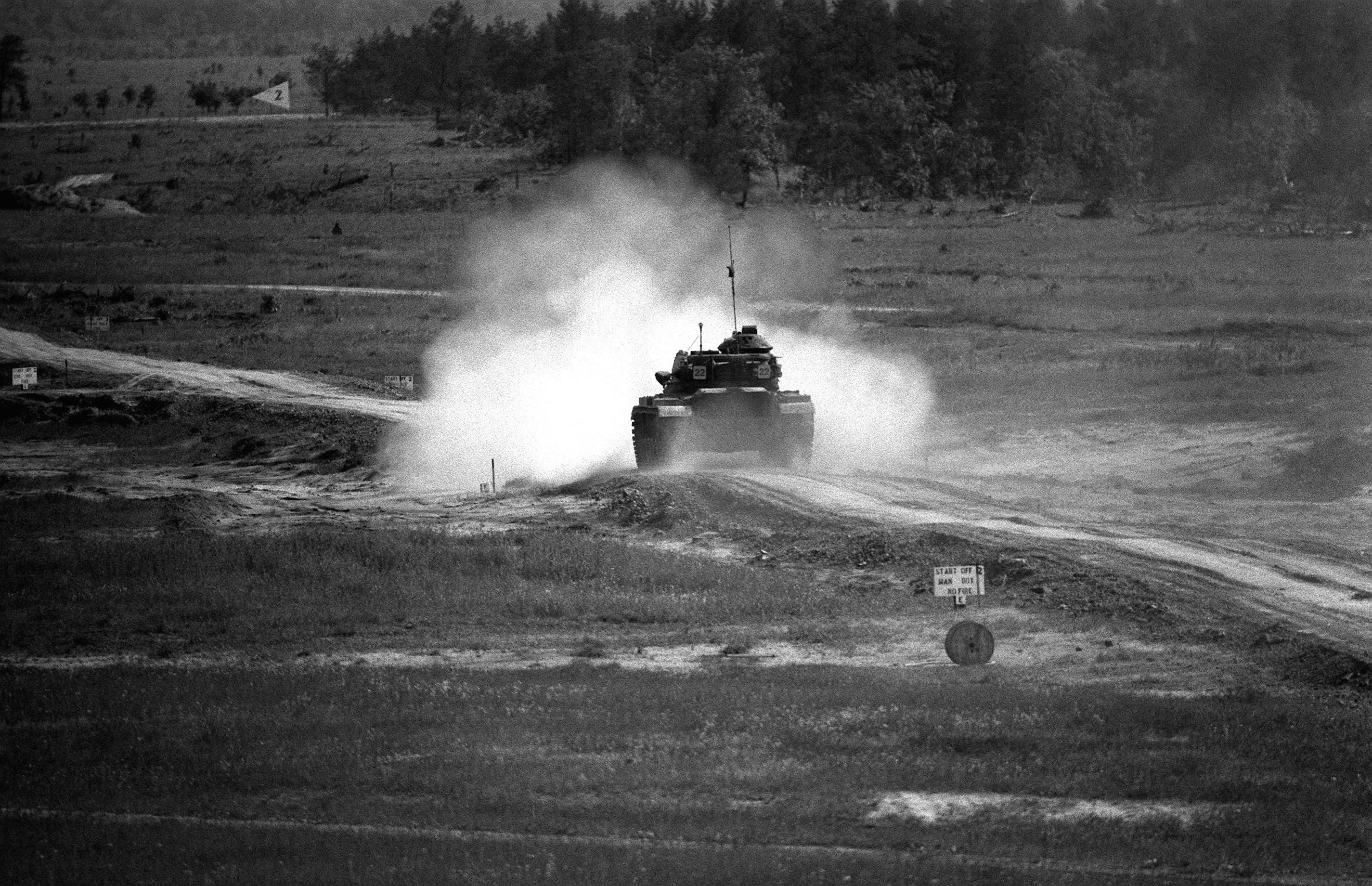
An M60A3 Patton of the 1-632 Armor firing on a tank range at Fort McCoy, 1990

On 1 April 1963, the regiment was created on the basis of elements of the 105th Armor Regiment. The regiment was initially represented by the 1st and 2nd Battalions, but the 30 December 1967 reorganization of the National Guard eliminated the 2nd Battalion. The Green Bay-based Headquarters and Headquarters Company and Companies A and C of the 2nd Battalion were consolidated into the headquarters and headquarters company of the 1st Battalion, 127th Infantry. Company B at Sparta was consolidated into the new 105th Light Equipment Maintenance Company together with headquarters and headquarters troop of the 1st Squadron, 105th Cavalry and Troop C of the same squadron. The same reorganization also eliminated the 32nd Infantry Division, and the 1st Battalion, 632nd Armor became a nondivisional unit under the control of the 264th Armor Group headquarters. Changes in the 1st Battalion were the conversion of Company B, 3rd Battalion, 127th Infantry at Antigo to Company B of the 1-632 Armor and Battery A, 1st Battalion, 120th Artillery at Mosinee to Company C of the 1-632 Armor. The battalion headquarters and headquarters company remained at Wausau and Company A remained at Merrill. On 1 April 1971 the battalion was realigned under the 32nd Infantry Brigade, the successor to the 32nd Infantry Division, when the brigade converted from infantry to mechanized infantry. At the same time, the battalion headquarters company was split into a headquarters company and a support company.

The M48-equipped battalion, more than 500-strong, was sent to West Germany with the brigade in January 1986 for three weeks to participate in Exercise Reforger '86. The battalion received the first of 58 M60A3 tanks in February 1987. In late 2001, the 1st Battalion, 632nd Armor was inactivated as a result of the reorganization of the 32nd Infantry Brigade from mechanized to light infantry. Its 58 M1P Abrams tanks were shipped out of Wisconsin. Headquarters and Headquarters Company at Wausau became Detachment 1 of the Headquarters and Headquarters Company, 32nd Infantry Brigade, Company A at Merrill became Troop E, 105th Cavalry, Company B at Antigo became Detachment 1 of Troop E, 105th Cavalry, Company C at Marinette became Company D, 2nd Battalion, 127th Infantry and Company D at Mosinee became Detachment 1, Headquarters and Service Battery, 1st Battalion, 120th Field Artillery.

== Sources ==
- Mary L. Stubbs and Stanley R. Connor, Army Lineage Series Armor-Cavalry Part II: Army National Guard, Washington D.C.: GPO, 1972.
