= 32nd Infantry Brigade Combat Team =

- Shoulder sleeve insignia
- Active: 30 December 1967 - present
- Country: United States
- Allegiance: Wisconsin Army National Guard
- Branch: United States Army National Guard
- Type: Light Infantry
- Role: 38th Infantry Division (United States)
- Size: Brigade Combat Team
- Garrison/HQ: Camp Williams, Wisconsin
- Nicknames: "Red Arrow" (Special Designation) "Les Terribles" (as World War I division)
- Motto: "Forward"
- Engagements: Operation Iraqi Freedom

Insignia
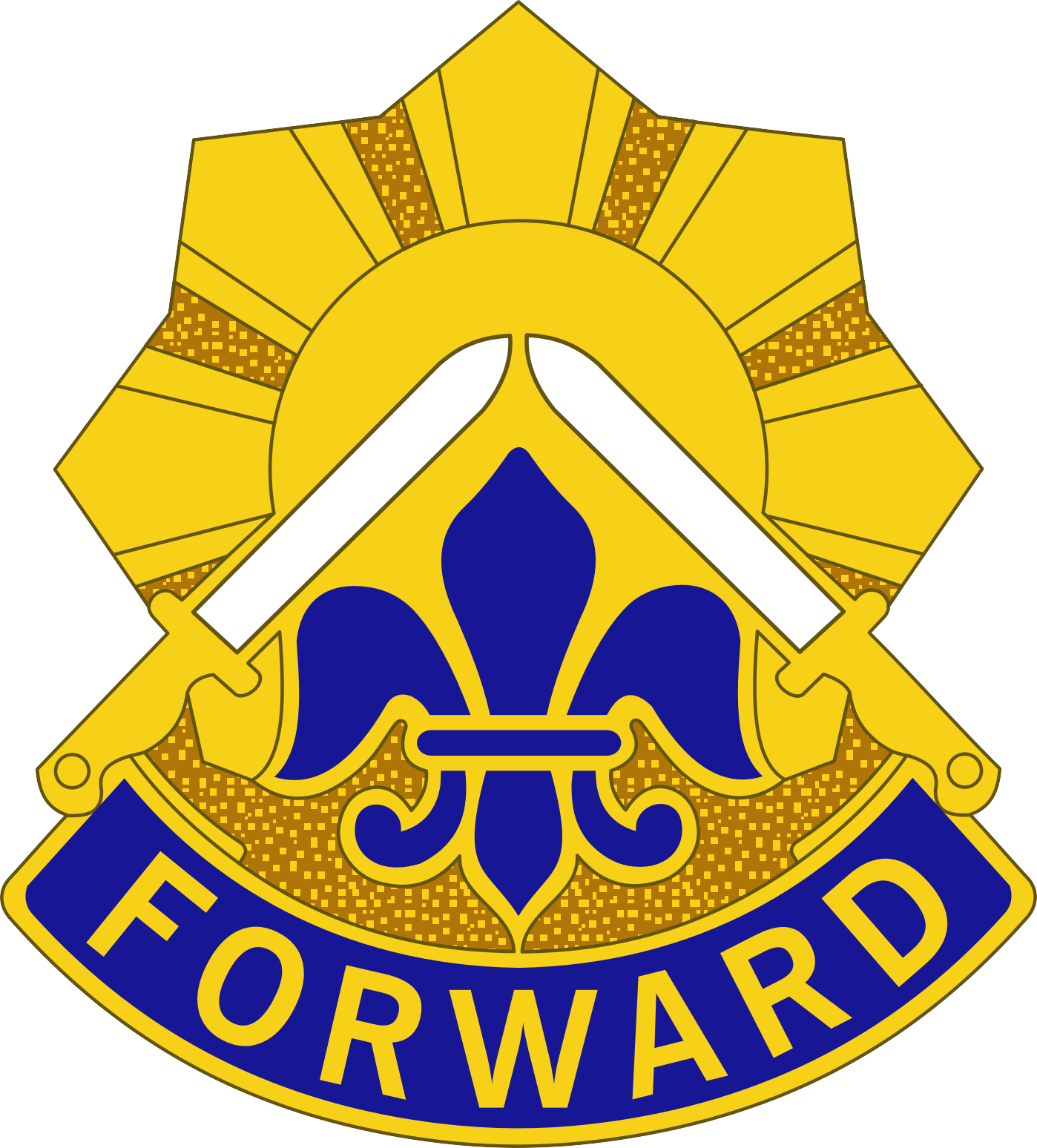
- Distinctive unit insignia

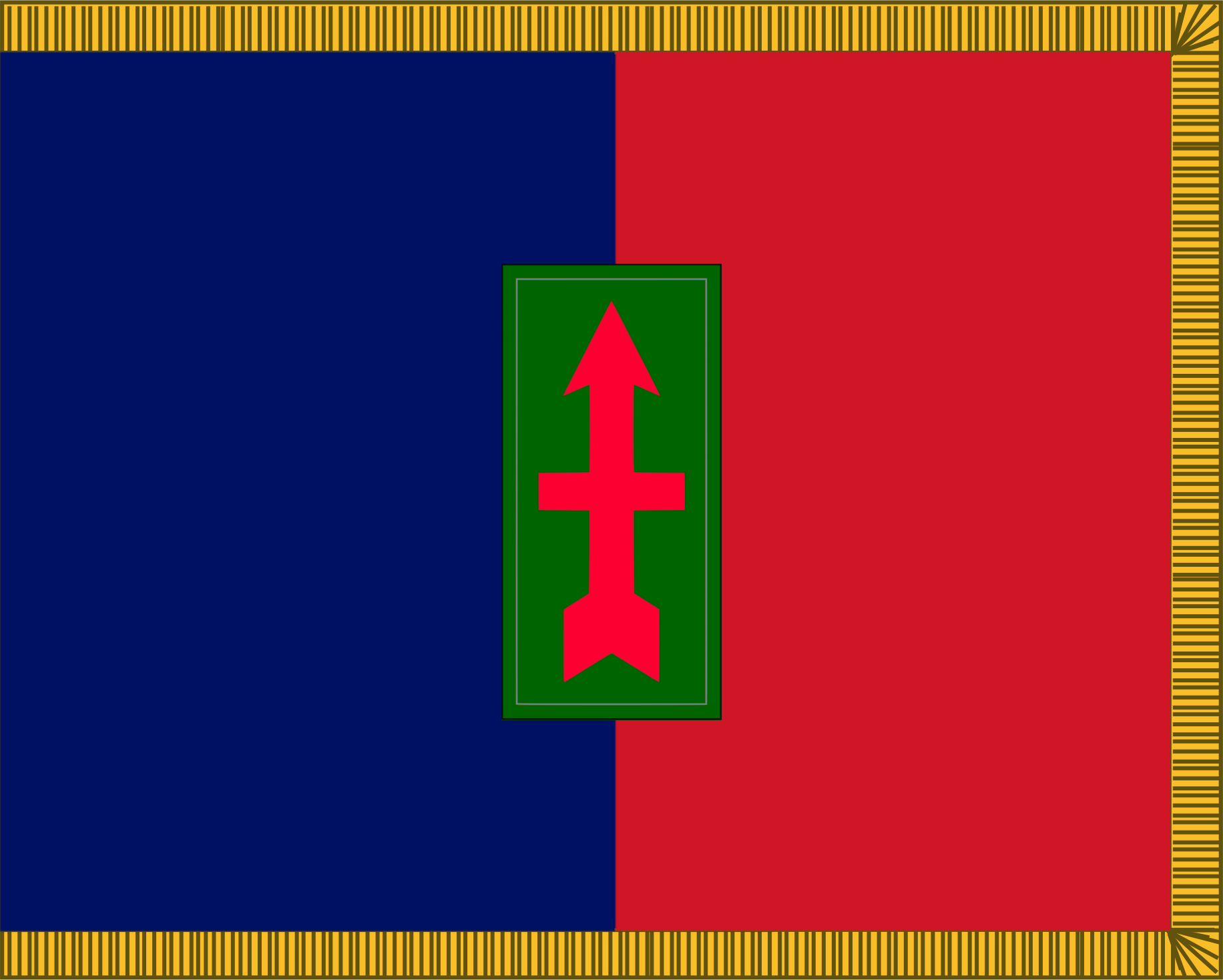
- 32nd Infantry Brigade Flag

The 32nd Infantry Brigade Combat Team ("Red Arrow") is an infantry brigade combat team (IBCT) in the United States Army National Guard. It was formed from the inactivated 32nd Infantry Division in 1967. It is the largest unit in the Wisconsin Army National Guard.

== History ==
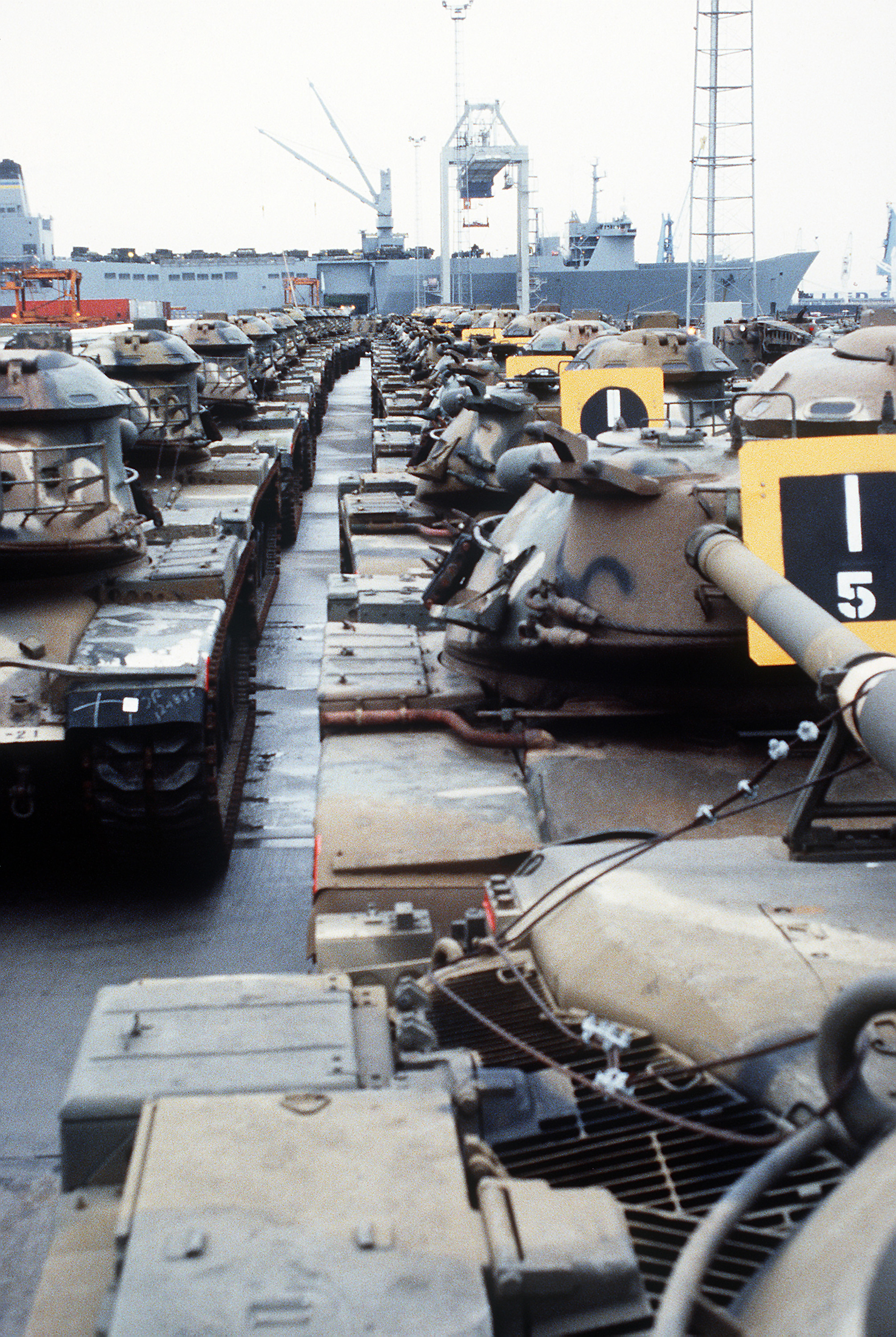
M-60A1/A3 Patton main battle tanks are lined up in the staging area at the Dundalk Marine Terminal, Port of Baltimore, after being offloaded from the vehicle cargo/rapid response ship USNS Antares (T-AKR-294). The tanks were used by the 32nd Infantry Brigade (Mechanized) (Separate), Wisconsin Army National Guard, during Exercise REFORGER '86.

Formed in 1967 from the inactivated 32nd Infantry Division, the Red Arrow Brigade consisted of three battalions of light infantry as well as support and engineer units. The 32nd's shoulder patch, a line shot through with a red arrow, originated in the division's tenacity in piercing German lines during World War I that no other army could breach. It then became known as the Red Arrow Division. After 1967 the brigade was a separate brigade of the Wisconsin Army National Guard, not part of any larger infantry division.

In April 1971, the brigade was converted to a mechanized brigade and became the 32nd "Red Arrow" Infantry Brigade (Separate) (Mechanized). In 1984–85 the brigade included 2–127 Infantry (Mech); 1–128 Infantry (Mech); 1st Battalion, 632nd Armor Regiment; 1–120 Field Artillery; Troop E, 105th Cavalry; and the 32nd Engineer Company. In January 1986 the 32nd Brigade participated in REFORGER '86. The entire brigade deployed from Wisconsin, with all of its equipment, to Germany.

In October 1996, the brigade lost its separate status and became a divisional brigade, assigned to the 34th "Red Bull" Infantry Division. The 34th Division had its headquarters in Minnesota.

On 1 October 2001, the brigade was reorganized as the 32nd Infantry Brigade (Separate) (Light). This resulted in the 32nd Brigade becoming a separate formation once again, no longer attached to the 34th ID. On 23 January 2003 about 100 soldiers from various 32nd "Red Arrow" Infantry Brigade units reported for active duty for service as Task Force Red Arrow in support of Operation Noble Eagle. Task Force Red Arrow supplemented security for two years at three of Wisconsin's airbases, the 440th Airlift Wing in Milwaukee, the 128th Air Refueling Wing in Milwaukee, and the 115th Fighter Wing in Madison.

The brigade was reorganized again in September 2007 as the 32nd Infantry Brigade Combat Team. With this change the 2nd Battalion, 128th Infantry Regiment was reorganized as a cavalry reconnaissance, surveillance, and target acquisition unit, known as the 1st Squadron, 105th Cavalry Regiment.

== Units 2015 ==
32nd Infantry Brigade Combat Team (32nd IBCT) consisted of the following elements in 2015:

- Headquarters and Headquarters Company (HHC) 32nd Infantry Brigade Combat Team (32nd IBCT)
- 1st Squadron, 105th Cavalry Regiment RSTA (reconnaissance, surveillance, and target acquisition)
- 3rd Battalion, 126th Infantry Regiment (Michigan National Guard)
- 2nd Battalion, 127th Infantry Regiment
- 1st Battalion, 128th Infantry Regiment
- 1st Battalion, 120th Field Artillery Regiment (1-120th FAR)
- 173rd Brigade Engineer Battalion (173rd BEB) (formerly Special Troops Battalion, 32nd BCT)
- 132nd Brigade Support Battalion (132nd BSB)

== Operation Iraqi Freedom ==
=== Units deployed to Iraq in 2004–05 ===
First Battalion, 128th Infantry Regiment

- Activated: 10 June 2004
- In theater: November, 2004
- Return: 25 October 2005
- Location: FOB O'Ryan, FOB Cobra, FOB McKenzie, Patrol Base Olson, and the Kaufman Compound
- 6 KIA (TF 1–128) includes attached Units

Second Battalion, 127th Infantry Regiment

- Activated: June, 2005
- In theater: August, 2005
- Return: August, 2006
- 3 KIA
- Location: CSC Navistar, Kuwait

Second Battalion, 128th Infantry Regiment

- Activated: August, 2005
- In theater: November, 2005
- Return: November 2006
- Locations:

A Company Camp Navistar, Al-Abdali, Kuwait.
B Company Camp Victory, Kuwait, then Camp Virginia after its closure.
C Company Camp Buehring, Udairi Range, Kuwait, Ali Al-Salim airbase L.S.A.
D Company Camp Virginia, Kuwait. HHC at Camp Buehring, Kuwait.

First Battalion, 120th Field Artillery Regiment (United States)

- Activated: August, 2005
- In theater: November, 2005
- Return: November, 2006
- Location: Kuwait Naval Base, Ash Shuayba SPOD, LSA, C Battery: Camp As Sayliyah, Qatar, Camp Virginia, LSA (Ali Al Salem), Balad, Baghdad, Hillah, Iraq

=== Units deployed to Iraq in 2009 ===
In September 2008, the entire 32nd Brigade and six other related units received mobilization orders directing their return to Iraq. This would be the largest operational deployment of Wisconsin Army National Guard forces since World War II. They began training and preparing for deployment in January 2009. The brigade completed three weeks of training at Camp Blanding Joint Training Center in Florida on 30 January 2009, prior to activation.

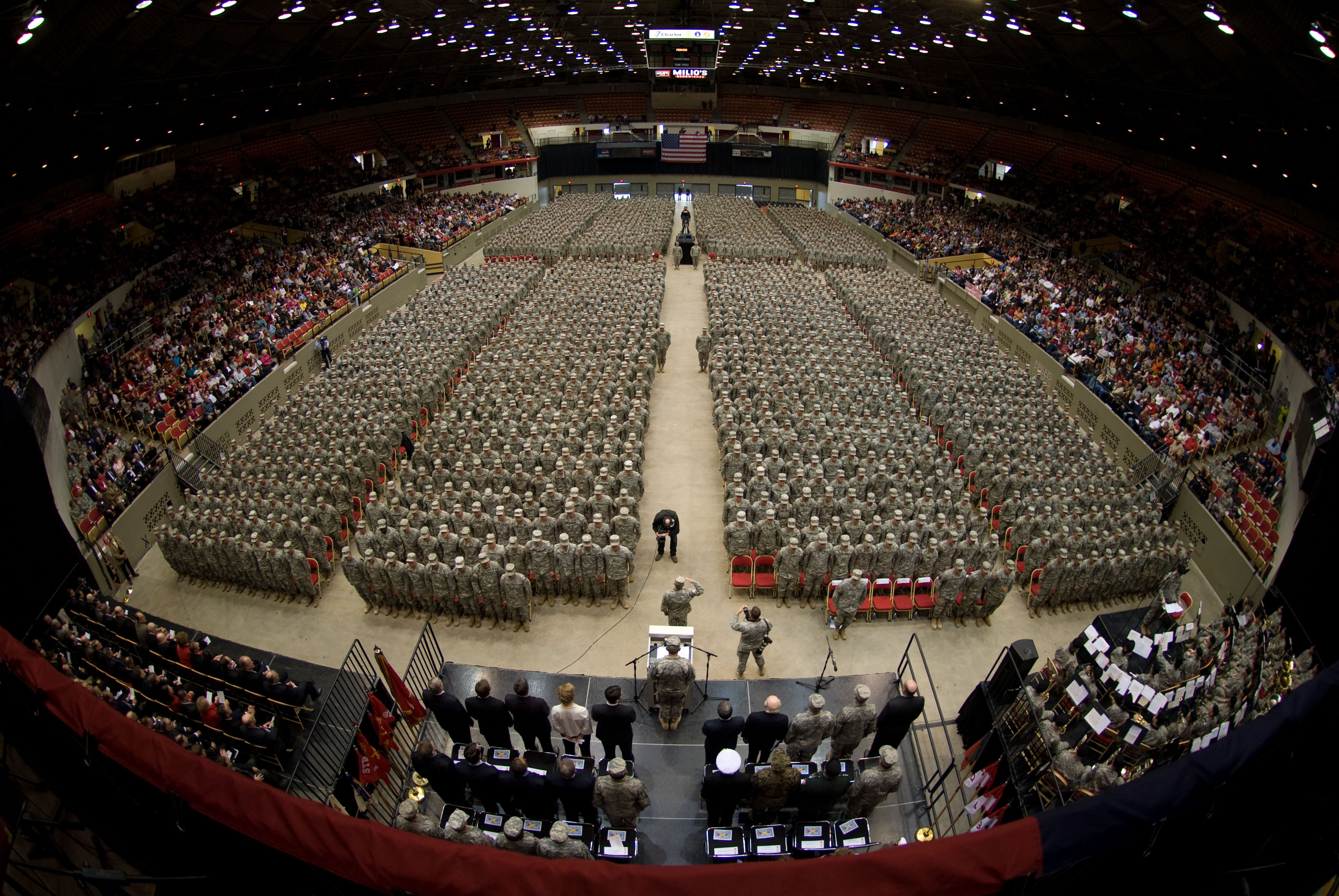
The 32nd Infantry Brigade Combat Team prepares for deployment in February 2009.

In February 2009 the entire BCT, consisting of 3,200 Wisconsin Army National Guard soldiers, was activated along with six supporting units outside the brigade. They were given a send-off on 17 February 2009 at the Alliant Energy Center Veterans Memorial Coliseum in Madison, Wisconsin. The soldiers reported to Fort Bliss in elements of 400–600 soldiers by 1 March to complete preparations for a one-year deployment. Sgt. Pete Smoczyk and Col. Tommy Makal, two World War II veterans who served in the 32nd Infantry Division during World War II when it was last called up for overseas combat duty, also marched out with the brigade. Spc. Marissa Hendriks, Smoczyk's granddaughter, deployed to Iraq with the unit.

The units activated were:

- Headquarters and Headquarters Company (HHC), 32nd Infantry Brigade Combat Team, based out of Camp Williams, at Camp Douglas, Wisconsin. As of September 2009, the HHC served as the Joint Area Support Group-Central in the International Zone in Baghdad, Iraq and was responsible for administering, securing, and transitioning the International Zone.
- 1st Squadron, 105th Cavalry Regiment (RSTA)
- Headquarters and Headquarters Troop (HHT), 1st Squadron, 105th Cavalry – Madison
- Troop A, 1st Squadron, 105th Cavalry – Fort Atkinson
- Troop B, 1st Squadron, 105th Cavalry – Watertown

2nd Battalion, 127th Infantry Regiment (2-127th IR)

- Headquarters and Headquarters Company (HHC), 2nd Battalion, 127th Infantry – Appleton

Detachment 1, Headquarters Company, 2nd Battalion, 127th Infantry – Clintonville

- Company A, 2nd Battalion, 127th Infantry – Waupun

Detachment 1, Company A, 2nd Battalion, 127th Infantry – Ripon

- Company B, 2nd Battalion, 127th Infantry – Green Bay
- Company C, 2nd Battalion, 127th Infantry – Fond du Lac
- Company D, 2nd Battalion, 127th Infantry – Marinette

1st Battalion, 128th Infantry Regiment

- Headquarters and Headquarters Company (HHC), 1st Battalion, 128th Infantry – Eau Claire

Detachment 1, Headquarters Company, 1st Battalion, 128th Infantry – Abbotsford

- Company A, 1st Battalion, 128th Infantry – Menomonie
- Company B, 1st Battalion, 128th Infantry – New Richmond

Detachment 1, Company B, 1st Battalion, 128th Infantry – Rice Lake

- Company C, 1st Battalion, 128th Infantry – Arcadia

Detachment 1, Company C, 1st Battalion, 128th Infantry – Onalaska

- Company D, 1st Battalion, 128th Infantry – River Falls

1st Battalion, 120th Field Artillery Regiment

- Headquarters and Headquarters Battery (HHB), 1st Battalion, 120th Field Artillery

Wisconsin Rapids

- Battery A, 1st Battalion, 120th Field Artillery – Marshfield
- Battery B, 1st Battalion, 120th Field Artillery – Stevens Point

Special Troops Battalion, 32nd Brigade Combat Team

- Headquarters and Headquarters Company (HHC), Special Troops Battalion, 32nd Brigade Combat Team – Wausau

Detachment 1, Headquarters Company, Special Troops Battalion, 32nd Brigade Combat Team – Merrill

- Company A (Engineer), Special Troops Battalion, 32nd Brigade Combat Team – Onalaska
- Company B (MI), STB, 32nd Brigade Combat Team – Madison
- Company C (Signal), Special Troops Battalion, 32nd Brigade Combat Team – Antigo

132nd Brigade Support Battalion

- Headquarters and Headquarters Company, 132nd Brigade Support Battalion – Portage
- Company A (Distribution), 132nd Brigade Support Battalion – Janesville

Detachment 1, Company A, 132nd Brigade Support Battalion – Elkhorn

- Company B (Maintenance), 132nd Brigade Support Battalion – Mauston
- Company C (Medical), 132nd Brigade Support Battalion – Milwaukee
- Company D (FSC), 132nd Brigade Support Battalion – Baraboo

Detachment 1, Company D, 132nd Brigade Support Battalion – Madison

- Company E (FSC), 132nd Brigade Support Battalion – Waupaca

Detachment 1, Company E, 132nd Brigade Support Battalion – Appleton

- Company F (FSC), 132nd Brigade Support Battalion – Neillsville

Detachment 1, Company F, 132nd Brigade Support Battalion – Eau Claire

- Company G (FSC), 132nd Brigade Support Battalion – Mosinee

Detachment 1, Company G, 132nd Brigade Support Battalion (1-G-132nd BSB) – Wisconsin Rapids

- Company I (FSC), 132nd Brigade Support Battalion - Wyoming, Michigan

The six additional units mobilized which augmented the 32nd Brigade Combat Team had a combined authorized strength of about 1,050 soldiers in 10 Wisconsin communities. Units mobilized with the 32nd BCT were:

- Company B (Support Maintenance), 257th Brigade Support Battalion (B-257th BSB) – Kenosha
- 108th Forward Support Company (108th FSC) – Sussex
- 32nd Military Police Company (32nd MPC) – Milwaukee

Detachment 1, 32nd Military Police Company – Oconomowoc

- 829th Engineer Company (Vertical) – Chippewa Falls

Detachment 1, 829th Engineer Company – Richland Center
Detachment 2, 829th Engineer Company – Ashland

- 1158th Transportation Company – Beloit

Detachment 1, 1158th Transportation Company – Black River Falls

- Battery A, 1st Battalion, 121st Field Artillery – Racine

=== Headquarters deployed to Ukraine in 2019-2020 ===
In October 2019 the brigade headquarters and other augmentation personnel were activated and deployed to Ukraine to take over operations as the head of Joint Multinational Training Group-Ukraine headquartered at Yavoriv Combat Training Center. The unit was located just outside the village of Starychi in Lviv Oblast. Adopting the name Task Force Juvigny (pronounced "Juv-in-yay") the soldiers sustained base operations and served as advisors to the rotational units coming to the CTC for training before they were deployed to the war in Donbas. They also took part in a number of local outreach programs and charity activities as well. After a quarantine period due to the COVID-19 pandemic they returned home and were demobilized in September 2020.

=== 2024 LSCO simulation, JRTC ===
The Joint Readiness Training Center (JRTC) and Fort Johnson were the venue for a month-long National Guard exercise involving 5000 soldiers in June 2024. Live-fire training, and simulated force-on-force engagements in a large-scale combat operation (LSCO) involved the entire 32nd IBCT, as well as soldiers from other states and countries, as a readiness exercise for the National Guard.

== See also ==
- 32nd Infantry Division (United States)
