= Jörg Geerlings =

German politician (born 1972)

Jörg Geerlings MdL
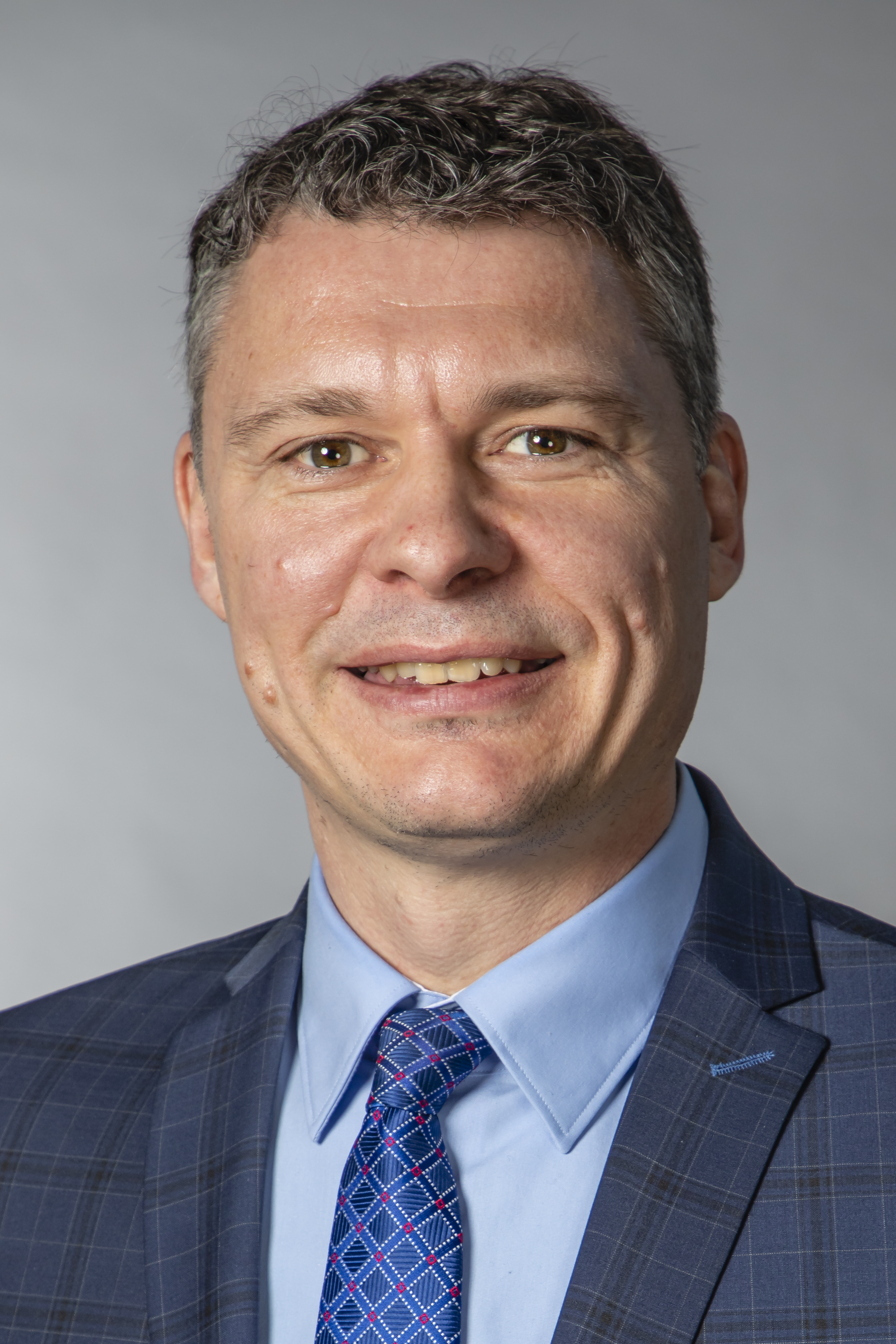
- Geerlings in 2025

Member of the Landtag of North Rhine-Westphalia
- Incumbent
- Assumed office 2010

Member of the City Council of Neuss
- Incumbent
- Assumed office 2004

Deputy Mayor of Neuss
- Incumbent
- Assumed office 2014

Chair of the CDU City Association Neuss
- In office 2005–2018

Personal details
- Born: Jörg Geerlings; 7 September 1972 (age 54) Neuss, North Rhine-Westphalia, Germany
- Party: CDU
- Education: University of Cologne
- Occupation: Politician; Lawyer
- Website: Official website

Jörg Geerlings (born 7 September 1972 in Neuss) is a German lawyer and politician (member of the state parliament) (CDU) in North Rhine-Westphalia.

== Early life and education ==
After graduating from high school and completing a banking apprenticeship, he studied law at the University of Cologne, where he earned his doctorate in 2002 with a thesis on party-affiliated foundations. He had previously completed his studies with the First State Examination and, after completing his legal clerkship at the Düsseldorf Regional Court, with the Second State Examination. Until the end of 2003, he worked in Berlin as a consultant to the German Bundestag and from 2004 to 2010 as a research assistant at the University of Cologne. He has been a lawyer since 2002 and currently works at the international law firm Ernst & Young (EY). He is married to Marie-Florence Geerlings and has one daughter.

== Politics ==
Geerlings joined the CDU in 1997. From 2005 to 2018, he was chairman of the CDU Neuss city association, and since then he has served as member representative. He has also represented his party in the Neuss City Council since 2004. Since July 2014, he has been the 3rd Deputy Mayor of the City of Neuss.

In the state elections of May 2010, Geerlings was elected to the North Rhine-Westphalia State Parliament in the Rhein-Kreis Neuss I constituency. In the early state elections on 13 May 2012, he lost the direct mandate to Reiner Breuer and left the state parliament. He ran again in the 2017 state elections and won the direct mandate in the Neuss constituency, after the CDU had nominated him again as a candidate in Neuss in early June 2016. In the 2022 state election, he defended the direct mandate with a first-vote result of 40.6 percent.

== Works ==
Jörg Geerlings is the author of numerous academic articles. His other monographs include:

Constitutional and Administrative Law Problems in the State Financing of Party-Affiliated Foundations (Ph.D.), 2003, ISBN 3-428-11002-1 Non-Smoking Protection in Germany: International and Constitutional Requirements (co-authored with Klaus Stern), 2008, ISBN 3-8006-3507-0

== Literature ==
- Jens Metzdorf (ed.): 150 Citizens. The Civic Society of Neuss 1861–2011. Civic Society of Neuss, Neuss 2012, ISBN 978-3-00-039656-4, p. 120.
