= 1st Battalion, 120th Field Artillery Regiment =

U.S. Army National Guard battalion from Wisconsin

- Coat of arms
- Active: 1917–present
- Country: United States
- Allegiance: Wisconsin
- Branch: Army National Guard
- Type: Field artillery
- Nickname(s): "Red Fox Regiment"
- Motto(s): Eager to Assist
- Equipment: M119A3 towed howitzer and M777A2 towed howitzer
- Engagements: World War I: Alsace – 1918; Champagne – 1918; Lorraine – 1918; Aisne-Marne; Oise-Aisne; Meuse-Argonne Offensive; World War II: New Guinea Campaign; Leyte Campaign; Battle of Luzon
- Decorations: Distinguished Unit Citation; French Croix de Guerre with Silver Star; Philippine Presidential Unit Citation
- Battle honours: AITAPE Campaign; Aisne-Marne; Oise-Aisne; 17 October 1944 – 4 July 1945

Commanders
- Current commander: LTC Nathan A. Bennington

Insignia
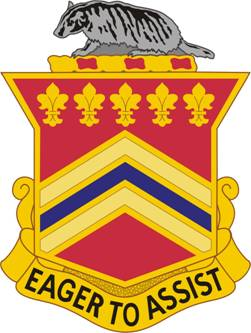
- Distinctive unit insignia

The 1st Battalion, 120th Field Artillery Regiment, also known as the "Red Fox" Battalion came into being on 22 September 1917 at Camp MacArthur, Waco, Texas, as part of the 57th Field Artillery Brigade, better known as the Iron Brigade. The 120th Field Artillery Regiment previously had been the 1st Wisconsin Cavalry. The history of the 1st Wisconsin Volunteer Cavalry Regiment goes back the American Civil War days.

Today, the 1–120th FAB (1-120th Field Artillery Battalion) is part of the 32nd IBCT (32nd Infantry Brigade Combat Team) and is headquartered in Wisconsin Rapids, Wisconsin, and has five corresponding batteries: Alpha Battery is located in Marshfield, Wisconsin; Bravo Battery is located in Stevens Point, Wisconsin; Charlie Battery, located in Oconomowoc, Wisconsin; Delta Battery, located in Berlin, Wisconsin; and Headquarters Battery which is located in Wisconsin Rapids, Wisconsin.

== History ==
=== World War I ===
The 1–120th FA, as part of the 57th Field Artillery Brigade continued its training with the 32d Infantry Division at Camp Mac Arthur until February 1918. The entire division was then ordered to Europe. The 120th Field Artillery Landed at Liverpool, England and then traveled by rail to South Hampton and across the English Channel to Le Havre, France.

In France the 120th trained at Camp De Coëtquidan, an old French artillery camp. It was here that it was equipped with French 75's and horses. Shortly before the 57th Brigade was ordered to the front in Alsace, the 2nd Battalion of the 120th was sent to Saumur, France with its batteries acting as training batteries for the Saumur Artillery School. The balance of the battalion arrived in Belfort with the 57th Brigade on 8 June and marched to the front as a part of the 32nd Division, for the first time since leaving Camp MacArthur.

The 120th Field Artillery went into action in the Château-Thierry sector on 1 August 1918 near Rancheros in support of the 32d Division. After the 32nd Division had taken Juivgay, the 32nd Division was relieved by the 2nd Moroccan Division, which included the famous "French Foreign Legion". The 120th FA remained in the line in support of the Foreign Legion and helped blast a path for the charge of the Foreign Legion. The 120th, along with the 57th Brigade, was congratulated for the part they played in this action by the commanding general of the 1st Moroccan Infantry Division, General Panot, and by French corps commander, General Charles Mangin.

=== World War II ===
On 15 October 1940, the 32d Division "The Red Arrows" was called into federal service. The units left for Camp Beauregard, LA. In February 1941 they moved to Camp Livingston and six months later, when 32d Division reorganized, the 2d Battalion of the 120th became the 129th Division Field Artillery. The 1st Battalion of the 120th Field Artillery Regiment became the 120th Field Artillery Battalion. The 32nd Division sailed from San Francisco on 22 April 1942 and arrived in Australia and arrived in Port Adelaide in South Australia on 14 May 1942. The Division was initially stationed and trained at Camp Woodside and Camp Sandy Creek, both near Adelaide. In July 1942 the 129th and the 120th moved to Camp Cable, in Queensland about 30 miles south of Brisbane.

In November 1942 Battery A, 129th FA was sent into New Guinea while the other batteries remained at Camp Cable, Australia. The four gun sections of Battery A were the first howitzers flown into a combat area, which landed at Port Moresby. One-half of Battery A flew over the Owen-Stanley Mountains to Buna. Battery A became the first United States Army artillery to be flown into combat in the Pacific during World War II.

After the Buna Campaign, A Battery returned to Camp Cable with the 32d Division. The 129th took part in the Saidor and Aitape Campaigns in New Guinea. The 129th left from Hollandia, New Guinea in November 1944 and took part in the Leyte Campaign for the Ormoc Corridor. In January 1945 they arrived at Lamon Bay on Luzon for the Luzon Campaign on the Villa Verde Trail. After V-J Day, 14 August 1945, the battalion left the Philippine Islands for occupation duty in Japan. It was reactivated as the 120th Field Artillery Battalion, a part of the 32d Infantry Division on 9 June 1947.

=== Post World War II ===
==== Berlin Crisis ====
Exactly twenty one years to the day after the World War II activation, the 120th was again called to federal service and was sent to Fort Lewis, WA, for training. The call to federal service was a result of the "Berlin Crisis of 1961". While stationed at Fort Lewis the units were assigned along with the 32nd Division to the Strategic Army Command (STRAC). On 10 August 1962 the entire 32nd Division was released from federal service and returned to Wisconsin where they once again reverted to the Wisconsin Army National Guard.

On 30 December 1967 the 32nd Division was reorganized and redesignated as the 32nd Infantry Brigade, a non-divisional separate brigade. The 120th Field Artillery again lost the 2nd Battalion through inactivation. The 1st Battalion, 120th Field Artillery became the direct support artillery battalion for the 32nd Brigade, which is its present configuration.

==== State activations ====
- July 1967 at Milwaukee (race riot)
- October 1969 at Madison (welfare marchers)
- May 1970 at Madison (Sterling Hall bombing)
- January 1975 at Gresham (occupation of the Novitiate)
- July 1977 at the Fox Lake Correctional Institute (state employee strike).
- August 1992 at Wautoma (Tornado)
- August 1994 at Big Flats (Tornado)
- March 1996 at Weyauwega (hazardous material train derailment)
- April 2020 at Madison and Milwaukee (Civil Disturbance Support)
- April, May, August, and November 2020 throughout the state (Wisconsin Elections Commission Support)
- April–December 2020 throughout the state (COVID-19 Support)

=== Operation Iraqi Freedom ===
==== 1st Tour ====
On 13 May 2005, the 1–120th Field Artillery received its alert notification. Upon receiving notification every soldier was called and informed of an impending deployment. In June the unit received its mobilization order to report for active duty on 10 August 2005. In late June the battalion was reorganized both due to receiving a non-artillery mission and a lack of soldiers. Soldiers from Alpha and Charlie Battery of the 1–126th Field Artillery, from Whitewater and Racine, WI respectively, formed Charlie Battery in the 1–120th. On 13 August the 1–120th departed Volk Field, WI for Camp Shelby, MS for approximately three months of pre-deployment training and mobilization processing.

On 28 August 2005 training was suspended because of the approach of Hurricane Katrina. At 1030 hours on August 29 soldiers were restricted to their barracks, to reduce the chance of injury from flying debris, falling trees and downed power lines. The battalion endured the storm without injury however; the base was shut down for several days due to the damage caused. The 1–120th assisted with the post-Katrina cleanup effort, for this each soldier received the Humanitarian Service Medal.

The battalion arrived in Kuwait on 4 November 2005 and were transported to Camp Buehring in Udari, Kuwait. From there each battery received their individual missions. HHS was stationed at Camp Patriot located inside of the Kuwaiti Navy Base (KNB) their mission was to provide an area reaction force(ARF) and operate the battalion headquarters. Alpha Battery was stationed at Camp Arifjan and Shuaybah Port (SPOD) their mission was the security of the SPOD, a main port for unit equipment coming in and out of Kuwait. Brovo Battery was stationed with HHS at Camp Patriot and provided the base's security force. Charlie Battery was first stationed at Camp Virginia and the Ali Al Salem Air Base their mission was to provide armed escorts for buses to and from the airbase and the Kuwait airport. One platoon was sent to Qatar to provide security to ASG Qatar. On 1 January 2006, Charlie Battery received orders to move into Iraq. In March 2006 Charlie Battery departed Kuwait and was flown to Camp Anaconda, Iraq. There they were OPCON to Combined Joint Special Operations Task Force-Arabian Peninsula (CJSOTF-AP). Charlie Battery was located in three locations: Balad, Baghdad, and Hillah. Charlie Battery conducted detainee operations, FOB security, and security mission with Special Forces unit.

During the mobilization the 1–120th did not suffer any combat casualties; however one soldier, SPC Jason Greeno, was killed in a traffic accident during his mid-tour leave.

After almost 12 months in country on October 26, 2006, the 1–120th FA BN transferred authority over to the 2–142nd Field Artillery BN. The 1–120th returned to Fort McCoy, WI on 4–5 November 2006 to a welcome home ceremony and the unit was released from active duty.

==== 2nd Tour ====
On 1 February 2009, the entire 32nd IBCT was mobilized again in support of Operation Iraqi Freedom. The units left Wisconsin as staggered intervals throughout February for pre-deployment training at Fort Bliss, TX. The units left Texas at staggered intervals from late April through May for deployment overseas to Iraq. This was the largest combat deployment of the Wisconsin Army National Guard since World War II.

In January 2010 the 32nd IBCT returned to Volk Field, WI from Iraq. They conducted demobilization throughout January and were released from active duty.

== "Red Fox" nickname ==
In the heat of summer in 1971, the 1–120 FA BN was conducting its annual training on Fort McCoy, Wisconsin. As rumor has it, a red fox was either run over or found on the side of the road by some soldiers. As a prank, those soldiers threw the carcass in the tent of LTC Owen P. Rexford. After the situation was defused, the tail of the fox was cut off and used as an antenna flag for LTC Rexford's jeep. His radio name was "Red Fox 1" from that point on. Later, the entire battalion adopted the name of "Red Fox". On January 17, 1985, the Secretary of the Army signed an order awarding the 120th Field Artillery Regiment the special designation of the "Red Fox Regiment".

== Heraldry ==
The shield is red for Artillery. The colors of the chevron and the chevronel – yellow and blue – are the colors of the arms of service from which the organization was developed. The combination of the colors, red, blue and yellow, form the colors of the Puerto Rican Occupation medal ribbon indicating the service of Battery A in Puerto Rico. The five fleurs-de-lis symbolize the five major engagements of the organization in France during World War I.

== Commanders ==
LTC Robert Wildish	01 JUN 62 – 15 DEC 70 (2–120th)
	1–120th effective 30 DEC 67
LTC James R. Bowersox	16 DEC 70 – 25 MAR 71
LTC Owen P. Rexford	26 MAR 71 – 1 OCT 72
LTC Robert J. Dehlinger	02 OCT 72 – 30 NOV 77
LTC Norman E. Thusius	01 DEC 77 – 18 MAR 78
LTC George W. Peterson	19 MAR 78 – 17 JUL 82
LTC Ellis J. Langjahr	18 JUL 82 – 09 JUL 84
LTC Ernest Woorster	10 JUL 84 – 20 SEP 87
LTC Thomas J. Kester	21 SEP 87 – 19 MAY 89
LTC Robert J. Kilcoyne	20 MAY 89 – 17 MAY 92
LTC John T. Schwenner	18 MAY 92 – 30 SEP 95
LTC Gregory R. Disher	01 OCT 95 – 26 APR 98
LTC Mark E. Anderson	27 APR 98 – 14 JUL 00
LTC Mark W. Mathwig	15 JUL 00 – 30 JUN 02
LTC Peter E. Seaholm	01 JUL 02 – 31 MAR 05
LTC Gary M. Skon	01 APR 05 – 1 Jul 10
LTC Ryan C. Brown	2 Jul 10 – 13 OCT 12
LTC Jeffrey T. Kurka	14 OCT 12 – 06 NOV 15
LTC Brian J. Leahy	07 NOV 15 – 02 MAR 19
LTC Nathan A. Bennington	03 MAR 19 – Present
