= Herman Bottcher =

Recipient of the Distinguished Service Cross

Herman John Bottcher
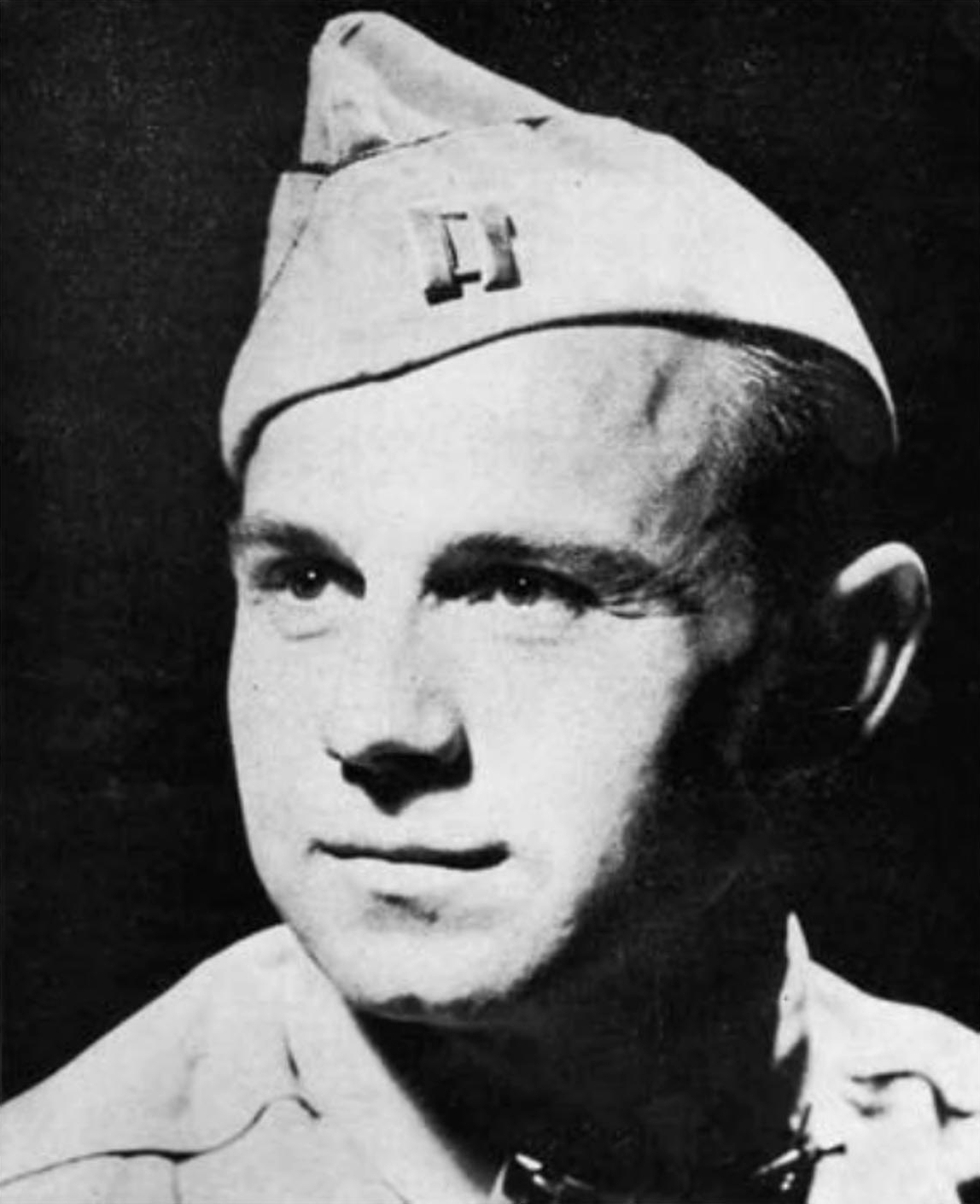
- Bottcher in 1944
- Born: July 13, 1909; Landsberg, Germany
- Died: December 31, 1944 (aged 35) near Silad Bay, Leyte, Philippines
- Burial place: Manila, Philippines
- Military career
- Allegiance: Spanish Republic; United States
- Branch: International Brigades; United States Army
- Service years: 1937–1939; 1941–1944
- Rank: Corporal; Captain
- Units: The "Abraham Lincoln" XV International Brigade; 32nd Infantry Division
- Conflicts: Spanish Civil War; Battle of Madrid; World War II; Battle of Buna-Gona; Battle of Aitape; Battle of Leyte
- Awards: Distinguished Service Cross (2); Silver Star; Legion of Merit; Bronze Star Medal; Purple Heart (4); Spanish Medal of Valour

Herman John Bottcher (born Hermann Johann Friedrich Bottcher; July 13, 1909 – December 31, 1944) was an American soldier born in Germany, who was awarded the rank of captain in two different armies, the communist International Brigade during the Spanish Civil War and the United States Army during World War II. He was awarded two U.S. Distinguished Service Crosses, the highest U.S. military decoration after the Medal of Honor, for conspicuous bravery and leadership on the field of battle during two separate actions at the Battle of Buna–Gona.

Lieutenant General Robert L. Eichelberger immediately promoted him from Staff Sergeant to Captain for his leadership and heroism during the battle from December 5–11, 1942. His daring attack turned the tide of the Buna advance by separating the enemy-held Buna Mission from the Buna village. This same action resulted in his first DSC award. Bottcher became a U.S. citizen in New Guinea in December 1943.

== Early years ==
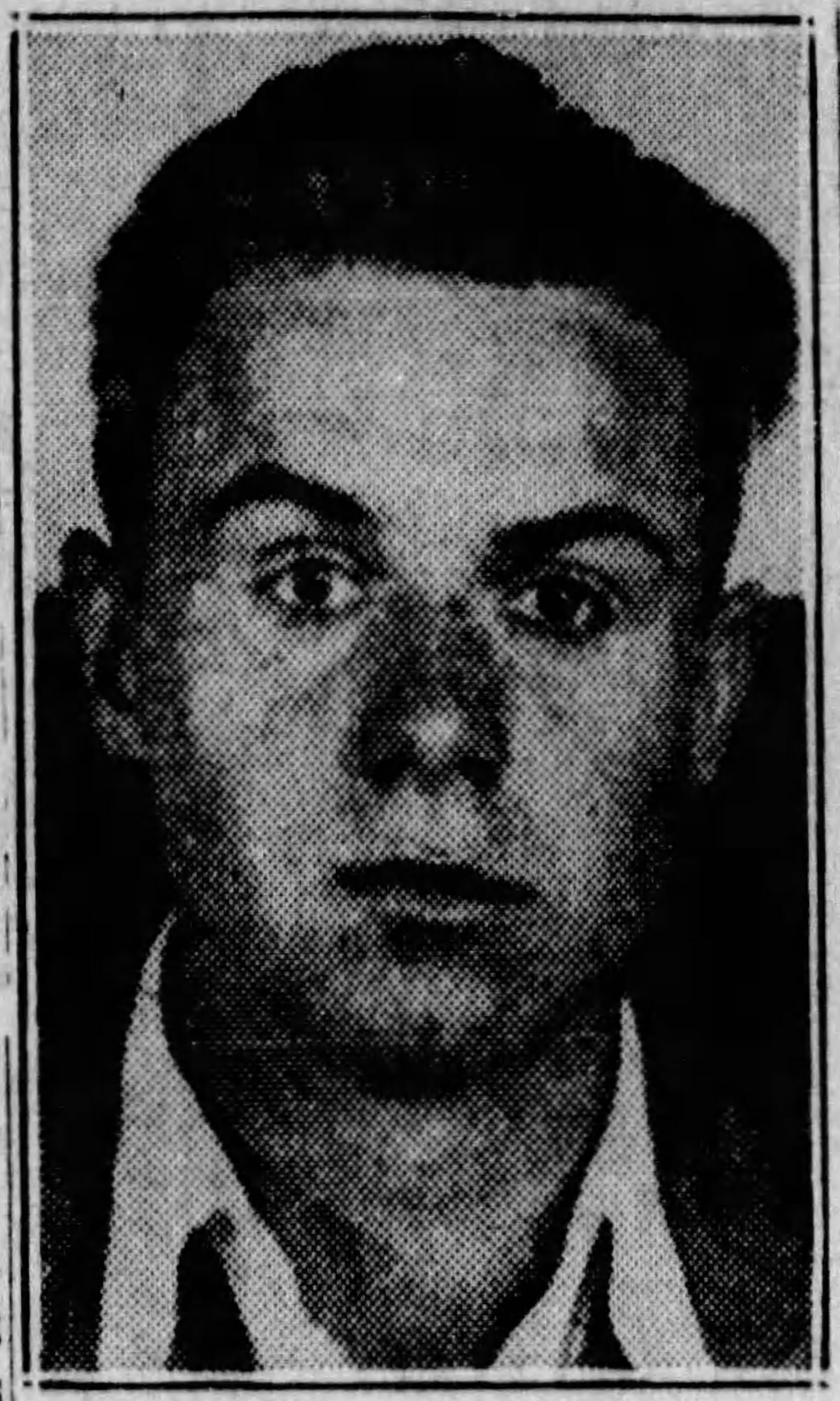
Bottcher as a student at San Francisco State

Herman Bottcher was born in Landsberg, Kingdom of Prussia, German Empire. He was orphaned at an early age: his mother died while he was a toddler and his father was killed during World War I. He was raised by his father's brother, George Bottcher. He trained as a cabinetmaker and carpenter and studied architecture in Germany before immigrating to Australia following his uncle. In 1931, Herman Bottcher emigrated to the United States via Australia and lived in San Francisco. During the Great Depression, Bottcher was a student at San Francisco State College and studied sociology, applying for American citizenship in 1933 in a procedure of the time referred to as "first papers".

== Spanish Civil War ==
At some point and possibly prior to his entry to the United States, Bottcher became active in the labor movement and socialist politics, joining the Communist Party USA in 1932. In 1937, Bottcher interrupted his college studies to fight in the Spanish Civil War, which pitted the pro-Republican loyalists against a nationalist coalition led (among others) by General Francisco Franco. The nationalists received support from Fascist Italy and Nazi Germany, the republicans received aid from the Soviet Union. Bottcher served in a variety of locations and capacities throughout his time in Spain and was elevated to the rank of comisario, or Captain in the summer of 1938. During his 23 months in country, Bottcher was wounded twice, once in the Battle of Madrid and once at Aragon. In March 1939, when Spanish Prime Minister Juan Negrín ordered the withdrawal of the International Brigades, Bottcher, who had received three Spanish military decorations, including the Spanish Medal of Valour, returned to San Francisco, and continued his college education in sociology. Because he was not yet a citizen and had interrupted his residence while fighting in Spain, as with many non-citizen veterans of the Spanish Civil War, Bottcher was forced to apply for his first papers again, which he did in San Francisco in 1939.

== World War II ==
Herman Bottcher was slightly wounded while he led his unit's advance at Buna Gona.

The day after the Japanese attack on Pearl Harbor, Bottcher reported to his local draft board in San Francisco, where he lived at 239 Ramsell Street, to volunteer for service. He eventually enlisted in the U.S. Army at the Presidio of Monterey on January 5, 1942, less than one month after the attack on Pearl Harbor. Because of his immigration status, he joined the U.S. Army as a German citizen. After boot camp and training, he was assigned to the 32nd Infantry Division, a former National Guard unit composed of men originally from Wisconsin and Michigan. The 32nd was activated for federal service in 1940 and had been actively training and preparing since then. However, while slated for duty in Europe and awaiting embarkation for Northern Ireland, in the spring of 1942, the 32nd Division was diverted from Fort Devens in Massachusetts to California for staging and transport to the South West Pacific Theater. Hermann joined the 126th Infantry Regiment on the West coast. While the division was en route to the Southwest Pacific on board seven Matson Line ships, pressed into wartime service, Herman was promoted to staff sergeant. The 32nd arrived in Australia on May 14, 1942.

=== The Battle of Buna ===
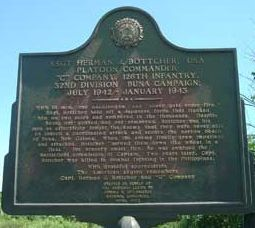
Plaque in Buna dedicated to Herman Bottcher and the men of the 32nd Division

The 32nd's Divisional Headquarters and two regimental combat teams formed around the 126th and 128th Infantry Regiments, including Bottcher, were deployed to Port Moresby between September 15 and 29, 1942. General MacArthur believed, based on available intelligence, that the U.S. forces could guard the right flank of the Australian forces and entrap the Imperial Japanese troops between the two allied forces. Beginning on October 14, 900 troops of the 2nd Battalion, 114th Engineer Battalion, 19th Portable Hospital, and the 107th Quartermaster Company of 126th Infantry, commanded by Lt. Col. Henry A. Geerds, departed in stages from Karekodobu, nicknamed "Kalamazoo" by the GIs who had a hard time pronouncing the local name. Bottcher was a member of Company "H" during the march.

The troops were charged with making an extremely difficult trek inland over the Kapa Kapa Trail toward Jaure, where they were to flank the Japanese on the Kokoda Trail. The total distance over the mountains to the Japanese positions was over 130 miles (210 km), and most of the trail was barely a goat path. Hundreds of men suffered from malaria, dengue fever, bush typhus, amoebic dysentery, bacillary, along with jungle rot, dobie itch, trench foot, athlete's foot and ringworm. Their rate of advance compared to the Australian soldiers was considerably slower.

Meanwhile, the Japanese at Buna were building hundreds of coconut log bunkers. These had mutually supporting lines of fire and were organized in depth. The bunkers were often linked by trenches allowing the Japanese to move at will among them, reinforcing one another.

On November 16, 1942, US forces joined the already battling Australian troops in the region and commenced to attack the Imperial Japanese Army stronghold at Buna, Sanananda and Gona. Bottcher, promoted to staff sergeant, was appointed as platoon commander of "H" Company of the 126th Infantry Regiment. On December 5, 1942, when "H" Company and sister units were pinned down by enemy fire, Bottcher took the initiative and led a 31-strong detachment forward against the attacking force. Wading across a creek under constant mortar fire, Bottcher led twelve volunteers through to the Buna beach. He stood up and threw hand grenades at the enemy knocking out several pillboxes en route and was able to drive a wedge between Buna beach and Buna village. Bottcher, one eardrum broken by mortar blast, his hand cut by shrapnel, held that wedge. Bottcher ordered his men to dig in at once on the edge of the beach, which became known as "Bottcher's Corner." He and his men fought against enemy attacks from both the village and the fortified beach which resulted in the death of numerous enemy soldiers. Bottcher's break-through completed the isolation of Buna village and is considered to be a turning point of the battle. Australian war correspondent George Johnston reported in Time magazine on September 20, 1943:

The American, Herman Bottcher, led twelve volunteers into the Japanese positions, built fortifications on the beach. Constantly under fire, Bottcher provided a diversion that resulted in Allied victory. By a conservative count ... Bottcher and his twelve men ... killed more than 120 Japs.

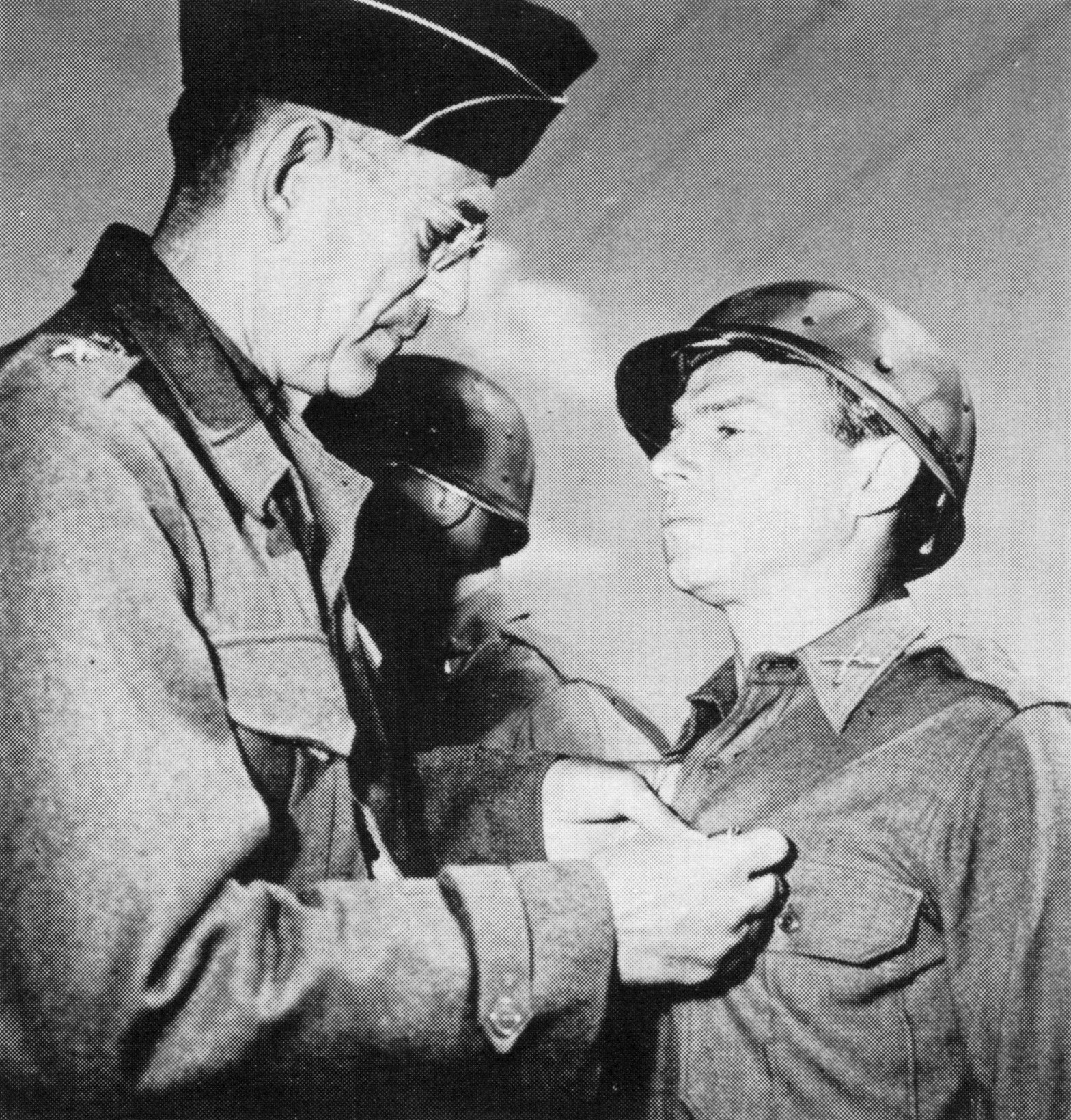
Bottcher is awarded the Distinguished Service Cross by Major General William H. Gill, 1943

Bottcher was awarded the battlefield commission of Captain and his first Distinguished Service Cross. On December 20, Bottcher led a detachment of his men in an attack and that was within 20 yards of the enemy, when he stood up to draw the enemy fire upon himself so that his men could move forward. He was wounded twice and awarded a second DSC for his actions. He was sent to Australia, for treatment of his three wounds.

== Final battle ==
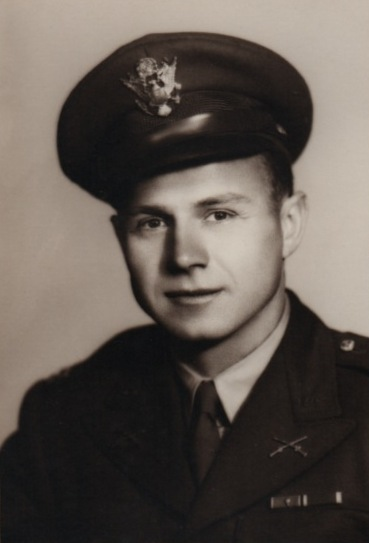
Portrait taken in Sydney c. 1944

In June 1943, Bottcher returned to the 32nd Division and was assigned to Company "A" of the 127th Regiment and participated in the Saidor invasion and Aitape campaigns in New Guinea as part of the greater Operation Cartwheel. In June 1944, Bottcher was assigned as commanding officer to the new 32nd Cavalry Reconnaissance Troop (Mechanized). On December 29, 1944, a correspondent from Yank, the Army Weekly was looking for Bottcher, presumably for the purpose of writing a story about him. Bottcher's men had spent more than 40 days behind enemy lines during the Battle of Leyte when, on December 31, 1944, a group of Japanese soldiers encountered Bottcher's men and attacked them with small arms fire and mortar rounds, one of which fell directly into Bottcher's position. The next day, Bottcher's men sent the following radio message: "Bottcher dead. Recon troop withdrawing west ..." Captain (later Major) Dick Tucker, sent the following message to the news wires: "Captain Herman Bottcher, veteran soldier in the fight against Fascism, hero of the battle of Buna and reconnaissance-troop commander, whose exploits had become legend among the men who were fighting the Pacific war, lay dead on a hill overlooking Silad Bay." Bottcher is buried in the Manila American Cemetery, Manila in Plot L Row 4 Grave 134.

== Legacy ==
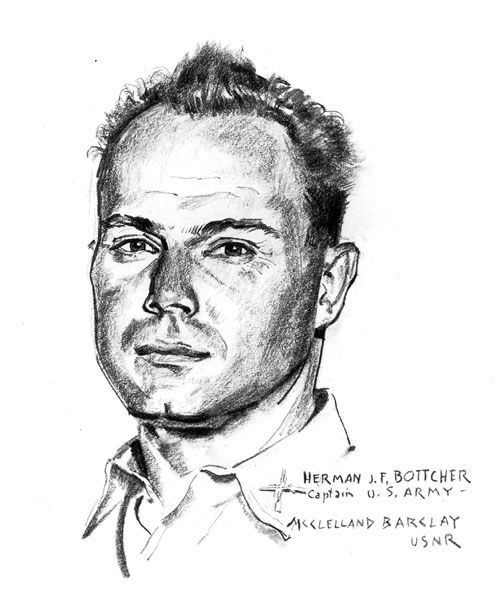
Portrait by McClelland Barclay, 1944

There is a memorial plaque at Buna today which is dedicated to Bottcher's role in the battle. In 1945, Sgt. John Rossen wrote an eloquent poem that pays tribute to Bottcher and the sacrifice he made in his fight against fascism. This poem went on to inspire the artist Pierre Daura to create a painting that commemorates Bottcher and captures the tone of the poem which was anti-fascist. In this work, found in the Taubman Museum of Art's permanent collection, located in Roanoke, Virginia, a mourner kneels beside Bottcher's grave, marked with a cross and his helmet and covered with a palm leaf, and looks toward Heaven. He clearly contemplates Bottcher's sacrifice as his eyes are closed. Rossen and Bottcher served together in the Abraham Lincoln Brigade during the Spanish Civil War. Daura also fought in the Spanish Civil War against Franco, but he was not a member of the Abraham Lincoln Brigade.

In an article published in the Saturday Evening Post on August 13, 1949, Lieutenant General Robert L. Eichelberger (former commander in the Buna campaign) wrote that "On my recommendation, the Allied commander commissioned Bottcher as a captain of infantry for bravery on the field of battle. He was one of the best Americans I have ever known. ... His combat experience was extremely useful at Buna, and his patriotism as a new American was vigorous and determined." According to Eichelberger, Bottcher was "Buna's greatest hero."

== Military decorations and awards ==
Captain Bottcher's military awards include:

Combat Infantryman Badge
Distinguished Service Cross with oak leaf cluster	Silver Star	Legion of Merit
Bronze Star Medal	Purple Heart with 3 oak leaf clusters	American Campaign Medal
Asiatic-Pacific Campaign Medal with two 3/16 bronze stars	World War II Victory Medal	Philippine Liberation Medal

- Presidential Unit Citation
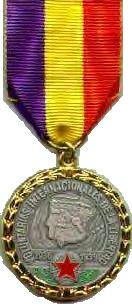
- Spanish Civil War Medal of the International Brigades
- Spanish Medal of Valour

== See also ==
- 32nd Infantry Division
