= Edwin F. Harding =

United States Army general (1886–1970)

Edwin Forrest Harding
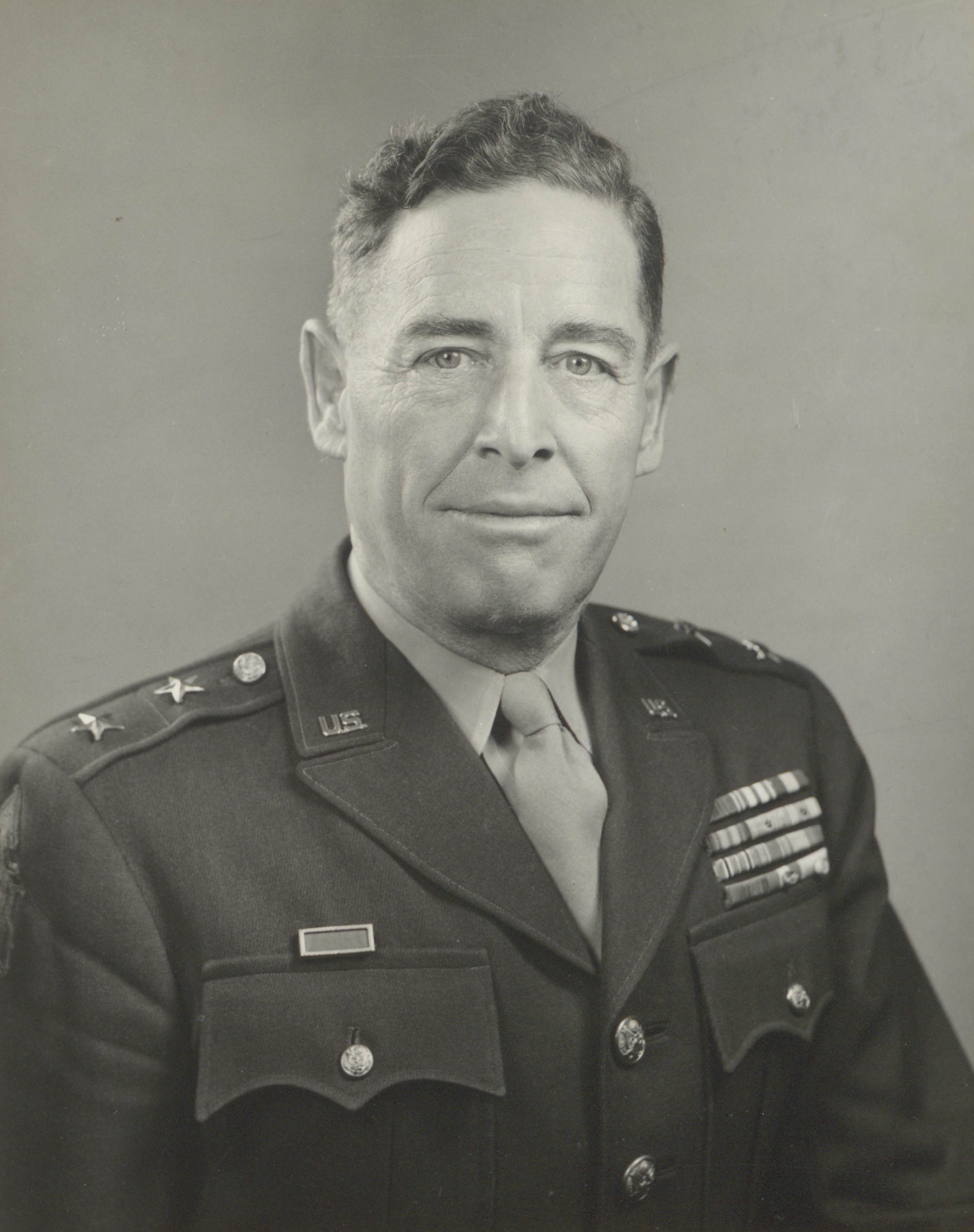
- Harding as Chief of the US Army's Historical Division c. 1945–46
- Born: September 18, 1886; Franklin, Ohio, U.S.
- Died: June 5, 1970 (aged 83); Franklin, Ohio, U.S.
- Military career
- Allegiance: United States of America
- Branch: United States Army
- Service years: 1909-1946
- Rank: Major General
- Commands: Antilles Department; Panama Mobile Force; 32nd Infantry Division; 27th Infantry Regiment
- Conflicts: World War II: Battle of Buna-Gona
- Awards: Silver Star; Legion of Merit; Army Commendation Medal

Edwin Forrest Harding (September 18, 1886 – June 5, 1970) commanded the 32nd Infantry Division at the beginning of World War II. He graduated 74th among his classmates from the United States Military Academy in 1909, who included John C. H. Lee (12), Jacob L. Devers (39), George S. Patton (46), Horace H. Fuller (59), Robert L. Eichelberger (68), and William H. Simpson (101). His first field command, the 32nd division was the first American unit, after the Battle for Guadalcanal, to engage in offensive operations in the Pacific Theater of Operations. The 32nd was understrength, ill-trained, poorly equipped, and thrust into its first battle against seasoned Japanese units. The unit finally logged a total of 654 days of combat during World War II, more than any other U.S. Army division. They were among the first to enter the war and were still engaging attacking Japanese after the Armistice was declared.

== Education and early life ==
Edwin Forrest Harding was born on September 18, 1886, in Franklin, Ohio, the son of Clarence Henry (Larry) Harding, the manager of the Harding Paper Division of the American Writing Paper Company, and his wife Lilly, née Woodward. Forrest was educated at Franklin High School and Phillips Exeter Academy. He also spent a year at Charles Braden Preparatory Academy, a special preparatory school for the United States Military Academy at West Point. He passed the entrance examination and was appointed to West Point by then Secretary of War, William Howard Taft. He graduated from West Point in the class of 1909, which also included future generals George S. Patton, Jacob L. Devers, John C. H. Lee, Robert L. Eichelberger, and William H. Simpson.

== Early military service ==
Prior to World War II, he was in 1938 a colonel in command of 27th Infantry Regiment. In 1941 he was promoted to brigadier general and assistant commander of the 9th Infantry Division.

Cover to the book Infantry in Battle, the World War II officer's guide to infantry combat operations. Harding was editor of the book which is still used as a reference today.

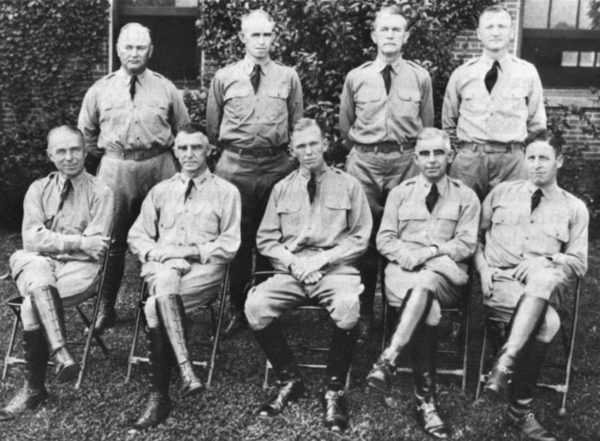
Harding (front row, extreme right) as an instructor at the Infantry School in the 1930s. The school's assistant commandant, George C. Marshall, is sat in the center of the front row.

Harding had an agile mind. He could quote T. S. Eliot or Tennyson or Kipling, and discuss history or astronomy like an Ivy League professor. Harding understood the modern military and had literally written the book on it. During 1934, Colonel George C. Marshall was assistant commandant at Fort Benning and selected Harding as an instructor and put him in charge of the Infantry School's publications. He edited Infantry in Battle, a book that codified new ideas on how to organize infantry in battle. Harding was responsible for planning the book and supervising preparation and editing of the manuscript.

The triangular division structure it described was composed of three regimental combat teams, each supported by its own simplified support and command structure. The organizational structure emphasized speed, agility, a lower casualty rate, and adaptability. This contrasted with the square division structure of World War I which was designed for attrition combat characteristic of trench warfare. Infantry in Battle is still used as an officer's training manual in the Infantry Officer's Course, and was the training manual for most of the infantry officers and leaders of World War II.

== World War II commands ==
The 32nd Infantry Division had been scheduled to receive a year of training before it left the United States. It was authorized to have a peacetime strength of about 11,600 soldiers, but like almost all units in the National Guard and the Regular Army prior to World War II, was not at full strength nor was it assigned all of the equipment it was authorized. Training for many soldiers was incomplete. Harding was a leader who exuded confidence. The 2nd Battalion of the 126th Infantry Regiment was deployed on an extremely arduous flanking maneuver on the Kapa Kapa Trail on Papua New Guinea over a 9,100 feet (2,800 m) divide toward Jaure. The total distance over the mountains to the Japanese positions was over 130 miles (209 km), and most of the trail was barely a goat path. The Kapa Kapa trail across the Owen Stanley divide was a "dank and eerie place, rougher and more precipitous" than the Kokoda Track on which the Australians were then fighting the Japanese. It was "one of the most harrowing marches in American military history."

In a first for World War II, General Douglas MacArthur ordered the 128th Infantry Regiment to be flown from Australia to New Guinea, the greatest distance the Air Force had airlifted men up to that time. When he learned how the trek across the 9,100 feet (2,800 m) mountain divide was so debilitating and lengthy, Harding requested that the remainder of the division be flown to the Buna area, to join Australian units in an assault on the main Japanese beachheads in eastern New Guinea. A local priest informed the Allies that there was a landing field on the western slopes and MacArthur ordered the rest of the 32nd flown across the Owen Stanley Range, becoming the first U.S. Army artillery flown into combat in the Pacific in World War II.

=== Attacked Buna ===
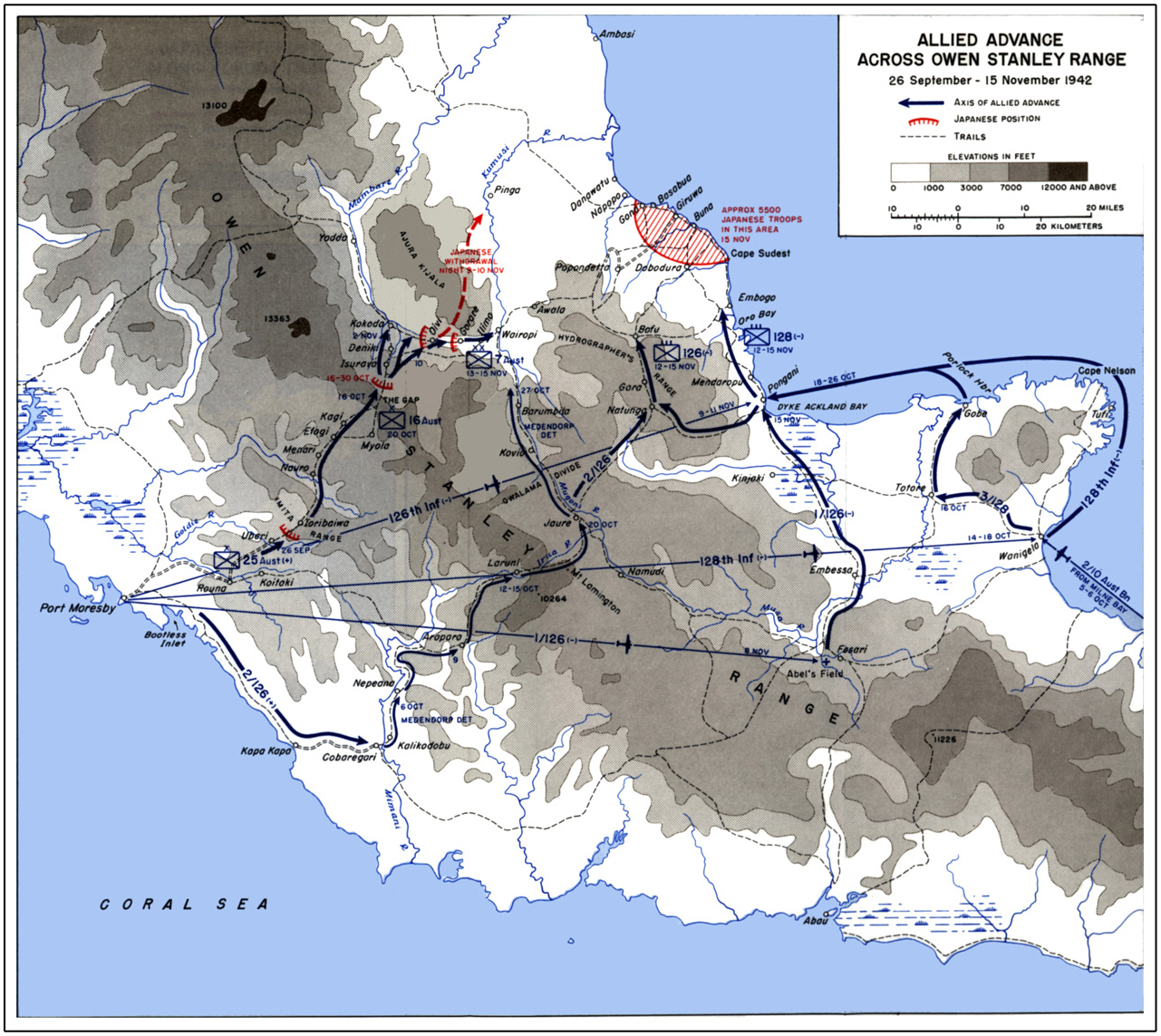
Allied Advance Across Owen Stanley Range September 26 - November 15, 1942.

With no roads through the jungle, the only way to keep the troops furnished with the food, ammunition and other goods necessary to operate against the Japanese was via airborne supply. This proved to be very problematic in the deep razorback ridges of the Owen Stanley Mountains. Because of a lack of parachutes, material was shoved off airplanes at a height of 40 or more feet, and were often damaged or completely lost due to mis-drops.

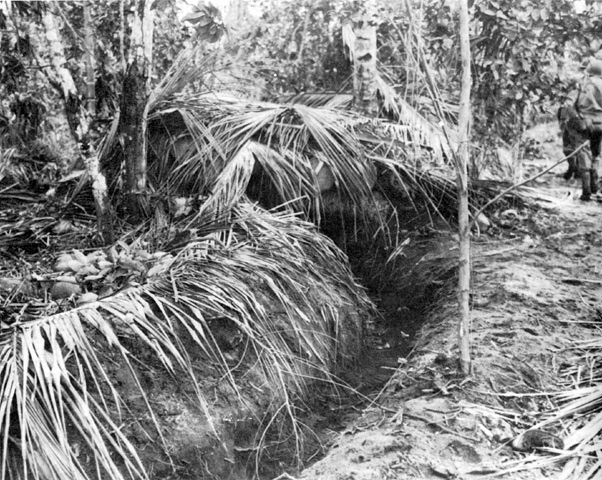
Japanese bunker at Buna made from coconut logs

Harding's division was tasked with attacking Buna on November 19, 1942. General Douglas MacArthur received intelligence from Brigadier General Charles Willoughby, who told MacArthur before the operation that there was "little indication of an attempt to make a strong stand against the Allied advance." The intelligence led him to believe that Buna was held by about 1000 sick and malnourished soldiers. Harding was nearly killed before the attack began. He was on board a coastal trawler with his headquarters company when it was attacked by Japanese aircraft. Harding saved himself by diving overboard and swimming to shore. The attack destroyed many of the supplies Harding was relying on for the upcoming attack.

=== Combat stalemate ===
Harding accepted MacArthur's decision to rely on direct air support in place of tanks or heavy artillery, and his troops were stopped cold by formidable Japanese field fortifications. With the only artillery support provided by a single 25-pounder battery with limited ammunition, the division was unable to make further progress against these positions. A stalemate ensued. When the 32nd Division failed to advance, MacArthur became so concerned about the lack of progress that he sent Major General Robert L. Eichelberger, commander of I Corps, to report on the situation. MacArthur famously said to Eichelberger,

Bob, I'm putting you in command at Buna. Relieve Harding ... I want you to remove all officers who won't fight. Relieve regimental and battalion commanders; if necessary, put sergeants in charge of battalions and corporals in charge of companies ... Bob, I want you to take Buna, or not come back alive ... And that goes for your chief of staff, too.

=== Harding relieved of command ===
Eichelberger and his staff flew into Buna, and on December 2, he inspected the left or westward-lying U.S. front, the Urbana Force. Two of his staff officers, Colonels Clarence A. Martin and Gordon B. Rogers, inspected the right flank, which was designated the Warren Force. They found the troops were ill with malaria, dengue fever, tropical dysentery, and other ailments. They discovered the men had few rations, causing them to lose weight, and lacked hot meals, vitamins, and cigarettes. Some were unshaven, their uniforms and boots were dirty and in tatters, and they showed "little discipline or military courtesy". Having been on the front at Buna for two weeks with virtually no progress to show for it except for hundreds of casualties, their morale was very poor.

Eichelberger relieved Harding on December 2, 1942. (Harding and Eichelberger had been West Point classmates in 1909.) Eichelberger also sacked the regimental commanders and most battalion commanders. He replaced Harding with the division's artillery commander, Brigadier General Albert W. Waldron. "Some of the 32nd's officers privately denounced Eichelberger as ruthless, Prussian."

Eichelberger later noted that after he relieved Harding he "ordered the medicos to take the temperature of an entire company of hollow-eyed men near the front. Every member, I repeat, every member of that company was running a fever." Eichelberger found the men lacked even the oil and patches require to keep their guns free of rust. He put an officer in charge of supply who ignored all protocols to obtain whatever the men needed. Eichelberger conspicuously wore his three stars on his shoulders among the front-line troops, ignoring the rule that officers remove their insignia at the front because they would attract enemy fire. He lost thirty pounds in thirty days at the front.

Martin later admitted, after some experience with the Japanese defenses, that had attacks been continued on the day he conducted his inspection, they would not have been successful.

== Later commands ==
MacArthur had initially promised Harding a new assignment elsewhere in the Southwest Pacific, but Harding was recalled to the United States a few weeks later. In 1943, he was made Commander of the Mobile Force in the Panama Canal Zone, and in 1944 Commander of the Antilles Department in the Caribbean, an unimportant assignment comprising 20 forts, camps and fields in the lesser islands from Cuba, Haiti, Costa Rica to Aruba, and portions of northern South America. In 1945, he was made Director of the Historical Division at the War Department for the Joint Chiefs of Staff. There he oversaw the planning of the Army's comprehensive history of World War II. He submitted a plan on December 18, 1945, in which he estimated that the full historical series would contain about 120 volumes, although only 101 of them were described.

Harding retired after 37 years of military service in 1946. He died in Franklin Ohio on June 5, 1970 of cardiac arrest at age 83.

== Notes ==
Military offices
Preceded by Irving Fish	Commanding General 32nd Infantry Division; February–December 1942	Succeeded by Albert W. Waldron
