= Ghost Mountain =

Mountain in Papua New Guinea

Coordinates: 9.516697°S 148.066864°E

Ghost Mountain is the name given by U.S. Army servicemen in 1942 to Mount Obree, a mountain in the Owen Stanley Range in the southeast of Papua New Guinea. Known locally as "Suwemalla," Ghost Mountain rises to a height of 3,080 metres (10,100 ft).

In October 1942, the U.S. Army's first intended offensive operation in the Pacific Campaign of the Second World War was across the Kapa Kapa Trail. Members of the 2nd Battalion, 126th Regiment, 32nd Red Arrow Division were ordered to flank the Japanese in a 130 miles (209 km) march on foot across the Owen Stanley Range, including crossing near Ghost Mountain, considerably east of the more well-known Kokoda Track.

The Kapa Kapa Trail across the Owen Stanley divide was a 'dank and eerie place, rougher and more precipitous' than the Kokoda Track on which the Australians and Japanese were then fighting.

Immense ridges, or "razorbacks," followed each other in succession like the teeth of a saw. As a rule, the only way the troops could get up these ridges, which were steeper than along the Kokoda Trail, was either on hands and knees, or by cutting steps into them with ax and machete. To rest, the men simply leaned forward, holding on to vines and roots in order to keep themselves from slipping down the mountainside.

Ghost Mountain earned its name from the eerie phosphorescent glow given off at night by moss-covered trees in the forests on its slopes. The mountain also claimed the lives of a number of U.S. 5th Air Force air crews during the conflict, and a civilian aircraft since then.

== See also ==
- Kokoda Track Campaign
- 32nd Infantry Division
