= Kapa Kapa Trail =

Trail in Papua New Guinea

The Kapa Kapa Trail is a steep, little-used mountain trail that stretches from the Kapa Kapa village (an English mispronunciation of Gabagaba) on the south coast of Papua New Guinea, across the extremely rugged Owen Stanley Range, to the vicinity of Jaure on the north side of the Peninsula. Also known as the Kapa Kapa-Jaure Track, the trail is parallel to but 48 kilometres (30 mi) southeast of the better-known and more accessible Kokoda Track. The 84-mile-long (135 km) Kapa Kapa Track is half again as long as the 135-mile-long (217 km) Kokoda Track. At its highest elevation of 2,700 metres (8,900 ft), it is 510 metres (1,670 ft) higher than the Kokoda Track's highest point (2,190 metres (7,190 ft)). Total ascent and descent is around 17,000 metres (56,000 ft). Because the track is very steep, difficult, and unimproved, it has been hiked by very few non-native individuals.

During World War II, more than 900 members of the United States 126th Infantry Regiment, 32nd Infantry Division trekked across it in 42 days in an attempt to flank the Japanese on the Kokoda Track. They endured an extraordinarily difficult march, and the majority of the men became ill with malaria, dengue fever, bush typhus, and tropical dysentery. It was "one of the most harrowing marches in American military history."

They never saw a Japanese soldier during their nearly month-long trek. After only a week of recuperation, the Battalion was immediately put on the front line against Japanese troops in hundreds of extremely well-concealed bunkers and machine gun emplacements developed in depth. In the ensuing battle the Americans soon ran short of ammunition, weapons, medicine, and even food.

== Name origin ==
The name "Kapa Kapa" is an English mispronunciation of Gabagaba, the coastal village where the route begins on south coast of Papua New Guinea.

== 32nd Infantry Division march ==
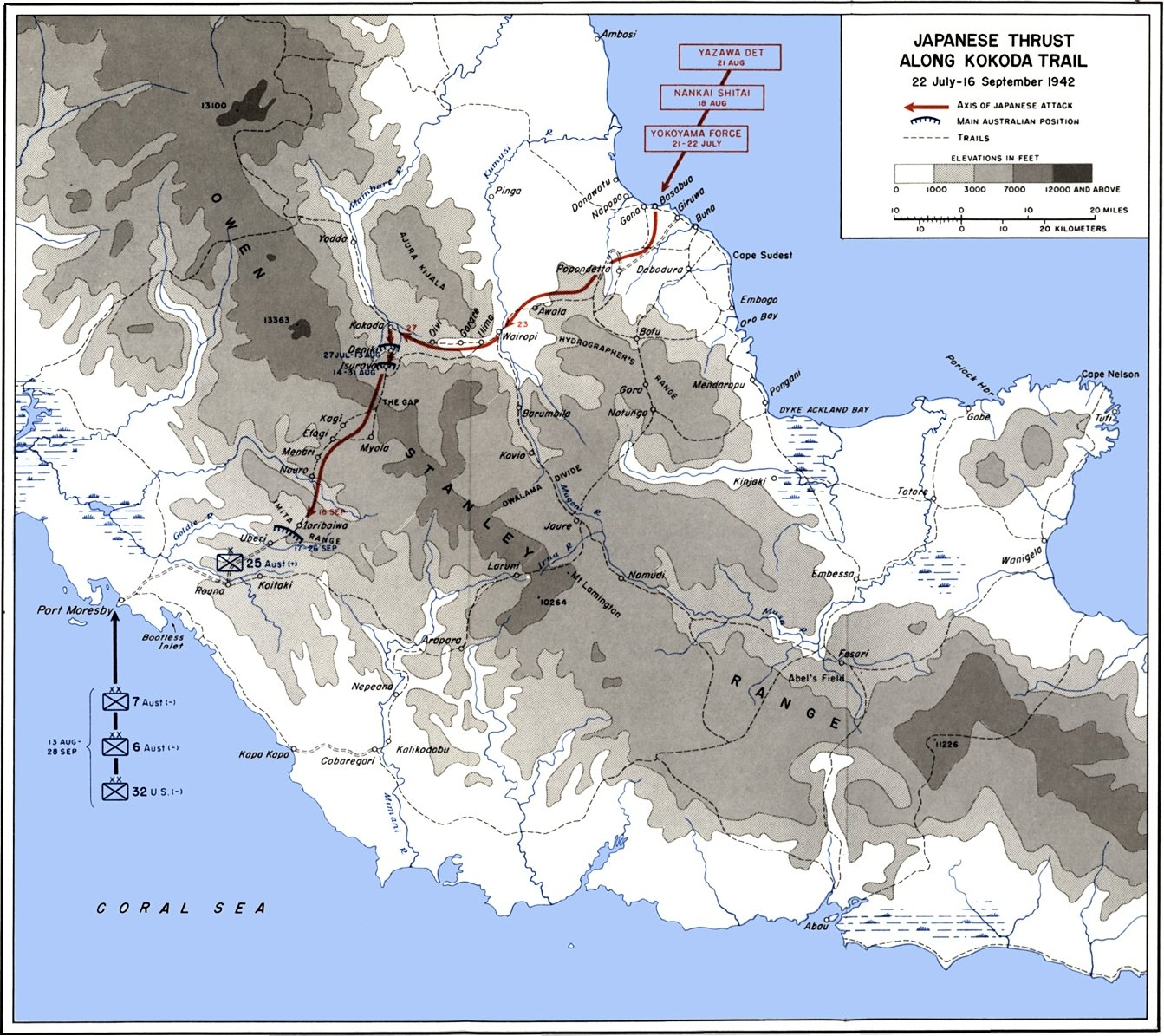
Japanese thrust along the Kokoda Trail 22 July - 16 September 1942

During the early stages of World War II, Australian Army units in the Kokoda Track campaign were under increasing pressure from Japanese forces that had advanced within 30 miles (48 km) of Port Moresby on the Kokoda Track. On 9 September, the Australian 6th Division's 16th Infantry Brigade was ordered from Australia to Port Moresby. The 25th Brigade, which had just arrived in Port Moresby, was immediately pushed to the front. General Sydney Rowell felt he could contain the Japanese with the extra troops, but MacArthur was anxious to flank the Japanese. He asked his staff to plan a flanking maneuver that would push the Japanese off the mountains more quickly.

Other Japanese units were routed to seize Samarai, an island south of Milne Bay, from which they would launch a seaborne invasion of Port Moresby. When they found that the Allies were building up Milne Bay at the southernmost tip of New Guinea, they chose to attack it instead. This effort was blunted by a vigorous Allied defense, and the Japanese withdrew on the night of 4–5 September 1942.

=== Decision to flank the Japanese ===
Since the 32nd Infantry Division had to move to another camp in any event, General Douglas MacArthur felt they should be the first to move to New Guinea. The 32nd Division's commanding General Edwin Harding told MacArthur he didn't believe the division was ready, as it had received limited training and virtually no jungle warfare training. At that time, divisions were expected to train as a unit for one year before entering combat. MacArthur nonetheless pressed Harding for a unit that could be moved to the front. Harding told MacArthur that the 126th Infantry Regiment commanded by Col. Lawrence A. Quinn was the best-trained and best-led, and it was selected for the task. The unit was ordered to prepare to move immediately, and a Brisbane cleaning establishment was given the task of dyeing the men's khaki battle fatigues a mottled green to prepare for jungle action. Only later did the troops learn that the dye used did not allow the fabric to breathe, causing sores to the skin of the men.

=== First route impractical ===
Brigadier General Hanford MacNider, in charge of the G-4 (Logistics) unit in MacArthur's headquarters group, learned almost immediately upon his arrival in Port Moresby that the previously chosen route to Wairopi across the peninsula, proposed by headquarters staff, was not practical. It traversed the Australian's rear area and a region where the soldiers could be cut off by the Japanese. It was also so mountainous that the only way they could receive supplies would be by air. Two alternative routes were considered, from Kapa Kapa to Jaure, and from Abau to Jaure. From Jaure other minor trails would lead the soldiers to Wairopi and Buna.

=== New route surveyed ===
General MacNider dispatched two groups to reconnoiter the routes. He assigned the Southwest Pacific Area chief of the Construction Section, Colonel Leif Sverdrup, to survey the route from Abau on the coast of southern New Guinea. Sverdrup set out for Jaure with a party of one American, two Australians from the Australian New Guinea Administrative Unit, ten native police from the Royal Papuan Constabulary and 26 native carriers. After eight days on the trail, scaling heights of 5,000 feet (1,500 m), Sverdrup concluded that it would not be practical for troops to traverse the route and turned back, reaching Abau on 3 October. Sverdrup soon reported that the trail starting from Abau was difficult for marching and impossible for pack animals. The Allies canceled plans to send the 127th Infantry Regiment over this route.

Closer to Port Moresby, Captain William F. Boice (Division S-2) and Lieutenant Bernard Howes took a detachment to survey the 84-mile-long (135 km) Kapa Kapa Trail, beginning in Kapa Kapa (a mispronunciation of Gabagaba, the coastal village where the route begins). From Kapa Kapa, the trail reaches Kalikodobu, Arapara, Laruni, and then Jaure. The route was roughly parallel to but about 31 miles (50 km) south of the Kokoda Trail. They, along with six men from Company E of the 126th, and some forty native porters, begun the survey of the trail in October 1942. The men soon learned that the dye applied to their uniforms in Australia caused the material to trap heat.

There was extremely little intelligence available about the route. The natives avoided it as they thought it was haunted, especially at the crest. No white man had used the route since 1917. The troops could be supported logistically by land and sea for about a third of the distance, after which they would depend on air drops. But the trail was barely a goat path. The untamed jungle terrain was extremely steep, cut by razor-sharp hogback ridges and required the men to cross a 9,100-foot-tall (2,800 m) mountain divide. The Australians didn't think it was practical for men to cross on foot. Boice nonetheless reported back that the route was feasible, and the 2nd Battalion, 126th Infantry Regiment was committed to the trail.

=== March started ===
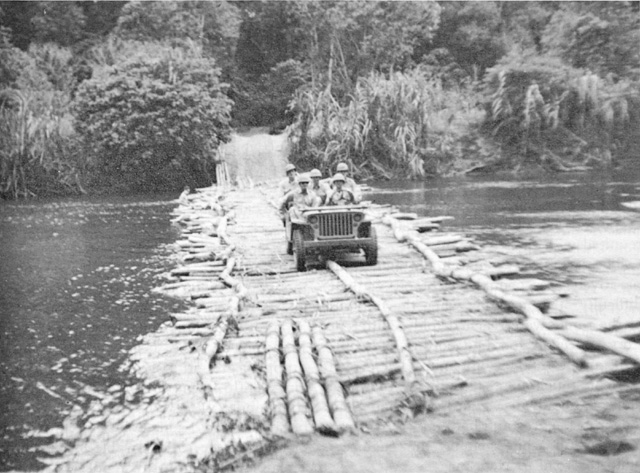
Members of the 2nd Battalion, 126th Infantry Regiment, U.S. 32nd Division, in an Army Bantam Jeep crossing a river on the southern portion of the Kapa Kapa Trail in Papua New Guinea during October 1942.

Though poorly equipped and unprepared for the task, engineers and soldiers had managed to build a road from Port Moresby along the coast to Kapa Kapa (Gabagaba). From Kapa Kapa, the engineers carved out a road first to Kalikodobu, nicknamed "Kalamazoo" by the GIs who had a hard time pronouncing the local name. At Kalamazoo, Major Baetcke was in charge of completing a forward supply base at Arapara, inland another 30 miles (48 km) by trail. The 32nd Division established a Command Post at Kalamazoo in early October.

After Kalikodobu the road was much rougher, reaching a total of 14 miles (23 km) inland to Nepeana. Parts of it were unfinished, although four-wheel drive Bantam Jeeps could complete the route. Parts were so steep and rough that natives were recruited to carry supplies inland. Most of the 2nd Battalion, 126th Infantry, was moved to Nepeana, and on 6 October 250 men from the Antitank and Cannon companies along with 100 porters left under the command of Captain Alfred Mendendorp. They were expected to march two miles per day. Their job was to establish locations for drop zones where the troops could be resupplied. They discovered that Boice's description of the track as "feasible" was misleading. The trail was a slow, exhausting march through the thick jungles and up to the cold, dense forests on the shoulder of Ghost Mountain, known locally as Suwemalla' or more officially as 'Mt. Obree'. Mendendorp arrived at the mountain top village of Larum on 13 October and established an air supply point. He then left for Jaure 16 miles (26 km) away, but taking another week to complete the trek.

Beginning on 14 October, the remaining 900 troops of the 2nd Battalion, 126th Infantry, along with the 114th Engineer Battalion, 19th Portable Hospital, commanded by Capt Bernard Friedenthal M.D. and the 107th Quartermaster Company, commanded by Lt. Col. Henry A. Geerds, left Kalamazoo over several days on foot, assisted by several hundred native porters and guides. So rough was the journey ahead that they became the only Americans to trek over 9,100 feet (2,800 m) divide over the extremely rugged Owen Stanley Mountains on foot.

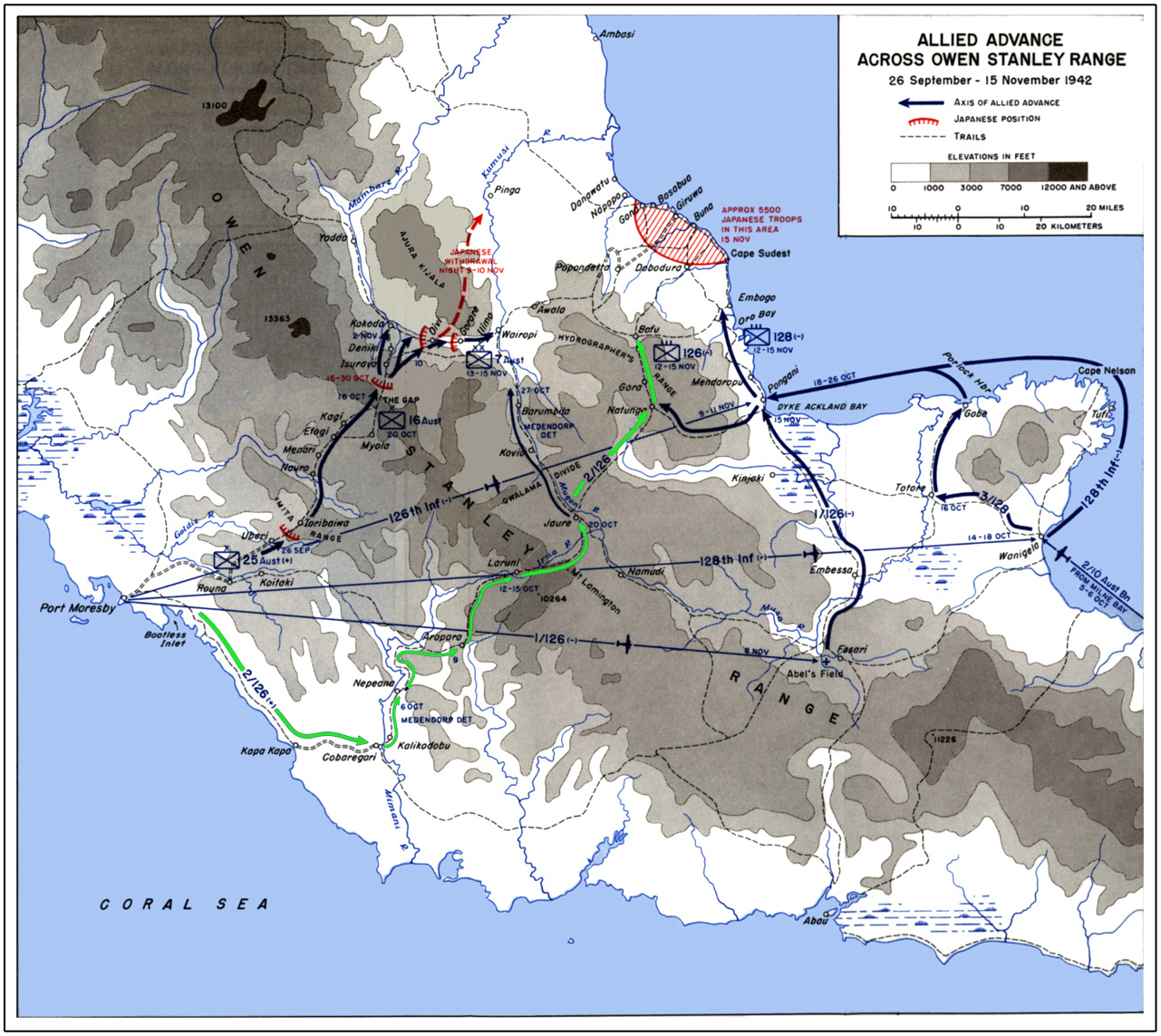
Allied advance over the Owen Stanley Range via the Kapa Kapa Trail 26 September - 15 November 1942

They were charged with making an extremely difficult trek inland over the Kapa Kapa Trail toward Jaure, where they were to flank the Japanese on the Kokoda Trail. The total distance over the mountains to the Japanese positions was over 130 miles (210 km), and most of the trail was barely a goat path. The men carried only six days rations, expecting to be resupplied en route. The food however was very poor, including hardtack, rice and bully beef, some of which had become rancid and sickening many men. They had leather toilet seats but no machetes, insect repellent, waterproof containers for medicine or personal effects, and it rained heavily every day. When they received quinine pills, water chlorination tablets, vitamin pills, or salt tablets, usually a few days supply, they began to disintegrate almost as soon as the men put them in their pockets or packs.

It was grueling march on a line paralleling the Kokoda Trail, and the men who made it will remember it forever as a living, wide-awake nightmare. For forty-two days they climbed, scrambled, clawed and suffered—many times cutting their own trail through some of the most awesome territory in the world.

The Battalion was commanded by LTC Henry A. Geerds, who suffered multiple heart attacks two days out. The Battalion was then taken over by Major Garnet J. Burlingame, Ann Arbor, Michigan. Burlingame led his men through eerie ghost forests where phosphorus lighted the trees and they sank to their knees in mud. It didn't take them long to decide that there were items in their full-field equipment they could do without. They cut their blankets in half. They dumped their mosquito nettings at the side of the trail. Though it rained unrelentingly every afternoon and night they discarded their rain coats. Each man kept one uniform—the one he had on. They abandoned their shaving equipment and other toilet articles, keeping only their tooth brushes—with which they tried to keep their rifles clean.

Day after day the Battalion plodded through some of the worst and wildest jungle in the world. They went through waist-deep streams and along trails that were waist-deep channels of mud. Half the time they could not see the sky—only matted leaves and vines. It would take five or six hours to go a mile, edging along cliff walls, hanging on to vines, up and down, up and down. Men got weaker and began to lag back.... There wasn't any way of evacuating to the rear. Everyone was driven on by the fear of being left behind.

Their bones ached and dysentery had hit almost every man. They were filthy and caked with mud, and washed themselves only when they happened to be crossing a river. They climbed to 8,000 feet (2,400 m), to the top of the gap through which they stumbled over the Owen Stanleys. It took them seven hours to crawl the last 2,000 feet (610 m) They couldn't march for more than 15 minutes without lying down and resting.

=== Difficult terrain ===
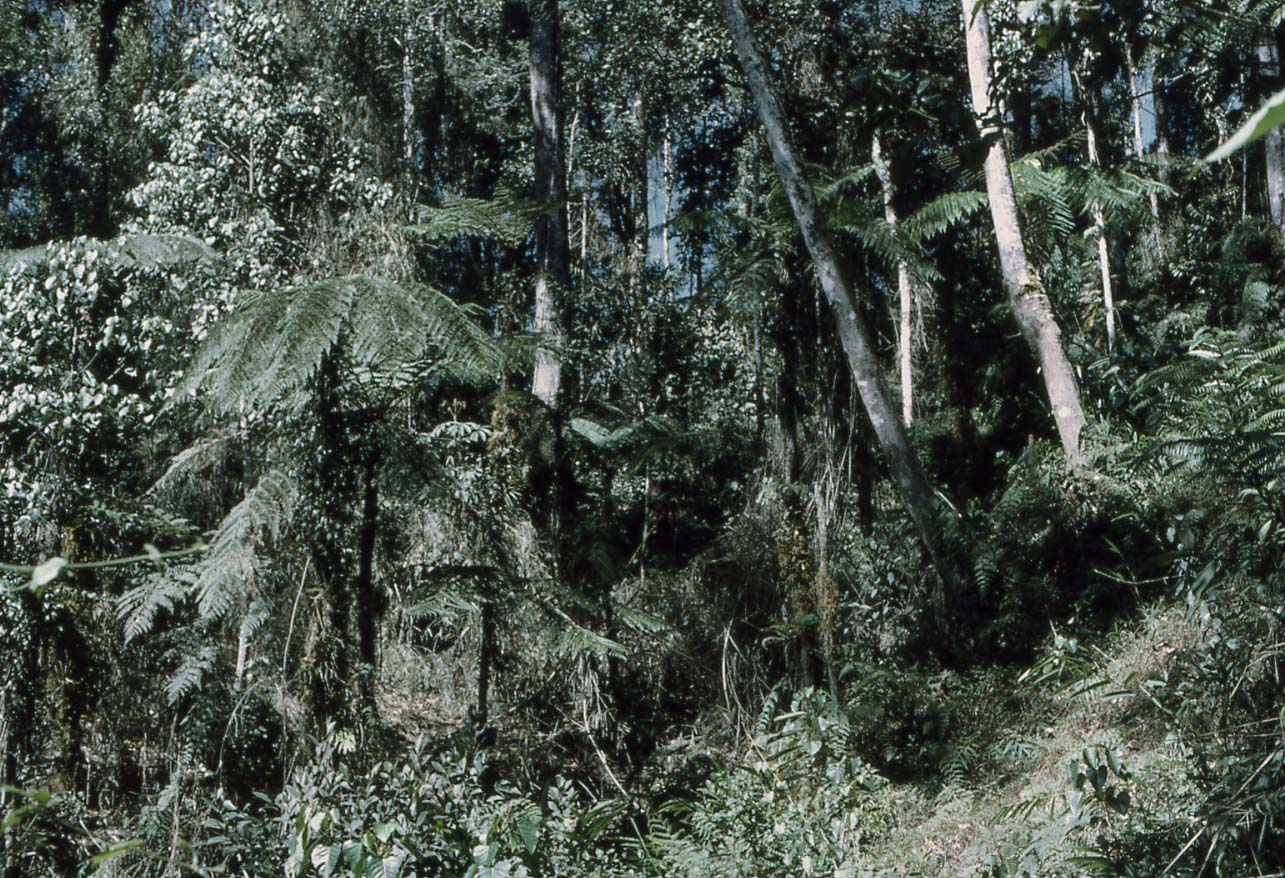
Dense forest jungle on mountain spurs of the Owen Stanley Range, Bulldog Track, Papua New Guinea

The men found themselves utterly unprepared for the extremely harsh conditions found in the jungle. The Kapa Kapa trail across the Owen Stanley divide was a "dank and eerie place, rougher and more precipitous" than the Kokoda Track on which the Australians and Japanese were then fighting. Chiggers, fleas, sand flies, leeches, and mosquitoes found every inch of exposed skin. They rapidly began to discard anything they didn't absolutely need, including raincoats, helmets, blankets, even ammunition. Members of the mortar company first left their base plates behind, then the tubes, and finally all of the ammunition.

Immense ridges, or "razorbacks," followed each other in succession like the teeth of a saw. As a rule, the only way the troops could get up these ridges, which were steeper than along the Kokoda Trail, was either on hands and knees, or by cutting steps into them with ax and machete. To rest, the men simply leaned forward, holding on to vines and roots in order to keep themselves from slipping down the mountainside.

One group lost its footing and slid 2,000 feet (610 m) downhill in 40 minutes; it took them eight hours to climb back to where they began.

=== Nicknamed The Ghost Battalion ===
Their field craft showed the lack of training, and malaria, dengue fever, bush typhus, amoebic dysentery, bacillary, along with jungle rot, dobie itch, trench foot, athlete's foot and ringworm quickly struck hundreds of men. Their rate of advance compared to the Australian soldiers was considerably slower. It rained hard every afternoon at about three o'clock, and beginning on 15 October they were drenched by five days of steady rain. Constant tropical downpours, searing heat, and dripping humidity left the soldiers constantly wet. At night in the higher altitudes, temperatures dropped rapidly, leaving the men chilled.

Lead elements of the 126th finally crossed the 9,100 ft (2,800 m) pass in the extremely rugged Owen Stanley Mountains near 3,080-metre-high (10,100 ft) Mount Obree, which they nicknamed Ghost Mountain. To avoid becoming illegal combatants in the League of Nations mandate trust territory of New Guinea, the remaining Australian Papuan native porters would not cross the border at the top of the range. The Americans were left to shoulder their own packs weighing up to 36 kilograms (79 lb). They finally crossed the last ridge and after 29 days the initial units reached Jaure on 25 October 1942. Captain Boice, scouting ahead, had reached this village on 4 October.

They began to depart from Jaure on 28 October. Captain Boice could not find a single good place for aircraft to drop supplies between Jaure and Natunga in the steep foothills northeast of Jaure, leading to the Buna area. During their five-day trek to Natunga, most of the troops' rations dropped between those two points were lost. The men were reduced to eating bananas and papayas or whatever else they could find or had gone hungry. They finally reached the Natunga area on 2 November. There, they spent more than a week drawing rations, helmets, boots, and other equipment before pushing on to Gora and Bofu, which they reached on 12 November.

On 20 November 1942, after almost 42 days trekking across exceedingly difficult terrain, including hogback ridges, jungle, and mountainous high-altitude passes, E Company of the 126th was the first to reach Soputa near the front. The remainder of the Battalion trickled in over the next few days. As a result of the extremely difficult march and the decimated ranks of the unit, the battalion earned the nickname of The Ghost Battalion. By the time the troops reached Soputa, they were in such bad shape they weren't fit for combat. Their new commanding officer, Major Herbert Smith said, "They were even lucky to be alive." Smith had replaced Major Garnet J. Burlingame as Battalion Commander due to Burlingame suffering a fractured spine from a fall along the trail. Smith arrived and replaced Burlingame on 30 October 1942, after 2nd Battalion had crossed over the Owen Stanley mountains. No other troops were tasked with making the same trek.

=== 128th airlifted ===
Midway through their march, Cecil Abel, a local missionary arrived in Port Moresby with information that usable airfield sites were available on the far side of the Owen Stanley Range at Fasari in the Musa River valley and at Pongani. By 2 November Blamey persuaded MacArthur to transport the remainder of the 32nd Division by air. In a first for World War II, the rest of the 128th Infantry was flown from Australia to New Guinea, the greatest distance the Army Air Force had airlifted men up to that time. Battery A of the 129th Field Artillery, 32nd Division had been sent to New Guinea, while the remaining batteries remained at Camp Cable in Australia. In another first, the four-gun sections were the first howitzers flown into a war, first landing at Port Moresby. Then one-half of Battery A, 129th Field Artillery, was air-lifted over the Owen Stanley Range to Buna, becoming the first U.S. Army artillery flown into combat in the Pacific in World War II.

== Aftermath ==
The attempt to flank the Japanese failed. The troops never encountered a single Japanese troop on their trek and were unable due to the terrain to offer any support to the Australians on the Kokoda Track. The Australians were by then preparing to attack the Japanese who had retreated all the way to the fortified Buna coast.

By the time the 2/126th Infantry Regiment completed their trek, they were considerably under strength. Seventy percent of the 900 men had contracted malaria. Meanwhile, on 14–18 October, the U.S. 128th Infantry Regiment had been flown from Port Moresby to Wanigela, where they began to hike north the short-distance overland towards Buna. The U.S. 1st Battalion, 126th Infantry Regiment were flown on 8 November to Fasari, where an airfield had been located, and they began moving towards the coast and Pongani. The U.S. 1/126th, 128th, with the Australian 2/10th Battalion engaged the Japanese on 18 November at Buna-Gona. Despite the extremely poor condition of the 2/126th, General MacArthur was desperate for men to put on the line, and after only a week of recuperation, he ordered them to the Buna-Gona to face battle-hardened Japanese troops on 20 November. The division had never received adequate equipment, training, and preparation for the task they were given and were chronically short of basic supplies. Harding requested tanks and artillery support, but MacArthur was persuaded by General Kenney that the Army Air Force could replace the role of artillery. The Battalion soon ran short of weapons, medicine and even food. General Harding was relieved of command after only 13 days because MacArthur thought the men were unwilling to fight.
