= Robert L. Eichelberger =

US Army general (1886–1961)

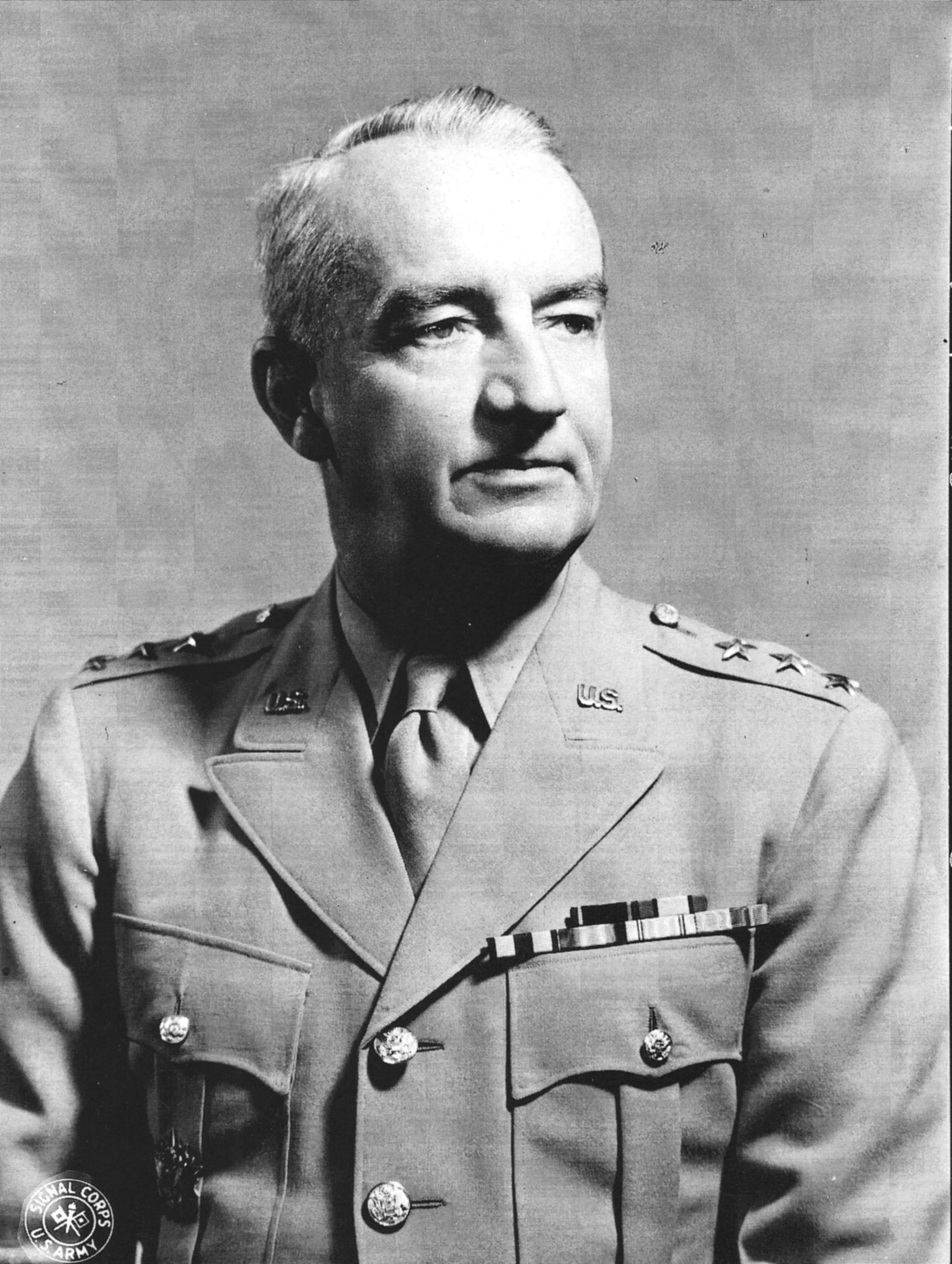
- Eichelberger as Lieutenant General, 1943
- Born: 9 March 1886; Urbana, Ohio, U.S.
- Died: 26 September 1961 (aged 75); Asheville, North Carolina, U.S.
- Military career
- Allegiance: United States
- Branch: United States Army
- Service years: 1909–1948
- Rank: General
- Service number: 0–2624
- Commands: Eighth Army; I Corps; 77th Infantry Division; 30th Infantry
- Conflicts: Border War; World War I; Russian Civil War; Siberian Intervention; World War II; New Guinea campaign; Battle of Buna–Gona; Battle of Hollandia; Battle of Aitape; Battle of Biak; Philippines campaign; Battle of Leyte; Battle of Luzon; Battle of Visayas; Invasion of Palawan; Battle of Mindanao; Occupation of Japan
- Awards: Distinguished Service Cross (2); Army Distinguished Service Medal (4); Navy Distinguished Service Medal; Silver Star (3); Legion of Merit; Bronze Star Medal; Air Medal; Imperial Order of Meiji (Japan); Order of the Sacred Treasure (Japan); Order of the Rising Sun (Japan); Knight Commander of the Order of the British Empire (Australia); Grand Officer of the Legion of Honor (France); Grand Officer Order of Crown (Belgium); Croix de Guerre (Belgium); Grand Officer Order Orange-Nassau (Netherlands); Order of Abdon Calderón (Ecuador); Distinguished Service Star (Philippines); Liberation Medal (Philippines); Legion of Honor (Philippines); Military Order of Italy

Robert Lawrence Eichelberger (9 March 1886 – 26 September 1961) was a general officer in the United States Army who commanded the Eighth United States Army in the Southwest Pacific Area during World War II.

A 1909 graduate of the United States Military Academy at West Point, he saw service in Panama and on the Mexican border before joining the American Expeditionary Force Siberia in 1918. He was awarded the Distinguished Service Cross for repeated acts of bravery in Siberia. After the war, he transferred to the Adjutant General's Corps. He attended the Command and General Staff College and the Army War College, and was Secretary of the War Department General Staff, working for the Chief of Staff of the United States Army, General Douglas MacArthur.

In 1940, Eichelberger became the Superintendent of the United States Military Academy at West Point. He instituted a number of reforms, cutting back activities such as horseback riding and close order drill, and substituting modern combat training, in which cadets participated in military exercises alongside National Guard units. He acquired Stewart Field as a training facility, which gave cadets a chance to qualify as pilots while still at West Point. He became commander of the 77th Infantry Division in March 1942, and I Corps in June.

In August 1942, Eichelberger was abruptly sent to the Southwest Pacific Area, where he led American and Australian troops in the bloody Battle of Buna–Gona. In 1944, he had notable victories at Hollandia and the Battle of Biak. As Commanding General of the newly formed Eighth Army, Eichelberger led the invasion of the Southern Philippines, clearing the islands of Mindoro, Marinduque, Panay, Negros, Cebu, and Bohol. By July 1945, his forces had defeated the Japanese on Mindanao. In August 1945, Eichelberger's Eighth Army began a three-year stint as part of the Occupation of Japan. He retired from the Army at the end of 1948.

== Early life ==
Robert Lawrence Eichelberger was born at Urbana, Ohio on 9 March 1886, the youngest of five children of George Maley Eichelberger, a farmer and lawyer, and Emma Ring Eichelberger. He grew up on the 235-acre (95 ha) family farm that had been established by his grandfather. He graduated from Urbana High School in 1903, and entered Ohio State University, where he joined Phi Gamma Delta fraternity.

In 1904, Eichelberger persuaded his father's former law partner, William R. Warnock, now the congressman for Ohio's 8th congressional district, to appoint him to the United States Military Academy at West Point. He entered West Point in June 1905. His class of 1909 was a distinguished one. Some 28 of them ultimately wore the stars of general officers, including Jacob L. Devers, John C. H. Lee, Edwin F. Harding, George S. Patton and William H. Simpson. Eichelberger was a poor student, as he had been at high school and Ohio State, but did become a cadet lieutenant, and graduated 68th in his class of 103.

Eichelberger was commissioned as a second lieutenant in the 25th Infantry on 11 June 1909, but was transferred to the 10th Infantry at Fort Benjamin Harrison, Indiana, on 22 July. In March 1911, the 10th Infantry was despatched to San Antonio, Texas, where it became part of the Maneuver Division, which was formed to undertake offensive operations during the Border War with Mexico. Then, in September, it was sent to the Panama Canal Zone. It was in Panama that Eichelberger met Emmaline (Em) Gudger, the daughter of Hezekiah A. Gudger, the Chief Justice of the Panama Canal Zone Supreme Court. After a brief courtship, they were married on 3 April 1913.

On returning to the United States in March 1915, Eichelberger was posted to the 22nd Infantry at Fort Porter, New York. It too was sent to the Mexican border, and was based at Douglas, Arizona, where Eichelberger was promoted to first lieutenant on 1 July 1916. In September, he became Professor of Military Science and Tactics at Kemper Military School in Boonville, Missouri.

== World War I and Russian Civil War ==
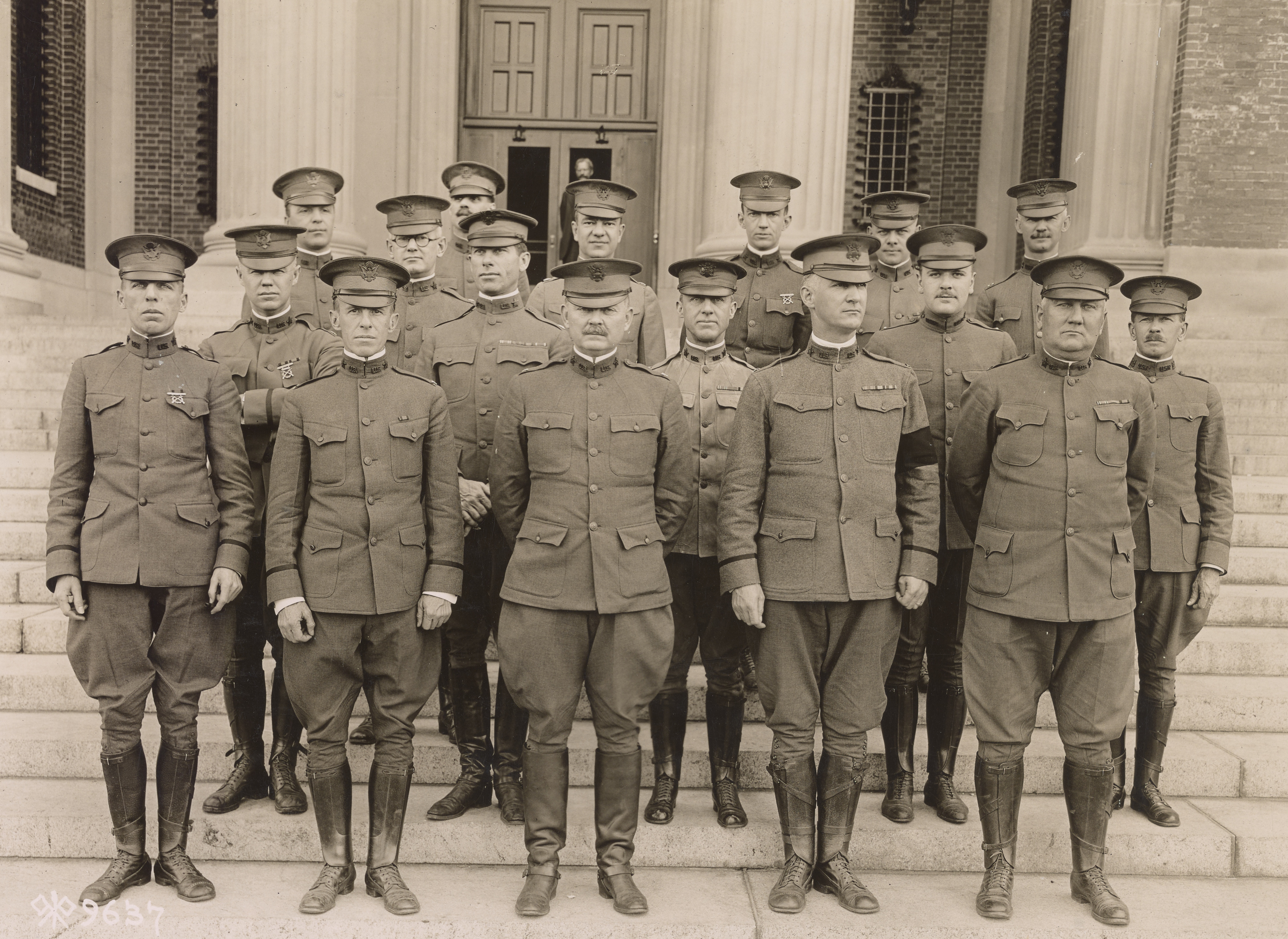
Officers of the War Plans Branch, War Plans Division, General Staff, standing outside the entrance of the Army War College at Washington, D.C., May 1918. Captain Robert L. Eichelberger is standing in the back row, third from the left, between Lieutenant Colonel Daniel I. Sultan (left) and Captain C. C. Stokeley (right)

Following the American entry into World War I in April 1917, Eichelberger was promoted to captain on 15 May. In June he was posted to the 20th Infantry at Fort Douglas, Utah, and commanded a battalion until September, when he was transferred to the newly formed 43rd Infantry at Camp Pike, Arkansas. He was Senior Infantry Instructor at the 3rd Officers' Training Camp at Camp Pike until February 1918, when he was assigned to the War Department General Staff in Washington, D.C., where he became an assistant to Brigadier General William S. Graves, and was promoted to major on 3 June 1918.

In July 1918, Graves was appointed commander of the 8th Division, which was then based at Palo Alto, California, and scheduled to be sent to France in 30 days. Graves took Eichelberger with him, initially as his Assistant Chief of Staff, G-3 (Operations). While he was en route to California, Eichelberger learned from Graves that the 8th Division's destination had changed, and it was now bound for Siberia instead. President Woodrow Wilson had agreed to support the Allied intervention in the Russian Civil War, and Graves would command the American Expeditionary Force Siberia (AEFS). The AEFS departed San Francisco on 15 August, with Eichelberger as its Assistant Chief of Staff, G-2 (Intelligence).

Graves was instructed that his mission was political rather than military, and accordingly he was to "maintain strict neutrality". Eichelberger found himself thrust into a complex political, diplomatic, and military environment. Soon after arriving, he was appointed to the ten-nation Inter-Allied Military Council, which was responsible for Allied strategy. Eichelberger became convinced that America's objectives in Siberia were not necessarily the same as those of her French and British allies, but it was far from clear what they actually were, especially when the State Department and the War Department did not always agree. American policy called for protecting the Trans-Siberian Railway, but this was under the control of Admiral Alexander Kolchak's White Army forces, whom Eichelberger considered to be "murderers" and "cutthroats".

Eichelberger was awarded the Distinguished Service Cross for repeated acts of bravery while assigned to the Expeditionary Force. His citation read:

For extraordinary heroism in action 28 June – 3 July 1919, while serving as assistant chief of staff, G-2, American Expeditionary Forces, Siberia. On 2 July 1919, after the capture, by American troops of Novitskaya, an American platoon detailed to clear hostile patrols from a commanding ridge was halted by enemy enfilading fire, seriously wounding the members of the patrol. Colonel Eichelberger, without regard to his own safety and armed with a rifle, voluntarily covered the withdrawal of the platoon. On 28 June, at the imminent danger of his own life, he entered the partisan lines and effected the release of one American officer and three enlisted men in exchange for a Russian prisoner. On 3 July an American column being fired upon when debouching from a mountain pass, Colonel Eichelberger voluntarily assisted in establishing the firing line, prevented confusion, and, by his total disregard for his own safety, raised the morale of the American forces to a high pitch.

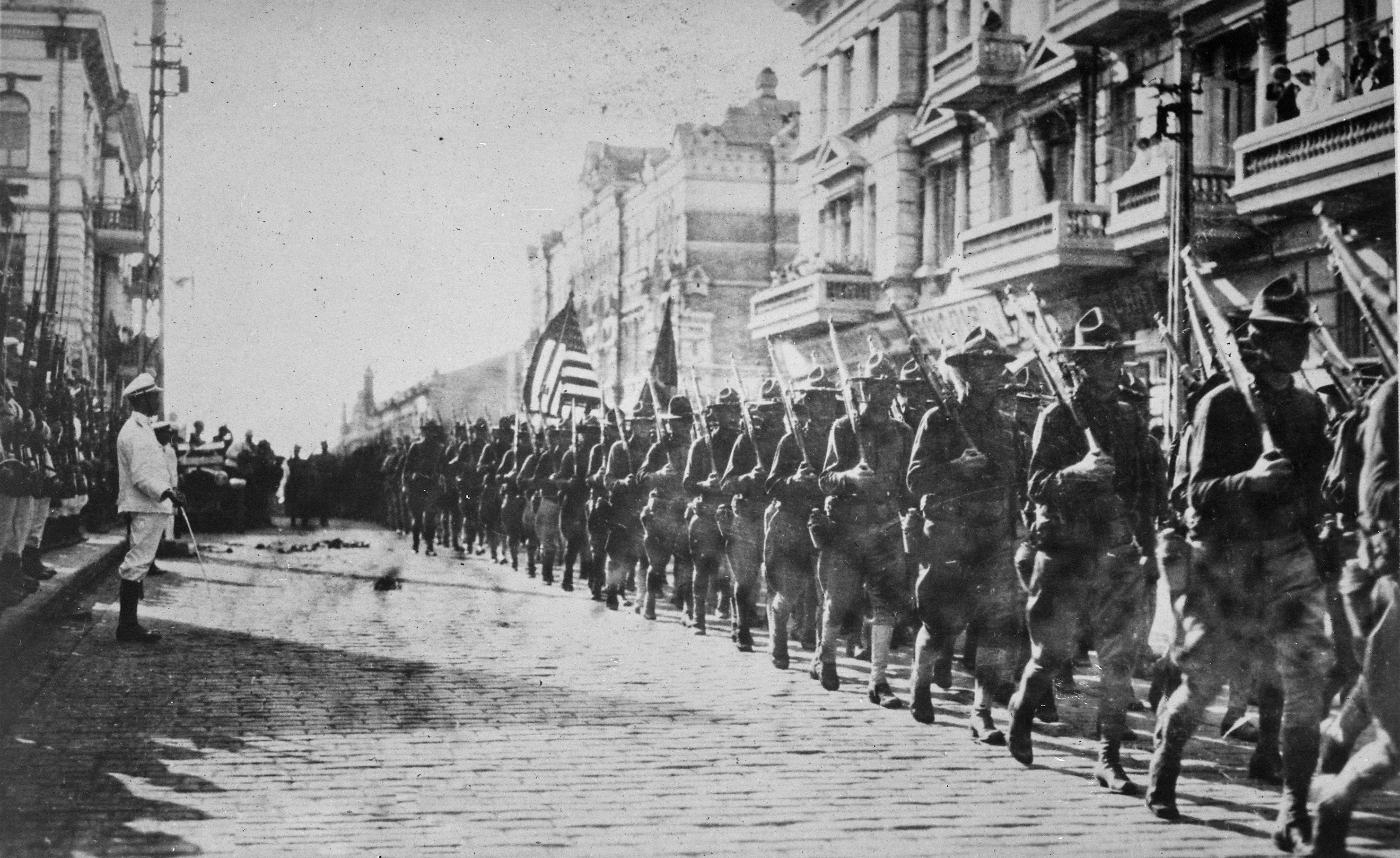
American troops in Vladivostok parading before the building occupied by the staff of the Czecho-Slovaks

For his services in Siberia, Eichelberger was awarded the Army Distinguished Service Medal, and was promoted to lieutenant colonel on 28 March 1919. Graves prevented him from receiving the British Distinguished Service Order and the French Legion of Honor, as had other members of the Inter-Allied Military Council. Eichelberger did, however, receive the Japanese Imperial Order of Meiji, Order of the Sacred Treasure, and Order of the Rising Sun. Siberia gave Eichelberger a chance to observe the Japanese Army at first hand, and he was impressed by what he saw of their training and discipline. He concluded that, if properly led, they would be more than a match for American troops. The AEFS was withdrawn in April 1920.

== Between the wars ==
Instead of returning to the United States following his service in Siberia, Eichelberger became Assistant Chief of Staff, G-2 (Intelligence), of the Philippine Department on 4 May 1920. Like many officers in the aftermath of World War I, he was reduced in rank to his permanent rank of captain on 30 June 1920, but was immediately promoted to major again the next day. Em had joined him in Vladivostok in March 1920, and the two first travelled to Japan before moving on to the Philippines. In March 1921, Eichelberger became head of the Intelligence Mission to China. He established intelligence offices in Peking and Tientsin, and met the President of the Republic of China, Sun Yat-sen. He finally returned to the United States in May 1921, where he was assigned to the Far Eastern Section of the G-2 (Intelligence) Division of the War Department General Staff.

A major disappointment for Eichelberger was his failure to make the General Staff Eligibility List (GSEL). Under the National Defense Act of 1920, only officers on this list could be promoted to brigadier general. Concluding that his prospects for promotion in the infantry were poor, at the urging of the Adjutant General, Major General Robert C. Davis, he transferred to the Adjutant General's Corps on 14 July 1925. He continued to work with the War Department General Staff, but now in the Adjutant General's Office. In April 1925, he was posted to Fort Hayes, Ohio, as Assistant Adjutant General, 5th Corps Area.

Davis had offered to nominate Eichelberger for a place at the Command and General Staff College at Fort Leavenworth. Eichelberger joined 247 other officers there in July 1924. Since the students were seated alphabetically, he sat next to the officer who topped the class, Major Dwight D. Eisenhower. Other students in the class included Joseph Stilwell, Leonard Gerow, and Joseph T. McNarney. Eichelberger graduated as a Distinguished Graduate, one of the top quarter of the class, and stayed on at the college as its Adjutant General. In 1929, he became a student at the Army War College. On graduation, he was posted back to the Adjutant General's Office in Washington, D.C.

In 1931, Eichelberger was sent to West Point as its adjutant. He was promoted to lieutenant colonel on 1 August 1934. In April 1935, he became Secretary of the War Department General Staff, working for the Chief of Staff of the United States Army, General Douglas MacArthur. Eichelberger transferred back to the infantry in July 1937, although he remained Secretary of the War Department General Staff until October 1938, in the rank of colonel from 1 August.

The new Chief of Staff, General Malin Craig offered Eichelberger command of the 29th Infantry, the demonstration regiment based at Fort Benning, Georgia. Eichelberger turned this down, as he had been away from the infantry for many years, and some infantry officers might be jealous. Instead, he accepted command of the 30th Infantry, a less prestigious unit stationed at the Presidio of San Francisco, but there were still officers who resented someone attaining command of a regiment at the age of 52. Before departing, he took a brief course at the Infantry School at Fort Benning to reacquaint himself with the infantry. As part of the 3rd Infantry Division, the 30th Infantry took part in a series of major training exercises over the next two years.

== World War II ==
=== Training in the United States ===
Eichelberger was promoted to brigadier general in October 1940, and the next month received orders to become deputy division commander of the 7th Infantry Division under Stilwell. At the last minute, these orders were changed. Major General Edwin "Pa" Watson interceded with President Franklin Roosevelt to have Eichelberger appointed the Superintendent of the United States Military Academy at West Point. Before taking up the position, Eichelberger met with Craig's successor as Chief of Staff, General George C. Marshall, who warned him that the courses at the Command and General Staff College and Army War College had been drastically shortened in order to meet the needs of the expanding Army, and that West Point would suffer a similar fate unless Eichelberger could make the course more relevant to the Army's immediate needs.

As superintendent, Eichelberger attempted "to bring West Point into the twentieth century" . He cut back activities such as horseback riding and close order drill, and substituted modern combat training, in which cadets participated in military exercises alongside National Guard units. He acquired Stewart Field as a training facility, and required cadets to undergo basic flight training. This gave cadets a chance to qualify as pilots while still at West Point. Yet he also concerned himself with the dismal state of the West Point football team. Through Pa Watson, he was able to persuade the Surgeon General of the United States Army to waive weight restrictions to allow heavier players to be recruited, and hired Earl Blaik to coach the team.

Over time, Marshall came to believe that Eichelberger's talents were wasted at West Point, but he was opposed by Pa Watson, who wanted Eichelberger to remain at the academy. When Marshall told Watson that Eichelberger's chances for promotion to major general were being adversely affected by being denied the chance to command a division, Watson added Eichelberger's name to the top of a promotion list and had the President sign it. In this manner, Eichelberger was promoted to major general in July 1941.

After the United States declaration of war upon Japan in December 1941, Eichelberger applied for a transfer to an active command. He was given the choice of three new divisions, and chose the 77th Infantry Division, which was activated at Fort Jackson, South Carolina, in March 1942. The other two divisions were given to Major Generals Omar Bradley and Henry Terrell, Jr. The three generals and their staffs attended a training course at Fort Leavenworth. For his chief of staff, Eichelberger chose Clovis Byers, an officer who had also attended Ohio State and West Point, and had been a fellow member of the Phi Gamma Delta fraternity.

Eichelberger's period in command of the 77th Infantry Division was brief, for on 18 June 1942 he became commander of I Corps, with Byers as his chief of staff. He was awarded the Legion of Merit for his service with the 77th Infantry Division. I Corps consisted of the 8th, 30th, and 77th Infantry Divisions. Eichelberger was given the initial task of arranging a demonstration for dignitaries including Winston Churchill, Marshall, Henry Stimson, Sir John Dill, and Sir Alan Brooke. The demonstration was judged a success, although the trained eyes of Brooke and Lesley McNair noted flaws. Within days, two of the division commanders were relieved of their commands. Eichelberger was nominated to command American forces in Operation Torch, and he was ordered to conduct training in amphibious warfare with the 3rd, 9th, and 30th Infantry Divisions in Chesapeake Bay in cooperation with Rear Admiral Kent Hewitt.

=== Battle of Buna-Gona ===
On 9 August 1942, his orders were abruptly changed. MacArthur, now Supreme Commander of the Southwest Pacific Area, had requested that a corps headquarters be sent to his command. Major General Robert C. Richardson, Jr., had originally been detailed for the assignment, but as Marshall informed MacArthur, "Richardson's intense feelings regarding service under Australian command made his assignment appear unwise." Eichelberger's I Corps headquarters was ready for overseas service and had training in amphibious warfare, and Eichelberger had experience working with MacArthur, so Marshall selected him for the job instead. Eichelberger was not happy with the assignment, especially when he found out about Richardson, and "knew General MacArthur well enough to know that he was going to be difficult to get along with".

Eichelberger departed for Australia on 20 August with 22 members of his staff in a B-24 Liberator. I Corps controlled the two American divisions in Australia: Major General Forrest Harding's 32nd Infantry Division, based at Camp Cable near Brisbane; and Major General Horace Fuller's 41st Infantry Division at Rockhampton, Queensland, where Eichelberger, who was promoted to lieutenant general on 21 October, decided to establish his I Corps headquarters inside the Criterion Hotel. His I Corps came under the command of Lieutenant General Sir John Lavarack's Australian First Army. On meeting Australian commanders, Eichelberger noted that many of them "had already been in combat with the British in North Africa, and, though they were usually too polite to say so, considered the Americans to be—at best—inexperienced theorists." He was disturbed at the level of training received by the two American divisions. Instead of training for jungle warfare, they were following the same syllabus used in the United States. He warned MacArthur and MacArthur's chief of staff, Major General Richard K. Sutherland, that the divisions could not be expected to meet veteran Japanese troops on equal terms. He decided in September that the 32nd Infantry Division should proceed to New Guinea first, as Camp Cable was inferior to the 41st Infantry Division's camp at Rockhampton.

Eichelberger's fears were realized when the overconfident 32nd Infantry Division suffered a serious reverse in the Battle of Buna-Gona. Harding was confident that he could capture Buna "without too much difficulty", but poor staff work, inaccurate intelligence, inadequate training and, above all, Japanese resistance, frustrated the American efforts. The Americans found themselves confronted by a network of well-sited and expertly prepared Japanese positions, accessible only through a swamp. The Americans' failure damaged their relationship with the Australians and threatened to derail MacArthur's entire campaign. Eichelberger and a small party from I Corps headquarters were hurriedly flown up to Port Moresby in a pair of C-47 Dakotas on 30 November. MacArthur ordered Eichelberger to assume control of the battle at Buna. According to Byers and Eichelberger, MacArthur told him "in a grim voice":

"I'm putting you in command at Buna. Relieve Harding. I am sending you in, Bob, and I want you to remove all officers who won't fight. Relieve regimental and battalion commanders; if necessary, put sergeants in charge of battalions and corporals in charge of companies—anyone who will fight. Time is of the essence; the Japanese may land reinforcements any night."

General MacArthur strode down the breezy veranda again. He said he had reports that American soldiers were throwing away their weapons and running from the enemy. Then he stopped short and spoke with emphasis. He wanted no misunderstandings about my assignment.

"Bob," he said, "I want you to take Buna, or not come back alive." He paused a moment, and then, without looking at Byers, pointed a finger. "And that goes for your chief of staff, too."

The next day, Eichelberger's party was flown to Dobodura, where he assumed command of US troops in the Buna area. He relieved Harding, and replaced him with the division's artillery commander, Brigadier General Albert W. Waldron. He relieved other officers too, appointing a 26-year-old captain to command a battalion. Some of the 32nd Infantry Division's officers privately denounced Eichelberger as ruthless and "Prussian". He set an example by moving among the troops on the front lines, sharing their hardships and danger. Despite the risk, he purposefully wore his three silver stars while at the front, even though he knew Japanese snipers targeted officers, because he wanted his troops to know their commander was present. After the snipers seriously wounded Waldron in the shoulder, Eichelberger appointed Byers to command the 32nd Infantry Division, but he too was wounded on 16 December. This left Eichelberger as the only American general in the forward area, and he assumed personal command of the division. He was not the most senior general present though; he served under the command of Australian Lieutenant General Edmund Herring, whom he referred to in letters to Em as "my grand colleague".

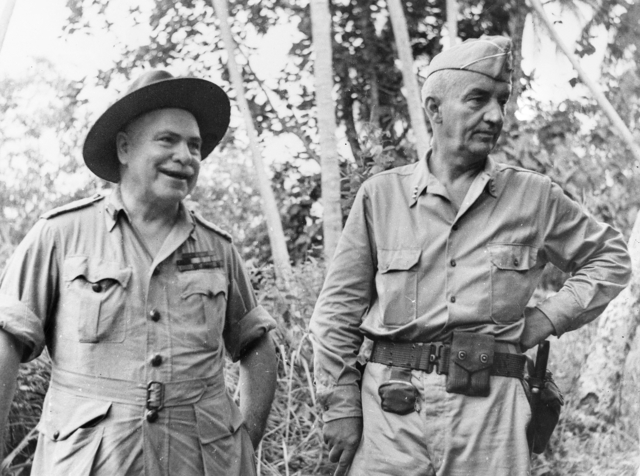
Sir Thomas Blamey and Robert L. Eichelberger.

After the fall of Buna, Eichelberger was placed in command of the Allied force assembled to reduce the remaining Japanese positions around Sanananda, with Australian Major General Frank Berryman as his chief of staff. The battle continued until 22 January 1943. The price of victory at Buna was high. The 32nd Division lost 707 dead and 1,680 wounded; another 8,286 were hospitalized with tropical diseases, principally malaria. Its men referred to their division cemetery as "Eichelberger Square". On 24 January, Eichelberger flew back to Port Moresby where he was warmly welcomed by Herring. The next day he flew back to Rockhampton. For the battle, Eichelberger received the Distinguished Service Cross along with ten other generals, all of whom received the same citation. Some, like Herring, had served at the front; others, like Sutherland, had not. Eichelberger was also created an honorary Knight Commander of the Order of the British Empire. Byers recommended Eichelberger for the Medal of Honor but the nomination was disapproved by MacArthur. Another officer on Eichelberger's staff, Colonel Gordon B. Rogers then submitted the recommendation directly to the War Department. MacArthur informed the War Department that "Among many outside the immediate staff of this officer, there was criticism of his conduct of operations which while not detracting from his personal gallantry led to grave considerations at one time of his relief from command."

=== New Guinea Campaign ===
In February 1943, Lieutenant General Walter Krueger's Sixth United States Army headquarters arrived in Australia. Since Sixth Army would do all the planning, and there was as yet little scope for corps-sized operations, Eichelberger found himself with a training role, preparing the 24th Infantry Division, which had arrived from Hawaii, and the 32nd and 41st Infantry Divisions, which had returned from Papua, for future missions. The War Department asked in May 1943 if Eichelberger could be released to command the First United States Army, but MacArthur would not release him. Later, it asked if he could be released to command the Ninth United States Army, but this was also refused, and this job went to Eichelberger's West Point classmate William H. Simpson. Instead, he was given responsibility for Eleanor Roosevelt's visit to Australia in September 1943. She visited Sydney Melbourne and Rockhampton, and had dinner with the Governor General of Australia, Lord Gowrie, and the Prime Minister of Australia, John Curtin, in Canberra.

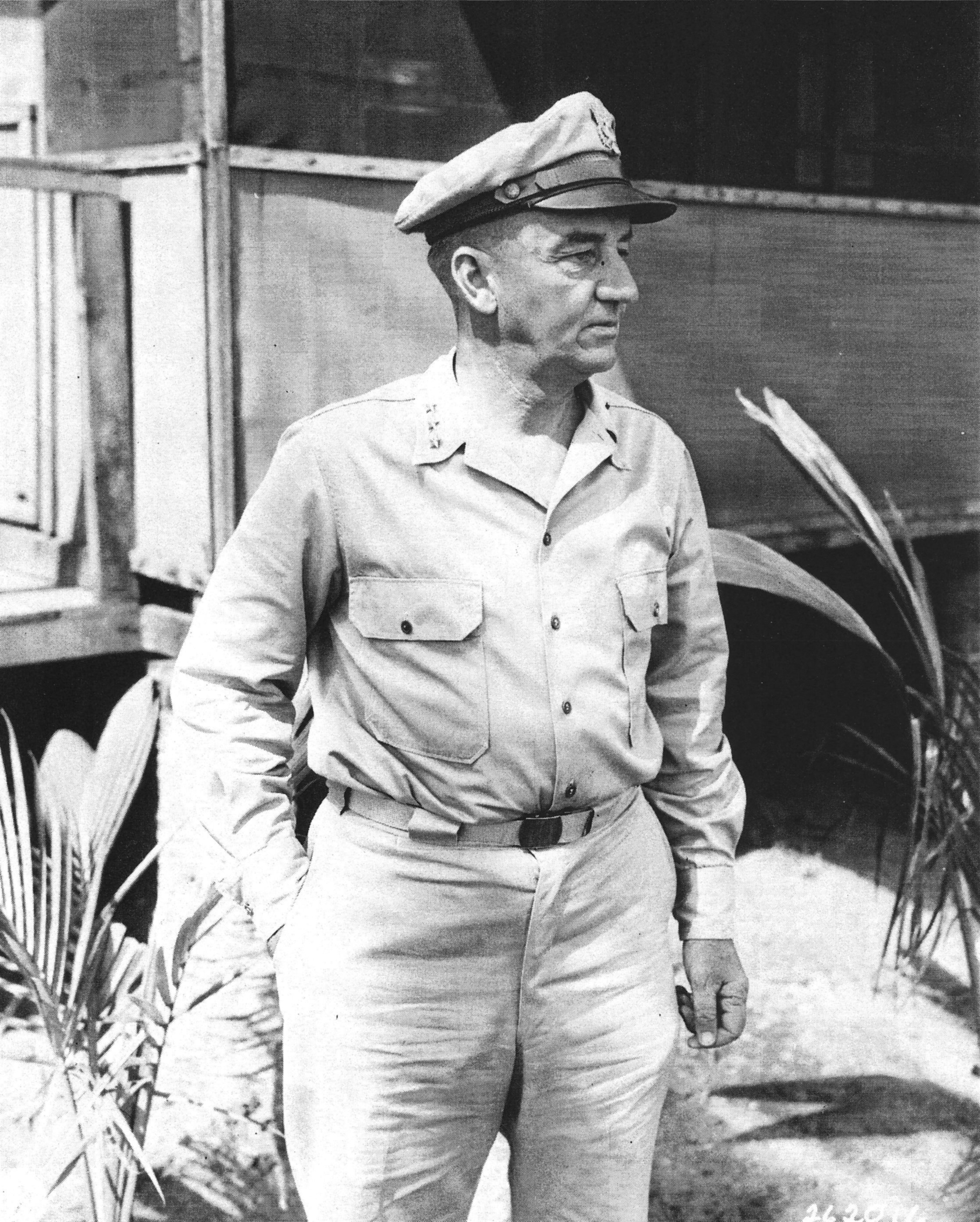
Eichelberger in May 1944.

In January 1944, Eichelberger was informed that he would be in charge of the next operation, a landing at Hansa Bay with the 24th and 41st Infantry Divisions. However, in March this was cancelled in favor of Operation Reckless, a landing by the same force at Hollandia. The operation meant leapfrogging the Japanese defenses at Hansa Bay, but was risky because it was outside the range of land-based air cover. Cover was instead provided by aircraft carriers of the United States Pacific Fleet, but this meant that the operation had to adhere to a strict timetable. Hoping to avoid a repeat of Buna, Eichelberger meticulously planned the operation, and implemented a thorough training program that emphasized physical fitness, individual initiative, small unit tactics, and amphibious warfare. The operation went well, mainly because surprise was achieved and few Japanese were present in the area. However, poor topographical intelligence led to an inability to clear some beaches due to their being backed by swamps. Supplies piled up on the beaches, with fuel and ammunition being stored together in some instances. On 23 April a single Japanese plane ignited a fuel dump, which caused a fire that resulted in 124 casualties and the loss of 60 per cent of the ammunition stockpile. An appalled Krueger felt that Eichelberger had been let down by his staff, and offered to transfer Byers to an assistant division commander's post, but Eichelberger turned down the offer.

In June 1944, Eichelberger was summoned to Sixth Army headquarters by Krueger. The Battle of Biak, where the 41st Infantry Division had landed in May, was going badly, and the airfields that MacArthur had promised would be available to support the Battle of Saipan were not in American hands. Eichelberger found that the Japanese, who were present in larger numbers than originally reported, were ensconced in caves overlooking the airfield sites. While the Americans were better trained and equipped than at Buna, so too were the Japanese, who employed their new tactics of avoiding costly counterattacks and exacting the maximum toll for ground gained. After seeing the situation for himself, Eichelberger concluded that Fuller's 41st Infantry Division had not done too badly. Nonetheless, as at Buna, Eichelberger relieved a number of officers that he felt were not performing as the battle ground on. His orders were to supersede Fuller as task force commander rather than relieve him as division commander, but Fuller requested his own relief, and Krueger obliged him. On Eichelberger's recommendation, Fuller was replaced by Brigadier General Jens A. Doe. Krueger was unimpressed with Eichelberger's performance on Biak, concluding that Eichelberger's tactics were unimaginative, and no better than Fuller's, and may have delayed rather than expedited the capture of the island. On the other hand, MacArthur thought sufficiently highly of Eichelberger's performance to award him the Silver Star.

=== Philippines Campaign ===
While still on Biak, Eichelberger learned that MacArthur had selected him to command the newly formed Eighth United States Army, which arrived at Hollandia in August 1944. Eichelberger took two officers with him from I Corps: Byers and Colonel Frank S. Bowen, his G-3. The Eighth Army assumed control of operations on Leyte Island from Sixth Army on 26 December, the day after MacArthur and Krueger announced that organized resistance there had ended. The troops there included Eichelberger's old command, the 77th Infantry Division. In two months, Sixth Army had killed over 55,000 Japanese soldiers on Leyte, and estimated that only 5,000 remained alive on the island. By 8 May 1945, the Eighth Army had killed over 24,000 more.

In January, the Eighth Army entered combat on Luzon, landing Major General Charles P. Hall's XI Corps on 29 January near San Antonio and Major General Joseph M. Swing's 11th Airborne Division at Nasugbu, Batangas two days later. Combining with Sixth Army, the Eighth Army enveloped Manila in a great pincer movement. Eichelberger assumed personal command of the operation, which involved an advance on Manila by the lightly equipped 11th Airborne Division. The audacious advance made rapid progress until it was halted by well-prepared positions on the outskirts of Manila. MacArthur awarded Eichelberger another Silver Star.

Eighth Army's final operation of the war was that of clearing out the southern Philippines, including the major island of Mindanao, an effort that occupied the soldiers of the Eighth Army for the rest of the war. In six weeks, the Eighth Army conducted 14 major and 24 minor amphibious operations, clearing Mindoro, Marinduque, Panay, Negros, Cebu, and Bohol. In August 1945, Eichelberger's Eighth Army became part of the Occupation of Japan. In the one instance when the Japanese formed a self-help vigilante guard to protect women from rape by off-duty GIs, the Eighth Army ordered armoured vehicles in battle array into the streets and arrested the leaders, and the leaders received long prison terms. The only source for this account is Eichelberger's diary, which does not mention any sex crimes but does mention the beatings of several GIs.

He was awarded an oak leaf cluster to his Distinguished Service Medal for his services as commander of I Corps, a second for his command of Eighth Army in the Philippines, and a third for the occupation of Japan. He also received the Navy Distinguished Service Medal, two oak leaf clusters to his Silver Star Medal, the Bronze Star Medal, and the Air Medal. He also received a number of foreign awards, including Grand Officer of the Order of Orange Nassau with swords from the Netherlands, Grand Officer of the Legion of Honour from France, Grand Officer of the Order of the Crown and the Croix de Guerre with palm from Belgium, the Order of Abdon Calderón from Ecuador, the Distinguished Service Star, Liberation Medal, and Legion of Honor from the Philippines, and Grand Officer of the Military Order of Italy.

== Retirement and death ==
After nearly 40 years of service, Eichelberger retired with the rank of lieutenant general on 31 December 1948. In 1950, he moved to Asheville, North Carolina, where he lived with his wife Em for the rest of his life. He suffered from a number of health problems, including hypertension and diabetes, and had his gall bladder removed. His name appeared in a series of articles for the Saturday Evening Post on his campaigns in the Southwest Pacific, actually written by ghostwriter Milton MacKaye. They subsequently expanded the articles into a book, Our Jungle Road to Tokyo, which one reviewer described as "a straightforward and modest account of the campaigns of the Army ground forces from the Buna operation to the Philippines and victory." The book sold reasonably well, and Harry Truman and Omar Bradley requested autographed copies. In 1951 he traveled to Hollywood, where he served as technical consultant on Francis Goes to West Point (1952) and The Day the Band Played (1952), but he was not altogether happy with the results. He turned his hand to writing articles about the Far East for Newsweek, but gave this away in 1954. He then worked on the lecture circuit, giving speeches about his experiences, but gave this up too in 1955. He campaigned for Richard Nixon in 1960.

The United States Congress, in recognition of his service, promoted Eichelberger, along with a number of other officers who had commanded armies or similar higher formations, to general in 1954. He was distressed that Harding and Fuller were still hurt and angry with him over being relieved of their commands, something he felt was really MacArthur's fault. In turn, Eichelberger never forgave Krueger or Sutherland for real or imagined slights. When Sutherland tried to talk, Eichelberger refused to speak to him. Eventually, Eichelberger decided to write a tell-all book that "would destroy the MacArthur myth forever". For this purpose, he gave his papers to Duke University. Jay Luuvas, a historian at Allegheny College, published his letters in 1972 as Dear Miss Em: General Eichelberger's War in the Pacific 1942–1945. However, Eichelberger maintained his warm wartime relationship with Herring. Herring and his wife Mary stayed with the Eichelbergers in Asheville in 1953, and they exchanged regular letters. Eichelberger underwent exploratory prostate surgery in Asheville on 25 September 1961. Complications set in and he died from pneumonia the following day. He was buried with full military honors in Arlington National Cemetery.

== Military decorations and medals ==
=== United States awards ===
Distinguished Service Cross with oak leaf cluster
Army Distinguished Service Medal with three oak leaf clusters
Navy Distinguished Service Medal
Silver Star with two oak leaf clusters
Legion of Merit
Bronze Star Medal
Air Medal
Mexican Border Service Medal
Victory Medal
American Defense Service Medal
Asiatic-Pacific Campaign Medal
World War II Victory Medal
Army of Occupation Medal

Source: Inventory of the Robert L. Eichelberger Papers, 1728–1998

=== Foreign awards ===
Knight Commander of the Order of the British Empire, Australia
Companion of the Distinguished Service Order, United Kingdom
Grand Officer of the Order of Orange Nassau with swords, Netherlands
Grand Officer of the Legion of Honor, France
Order of the Rising Sun, Japan
Order of the Sacred Treasure, Japan
Grand Officer Order of the Crown, Belgium
Grand Officer Croix de Guerre with palm, Belgium
First Class Order of Abdon Calderón, Ecuador
Distinguished Service Star, Philippines
Liberation Medal, Philippines
Legion of Honor, Philippines
Grand Officer of the Military Order of Italy, Italy

Source: Inventory of the Robert L. Eichelberger Papers, 1728–1998

== Dates of rank ==
Insignia	Rank	Component	Date	Reference
No pin insignia in 1909	Second Lieutenant	Regular Army	11 June 1909	
	First Lieutenant	Regular Army	1 July 1916	
	Captain	Regular Army	15 May 1917	
	Major	(temporary)	3 June 1918	
	Lieutenant Colonel	(temporary)	28 March 1919	
	Reverted to permanent rank of Captain	Regular Army	30 June 1920	
	Major	Regular Army	1 July 1920	
	Lieutenant Colonel	Regular Army	1 August 1934	
	Colonel	Regular Army	1 August 1938	
	Brigadier General	Army of the United States	1 October 1940	
	Major General	Army of the United States	10 July 1941	
	Lieutenant General	Army of the United States	21 October 1942	
	Brigadier General	Regular Army	1 September 1943	
	Major General	Regular Army	4 October 1944	
	Lieutenant General	Regular Army, Retired	31 December 1948	
	General	Army of the United States, Retired	19 July 1954	

== Notes ==
Military offices
Preceded by Jay L. Benedict	Superintendent of the United States Military Academy; 1940–1942	Succeeded by Francis B. Wilby
New command	Commanding General 77th Infantry Division; March–June 1942	Succeeded by Roscoe B. Woodruff
Preceded by Charles F. Thompson	Commanding General I Corps; 1942–1944	Succeeded by Innis P. Swift
New command	Commanding General Eighth Army; 1944–1948	Succeeded by Walton Walker
