= Jeffrey (surname) =

Jeffrey is an English language surname.

Notable persons with this surname include:

- Alan Jeffrey (born 1963), Irish cricketer
- Alexander Jeffrey (1806–1874), Scottish solicitor and historian
- Alick Jeffrey (1939–2000), English footballer
- Anthony Jeffrey (born 1995), English footballer for Dulwich Hamlet
- Bernie Jeffrey (1933–2021), Australian rules footballer for South Melbourne
- Betty Jeffrey (Agnes Betty Jeffrey 1908–2000), Australian WWII nurse and POW
- Bill Jeffrey (born 1948), British civil servant
- Billy Jeffrey (born 1956), Scottish footballer for Oxford United
- Bobby Jeffrey (born 1942), Scottish footballer
- Carol Jeffrey (1898–1998), English psychotherapist
- Chantel Jeffrey (born 2001), Canadian swimmer
- Charles Jeffrey (disambiguation), several people

- Charles Jeffrey (footballer) (died 1915), Scottish footballer with Abercorn
- Charles Jeffrey (fashion designer) (born 1990), Scottish fashion designer
- Charles Jeffrey (botanist) (1934–2022), British botanist

- Chris Jeffrey (born 1988), Canadian curler from Halifax, Nova Scotia
- Christina Jeffrey American political scientist and historian
- David Lyle Jeffrey (born 1941), Canadian-American scholar of literature and religion
- Dustin Jeffrey (born 1988), Canadian ice hockey center in NHL
- E. C. Jeffrey, Edward Charles Jeffrey (1866–1952), Canadian-American botanist
- El Jeffrey (born 1974), merengue artist from Dominican Republic
- Epule Jeffrey (born 1983), actor from Cameroon
- Francis Jeffrey, Lord Jeffrey (1773–1850), Scottish judge and literary critic
- George Jeffrey (1916–1979), Scottish footballer with Tottenham Hotspur
- George Jeffrey (wool expert) (1853–1942), in South Australia
- George Johnstone Jeffrey, Church of Scotland minister, Moderator in 1952
- Grant Jeffrey (1948–2012), Canadian Bible scholar and teacher
- Grezelder Jeffrey politician in Malawi
- Harry P. Jeffrey (1901–1997), American attorney and Ohio politician
- Herbert Jeffrey Herb Jeffries (1913–2014), American actor and jazz baritone
- Hester C. Jeffrey (née Whitehurst c. 1842–1934), American activist, suffragist and community organizer
- Ian Jeffrey, English historian of photography
- J. J. Jeffrey (1940–2024) American radio executive and rock-and-roll DJ
- Jack Jeffery (born 1989), English footballer for West Ham United
- James Jeffrey (disambiguation)

- James Franklin Jeffrey (born 1946), American diplomat
- James S. Jeffrey (1904–1989), Scottish surgeon

- Jared Jeffrey (born 1990), American soccer player
- Jay Jeffrey American college athlete and football coach
- Joel Jeffrey (born 2002), Australian rules footballer with Gold Coast
- John Jeffrey (disambiguation)

- John Jeffrey (born 1959), Scottish rugby union player
- John Jeffrey (botanist) (1826–1854), Scottish plant-hunter
- John Jeffrey (judge), MP for Sussex, East Grinstead and Clitheroe
- John Jeffrey (civil servant) (1872–1947), Permanent Under-Secretary of State for Scotland

- Joyleen Jeffrey (born 1989), Paralympic sprinter from Papua New Guinea
- Julie Roy Jeffrey American history professor at Goucher College
- Keith Jeffrey (born 1963), Trinidadian football manager
- Kevin Jeffrey (born 1974), Trinidad and Tobago (soccer) footballer
- Larry Jeffrey (1940–2022), Canadian ice hockey player
- Lauren Jeffrey (born 1960), British cross-country skier
- Linda Jeffrey née Rooney (born c. 1958), Ontario politician
- Lisa Jeffrey, professor of mathematics at the University of Toronto
- Margaret Jeffrey née Hines (1896–1977), Australian police sergeant
- Mark Jeffrey (c. 1825–1894), English convict in Australia
- Mark Jeffrey (author), American author of Max Quick series
- Mark Jeffrey (tennis) (born 1960s), Australian player
- Mary Hayley Jeffrey née Wilkes (1728–1808), English businesswoman
- Michael Jeffrey (born 1971), English footballer
- Mildred Jeffrey (1910–2004), American political activist
- Neal Jeffrey (born 1953), American footballer in NFL
- Neil Jeffrey (1916–2005), Australian rules footballer with North Melbourne
- Pansy Jeffrey, founder of Pepper Pot Centre
- Patrick Jeffrey (1965), American platform diver
- Paul Jeffrey (1933–2015), American jazz tenor saxophonist
- Percy Shaw Jeffrey (1862–1952), English schoolmaster and author
- Peter Jeffrey (disambiguation)

- Peter Jeffrey (1929–1999), English actor
- Peter Jeffrey (RAAF officer) (1913–1997), Australian fighter ace
- Peter Jeffrey (badminton) (born 1975), English player

- Railey Jeffrey (1945–2020), Malaysian politician
- Raynauth Jeffrey (born 1994), Guyanese cyclist
- Rhi Jeffrey (born 1986), American Olympic swimmer
- Richard Jeffrey (disambiguation)

- Richard Jeffrey (1926–2002), American philosopher and probability theorist
- Richard Jeffrey (bobsleigh) (1917–1953), British bobsledder

- Robert Jeffrey (1934–2004), Canadian singer and actor
- Robin Jeffrey history professor from Canada in Australia
- Robin Jeffrey (businessman) (1939–2018), Scottish engineer and executive
- Ronica Jeffrey (born 1983) American women's boxing champion
- Rosa Vertner Jeffrey, née Griffith (1828–1894), American poet and novelist
- Russell Jeffrey (born 1966), Australian rules footballer with St Kilda
- Sarah Jeffrey Canadian oboist and teacher
- Shirley Jeffrey (1930–2014), Australian marine biologist
- Tasso Jeffrey (born 1998), Vanuatu soccer player in Australia
- Terry Mike Jeffrey American singer, songwriter, musician and actor
- Thomas Jeffrey (c. 1791–1826), convict bushranger and murderer in Australia
- Thomas N. Jeffrey (1782–1847), colonial official and politician in Nova Scotia
- Tom Jeffrey (born 1938), Australian film and television producer and director
- William Jeffrey (disambiguation)

- William A. Jeffrey, American astronomer
- William Jeffrey (cricketer) (1950–1993), Guyanese cricket player and coach
- William Jeffrey (footballer) (1866–1932), English footballer with Burnley, Arsenal and Southampton
- William Jeffrey (American soccer) (1892–1966), head coach
- William Jeffrey (Tsimshian chief) (born 1899), First Nations activist and carver
- William Jeffrey, pseudonym of writer Bill Pronzini

- Winifred Jeffrey (1920–2019), English athlete

== See also ==
- Jeffrey (given name)
- Jeffrey (disambiguation)
- Geoffrey (disambiguation)
- Geoff (disambiguation)
- Jeff (disambiguation)
