= Jefferies (disambiguation) =

Jefferies is a surname.

Jeffries may also refer to:

- Jefferies Group, global investment bank and institutional securities firm
- Jefferies tube, fictional machinery-access mechanism in Star Trek live-action follow-ons

== See also ==
- Jeffries, a surname
- Jeffreys (disambiguation)
- Jeffery (disambiguation)
- Jeffrey (disambiguation)
