= Jeffrey =

Jeffrey may refer to:

== People ==
- Jeffrey (given name), a male given name in English
- Jeffrey (surname), a surname from English

== Places ==
- Jeffrey's, Newfoundland and Labrador, Canada
- Jeffrey City, Wyoming, United States
- Jeffrey Street, Sydney, Australia
- Jeffreys Bay, Western Cape, South Africa

== Art and entertainment ==
- Jeffrey (play), a 1992 off-Broadway play by Paul Rudnick
- Jeffrey (1995 film), a 1995 film by Paul Rudnick, based on Rudnick's play of the same name
- Jeffrey (2016 film), a 2016 Dominican Republic documentary film
- Jeffrey's sketch, a sketch on American TV show Saturday Night Live
- Nurse Jeffrey, a spin-off miniseries from the American medical drama series House, MD

== See also ==
- Geoffrey (disambiguation)
- Geoff (disambiguation)
- Jeff (disambiguation)
- Jeff, a given name (and list of people with the name)
- Jeffers
- Jeffery (disambiguation)
- Jeffreys
- Jeffries
