= Jeffries =

Jeffries /ˈdʒɛfriz/ is a surname. Notable people with the surname include:

- Adam Jeffries (born 1976), American actor
- Ben Jeffries (born 1980), Australian rugby league footballer
- Bill Jeffries (born 1945), former New Zealand politician
- Chad Jeffries (born 1992), American football player
- Charles Jeffries (1864–1936), British Salvation Army officer
- Charles Adams Jeffries (1869–1931), Australian journalist
- Chris Jeffries (born 1978), Canadian cross-country skier
- Clarence Smith Jeffries (1894–1917), Australian Victoria Cross recipient
- Darren Jeffries (born 1982), British actor
- Dean Jeffries (1933–2013), American stunt performer and coordinator
- Derek Jeffries (born 1951), English former footballer
- D. J. Jeffries (born 1999), American basketball player
- Donald Jeffries (1941–2011), British virgilist and academic
- Edward Jeffries (1900–1950), Mayor of Detroit, Michigan (1940–48)
- Fran Jeffries (1937–2016), American singer, actress and model
- Glenn Jeffries (born 1961), West Virginia state Senator
- Greg Jeffries (born 1971), American football player
- Gregg Jeffries (born 1967), American baseball player
- Hakeem Jeffries (born 1970), American politician
- Herb Jeffries (1913–2014), American singer and actor
- James Jeffries (disambiguation), several people, including:
  - James Jeffries (Louisiana politician), Louisiana Lt. Governor
  - James Edmund Jeffries (1925–1997), Kansas congressman
  - James J. Jeffries (1875–1953), boxing champion
  - Jim Jeffries (baseball) (1893–1938), American Negro league baseball player
- Jared Jeffries (born 1981), American basketball player
- John Jeffries (disambiguation) several people, including
  - John Jeffries (1744–1819), Boston physician
  - John Jeffries II (1796–1876), American ophthalmic surgeon
  - John Jeffries (judge) (1929–2019), New Zealand local politician and senior civil servant
  - John Calvin Jeffries (born c. 1948), law professor
- Joseph Mary Nagle Jeffries (1880–1960), British war correspondent, historian and author
- Kevin Jeffries (born 1964), American politician
- Lang Jeffries (1930–1987), Canadian-American actor
- Leah Jeffries (born 2009), American actress
- Leonard Jeffries (born 1937), American professor of Black Studies
- Lionel Jeffries (1926–2010), English actor
- Mary Jeffries (disambiguation) several people, including
  - Mary Frances Jeffries (1854–1907), London brothel madam
  - Mary T. Jeffries (1863–1930), American temperance advocate
- Maud Jeffries (1869–1946), American actress who married and settled in Australia
- Mike Jeffries (CEO) (born 1944), American CEO
- Mike Jeffries (soccer) (born 1962), retired American soccer player
- Philip M. Jeffries (1925–1987), American set decorator
- Ron Jeffries (born 1939), American computer scientist
- Rosemary Jeffries, American nun and educator
- Sabrina Jeffries, American author
- Ted Jeffries (1908–1985), American football coach
- Thomas Jeffries (died 1826), Australian outlaw & prisoner
- Tony Jeffries (born 1985), English professional boxer
- Walter S. Jeffries (1893–1954), American politician
- Walter V. Jeffries (born 1962), American farmer, businessman, author and inventor
- William Arthur Jeffries (1921–1981), English footballer for Mansfield Town
- William Henry Jeffries (1845–1921), Methodist minister in England and Australia
- Willie Jeffries (born 1937), American college football coach

== See also ==
- Jeffreys (disambiguation)
- Jefferies tube
- Jeffries Range, Canada
- Jeffry
- Jeffery (disambiguation)
- Geoffrey (disambiguation)
- Jefferies Financial Group
  - Jefferies Group
- Jeffers
- Haywood Jeffires (born 1964), American football player, whose family name is pronounced "Jeffries"
- Jim Jefferies (born 1977), Australian comedian
