= Jeffry =

Jeffry is a given name. It may refer to:

== People ==
- Jeff Flake (born 1962), American politician and diplomat
- Jeffry Fortes (born 1989), Dutch footballer
- Jeffry Frieden, 20th-21st century American political scientist
- Jeffry House (born 1946), American lawyer
- Jeffry Jack (born 1961), American politician
- Jeff Kahn (mathematician), 20th-21st century American mathematics professor
- Jeffry Katz (born 1943), American music producer
- Jeffry H. Larson (1949–2024), American psychotherapist and academic
- Jeffry D. Madura (1957–2017), American chemist
- Jeffry Miranda (born 2002), Honduran footballer
- Jeffry Picower (1942–2009), American investor and philanthropist, biggest beneficiary of the Madoff Ponzi scheme
- Jeffry Puriel (born 2002), Dutch footballer
- Jeffry Romero (born 1989), Colombian former racing cyclist
- Jeffry Timmons (1941–2008), American business theorist and academic
- Jeff Wayne (born 1943), American-British composer, musician and lyricist
- Jeffry D. Wert (born 1946), American historian and author specializing in the American Civil War
- Jeffry Wickham (1933–2014), English actor
- Jeffry Wyatville (1766–1840), English architect and garden designer
- Jeffry Jusab (born 2000), English actor

== Fictional characters ==
- Jeffry McWild, from the video game Virtua Fighter

== See also ==
- Jeffery (name)
- Jeff
- Jeffy
- Geoffrey (name)
