= Jefferies =

Jefferies is an English surname. Notable people with the surname include:

- Alan Jefferies (born 1957), Australian writer
- Annalee Jefferies (born 1954), American actress
- Axcil Jefferies (born 1994), Zimbabwean racing driver
- Chris Jefferies (born 1980), American basketball player
- Cindy Jefferies, English writer of fiction for children
- Darren Jefferies (born 1993), English footballer
- Daulton Jefferies (born 1995), American baseball player
- Dinah Jefferies (born 1948), English writer
- Gregg Jefferies (born 1967), American baseball infielder
- Jim Jefferies (comedian) (born 1977), Australian comedian
- Jim Jefferies (footballer) (born 1950), Scottish football player and manager
- Jim Jeffries (baseball) (1893–1938), American baseball player
- Matt Jefferies (1921–2003), American artist, set designer and writer
- Richard Jefferies (1848–1887), English nature writer
- Thomas Jeffries, also known as Thomas Jefferies (died 1826), Australian outlaw & prisoner

== See also ==
- Jefferies Financial Group, American financial services holding company
  - Jefferies Group, financial services subsidiary of Jefferies Financial Group
- Jefferys
- Jeffreys, surname
- Jeffries, surname
