= ENDF =

ENDF may refer to:

- Ethiopian National Defense Force
- Evaluated Nuclear Data File
- Escuela Nacional de Danza Folklórica
