= Charles Jeffrey =

Charles Jeffrey may refer to:

- Charles Jeffrey (footballer)
- Charles Jeffrey (fashion designer)
- Charles Jeffrey (botanist)
