= Jeff Terrell =

Jeff Terrell may refer to:

- Jeff Terrell, Berlin Raceway 1995 Randy Sweet Late Model Champion (Sportsman Champion) and 1999 Randy Sweet Late Model Champion (Super Stock Champion)
- Jeff Terrell, fictional character Shaft (Image Comics)

== See also ==
- Terrell (disambiguation)
- Jeff (disambiguation)
