= BBY =

BBY may stand for:

- BBY Limited, an Australian stockbroking and corporate advisory firm
- Back Bay station (station code: BBY), Amtrak and MBTA train station in Boston, USA
- Bambari Airport, Central African Republic (IATA code: BBY)
- "Before the Battle of Yavin", a system of measuring dates in Star Wars
- Best Buy (NYSE: BBY), American multinational retailer
- Burnaby, British Columbia, Canada, a city
- Menchum language of Cameroon (ISO 639:bby)
