= Gay =

Term referring to a homosexual person

The rainbow flag, a common symbol representing gay people, or more recently, the overall LGBTQ community.

Gay is a term that primarily refers to a homosexual person or the trait of being homosexual. The term originally meant "carefree", "cheerful', or "bright and showy". The term was uncommonly used to refer to male homosexuality beginning in the late 19th century, with that meaning becoming increasingly common by the mid-20th century. In modern English, gay has come to be used as an adjective, and as a noun, referring to the community, practices and cultures associated with homosexuality. In the 1960s, gay became the word favored by homosexual men to describe their sexual orientation. By the end of the 20th century and beginning of the 21st century, the word gay was recommended by major LGBTQ groups and style guides to describe people attracted to members of the same sex, although it is more commonly used to refer specifically to men.

Since the 1980s, a new, pejorative use became prevalent in some parts of the world. Among younger speakers, the word has a meaning ranging from derision (e.g., equivalent to "rubbish" or "stupid") to a light-hearted mockery or ridicule (e.g., equivalent to "weak", "unmanly", or "boring"). The extent to which these usages still retain connotations of homosexuality has been debated and harshly criticized. Because of the strongly offensive and homophobic insult, the use of gay as an insult is generally considered socially inappropriate, sometimes even legally restricted.

== History ==
=== Overview ===
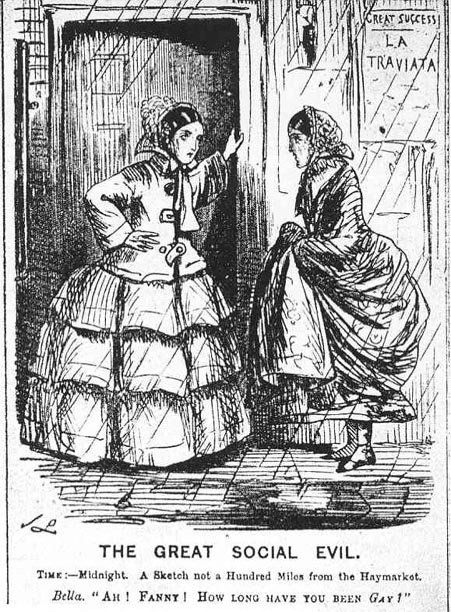
Cartoon from Punch magazine in 1857 illustrating the use of "gay" as a colloquial euphemism for being a prostitute; one woman says to the other (who looks glum), "How long have you been gay?" The poster on the wall is for La Traviata, an opera about a courtesan

The word gay arrived in English during the 12th century from Old French gai, most likely deriving ultimately from a Germanic source.

In English, the word's primary meaning was "joyful", "carefree", "bright and showy", and the word was very commonly used with this meaning in speech and literature. For example, the optimistic 1890s are still often referred to as the Gay Nineties. The title of the 1938 French ballet Gaîté Parisienne ("Parisian Gaiety"), which became the 1941 Warner Brothers movie, The Gay Parisian, also illustrates this connotation. It was apparently not until the 20th century that the word began to be used to mean specifically "homosexual", although it had earlier acquired sexual connotations.

The derived abstract noun gaiety remains largely free of sexual connotations and has, in the past, been used in the names of places of entertainment, such as the Gaiety Theatre in Dublin.

=== Sexualization ===
Usage statistics from English books, according to Google Ngram Viewer

The word may have started to acquire associations of sexual immorality as early as the 14th century, but had certainly acquired them by the 17th. By the late 17th century, it had acquired the specific meaning of "addicted to pleasures and dissipations", an extension of its primary meaning of "carefree" implying "uninhibited by moral constraints". A gay woman was a prostitute, a gay man a womanizer, and a gay house a brothel. An example is a letter read to a London court in 1885 during the prosecution of brothel madam and procuress Mary Jeffries that had been written by a girl while enslaved inside of a French brothel:

I write to tell you it is a gay house ... Some captains came in the other night, and the mistress wanted us to sleep with them.

The use of gay to mean "homosexual" was often an extension of its application to prostitution: a gay boy was a young man or boy serving male clients.

Similarly, a gay cat was a young male apprenticed to an older hobo and commonly exchanging sex and other services for protection and tutelage. The application to homosexuality was also an extension of the word's sexualized connotation of "carefree and uninhibited", which implied a willingness to disregard conventional or respectable sexual mores. Such usage, documented as early as the 1920s, was likely present before the 20th century, although it was initially more commonly used to imply heterosexually unconstrained lifestyles, as in the once-common phrase "gay Lothario", or in the title of the book and film The Gay Falcon (1941), which concerns a womanizing detective whose first name is "Gay". Similarly, Fred Gilbert and G. H. MacDermott's music hall song of the 1880s, "Charlie Dilke Upset the Milk" – "Master Dilke upset the milk, when taking it home to Chelsea; the papers say that Charlie's gay, rather a wilful wag!" – referred to Sir Charles Dilke's alleged heterosexual impropriety. Giving testimony in court in 1889, the prostitute John Saul stated: "I occasionally do odd-jobs for different gay people."

Well into the mid-20th century a middle-aged bachelor could be described as "gay", indicating that he was unattached and therefore free, without any implication of homosexuality. This usage could apply to women too. The British comic strip Jane, first published in the 1930s, described the adventures of Jane Gay. Far from implying homosexuality, it referred to her free-wheeling lifestyle with plenty of boyfriends (while also punning on Lady Jane Grey).

A passage from Gertrude Stein's Miss Furr & Miss Skeene (1922) is possibly the first traceable published use of the word to refer to a homosexual relationship. According to Linda Wagner-Martin (Favored Strangers: Gertrude Stein and her Family, 1995) the portrait "featured the sly repetition of the word gay, used with sexual intent for one of the first times in linguistic history", and Edmund Wilson (1951, quoted by James Mellow in Charmed Circle, 1974) agreed. For example:

They were ... gay, they learned little things that are things in being gay, ... they were quite regularly gay.

— Gertrude Stein, 1922

The word continued to be used with the dominant meaning of "carefree", as evidenced by the title of The Gay Divorcee (1934), a musical film about a heterosexual couple.

Bringing Up Baby (1938) was the first film to use the word gay in an apparent reference to homosexuality. In a scene in which Cary Grant's character's clothes have been sent to the cleaners, he is forced to wear a woman's feather-trimmed robe. When another character asks about his robe, he responds, "Because I just went gay all of a sudden!" Since this was a mainstream film, at a time when the use of the word to refer to cross-dressing (which may imply homosexuality) would still be unfamiliar to most film-goers, the line can also be interpreted to mean, "I just decided to do something odd, frivolous."

In 1950, the earliest reference found to date for the word gay as a self-described name for homosexuals came from Alfred A. Gross, executive secretary for the George W. Henry Foundation, who said in the June 1950 issue of SIR magazine: "I have yet to meet a happy homosexual. They have a way of describing themselves as gay but the term is a misnomer. Those who are habitues of the bars frequented by others of the kind, are about the saddest people I've ever seen."

=== Shift to specifically homosexual ===
By the mid-20th century, gay was well established in reference to hedonistic and uninhibited lifestyles and its antonym straight, which had long had connotations of seriousness, respectability, and conventionality, had now acquired specific connotations of heterosexuality. In the case of gay, other connotations of showiness and frivolousness in dress ("gay apparel") led to association with sassiness, effeminacy, and camp. This association no doubt helped the gradual narrowing in scope of the term towards its current dominant meaning, which was at first confined to subcultures. Gay was the preferred term since other terms, such as queer, were felt to be derogatory. Homosexual is perceived as excessively clinical, since the sexual orientation now commonly referred to as "homosexuality" was at that time a mental illness diagnosis in the Diagnostic and Statistical Manual of Mental Disorders (DSM).

In mid-20th century Britain, where male homosexuality was illegal until the Sexual Offences Act 1967, to openly identify someone as homosexual was considered very offensive and an accusation of serious criminal activity. Additionally, none of the words describing any aspect of homosexuality were considered suitable for polite society. Consequently, a number of euphemisms were used to hint at suspected homosexuality. Examples include "sporty" girls and "artistic" boys, all with the stress deliberately on the otherwise completely innocent adjective.

The 1960s marked the transition in the predominant meaning of the word gay from that of "carefree" to the current "homosexual". In the British comedy-drama film Light Up the Sky! (1960), directed by Lewis Gilbert, about the antics of a British Army searchlight squad during World War II, there is a scene in the mess hut where the character played by Benny Hill proposes an after-dinner toast. He begins, "I'd like to propose..." at which point a fellow diner interjects "Who to?", implying a proposal of marriage. The Benny Hill character responds, "Not to you for start, you ain't my type". He then adds in mock doubt, "Oh, I don't know, you're rather gay on the quiet."

By 1963, a new sense of the word gay was known well enough to be used by Albert Ellis in his book The Intelligent Woman's Guide to Man-Hunting. Similarly, Hubert Selby Jr. in his 1964 novel Last Exit to Brooklyn, could write that a character "took pride in being a homosexual by feeling intellectually and esthetically superior to those (especially women) who weren't gay...." Later examples of the original meaning of the word being used in popular culture include the theme song to the 1960–1966 animated TV series The Flintstones, wherein viewers are assured that they will "have a gay old time." Similarly, the 1966 Herman's Hermits song "No Milk Today", which became a Top 10 hit in the UK and a Top 40 hit in the U.S., included the lyric "No milk today, it was not always so; The company was gay, we'd turn night into day."

In June 1967, the headline of the review of the Beatles' Sgt. Pepper's Lonely Hearts Club Band album in the British daily newspaper The Times stated, "The Beatles revive hopes of progress in pop music with their gay new LP". The same year, the Kinks recorded "David Watts", which is about a schoolmate of Ray Davies, but is named after a homosexual concert promoter they knew, with the ambiguous line "he is so gay and fancy-free" attesting to the word's double meaning at that time. As late as 1970, the first episode of The Mary Tyler Moore Show has the demonstrably straight Mary Richards' neighbor Phyllis breezily declaiming that Mary is still "young and gay", but in an episode about two years later, Phyllis is told that her brother is "gay", which is immediately understood to mean that he is homosexual.

== Homosexuality ==
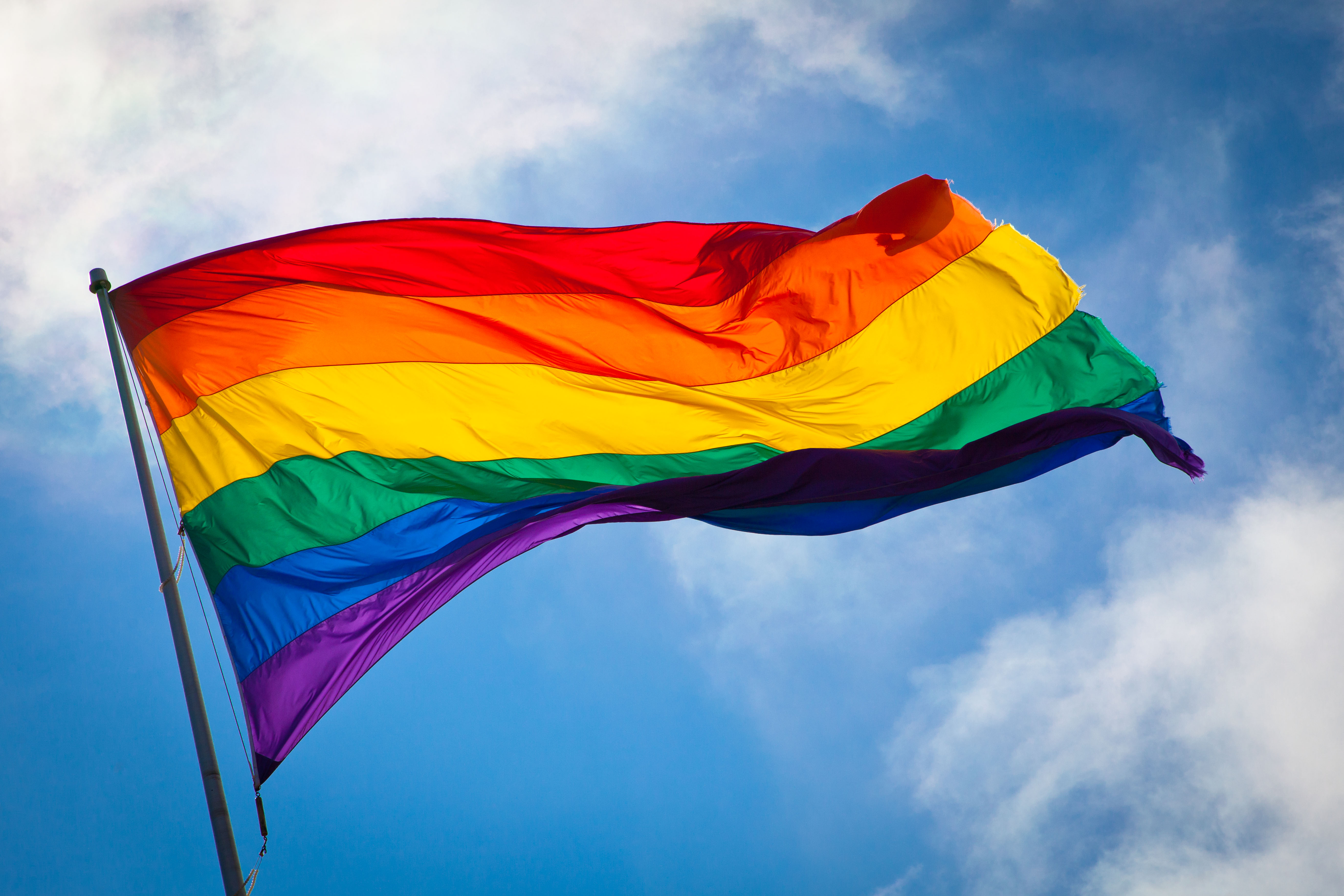
The rainbow flag is a symbol of gay pride

=== Sexual orientation, identity, behavior ===
The American Psychological Association defines sexual orientation as "an enduring pattern of emotional, romantic, and/or sexual attractions to men, women, or both sexes," ranging "along a continuum, from exclusive attraction to the other sex to exclusive attraction to the same sex." Sexual orientation can also be "discussed in terms of three categories: heterosexual (having emotional, romantic, or sexual attractions to members of the other sex), gay/lesbian (having emotional, romantic, or sexual attractions to members of one's own sex), and bisexual (having emotional, romantic, or sexual attractions to both men and women)."

According to Rosario, Schrimshaw, Hunter, Braun (2006), "the development of a lesbian, gay, or bisexual (LGB) sexual identity is a complex and often difficult process. Unlike members of other minority groups (e.g., ethnic and racial minorities), most LGB individuals are not raised in a community of similar others from whom they learn about their identity and who reinforce and support that identity. Rather, LGB individuals are often raised in communities that are either ignorant of or openly hostile toward homosexuality."

The British gay rights activist Peter Tatchell has argued that the term gay is merely a cultural expression which reflects the current status of homosexuality within a given society, and claiming that "Queer, gay, homosexual ... in the long view, they are all just temporary identities. One day, we will not need them at all."

If a person engages in sexual activity with a partner of the same sex but does not self-identify as gay, terms such as 'closeted', 'discreet', or 'bi-curious' may apply. Conversely, a person may identify as gay without having had sex with a same-sex partner. Possible choices include identifying as gay socially, while choosing to be celibate, or while anticipating a first homosexual experience. Further, a bisexual person might also identify as "gay" but others may consider gay and bisexual to be mutually exclusive. There are some who are drawn to the same sex but neither engage in sexual activity nor identify as gay; these could have the term asexual applied, even though asexual generally can mean no attraction, or involve heterosexual attraction but no sexual activity.

==== Terminology ====
Some reject the term homosexual as an identity-label because they find it too clinical-sounding; they believe it is too focused on physical acts rather than romance or attraction, or too reminiscent of the era when homosexuality was considered a mental illness. Conversely, some reject the term gay as an identity-label because they perceive the cultural connotations to be undesirable or because of the negative connotations of the slang usage of the word.

Style guides, like the following from the Associated Press, call for gay over homosexual:

Gay: Used to describe men and women attracted to the same sex, though lesbian is the more common term for women. Preferred over homosexual except in clinical contexts or references to sexual activity.

There are those who reject the gay label for reasons other than shame or negative connotations. Writer Alan Bennett and fashion icon André Leon Talley are out and open queer men who reject being labeled gay, believing the gay label confines them.

=== Gay community vs. LGBTQ community ===
Starting in the mid-1980s in the United States, a conscious effort was underway within what was then commonly called the gay community, to add the term lesbian to the name of organizations that involved both male and female homosexuals, and to use the terminology of gay and lesbian, lesbian/gay, or a similar phrase when referring to that community. Accordingly, organizations such as the National Gay Task Force became the National Gay and Lesbian Task Force. For many feminist lesbians, it was also important that lesbian be named first, to avoid the implication that women were secondary to men, or an afterthought. In the 1990s, this was followed by a similar effort to include terminology specifically including bisexual, transgender, intersex, and other people, reflecting the intra-community debate about the inclusion of these other sexual minorities as part of the same movement. Consequently, the portmanteau les/bi/gay has sometimes been used, and initialisms such as LGBT, LGBTQ, LGBTQI, and others have come into common use by such organizations, and most news organizations have formally adopted some such variation.

=== Descriptor ===
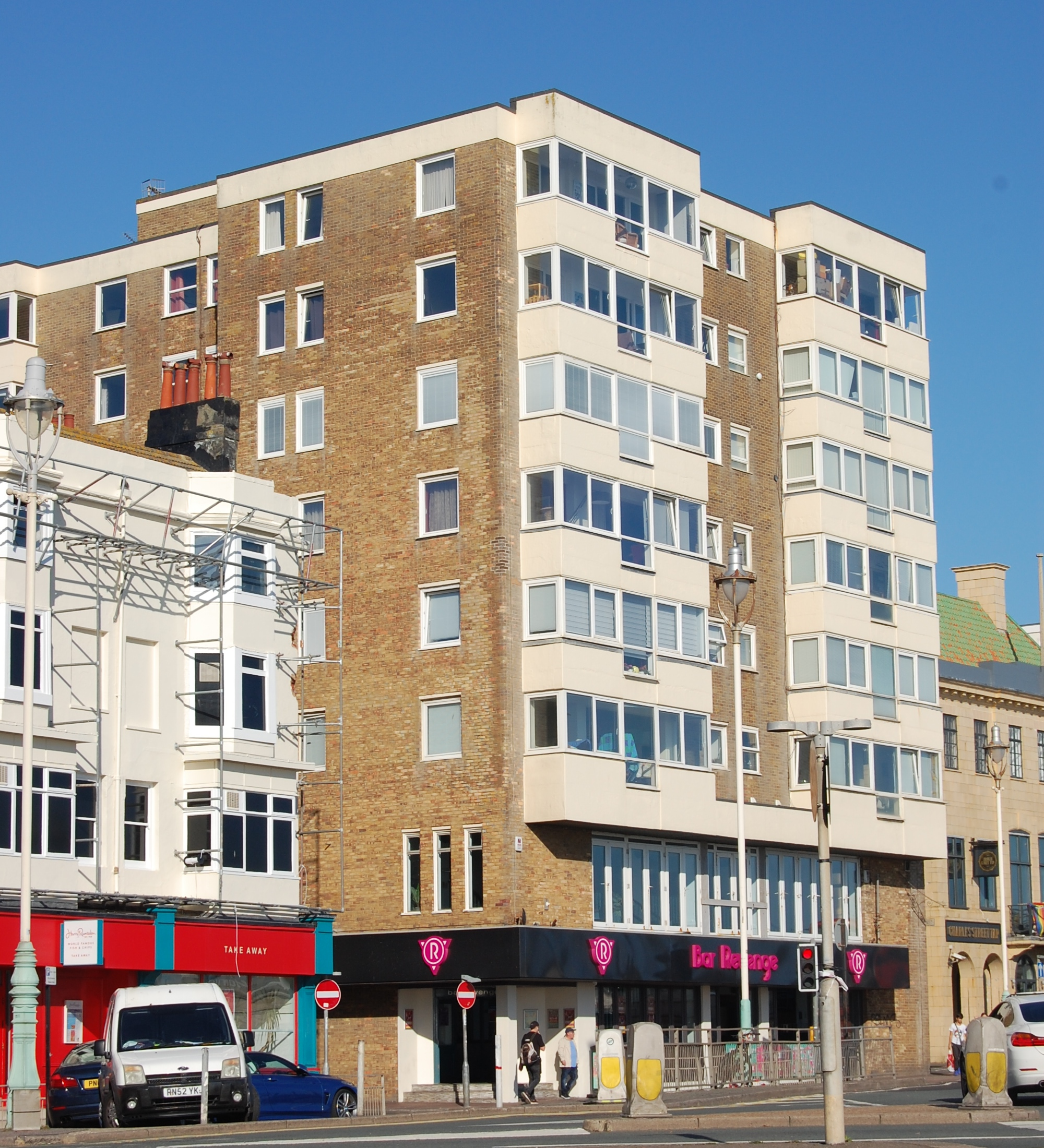
"Bar Revenge", a gay bar in Brighton, England

The term gay can also be used as an adjective to describe things related to homosexual men, or things which are part of the said culture. For example, the term "gay bar" describes the bar which either caters primarily to a homosexual male clientele or is otherwise part of homosexual male culture.

Using it to describe an object, such as an item of clothing, suggests that it is particularly flamboyant, often on the verge of being gaudy and garish. This usage predates the association of the term with homosexuality but has acquired different connotations since the modern usage developed.

=== Use as a noun ===
The label gay was originally used purely as an adjective ("he is a gay man" or "he is gay"). The term has also been in use as a noun with the meaning "homosexual man" since the 1970s, most commonly in the plural for an unspecified group, as in "gays are opposed to that policy." This usage is somewhat common in the names of organizations such as Parents, Families and Friends of Lesbians and Gays (PFLAG) and Children of Lesbians And Gays Everywhere (COLAGE). It is sometimes used to refer to individuals, as in "he is a gay" or "two gays were there too," although this may be perceived as derogatory. It was also used for comedic effect by the Little Britain character Dafydd Thomas. To avoid pejorative connotations, the adjective form can be used instead, e.g. "gay person" or "gay people".

== Generalized pejorative use ==
When used with a derisive attitude (e.g., "that was so gay"), the word gay is pejorative. Though retaining other meanings, its use among young people as a term of disparagement is common; 97 percent of American LGBTQ middle and high school students reported hearing its negative use as of 2021.

This pejorative usage has its origins in the late 1970s, with the word gaining a pejorative sense by association with the previous meaning: homosexuality was seen as inferior or undesirable. Beginning in the 1980s, and especially in the late 1990s, the usage as a generic insult became common among young people. Use of "gay" in some circumstances continues to be considered a pejorative in present day. As recently as 2023, the American Psychological Association described language like "that's so gay" as heterosexist and heteronormative.

The pejorative usage of the word "gay" has been criticized as homophobic. A 2006 BBC ruling by the Board of Governors over the negative use of the word by Chris Moyles advises that "caution on its use"; however, it acknowledges its common use among young people to mean "rubbish" or "lame".

The BBC's ruling was heavily criticized by the Minister for Children, Kevin Brennan, who stated in response that "the casual use of homophobic language by mainstream radio DJs" is:

"too often seen as harmless banter instead of the offensive insult that it really represents. ... To ignore this problem is to collude in it. The blind eye to casual name-calling, looking the other way because it is the easy option, is simply intolerable."

Shortly after the Moyles incident, a campaign against homophobia was launched in Britain under the slogan "homophobia is gay", playing on the double meaning of the word "gay" in youth culture, as well as the popular perception that vocal homophobia is common among closeted homosexuals.

The United States had its own popular campaign against the pejorative use of "gay" called Think B4 You Speak. It was created in 2008 in partnership with the Advertising Council, GLSEN, and Arnold NYC. This initiative created television, radio, print and web PSAs with goals "to motivate teens to become allies in the efforts to raise awareness, stop using anti-LGBT language and safely intervene when they are present and anti-LGBT harassment and behavior occurs."

Research has looked into the use and effect of the pejorative. In a 2013 article published in the Journal of Interpersonal Violence, University of Michigan researchers Michael Woodford, Alex Kulick and Perry Silverschanz, alongside Appalachian State University professor Michael L. Howell, argued that the pejorative use of the word "gay" was a microaggression. They found that college-age men were more likely to repeat the word pejoratively if their friends said it, while they were less likely to say it if they had lesbian, gay or bisexual peers. A 2019 study used data collected in a 2013 survey of cisgender LGBQ+ college students to evaluate the effects of microaggressions like "that's so gay" and "no homo". It found that increased exposure to the phrase "that's so gay" was significantly associated with greater developmental challenge (a measure of academic stressors). Research published in the Journal of Youth and Adolescence in 2021 finds that use of anti-gay banter among Midwestern middle and high school students such as "that's so gay" is perceived less negatively and more humorously if the person saying it is a friend.

== Parallels in other languages and cultures ==
- The concept of a "gay identity" and the use of the term gay may not be used or understood the same way in non-Westernised cultures, since modes of sexuality may differ from those prevalent in the West.
- For example, two-spirit is a term used by some Indigenous people in the United States and Canada to describe Indigenous people in their communities who do not conform to Western expressions of gender and sexuality. It functions as a modern, pan-Indian umbrella term, much like the use of queer or LGBTQ by non-Natives. Some Indigenous people identify as both two-spirit and gay. For some traditional Native Americans, who usually use terms in their own languages for these individuals rather than the English neologism, two-spirit is not interchangeable with the "LGBT Native American" or "gay Indian" sexual and gender identity labels because it is a sacred, spiritual, and ceremonial role that is recognized and confirmed only by tribal elders of the two-spirit person's ceremonial community.
- The German equivalent for "gay", "schwul", which is etymologically derived from "schwül" (hot, humid), also acquired the pejorative meaning within youth culture.

== See also ==
- Deviance (sociology) – Action or behavior that violates social norms
- Gay bashing – Violence against and bullying of LGBTQ people
- Gay gene (Xq28)
- Hate speech
- Human sexuality
  - Human female sexuality
  - Human male sexuality
- Human Rights Campaign – American LGBTQ civil rights advocacy group
- Labeling theory – Sociological theory
- LGBTQ themes in mythology
- List of gay, lesbian or bisexual people
- List of LGBTQ events
- Men who have sex with men
- Opposition to LGBTQ rights
- Religion and sexuality
- Sexual practices between men
- Sexual practices between women
- Social stigma
