= William Jeffrey =

William or Bill Jeffrey may refer to:

- Bill Jeffrey (born 1948), British civil servant
- William A. Jeffrey, American scientist
- William Jeffrey (cricketer) (1950–1993), Guyanese cricket player and coach
- William Jeffrey (footballer) (1866–1932), English footballer with Burnley, Arsenal and Southampton
- William Jeffrey (American soccer) (1892–1966), head coach of the 1950 United States World Cup team
- William Jeffrey (Tsimshian chief) (born 1899), hereditary Tsimshian Chief, First Nations activist and carver
- William Jeffrey, a pseudonym of writer Bill Pronzini
