= Jeffery =

Jeffery may refer to:

- Jeffery (name), including a list of people with the name
- Jeffery (automobile), an early American automobile manufacturer
- Thomas B. Jeffery Company
- Jeffery Boulevard, a major north–south street on the South Side of Chicago
- Jeffery armored car
- Jeffery (mixtape), by rapper Young Thug

== See also ==
- Jeffrey (disambiguation)
- Jefferies (disambiguation)
- Jeffries, a surname
- Jeffers, a surname
- Geoffrey (disambiguation)
