= Charles Cowley (attorney) =

American lawyer

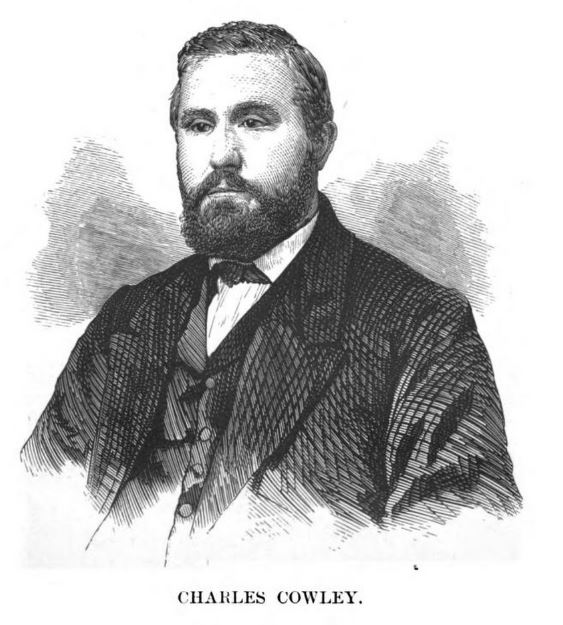
- From History of Lowell, Massachusetts, 1868
- Born: January 9, 1832; Gloucestershire, England
- Died: February 6, 1908 (aged 76); Lowell, Massachusetts

Charles Cowley (1832–1908) was an English-born American attorney and author who resided in Lowell, Massachusetts.

== Early life ==
Charles Cowley was a native of England, born in Eastington, Gloucestershire on January 9, 1832. He was the son of Aaron Cowley and Hannah Price. He came to America with his family in 1842 and settled in Lowell, Massachusetts, where his father worked in the textile industry. He was educated with a mix of public schools and private tutors. Cowley worked for the Lowell Daily Courier, a Whig newspaper, before he was twenty-one years old and was called the "boy editor" due to his age. He left the paper in 1854 after an attack of typhoid fever and began to study law upon his recovery. While studying law under Josiah Abbott and Samuel Brown, he wrote his first history of Lowell, Massachusetts. The book was entitled A Hand Book of Business in Lowell, with a History of the City and was published in 1856. He was admitted to the Bar for the state of Massachusetts the same year.

== Civil War ==
He began the Civil War as a captain with the Wamesit Rifles in 1861, a company organized May 17, 1861, in Lowell, Massachusetts. He left the Wamesit Rifles to join the Navy in 1864 as Paymaster of the USS Lehigh but resigned later that year to be Judge Advocate in the South Atlantic Squadron where he served on the USS Philadelphia as part of Admiral John A. Dahlgren's staff until the end of the war.

== Post Civil War ==
Cowley returned to Lowell and resumed his writing and legal careers. His 1856 history of his adopted hometown was revised and published in 1868 as A History of Lowell. His other books include: Famous Divorces of all Ages (1878), Our Divorce Courts (1879), Reminiscences of James C. Ayer and the Town of Ayer (1879), Leaves from a Lawyers Life Afloat and Ashore (1879) about his experiences in the Navy.

He worked as a reformer both inside and outside of government to bring about change including the passage of an act incorporating the first trade union in 1870 and ten hour factory law in Massachusetts in 1874. He was member of the common council and overseer of the poor in 1875–1876.

Norwich University bestowed the honorary degree of LL. D. on him in 1885.

Cowley was involved with several organizations including the Knights of Pythias, Grand Army of the Republic and New England Historic Genealogical Society.

He died on February 6, 1908, in Lowell without ever marrying.

== Memorial Day controversy ==
Cowley's book Leaves from a Lawyers Life Afloat and Ashore includes a reference to a promise he made to his friend James Redpath to speak at a cemetery dedication ceremony organized by Redpath on May 1, 1865. Cowley claims that this ceremony, which he failed to attend, was the origin of the Memorial Day holiday.

In their 2014 book, The Genesis of the Memorial Day Holiday in America, Bellware and Gardiner identify Charles Cowley's book as an early source of the idea that the first Memorial Day occurred in Charleston, South Carolina, in 1865. Although the idea has been republished and debunked several times in the past, David Blight reintroduced this claim in his book Race and Reunion in 2001. Like many before them, Bellware and Gardiner dispute the notion that this Charleston event is the origin of Memorial Day. They point out that what took place was a cemetery dedication, a one-time event. It was not meant to be repeated annually. It also occurred on the already established May Day holiday, and was therefore just part of floral celebration of that holiday and not a new one. This assessment agrees with that of Snopes.com, who gives the story a Half-True as the event occurred but was not the origin of Memorial Day. Bellware and Gardiner credit Mary Ann Williams and the Ladies Memorial Association of Columbus, Georgia as the true originators of the holiday as abundant contemporaneous evidence from across the nation exists to substantiate the claim.
