= Oregon LNG =

American energy company

Oregon LNG is an American energy company whose sole project was a proposal to build a bi-directional liquefied natural gas (LNG) production (i.e. liquefaction), shipping, and receiving hub and a natural gas pipeline in northwest Oregon. Oregon LNG is controlled by the US conglomerate Leucadia National Corporation, listed on the New York Stock Exchange (NYSE: LUK). The Oregon LNG Project announced that it was ceasing operations on 15 April 2016.

The site of the proposed bi-directional Oregon LNG facility was in Warrenton, Oregon, on the estuary of the Columbia River. Warrenton is eight miles (13 km) west of Astoria, Oregon, and is less than 10 miles (16 km) from the point where the Columbia empties into the Pacific Ocean. The site is currently being leased by Oregon LNG and consists of 96 acres (39 hectares) on the Skipanon Peninsula, a man-made peninsula that was created in the 1920s out of dredge spoils. The proposed terminal would have the capacity to liquefy and ship up to 9.6 million tons of LNG per year and would also have the capacity to import and re-vaporize up to 500 million cubic feet of natural gas per day during regional supply emergencies.

For transport, the gas is chilled to approximately negative 260 °F (- 163 °C). This condenses the gas into a liquid, making it much more compact and economical to ship. At its destination, the LNG is transferred from cargo ships to a receiving terminal, which then warms the LNG back to a gaseous state to be piped to customers. If built, the Oregon LNG project would include a marine shipping and receiving terminal, two full-containment 160,000-cubic-meter LNG storage tanks, and facilities for ship berthing and offloading.[1] The storage tanks would be 190 feet tall and would be visible from Astoria. A 2,100-foot (640 m) pier would jut into the river, where a basin would be dredged for LNG tankers to unload.

== History ==
The project currently known as Oregon LNG began as the Skipanon Natural Gas Facility, with initial talks in 2004.[2] Calpine Energy initiated the project, signing a lease for the 96-acre (388,500 m2) site with the Port of Astoria. In 2005, Calpine went into bankruptcy[1] and the project was subsequently acquired from Calpine in January, 2007[2] by a partnership between original managers of the project and Leucadia National Corp.[3] Leucadia holds a majority share of Oregon LNG.[4]

Oregon LNG filed a formal application with the Federal Energy Regulatory Commission (FERC) in October 2008[5] for the import portion of the project. Following the discovery of large shale-gas reserves in the United States and Canada, Oregon LNG modified the project concept and entered FERC's "Pre-Filing" process for the export portion of the project in July 2012.

The Oregon LNG Project announced that it was ceasing operations on 15 April 2016.

== Opposition ==
Oregon LNG was opposed by a number of groups including The Columbia Riverkeeper and Rising Tide who support reduced pollution, non-fossil fuel, renewable energy sources. The pipeline is also opposed by certain landowners who object to eminent domain laws that would force them to have pipelines buried on their properties. In 2011 the Oregon Legislature passed House Bill 2700, which streamlined the permitting of such linear facilities amid a great deal of citizen objections and protests.

Local and state agencies, and tribes recently submitted detailed comments to the U.S. Army Corps of Engineers (Corps), and to the Oregon Department of Environmental Quality that describe why Oregon LNG's project would violate environmental laws. Over two dozen fishing, landowner, community safety, and conservation organizations joined Columbia Riverkeeper on these comments.

Expert Report: Review of the Impacts of Oregon LNG’s Proposed Pipeline on Aquatic Ecosystems. Jonathan Rhodes, PhD. Planeto Azul Hydrology. January 12, 2015
Expert Report: Review of the Draft Biological Assessment and Essential Fish Habitat Assessment for Proposed Oregon LNG Terminal Project. Richard Williams, PhD. Clear Creek Consulting. January 8, 2015
Oregon Department of Fish and Wildlife (ODFW) Public Comments Oregon LNG
Columbia River Estuary Study Taskforce (CREST) Public Comments Oregon LNG
Center for Biological Diversity Public Comments Oregon LNG
State of Oregon Letter to Federal Energy Regulatory Commission (FERC)
Columbia Riverkeeper et al. Public Comments Oregon LNG: Corps
Columbia Riverkeeper et al. Public Comments Oregon LNG: DEQ
