= Jeffers =

Jeffers is a surname. Notable people with the surname include:

- Alex Jeffers, American author
- Alexis Jeffers (born 1968), St. Kitts and Nevis politician
- Anne Burton Jeffers (1851–1946), American librarian
- Audrey Jeffers (1898–1968), Trinidadian social worker and politician
- Brent Jeffers, American football coach
- Christopher Jeffers (born 1988), English actor and dancer
- Ed Jeffers (1921–2010), American football player
- Francis Jeffers (born 1981), English football player
- Grace Jeffers (born 1967), American writer and artist
- Hamilton Jeffers (1893–1976), American astronomer
- Henry W. Jeffers (1871–1953), American dairyman and politician
- Jaeda-Lei Jeffers (born 2007), British gymnast
- James D. Jeffers (1798–1831), commonly known as Charles Gibbs, American pirate
- Jim Jeffers (1912–1992), Australian rules footballer
- John Jeffers (born 1968), English footballer
- Juliette Jeffers, American actress
- Kelvin Jeffers (born 1963), Nevisian cricketer
- Lamar Jeffers (1888–1983), American politician
- Leslie Jeffers (1910–2000), English wrestler
- Maurice Jeffers (born 1979), American basketball player
- Neil Schyan Jeffers (born 1977), Antigua and Barbudan footballer
- Oliver Jeffers (born 1977), Northern Irish illustrator
- Othyus Jeffers (born 1985), American basketball player
- Patrick Jeffers (born 1973), American football player
- Rachel Jeffers (born 1985), American rower
- Robinson Jeffers (1887–1962), American poet
- Rusty Jeffers (born 1964), American bodybuilder
- Ryan Jeffers (born 1997), American baseball player
- Shane Jeffers (born 1981), Kittian cricketer
- Shaun Jeffers (born 1992), English footballer
- Sue Jeffers (born 1956), American restaurateur and politician
- Susan Jeffers (1938–2012), American author of Feel the Fear and Do It Anyway
- Susan Jeffers (1942–2020), American children's book illustrator
- Terence Jeffers-Harris (born 1988), Canadian football player
- Wellington Jeffers (1814–1896), Canadian teacher and minister
- William Nicholson Jeffers (1824–1883), American naval officer
- W. W. Jeffers (1852–1936), Canadian baseball umpire

== See also ==
- Jeffries, Jeffreys, Jefferies
- Jefferson (surname)
