= Jeffery (name) =

Jeffery is a given name or a surname. As a surname, it is a Cornish variant of the more commonly spelled given name Jeffrey.

It may refer to:

== Surname ==
- Aaron Jeffery (born 1970), New Zealand-born actor
- Alshon Jeffery (born 1990), American football player
- Arthur Jeffery (1892–1959), Australian-born professor of Semitic languages
- Clara Jeffery (born 1967), American journalist
- Chucky Jeffery (born 1991), American basketball player
- Darren Jeffery (born 1976), English opera singer
- Gabrielle Jeffery (1886–1940), British suffragist and founder of the Catholic Women's Suffrage Society
- George Barker Jeffery (1891–1957), English mathematical physicist
- George H. E. Jeffery (1855–1935), English architect and historian, curator of ancient monuments in Cyprus
- Isadore G. Jeffery (1840–1919), American poet, lyricist
- Jack Jeffery (racing driver) (1938–2005), American racing driver
- Joseph Jeffery (1829–1894), Canadian cabinet-maker
- Keith Jeffery (1952–2016), Northern Irish historian
- Margaret Jeffery (1920–2004), British swimmer and Olympian
- Michael Jeffery (Australian Army officer) (1937–2020), Australian soldier and Governor-General
- Michael Jeffery (manager) (1933–1973), English manager of musicians including Jimi Hendrix
- Paul Jeffery, alias of author F. Gwynplaine MacIntyre (1948–2010)
- Ralph Lent Jeffery (1889–1975), Canadian mathematician
- Simon Jeffery (fl. 2000s), business manager in the video games industry
- Thomas B. Jeffery (1845–1910), British-born entrepreneur and inventor in the United States
- Tony Jeffery (born 1964), American football player

== Given name ==
- Jeffery Amherst, 1st Baron Amherst, officer in the British Army
- Jeffery Deaver, American mystery/crime novelist
- Jeffery Demps, American track and field athlete and American football player
- Jeffery Lamar Williams, better known under his stage name Young Thug (born 1991), American rapper
- Jeffery Lee (born 1976), American convicted murderer
- Jeffery Simmons (born 1997), American football player
- Jeffery Taylor (born 1989), Swedish basketball player
- Jeffery Xiong, American chess grandmaster

== See also ==
- Jeff, a given name (and list of people with the name)
- Jeffrey (name), a more commonly spelled variant of the name
- Jeffry, a given name
