= Jeffy =

Given name

Jeffy is a masculine given name, a variation of Jeffrey, which may refer to:

- A child character in the syndicated comic strip The Family Circus
- A character in the 2003 novel The Devil Wears Prada
- Jeffy "Brad" Bradley, a character in the webcomic Schlock Mercenary - see List of Schlock Mercenary characters
- Jeffy, writer and director of the 2013 Indian Tamil film Nugam
- one of the mascots of JEF United Chiba, a Japanese professional football club
- Jeffy the J-Hawk, mascot of Jefferson High School (Iowa), Cedar Rapids, Iowa
- Big Jeffy, a Sesame Street Muppet (see List of Sesame Street Muppets)
