= USS Jeffers =

Gleaves-class destroyer

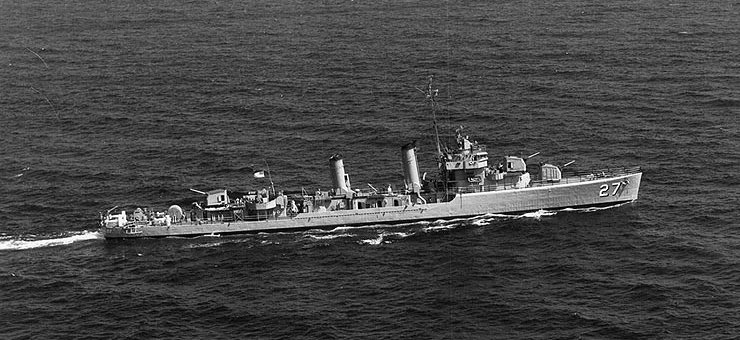
- USS Jeffers

History

United States
- Name: Jeffers
- Namesake: William N. Jeffers
- Builder: Federal Shipbuilding and Drydock Company
- Laid down: 25 March 1942
- Launched: 26 August 1942
- Commissioned: 5 November 1942
- Identification: DD-621
- Reclassified: DMS-27, 15 November 1944
- Decommissioned: 23 May 1955
- Stricken: 1 July 1971
- Fate: Sold 25 May 1973 and broken up for scrap

General characteristics
- Class & type: Gleaves-class destroyer
- Displacement: 1,630 tons
- Length: 348 ft 3 in (106.15 m)
- Beam: 36 ft 1 in (11.00 m)
- Draft: 11 ft 10 in (3.61 m)
- Propulsion: 50,000 shp (37,000 kW); 4 boilers; 2 propellers
- Speed: 37.4 knots (69 km/h)
- Range: 6,500 nmi (12,000 km; 7,500 mi) at 12 kn (22 km/h; 14 mph)
- Complement: 16 officers, 260 enlisted
- Armament: 5 × 5 in (127 mm) DP guns, 6 × 0.5 in (12.7 mm) guns, 6 × 20 mm (0.79 in) AA guns, 2 × quintuple 21 in (533 mm) torpedo tubes, 10 Mark 15 torpedoes; 2 × depth charge tracks ( depth charges)

USS Jeffers (DD-621/DMS-27), a Gleaves-class destroyer, was the only ship of the United States Navy to be named for Commodore William N. Jeffers.

Jeffers was laid down by Federal Shipbuilding & Drydock Co., Kearny, New Jersey, 25 March 1942 and launched on 26 August 1942; sponsored by Mrs. Lucie Jeffers Lyons, great-granddaughter of Commodore Jeffers. The ship was commissioned on 5 November 1942.

== Service history ==
=== Atlantic and Mediterranean service ===
After shakedown and training in Casco Bay, Maine, Jeffers operated briefly on the East Coast until departing Norfolk on 18 February 1943 on her first transatlantic voyage escorting a convoy to Casablanca and returning 14 April. The ship patrolled off NS Argentia, Newfoundland, for a week before steaming to Norfolk to prepare for the coming invasion of Sicily.

Jeffers sailed from Norfolk 8 June with Task Force 65 (TF 65) and arrived Oran, Algeria, on 22 June. While preparing for the giant assault on Sicily, she patrolled off other African ports, shooting down a German bomber during 6 July Luftwaffe raid on Bizerte. Jeffers sailed two days later with Rear Admiral John Hall's force for Gela; and, upon arrival 9 July, she guarded the transports. Early next day the great assault began, with Jeffers assigned the task of shooting out shore searchlights and providing fire support for the Amphibious Battle of Gela. As the landing proceeded with great success in the following days, the ship fired support missions and served on antisubmarine patrol. She sailed to Bizerte on 18 July, but was back at Palermo on 31 July with cargo ships. Jeffers sailed to Oran the next day, and from that port continued to New York, arriving on 22 August.

After repairs at New York, the destroyer was assigned to convoy duty between East Coast ports and Scotland. As the Allies began the great buildup of men and materiel in Britain for the landings in northern France, Jeffers made five voyages between 5 September 1943 and 22 April 1944. On her second convoy crossing to Scotland, on 21 October the ship picked up survivors from Murphy, after that destroyer had been cut in two by a tanker. She also took part in salvage operations which saved the stern of the stricken vessel.

After training operations, Jeffers sailed from New York 5 May 1944 for the United Kingdom, where she prepared for the invasion of Normandy in June. She departed Belfast 3 June for Utah Beach, where she patrolled and provided fire support as troops stormed ashore on D-Day. The veteran destroyer remained off the beach until 29 June, driving off several enemy planes and assisting damaged ships. For the next two weeks she convoyed transports from Belfast to Utah Beach as more troops and supplies were poured into the beachhead, finally departing for the Mediterranean on 16 July.

Next on the Allied timetable for the defeat of Germany was another invasion of France, this one in the south. Assigned to screen escort carriers covering the operation, Jeffers departed Malta on 12 August to join her task group. Three days later, as troops landed between Cannes and Toulon, the ship remained with supporting carriers, continuing to cruise off shore until 28 September. She then sailed for New York, arriving on 7 October to prepare for duty in the far Pacific.

=== Pacific service ===
Jeffers was converted to a destroyer-minesweeper at New York, and was reclassified DMS-27 on 15 November. She sailed 3 January 1945 for the Panama Canal and California, arriving San Diego for training on 17 January. In February she moved on to Pearl Harbor and from there to the great advance base at Ulithi to prepare for the Okinawa invasion, last and largest amphibious operation of the war against Japan. As part of the preliminary minesweeping group, Jeffers arrived off Okinawa on 24 March, one week before the landings, and began clearing mines and marking boat lanes. During the assault on 1 April the ship moved to antisubmarine screening and air defense. During the Japanese air attack of 6 April she downed a twin-engine bomber. Six days later, while on radar picket station, she again was under heavy air attack. She downed at least one of the attackers and was nearly hit by a Yokosuka MXY-7 Ohka as the attack was repulsed. Jeffers then assisted survivors of sunken Mannert L. Abele.

The veteran ship steamed into Kerama Retto to repair battle damage later that afternoon, emerging on 16 April to join a carrier group operating off Okinawa in support of ground forces. She then sailed to Guam on 3 May for further repairs. Departing again on 26 June, Jeffers sailed via Saipan and Ulithi to Kerama Retto, and spent the next six weeks on minesweeping operations north of Okinawa. She was at anchor off Okinawa when the news of the Japanese acceptance of terms was received on 15 August 1945.

Jeffers steamed into Tokyo Bay on 29 August with occupation forces, and was present for the surrender ceremonies on 2 September. She then joined a minesweeping group for vital sweeping operations around Japan, including hazardous operations in Tsushima Strait. Operating out of Sasebo, she continued to sweep in the Yellow Sea during November, getting underway on 5 December for the United States.

=== 1946 – 1955 ===
Jeffers arrived San Diego 23 December and steamed via the Panama Canal to Norfolk, where she arrived on 9 January 1946. The ship then began her peacetime duty, arriving Charleston on 12 June. She remained there for the rest of 1946 except for a short training cruise to Casco Bay. 1947 was spent on maneuvers in the Caribbean during April and May, followed by exercises on the East Coast of the United States; and 1948 was spent entirely at various East Coast ports on training duty.

After making a short cruise to the Caribbean in early 1949, Jeffers sailed on 6 September from Charleston for her first Mediterranean cruise. This was the period of unrest in Greece and Israel, and the ship took part in maneuvers around Malta until October, as America showed her might in the cause of peace and stability. She returned to Charleston on 13 October.

The next year was spent at Charleston, except for a training cruise to Guantanamo Bay in March. However, on 9 January 1951, the ship got underway again for another cruise to the Mediterranean. She visited Oran, Palermo, Athens, and Naples during this deployment, again taking part in U.S. 6th Fleet's peace-keeping operations. Arriving at Charleston on 17 May 1951, Jeffers engaged in minesweeping and antisubmarine exercises until her next scheduled Mediterranean cruise on 5 June 1952. She operated with 6th Fleet aircraft carriers and destroyers until returning to her home port on 13 October.

Jeffers spent the first half of 1953 in training off the Virginia Capes, departing Norfolk on 16 September for operations with the aircraft carrier Bennington and units of the Royal Canadian Navy in the Mediterranean. She returned to Charleston 3 February 1954. Operations from New York to Key West and Havana occupied the destroyer-minesweeper until she decommissioned at Charleston on 23 May 1955. She entered the Charleston Group, Atlantic Reserve Fleet as DD-621, having been reclassified on 15 January 1955. Jeffers was stricken from the register on 1 July 1971 and later sold on 25 May 1973 and broken up for scrap.

Jeffers received seven battle stars for World War II service.
