= Geof =

Geof is a male given name. Notable people with this name include:

- Geof Courtenay (1921–1980), English cricket player
- Geof Darrow (born 1955), American comic book artist
- Geof Gleeson (1927–1994), British judoka
- Geof Isherwood (born 1960), American illustrator
- Geof Kotila, American basketball coac h
- Geof Manthorne, American chef
- Geof Motley (born 1935), Australian rules football player and coach

== See also ==
- Geoff (disambiguation)
- Grupo Especial de Operaciones Federales, Argentina
