= Mary Jeffries =

Mary Jeffries may refer to:

- Mary Frances Jeffries (1819–1891), British madam and procuror
- Mary T. Jeffries (1863-1930), American temperance advocate
- Joseph Mary Nagle Jeffries (1880–1960), British war correspondent, historian and author.
