= Jeffrey (given name) =

- Pronunciation: /ˈdʒɛfri/ JEF-ree
- Gender: Male

Origin
- Origin: Francia, medieval France, Norman England

Other names
- Nickname: Jeff
- Derived: Godfrey, Gottfried
- Related names: Geoffrey, Jeff, Jeffry, Jeffy, Jefrey, Jeffery, Jofre, Jeffeory, Joffrey, Jefferson, Jeoffry

Jeffrey is a common English given name, and a variant form of the name Geoffrey (itself from a Middle French variant of Godfrey, Gottfried).

It has been argued that the common derivation of Middle French Geoffrey (or Geoffroy), Jeffery from Godfrey is mistaken, and that the names reflect two separate first Germanic elements god vs. gaut, which became conflated in Old High German by the end of the early medieval period.

Outside of North America, Geoffrey is more common than Jeffrey. Jeffrey and its variants are found as surnames, usually as a patronymic ending in -s (e.g., Jefferies, Jaffrays); The surname Jefferson is also a patronymic version of the given name. In Scotland, Jeffrey is most frequently found to be a surname.

Variations include Jeff, Jeffry, Jeffy, Jeffery, Jefferey, Jeffory, Jefrie, Geoff, Geoffrey, Jeffeory, Geffrey, Jefferson, and Jeffro.

== People with the given name Jeffrey ==
=== Academia ===
- Jeffrey Cole, American anthropologist
- Jeffrey Garten (born 1946), American businessman and writer
- Jeffrey Hackney (born 1941), British legal academic
- Jeffrey A. Hoffman (born 1944), American astronaut
- Jeffrey Kaplan (historian) (born 1954), American academic
- Jeffrey Lagarias (born 1949), American mathematician
- Jeffrey B. Remmel (1948–2017), American mathematician
- Jeffrey Rosen (born 1964), American legal academic
- Jeffrey Sachs (born 1954), American economist
- Jeffrey L. Seglin (born 1956), American writer and teacher

=== Art ===
- Jeffrey Rowbotham (1920–1984), Scottish architect
- Jeffrey Cheung, American skateboarder and artist
- Jeffrey Schiff, American artist
- Jeffrey Steele (artist) (1931–2021), British abstract artist

=== Business ===
- Jeffrey Cheah (born 1945), Malaysian entrepreneur
- Jeffrey Hollender (born 1954), American entrepreneur
- Jeffrey Katzenberg (born 1950), American film producer and media proprietor
- Jeffrey Rosen, American billionaire businessman
- Jeffrey Steinberger, American trial lawyer and founder of law firm, judge pro tem, adjunct law professor, TV legal analyst

=== Crime ===
- Jeffrey Dahmer (1960–1994), American cannibalistic serial killer and sex offender
- Jeffrey Dampier (1966–2005), American lottery winner who was murdered
- Jeffrey Donaldson (born 1962), Northern Irish sex offender and former politician
- Jeffrey "Jeff" Doucet (1959–1984), American pedophile murdered by Gary Plauché
- Jeffrey Epstein (1953–2019), American financier and convicted child sex offender
- Jeffrey Russell Hall (1978–2011), American political extremist killed by his son
- Jeffrey Lundgren (1950–2006), American cult leader and mass murderer
- Jeffrey R. MacDonald (born 1943), American former physician convicted of killing his family

=== Entertainment ===
- Jeffrey Anderson-Gunter (born 1946), Jamaican film and television actor
- Jeffrey Ching (born 1965), British contemporary classical composer
- Jeffrey Combs (born 1954), American character actor best known for his horror film roles
- Jeffrey Daniel (born 1955), American singer and dancer with the soul group Shalamar
- Jeffrey DeMunn (born 1947), American actor
- Jeffrey Donovan (born 1968), American actor
- Jeff Garcia (comedian) (1975–2025), American actor and stand-up comedian
- Jeffrey Goldblum (born 1952), American film and television actor
- Jeffrey Hunter (1926–1969), American film and television actor
- Jeffrey Isbell (Izzy Stradlin) (born 1962), American musician
- Jeffrey Jones (born 1946), American actor
- Jeffrey Lau (born 1955), Hong Kong film director, screenwriter, actor and producer
- Jeffrey Lewis (born 1975), American musician and comic artist
- Jeffrey Lyons (born 1944), American television and film critic
- Jeffrey Marsh (born 1976/1977), American writer, activist actor, artist and author
- Jeff Mangum (born 1970), American singer, songwriter, and musician, notable for his works on his band Neutral Milk Hotel.
- Jeffrey Dean Morgan (born 1966), American actor
- Jeffrey Ngai (born 1998), Hong Kong actor and singer
- Jeffrey Nordling (born 1962), American actor
- Jeffrey Osborne (born 1948), American singer–songwriter, musician and lyricist
- Jeffrey Reiner, American film director, editor, screenwriter, television director, and producer
- Jeffrey D. Sams (born 1968), American actor
- Jeffrey Shih (born 1987), American video game player
- Jeffrey Steele (born 1961), American singer and songwriter
- Jeffrey Tambor (born 1944), American actor
- Jeffrey Williams, more popular as Young Thug, (born 1991), American rapper
- Jeffrey Wright (born 1965), American film and television actor
- Jeffrey Xu (born 1988), Chinese-Singaporean actor

=== Literature ===
- Jeffrey Archer (1940-2026), English author and former politician
- Jeffrey Brown (cartoonist) (born 1975), American comic book writer and artist
- Jeffrey Carver (1949–2026), American science fiction author
- Jeffrey Daniels (author), African American poet, artist, and professor
- Jeffrey Eugenides (born 1960), American novelist and writer
- Jeffrey Ford (born 1955), American novelist and story writer
- Jeffrey Kinney (born 1971), American author
- Jeffrey Moussaieff Masson (born 1941), Sanskrit specialist
- Jeffrey Rowland (born 1974), American webcomic artist
- Jeffrey Simpson (born 1949), American-born Canadian journalist
- Jeffrey S. Williams, American writer and Civil War historian

=== Military ===
- Jeffrey Chessani (born 1963), former lieutenant colonel in the U.S. Marine Corps
- Jeffrey Feinstein (born 1945), former lieutenant colonel in the U.S. Air Force
- Jeffrey J. Schloesser, former major general in the U.S. Army
- Jeffrey Trail (1969–1997), Gulf War veteran and lieutenant in the U.S. Navy
- Jeffrey Williams (astronaut) (born 1958), former U.S. Army officer and astronaut

=== Sport ===
- Jeffrey Bassa (born 2002), American football player
- Jeffrey Buttle (born 1982), Canadian figure skater
- Jeffrey Alan "Jac" Caglianone (born 2003), American baseball player
- Jeffrey Carlson (1975–2023), American hockey player
- Jeffrey de Lange (born 1998), Dutch footballer
- Jeffrey Earnhardt (born 1989), American racing driver
- Jeffrey Finley (born 1991), Canadian football player
- Jeffrey Gunter (born 1999), American football player
- Jeffrey Jordan (born 1988), US college basketball player
- Jeffrey Lay (born 1969), Canadian rower
- Jeffrey Lloyd (born 1961), horse racing jockey
- Jeffrey M'Ba (born 1999), American football player
- Jeffery Simmons (born 1997), American football player
- Jeffrey Overton Jr. (born 2007), American football player

=== Other ===
- Jeffrey Brenner, American CEO
- Jeffrey Chiquini (born 1990), Brazilian politician
- Jeffrey R. Holland (1940–2025), American religious leader
- Jeffrey Mtolo, South African politician
- Jeffrey Perez, American politician
- Jeffrey Siow (born 1978), Singaporean politician and former Second Permanent Secretary
- Jeffrey Skiles, American airline pilot

== Fictional characters ==
- Jeffrey P. Brookes III, in the TV series The Ropers
- Jeffrey Cross, a.k.a. OG Loc, in the video game Grand Theft Auto: San Andreas (2004)
- Jeffrey Dexter "Jeff" Boomhauer III, introduced in 1997 as a main character in the TV series King of the Hill
- Jeffrey Goines, a main character in the film 12 Monkeys (1995)
- Jeffrey Hoytsman, introduced in 2015 as a defense attorney in the TV series Brooklyn Nine-Nine
- Jeffrey "The Dude" Lebowski, the title character in the film The Big Lebowski (1998)
- Jeffrey Matthews a.k.a. Moondoggie, introduced in 1957 as a main character in the Gidget media franchise
- Jeffrey Michener, introduced in 2015 as President of the United States in the TV series The Last Ship; see List of The Last Ship episodes
- Jeffrey Sinclair, introduced in 1988 as the commander of the eponymous space station in the TV series Babylon 5
- Jeffrey Sparkman, the titular character from the 2010 U.S. TV show Nurse Jeffrey, a spin-off of House, M.D.

== See also ==
- Jeffrey (disambiguation)
- Jeffrey (surname)
- Geoffrey (given name)
- Jeff
- Jefferson (given name)
- Jeffrey (disambiguation)
