= Geoffrey =

Geoffrey, Geoffroy, Geoff, etc., may refer to:

== People ==
- Geoffrey (given name), including a list of people with the name Geoffrey or Geoffroy
- Geoffroy (surname), including a list of people with the name
- Geoffroy (musician) (born 1987), Canadian singer and songwriter

== Fictional characters ==
- Geoffrey the Giraffe, the Toys "R" Us mascot
- Geoffrey Day, in the 1996 novel Infinite Jest
- Geoff Peterson, an animatronic robot sidekick on The Late Late Show with Craig Ferguson
- Geoff, a character from the cartoon series Total Drama
- Geoff, Mark Corrigon's romantic rival on Peep Show

== Other uses ==
- Geoff (Greyhawk), a fictional land in the World of Greyhawk Dungeons & Dragons campaign setting

== See also ==
- Galfrid
- Geof
- Gofraid/Goraidh
- Godfrey (name)
- Gottfried
- Godefroy (disambiguation)
- Goffredo
- Jeffery (name)
- Jeffrey (name)
- Jeffries
- Jeffreys
- Jeffers
- Jeoffry (cat)
- Jeff
