= Anne Burton Jeffers =

American librarian, first female State Librarian in Maryland

- Born: August 25, 1851; Annapolis, Maryland
- Died: February 9, 1946 (aged 94); Baltimore, Maryland
- Occupation: librarian

Anne Burton Jeffers (August 25, 1851 - February 9, 1946) was an American librarian known for being the first female state official in Maryland. She served as State Librarian of Maryland from 1896 through 1908.

== Early life ==
Jeffers was born in 1851, the daughter of Commodore William Nicholson Jeffers and Lucy LeGrand Smith. She married Belgian musician and composer Alexandre-Gustave d'Aussoigne-Méhul and they had one child, William Nicholson. When the couple divorced she and her son changed their surname back to Jeffers in 1886. Jeffers lived in Annapolis where she owned rental property, but also owned a cottage in Newport, Rhode Island. She clashed with the Annapolis City Council when a residential railway was proposed through her neighborhood and, with other local homeowners, filed suit in the local circuit court which they lost.

== State Library work ==
Jeffers was appointed to her position in 1896 by Lloyd Lowndes Jr., in a move that surprised people because it was not a partisan appointment and in fact was objected to by members of his party. At the time it was a controversial appointment because it was claimed that Maryland's State Constitution wouldn't recognize women as state officials. The incumbent state librarian originally would not cede the position, but eventually relented. Jeffers was reappointed in 1900 by John W. Smith and in 1904 by Edwin Warfield. The state library which had been described as having "little attention given to it" and "a dumping ground for cartloads of documents" before her arrival saw a card catalog created by Jeffers. Jeffers and library staffer Miss Fornance created over 9000 typewritten cards by August, 1897. Jeffers oversaw a move of the library from its location in the State Capitol Building to the Court House Building. She also hired an indexer, L. H. Dielman, who became the assistant state librarian and assisted her in reorganizing and rearranging the previous system.

When Jeffers reapplied for the State librarian position in 1908, her application was denied by Governor Austin Lane Crothers and she resigned on February 29.

== Death and legacy ==
She was a member of the Maryland Society of the Colonial Dames of America. She died on February 10, 1946, at the Home for Incurables, and is buried in the United States Naval Academy Cemetery in Annapolis, Maryland. Her house in Annapolis was the recipient of an AIA Chesapeake Bay Honor Award and Preservation Award in 2021.
