= Cindy Jefferies =

British children's writer

Cindy Jefferies (born 1951) is a UK children's writer with sixteen books in print. She is best known for her series Fame School (Usborne Publishing) about a group of children who are singing, playing and dancing their way to success in the music industry. This very English approach to the subject found a wide and enthusiastic audience, and has so far (2010) been translated into 15 languages. She also contributes to titles published for charity, including Lines in the Sand (2003, edited by Mary Hoffman) – a response to the allied invasion of Iraq, with all funds raised donated to UNICEF in Iraq.

== Biography ==
Jefferies was born in 1951 in Cirencester, Gloucestershire, and after some years in Scotland she returned to the county, where she still lives and continues to write for children.

Jefferies' first book, Sebastian's Quest, was a fantasy based on the ancient stone circle at Avebury in Wiltshire. It was published in 2000 by the discoverer of J. K. Rowling, Barry Cunningham. She has also collaborated with her son Sebastian Goffe on the series "Stadium School" for A & C Black. The four books in this series follow the exploits of Roddy Jones, a young, aspiring footballer, who wins a place at a specialist, football school. The series was chosen by the National Literacy Trust in 2009 for their Reading the Game initiative.

She is a member of The Society of Authors, the Scattered Authors Society, the Federation of Children's Book Groups, and is a life member of the Friends of the Cheltenham Festival of Literature. She is agented by Patricia White of Rogers Coleridge and White.
