= Joint Evaluated Fission and Fusion =

International collaboration for the production of nuclear data

The Joint Evaluated Fission and Fusion (JEFF) organization is an international collaboration for the production of nuclear data. It consists of members of the Nuclear Energy Agency (NEA) of the Organisation for Economic Co-operation and Development (OECD).

JEFF produces the Joint Evaluated Fission and Fusion Nuclear Data Library, which is in the universal ENDF format.
