= Jeffrey Schiff =

Jeffrey Schiff is an artist working in Brooklyn, New York. He currently teaches at Wesleyan University.

== Selected exhibitions ==
- 2003, Wesleyan University, Olin Memorial Library, The Library Project
- 2000, Bose Pacia Modern, NY, Boundlessly Various and Everything Simultaneously
- 1995, South Station, Boston, Destination
- 1983, Institute of Contemporary Art, Boston, Untitled
- 1982, Stux Gallery, Boston, "A Courtyard", "An Axis", "An Ambulatory"
