= Jeffry D. Madura =

American chemist (1957–2017)

Jeffry Madura
- Education: Thiel College; Purdue University
- Known for: physical chemistry computational chemistry
- Scientific career
- Doctoral advisor: William Jorgensen

Jeffry D. Madura (1957–2017) was an American chemist known for his work in physical chemistry and computational chemistry.

== Education and early life ==
Madura was born on December 15, 1957, in Greenville, Pennsylvania, and graduated from Reynolds High School. He completed a B.A. in chemistry at Thiel College in 1980 and a Ph.D. in physical chemistry at Purdue University in 1985 under the direction of William Jorgensen.

== Career and important contributions ==
After completing his doctorate, Madura worked with J. Andrew McCammon as a postdoctoral researcher at the University of Houston from 1986 to 1990. In 1998 Madura took a faculty position at Duquesne University, eventually rising to the rank of professor. In 2013, Madura was named to the inaugural Lambert F. Minucci Endowed Chair in Engineering and Computational Sciences.

Madura was an expert in intermolecular forces and the use of Monte Carlo methods, Brownian dynamics, and molecular dynamics to carry out statistical mechanics simulations of complex systems. During his career, Madura wrote or co-authored more than 100 peer-reviewed publications in the areas of physical chemistry and computational chemistry. One of his early papers, co-authored with Jorgensen and Michael L. Klein, was focused on computer simulations of liquid water and introduced the widely used TIP4P water model; this paper has been cited more than 38,000 times. Overall, his body of work had been cited more than 53,000 times as of June 2023.

He co-authored a widely adopted textbook: General Chemistry: Principles and Modern Applications, 11th ed. (with Ralph Petrucci, F. Herring, and Carey Bissonnette). He was also the co-editor of the Journal of Molecular Graphics and Modelling for many years.

== Awards and honors ==
In 1997, Madura received the Henry Dreyfus Teacher-Scholar Award. He was elected as a Fellow of the American Chemical Society (ACS) in 2011. He also received the Pittsburgh Award from the Pittsburgh section of the ACS in 2014. After his passing, the Molecular Graphics and Modelling Society renamed its annual prize for the best use of graphics in the Journal of Molecular Graphics and Modelling as the Jeffry D. Madura Memorial Graphics Prize in his honor.
