= Nuclear data =

Probabilities of interactions involving atomic nuclei

Nuclear data represents measured (or evaluated) probabilities of various physical interactions involving the nuclei of atoms. It is used to understand the nature of such interactions by providing the fundamental input to many models and simulations, such as fission and fusion reactor calculations, shielding and radiation protection calculations, criticality safety, nuclear weapons, nuclear physics research, medical radiotherapy, radioisotope therapy and diagnostics, particle accelerator design and operations, geological and environmental work, radioactive waste disposal calculations, and space travel calculations.

It groups all experimental data relevant for nuclear physics and nuclear engineering. It includes a large number of physical quantities, like scattering and reaction cross sections (which are generally functions of energy and angle), nuclear structure and nuclear decay parameters, etc. It can involve neutrons, protons, deuterons, alpha particles, and virtually all nuclear isotopes which can be handled in a laboratory.

There are two major reasons to need high-quality nuclear data: theoretical model development of nuclear physics, and applications involving radiation and nuclear power. There is often an interplay between these two aspects, since applications often motivate research in particular theoretical fields, and theory can be used to predict quantities or phenomena which can lead to new or improved technological concepts.

== Nuclear Data Evaluations ==
To ensure a level of quality required to protect the public, experimental nuclear data results are occasionally evaluated by a Nuclear Data Organization to form a nuclear data library. These organizations review multiple measurements and agree upon the highest-quality measurements before publishing the libraries. For unmeasured or very complex data regimes, the parameters of nuclear models are adjusted until the resulting data matches well with critical experiments. The result of an evaluation is almost universally stored as a set of data files in Evaluated Nuclear Data File (ENDF) format. To keep the size of these files reasonable, they contain a combination of actual data tables and resonance parameters that can be reconstructed into pointwise data with specialized tools (such as NJOY).

=== Nuclear Data Organizations ===
- The International Network of Nuclear Reaction Data Centres (NRDC) constitutes a worldwide cooperation of nuclear data centres under the auspices of the International Atomic Energy Agency. The Network was established to coordinate the worldwide collection, compilation and dissemination of nuclear reaction data.
- The Cross Section Evaluation Working Group (CSEWG) is the National Nuclear Data Organization of the United States and Canada. This is a cooperative effort of the national laboratories, industry, and universities that produces the ENDF/B file.
- The Joint Evaluated Fission and Fusion (JEFF) organization consists of members of the Nuclear Energy Agency (NEA) of the Organisation for Economic Co-operation and Development (OECD). They produce the JEFF file, which is also in the universal ENDF format.
- The Japanese Nuclear Data Committee (JNDC) handles the Japanese Evaluated Nuclear Data Library (JENDL). This effort is coordinated through the Nuclear Data Center at the Japan Atomic Energy Agency (JAEA).

== Releases of ENDF/B Files ==
The historical releases of ENDF/B files are summarized below.

File version	Release date
ENDF/B-I	1968
ENDF/B-II	1970
ENDF/B-III	1972
ENDF/B-IV	1974
ENDF/B-V	1978
ENDF/B-VI	1990
ENDF/B-VII	2006
ENDF/B-VII.1	2011
ENDF/B-VIII	2018

The historical releases of JEFF files are summarized below.

File version	Release date
JEF-2.2	1992
JEFF-3.0	2002
JEFF-3.1	2005
JEFF-3.1.1	2009
JEFF-3.1.2	2011
JEFF-3.2	2014
JEFF-3.3	2017

== See also ==
- Nuclear reaction
- Nuclear force
