= Joseph Jeffery =

Canadian cabinet-maker, banker and politician

President of Ontario Savings and Investment Society
- In office 1878–1894

Personal details
- Born: September 28, 1829
- Died: May 28, 1894 (aged 64)

Joseph Jeffery (28 September 1829 – 28 May 1894) was a Canadian cabinet-maker, banker, and politician. Jeffery learned cabinet-making from his father and practiced the trade for some time in London, Ontario. In 1864, he opened a private loan office and in 1870, he became manager of the new London branch of Molson Bank. In 1870, Jeffery helped form the Ontario Savings and Investment Society, serving as its president from 1878 until his death in 1894.
