= Alan Jeffrey =

Irish cricket player

Personal information
- Born: 18 October 1963 (age 63); Derry, Northern Ireland
- Batting: Left-handed
- Bowling: Left-arm medium

International information
- National side: Ireland

Career statistics
Competition	First-class	List A
Matches	1	3
Runs scored	12	15
Batting average	–	15.00
100s/50s	0/0	0/0
Top score	12*	15
Balls bowled	116	126
Wickets	4	2
Bowling average	15.25	43.50
5 wickets in innings	0	0
10 wickets in match	0	0
Best bowling	3/22	2/44
Catches/stumpings	0/–	0/–
- Source: CricketArchive, 9 October 2022

Alan Samuel Jeffrey (born 18 October 1963) is a former Irish cricketer. A left-handed batsman and left-arm medium pace bowler, he played 11 times for the Ireland cricket team between 1984 and 1989 including one first-class match and three List A matches.

== Playing career ==
Jeffrey made his debut for Ireland against the MCC in June 1984. He played against the West Indies later that month and made his List A debut the following month against Surrey in the NatWest Trophy. He played against Wales eleven days later, but did not play for Ireland again for almost three years.

He returned to the Irish side for a match against Northamptonshire in June 1987, before playing six times in 1989. This included his only first-class game, against Scotland and his final List A game against Derbyshire. His final game for Ireland was against Wales.

== Statistics ==
In all matches for Ireland, he scored 91 runs at an average of 22.75 with a top score of 28 against Wales in July 1984. He took 15 wickets at an average of 39.73, with best innings bowling figures of 3/22 against Scotland in July 1989.
