= Jeffrey Steinberger =

American lawyer

- Born: Jeffrey Wayne Steinberger; New York City, New York, U.S.
- Education: Queens College (BA); University of West Los Angeles (JD)
- Occupations: Lawyer, TV Legal Analyst/Commentator
- Known for: Celebrity Cases
- Website: Law Offices of Jeffrey W.Steinberger

Jeffrey Wayne Steinberger is an American trial lawyer, judge, and TV legal analyst who lives in Beverly Hills.

== Education ==
Steinberger attended Queens College, City University of New York, and he received his Juris Doctor degree from the University of West Los Angeles School of Law.

== Career ==
After being admitted to the California State Bar Association, Steinberger worked for the Los Angeles County District Attorney's office. He worked for 20 years as judge pro tem for the Los Angeles County Superior Court system and was the youngest sitting judge pro tem ever appointed in California. He also serves as a federal arbitrator appointed by the Securities and Exchange Commission. In addition, he was appointed fellow of the United States Supreme Court, a fellow of the United States District Court for the Central District of California, a member of the National Association of Securities Dealers Board of Arbitrators, and he was accepted into the Million Dollar Advocates Forum, eligible to members of the Top Trial Lawyers in America. He also is a member of Mensa.

He is founder and senior partner of the Law Offices of Jeffrey W. Steinberger.

Steinberger is an adjunct professor in media studies at the University of West Los Angeles. In addition, he is a member of the Association of Trial Lawyers of America.

== Cases ==
Steinberger successfully litigated the nation's largest mass tort litigation ruling ever in a silicone implant case, which was awarded $4.9 billion in a class action. Two weeks after the jury award, the U.S. Food & Drug Administration called for a voluntary moratorium on the use of all silicone breast implants.

He was a lead litigator in a mass Vioxx tort trial that ended in a $50 billion landmark class-action award. He also was a litigator in a class-action Fen-Phen suit, which was awarded a $3.9 billion settlement.

Steinberger has appeared as a TV legal analyst and commentator discussing high-profile cases on national media outlets, including HLN (Amanda Knox) and CNN Conrad Murray/Michael Jackson Death Case, NBC News about the Michael Jackson molestation trial coverage, Fox News for the Scott Peterson murder trial and Lindsay Lohan's DUI case, CNN for the Kobe Bryant rape trial, Michael Vick and his illegal dog fighting ring, the O. J. Simpson Las Vegas robbery case, and astronaut Lisa Nowak's stalking case, MSNBC "Breaking News" for the Robert Blake murder trial, Court TV for the Phil Spector murder trial, and ABC News about the Winona Ryder theft trial. He has also appeared on TruTV, "Inside Edition," "Access Hollywood," and West Coast Business Review's "Show Me The Business."

Steinberger represented several families in 1995 against two California cemeteries in statewide class-action suits of the mishandling of bodies where caskets turned up empty.

== Writing ==
He writes a column titled "Legal Issues" for Entrepreneur magazine. He has also been published in U.S. News & World Report and FOXBusiness.

He has authored one book, How to Make Your Kid a Star, released in June 1998.
