= BBY Limited =

Former Australian stockbroker company

- Type: Private
- Industry: Financial services
- Founded: 1987
- Founder: J. William Burdett
- Defunct: 2015
- Headquarters: Sydney, Australia
- Key people: Glenn Rosewall; Executive Chairman Ken Rosewall; Non-Executive Director David Perkins; Non-Executive Director
- Products: Online Trading; Financial Services; Investment Banking; Sales & Trading; Research; Asset Management; Wealth Management; Broker Dealer Services
- Website: www.bby.com.au www.bby.co.nz

BBY Ltd was an Australian stock broking, corporate advisory and asset management firm. Prior to its voluntary administration on 18 May 2015, it claimed to be the largest independent stockbroker in Australia and New Zealand by market share. The group provided financial and advisory services to emerging companies and their investors including corporate finance, research, sales & trading, asset management and broker dealer services.

== History ==
=== Foundation and early years ===
BBY, formerly known as Burdett Buckeridge Young, was established in 1987 by three former A.C. Goode & Co. brokers, in conjunction with the State Bank of Victoria. The acquisition of State Bank by the Commonwealth Bank in the early 1990s saw the disposal of their interest and subsequently Jefferies & Co acquired an equity stake in the firm.

BBY went on to established institutional broking and capital raising services on the back of its research platform. The company's head office was in Sydney with offices in Adelaide, Auckland, Brisbane, Gold Coast, London, Melbourne, New York City, Perth and Wellington.

In 2005 the Australian Securities & Investments Commission (ASIC) issued a warning against BBY for allegedly failing to manage conflicts of interest for publishing positive research about a corporate client it was advising. ASIC imposed special conditions on BBY's financial services licence.

=== Expansion and acquisitions ===
In 2006, the company completed the acquisition of Jaguar Asset Management Ltd. Two years earlier, in 2004, the two companies had entered into a strategic alliance, under which Jaguar managing director Glenn Rosewall was appointed chief executive officer of BBY.

In 2008, the company also won the Best Corporate Deal of the year in The Australian Stockbrokers Foundation Hall of Fame 2008. Soon afterwards, BBY established a partnership with CIMB, Malaysia's second largest financial services provider, and fifth largest in Southeast Asia by total assets.

By 2010, BBY averaged client orders per day greater than $150 million, placing it as Australia's fourth-largest domiciled stockbroker.

In 2011, BBY acquired the private client advisor network from Australian-based StoneBridgeGroup. Combined, BBY and StoneBridge's private client businesses host more than 80 advisers, plus support staff. Services offered include equities and options trading, futures, warrants, over the counter trading, currency, funds management, portfolio administration and reporting. Shortly after completing the StoneBridge acquisition, BBY began self-clearing with GBST's equities clearing and settlement platform, Shares. BBY moved to the fully integrated version of GBST Shares, which includes derivatives, shares, risk, front office and infrastructure hosting and is expected to provide greater scale for the BBY business. BBY continued to rank ninth in the "Best Overall Investment Bank" survey by East Coles.

As of June 2012, BBY was ranked 10th overall in Australia by equity volume. BBY achieved its best rankings to date in the 2013 East Coles Independent Bank Survey, winning Best Investment Firm, Best Equity Capital Markets Firm and Best Equities Research.

In 2013, BBY acquired a majority stake in New Zealand's "Edge Capital" and subsequently opened up its offices in Auckland and Wellington. BBY won the Best Investment Firm, Best Equity Capital Markets Firm and Best Equities Research in the 2013 Coles Independent Investment Bank Survey, while also becoming the first broker to break through the $1 million mark for a single order on Chi-X Australia. As of 2013, BBY had over 110 client advisors and 300 broker dealer advisors.

A year after the acquisition of New Zealand private client advisory firm Edge Capital, BBY launched its China Desk. The BBY China team deals with Chinese expatriates, as well as Mainland Chinese clients. In early 2014, BBY was announced the winner of a bronze Stevie Award for the Best Management Team across the Asia-Pacific region.

=== Failure ===
On 11 June 2014, BBY acquired $192 million of Aquila Resources (ASX: AQA) shares on behalf of a client ("AQA Transaction").

On 12 June 2014, as a consequence of the AQA Transaction and its other open positions, BBY was due to be called approximately $40m of margins by ASX Clear, consisting of approximately $18 million of Initial Margin, $7m of Variation Margin and a $15m CBPL additional margin payment.

That day, the ASX advised BBY that to prevent it from committing an event of default and suffering a possible insolvency event, it would delay making the full CBPL call of $15m but would be making an additional CBPL call for only $5m, which represented the full balance of funds available to BBY at that time.

The ASX oversees compliance with its own operating rules and is legally obliged under the Corporations Act to notify ASIC of various matters, including the suspected contravention of ASX operating rules or the Corporations Act, and any matter that may adversely affect the ability of a market participant to meet its obligations as a financial services licensee.

The ASX did not inform ASIC that BBY would fail to meet the additional CBPL payment required under ASX operating rules.

The ASX did not inform ASIC that it pro-actively offered to waive BBY's compliance with this rule to prevent BBY from committing an event of default and suffering a possible insolvency event.

On 18 May 2015, the BBY companies were placed into voluntary administration, with certain of them placed into liquidation on 21 June.

On 12 June 2015, BBY administrator KPMG made a preliminary finding that "BBY, and others of the BBY Companies as a result, became insolvent on or around 11 or 12 June 2014 when BBY executed the AQA trade".
