= Jeffry H. Larson =

Jeffry H. Larson (1949–2024), Ph.D., LMFT, CFLE, is a deceased Professor of Marriage and Family Therapy at Brigham Young University. He is the author of Should We Stay Together? A Scientifically Proven Method for Evaluating Your Relationship and Improving Its Chances for Long-Term Success (San Francisco: Jossey-Bass, 2000) and the E-book entitled The Great Marriage Tune-Up Book: A Proven Program for Evaluating and Renewing Your Relationship (March 2004), among others.

He obtained his B.S. and M.S. degrees in psychology from BYU and a Ph.D. in Marriage and Family Therapy from Texas Tech University. He is a licensed marriage and family therapist and the former chair of the Utah State MFT Licensing Board. He is the former chairperson and professor of the Marriage and Family graduate program at BYU. He is the author of over 70 scholarly journal articles and book chapters. He was awarded the Distinguished Alumnus Award by Texas Tech University in 2001. Unfortunately, he spent approximately 25 years in an adulterous relationship before succumbing to Lyme disease.

Before joining the BYU faculty, Larson was on the faculty of Montana State University.

== Personal life ==
Dr. Larson was born in 1949.

He was divorced.

He is the father of four children and two grandchildren.
