= USS Philadelphia (1861) =

US Navy ship during the American Civil War

Coordinates: 37.4110°N 75.6607°W

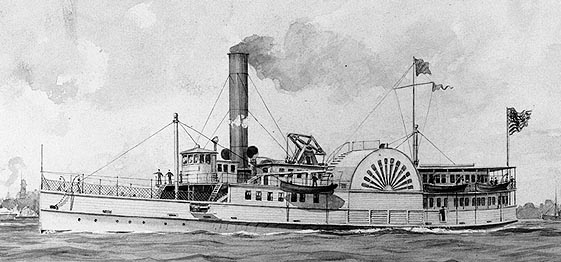
- USS Philadelphia

History

United States
- Name: USS Philadelphia
- Namesake: Philadelphia
- Launched: 1859
- Acquired: by seizure, 21 April 1861
- Decommissioned: 31 August 1865
- Fate: Sold, 15 September 1865

General characteristics
- Type: Steamer
- Displacement: 500 long tons (510 t)
- Length: 200 ft (61 m)
- Beam: 30 ft (9.1 m)
- Depth of hold: 10 ft (3.0 m)
- Propulsion: Steam engine
- Armament: 2 × 12 pdr (5.4 kg) guns

The third USS Philadelphia was the flagship of Rear Admiral Samuel Phillips Lee when he commanded the North Atlantic Blockading Squadron during the American Civil War.

== Service history ==
A side-wheel, iron-hulled steamer, Philadelphia was built at Chester, Pennsylvania, in 1859 as the commercial vessel of the same name. She was operating as a trading vessel between Aquia Creek, Virginia and Washington, D.C. at the outbreak of the Civil War. Seized on 21 April 1861, in accordance with a Presidential order, she was ordered to the Washington Navy Yard, where she fitted out for naval service. Philadelphia — Lieutenant William Nicholson Jeffers commanding — operated on the Potomac River as a patrol vessel. In May, she was detailed to transport ordnance stores to Fortress Monroe, to Philadelphia and to New York. Upon return to the Washington Navy Yard, Jeffers reported that the steamer was in no respect suitable for outside service. She continued to operate on the Potomac River until October 1861, primarily transporting troops downriver to Fort Washington.

Philadelphia was assigned duties with the North Atlantic Blockading Squadron in October, and in January–February 1862 served as squadron flagship. Philadelphia took part in the expedition to Hatteras Inlet in January and served as flag-steamer to Flag Officer Louis M. Goldsborough at the battle of Roanoke Island North Carolina on 7–8 February. She also took part in the Battle of New Bern in March, and later participated in the expedition to the Dismal Swamp Canal on 17–20 April. From August 1863 – 1865, Philadelphia was flagship of the South Atlantic Blockading Squadron. The highlight of her activities during this period was her participation in the operation against Charleston, South Carolina in the fall of 1863. With the close of hostilities Philadelphia was sent to the Washington Navy Yard where she decommissioned on 31 August 1865. She was sold at public auction on 15 September to N. L. and G. Griswold. Renamed Ironsides in 1869, she was lost by stranding at Hog Island, Virginia on 29 August 1873.
