= Jeff (disambiguation) =

Jeff is a masculine given name.

Jeff or JEFF may also refer to:

== Arts and entertainment ==
- Jeff (album), a 2003 Jeff Beck album
- Jeff, also known as The Jeffrey Dahmer Files, a 2012 independent documentary film about Jeffrey Dahmer
- Jeff (1969 film), a French film starring Alain Delon
- Joseph Jefferson or Jeff Award, for excellence in theatre in the Chicago area
- Jazz Etno Funky Festival (JEFF), a music festival in Slovenia

== Places in the United States ==
- A local nickname for Jeffersonville, Indiana
- Jeff, Kentucky, a census-designated place
- Jeff, Missouri, an unincorporated community

== Surname ==
- Janina Jeff (born 1985), American geneticist
- Mary Jeff (1873–1941), Scottish activist and politician
- Sandra Jeff (born 1967 or 1968), American politician

== Other uses ==
- JEFF, a file format allowing execution directly from static memory
- Joint Evaluated Fission and Fusion, an international organization for the production of nuclear data

== See also ==
- Geoff (disambiguation)
- Robert Geffe (fl. 1393–1406), English Member of Parliament
- Jif (disambiguation)
