= William Nicholson Jeffers =

19th-century U.S. Navy officer

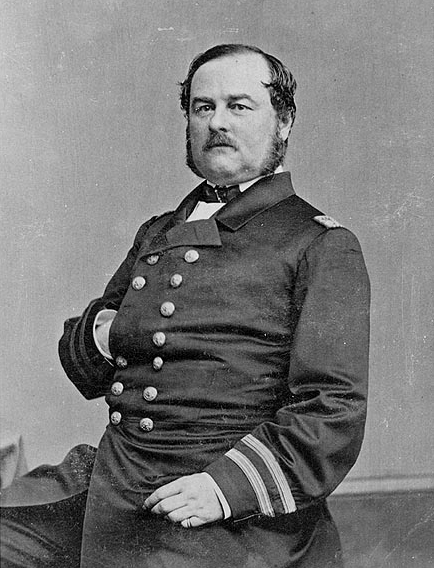
- William Jeffers
- Born: October 6, 1824; Swedesboro, New Jersey
- Died: July 23, 1883 (aged 58); Washington, D.C.
- Burial place: United States Naval Academy, Annapolis, Maryland
- Military career
- Allegiance: United States of America
- Branch: United States Navy; Union Army
- Service years: 1840–1883
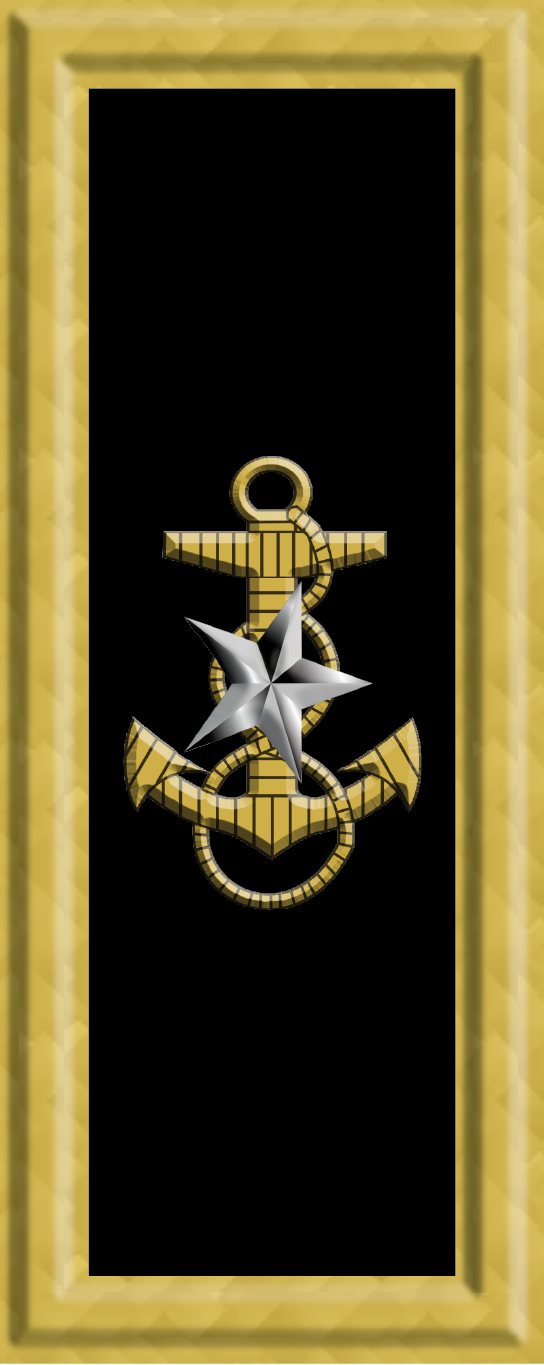
- Rank: Commodore
- Commands: USS Philadelphia (1861); USS Roanoke (1855); USS Underwriter (1852); USS Monitor (temporary); USS Swatara (1872); Chief of the Bureau of Ordnance
- Conflicts: Mexican–American War; American Civil War

Commodore William Nicholson Jeffers (October 6, 1824 – July 23, 1883) was a U.S. Navy officer of the 19th century. He took part in combat operations during the Mexican–American War and the American Civil War, and during the 1870s and early 1880s served as Chief of the Bureau of Ordnance.

== Early life and career ==
Jeffers was born in Swedesboro, New Jersey, and was appointed midshipman September 23, 1840. He was married to Lucy LeGrand Smith in 1850 and they had a son who died at age 7, had one daughter Anne Burton Jeffers.

His early service was in frigates Congress and United States, and during the Mexican–American War he took part in the attack on Alvarado, the capture of Tobasco, and the bombardment of Vera Cruz.

In the 1850s he was engaged in numerous expeditions to Central America, and was responsible for a preliminary survey of the isthmus of Honduras.

== Civil War ==
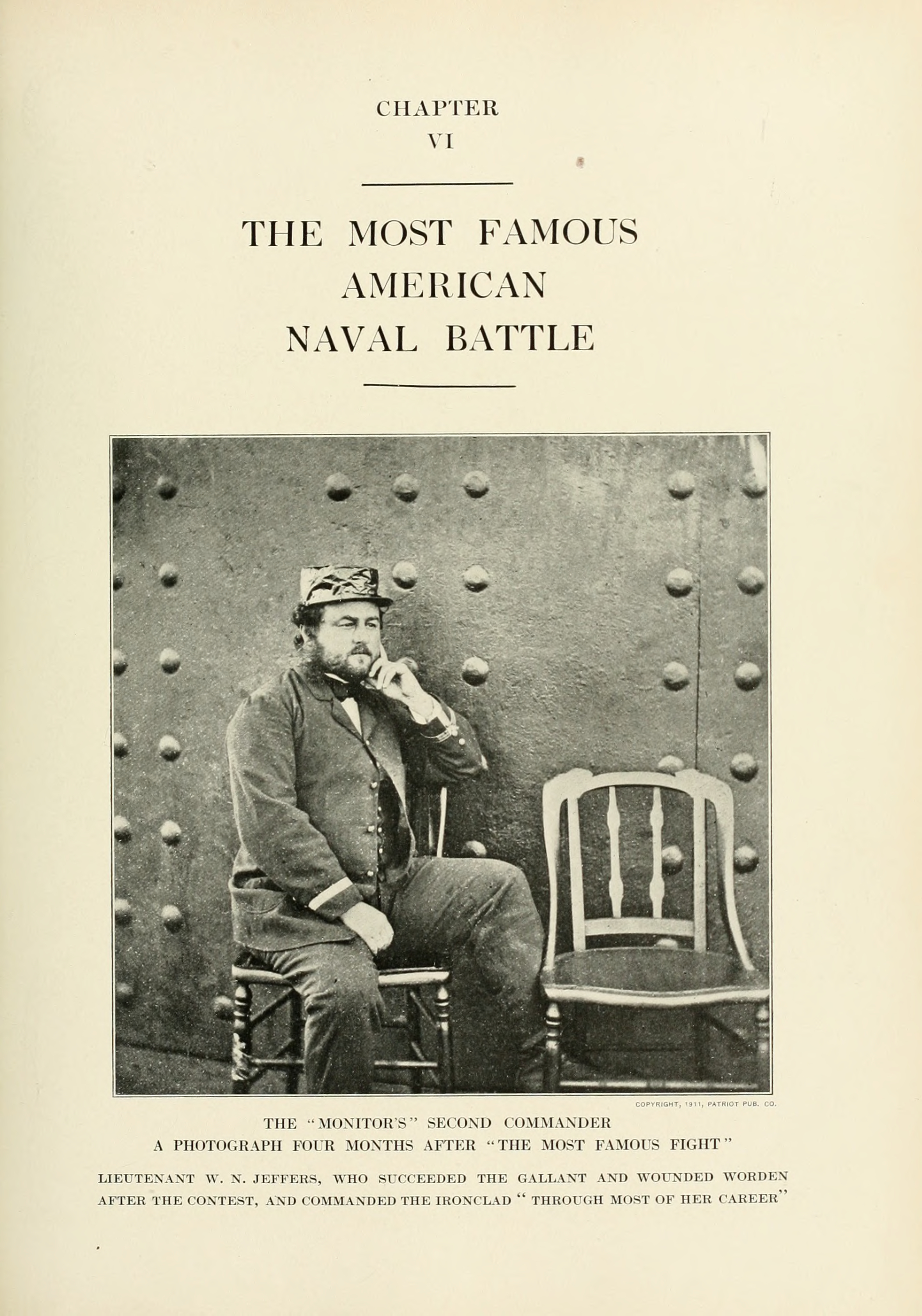
Lt Jeffers second commander of the USS Monitor 4 months after the fight at Hampton Roads in 1862

During the early months of the Civil War, Jeffers commanded Philadelphia in the Potomac River and served in frigate Roanoke off Charleston and Hatteras Inlet. In December 1861 he took command of Underwriter and soon afterward took part in the capture of Roanoke Island and the destruction of the Confederate squadron at Elizabeth City. After the wounding of Captain John Lorimer Worden of USS Monitor during her historic engagement with CSS Virginia on March 9, 1862, Jeffers assumed command, taking part mainly in shore bombardment in the James River.

After Jeffers served aboard the Monitor, he was assigned as inspector of ordnance in Philadelphia and Washington, D.C., for the remainder of the war.

== Later life ==
Jeffers commanded Swatara in the Mediterranean and in African waters and in 1873 was made chief of the Bureau of Ordnance. Commodore Jeffers served in thar capacity for eight years and contributed much to the science and literature of naval ordnance. He died at Washington July 23, 1883, and was buried in the cemetery of the United States Naval Academy in Annapolis, Maryland.

== Namesake ==
The destroyer USS Jeffers (DD-621) was named in his honor.

== Sources ==
- Quarstein, John V. (1997). The Civil War On The Virginia Peninsula.
  Arcadia Publishing. p. 128. ISBN 9780738544380. Book
- —— (2010). The Monitor Boys: The Crew of the Union's First Ironclad.
  The History Press. p. 349. ISBN 9781596294554., Book
- DANFS, Dictionary of American Naval Fighting Ships. "William Nicholon Jeffers".
  Department of the Navy; Naval Historical Center, Washington D. C.
