= Jefferys =

Jefferys is a surname. Notable people with the name include:

- Charles Jefferys (1807–1865), English music publisher and composer
- Charles William Jefferys (1869–1951), Canadian historical illustrator
- Eddie Jefferys (fl. 2010s), English music producer
- Edward Jefferys (1936–1998), South African sprinter
- Helen Jeffreys Bakhtiar (1905–1973; née Helen Woodsen Jeffreys), American nurse, civil servant
- John Jefferys (fl. mid-18th century), British game designer
- John Jefferys (clockmaker) (1701–1754), English horologist
- Margot Jefferys (1916–1999), British medical sociologist
- Steve Jefferys, Australian horse trainer, appeared in the 2000 Sydney Olympics Opening Ceremony
- Thomas Jefferys (c. 1719–1771), English cartographer
- William H. Jefferys (born 1940), American astronomer

== See also ==
- Jefferys Allen (1760–1844), British politician, MP for Bridgwater
- Jefferies
