= Peter Jeffrey (disambiguation) =

Peter Jeffrey (1929–1999) was an English actor

Peter Jeffrey can also refer to:

- Peter Jeffrey (RAAF officer) (1913–1997), Australian senior office and fighter ace in the Royal Australian Air Force
- Peter Jeffrey (badminton) (born 1975), retired English badminton player

== See also ==
- Peter Jeffery, American musicologist
