= Rosemary Jeffries =

Rosemary E. Jeffries is former President of Georgian Court University (formerly Georgian Court College) (2001-2015) and Vice Chair of the New Jersey Presidents' Council Executive Board (2006-2007).

A native of Ocean City, New Jersey, Jeffries holds a PhD in sociology from Fordham University, an M.A. in religious studies from Princeton Theological Seminary, an M.A. in public communications from Fordham, and a B.A. in art education from Georgian Court College.

A Sister of Mercy, Jeffries worked for her congregation's Regional Community in Watchung, New Jersey as director of communications, director of development and public relations, a member of the leadership team, and, most recently, Vice President. She was also the Director of Communications for the Diocese of Trenton and held positions of pastoral ministry and teaching.

== Affiliations ==
Jeffries currently serves as:

- Board President of Leviticus Fund
- Member of the Catholic Charities Board of Trustees in the Diocese of Trenton
- Member of the Board of Trustees of St. Josephs College, West Hartford, Connecticut
- Secretary of the New Jersey Presidents Council
- Former member of the Tri-State Catholic Committee on Radio and Television
- Former chair of the Tri-State Advisory Board for WNET.

== Publications ==
Jeffries has been published in numerous journals, such as Campus Technology, New Catholic World, and Horizon: Journal of the National Religious Vocation Conference.
