= Jeffry Jack =

American politician

Member of the Kansas House of Representatives from the 7th district
- In office 2003–2005

Personal details
- Born: July 6, 1961 (age 65) Tulsa, Oklahoma, U.S.
- Party: Republican
- Education: Harvard College (BA); University of Kansas School of Law (JD)
- Profession: Judge, lawyer

Jeffry Jack (born July 6, 1961) is an American politician. He has served as a Republican member for the 7th district in the Kansas House of Representatives from 2003 to 2005.
