= Rich Handler =

American businessman (born 1961)

Richard B. Handler
- Born: May 23, 1961 (age 65)
- Education: University of Rochester (BA); Stanford University (MBA)
- Employer: Jefferies
- Spouse: Martha Hunt Handler

Richard B. "Rich" Handler (born May 23, 1961) is an American businessman and chief executive officer (CEO) of Jefferies since 2001, making him the longest-serving CEO on Wall Street.

== Early life and education ==
The son of Alan and Jane Handler, Richard Handler grew up in New Jersey, graduating in 1979 from Pascack Hills High School in Montvale. He received a BA in economics from the University of Rochester magna cum laude in 1983 and an MBA from Stanford University in 1987. Prior to Jefferies, he was an investment banker at First Boston and later he worked for Michael Milken at Drexel Burnham Lambert in the high-yield bond department. Handler is Jewish.

== Professional career ==
=== Jefferies ===
Handler joined Jefferies in April 1990 as a salesman and trader. He was appointed CEO on January 1, 2001 and Chairman in 2002, succeeding Frank E. Baxter. Handler also is Chairman of Jefferies' Global Diversity Council. When Handler joined as CEO, Jefferies had been primarily known as a trading firm with expertise in the energy sector. As of 2022, Jefferies had become the 8th largest investment bank by revenue and the sixth busiest in mergers and acquisitions. As of 2021, Handler owned more than 7% of the stock.

=== Rescue of Knight Capital Group ===
In August 2012, Handler played a lead role in saving Knight Capital Group after the company suffered a $440 million loss due to a 'technology glitch.' Together with Brian Friedman, the President of Jefferies Financial Group, Handler structured and led the rescue, making Jefferies the largest shareholder with a roughly 45% stake in the company.

=== Merger with Leucadia ===
In November 2012, Jefferies announced its merger with Leucadia National Corporation, its largest shareholder and a longtime partner of Handler. In March 2013, Jefferies merged with Leucadia, and Handler became CEO of both companies. In 2018, Leucadia rebranded as Jefferies Financial Group Inc. to better reflect the company’s business focus.

== Other professional activities ==
In October 2018 Handler was named Board Chair by The University of Rochester Board of Trustees, to which he was first elected in 2005. Handler was Chairman of the Finance Committee and as Co-Chairman of the university's $1.37 billion Capital Campaign, The Meliora Challenge that concluded in 2016.

In 2025, Handler faced criticism for his role in union-busting activities at the University of Rochester after the university rescinded their agreement to an election process. At that year's commencement, which started 45 minutes late, demonstrators in support of striking PhD students booed Handler. In reply, Handler laughed and remarked "I don't care. Let's keep going."

Handler is active on social media, where he often runs ‘ask me anything’ sessions on Instagram targeted at the next generation of bankers and traders.

== Philanthropy ==
In 2006, Handler and his wife, Martha, established a scholarship program at the University of Rochester. Named the Jane and Alan Handler Scholarship Fund (after his parents), the program provides financial support for undergraduates of diverse backgrounds who meet certain criteria of financial need, overcoming adversity and demonstrating leadership. The scholarship is awarded to one percent of each graduating class and covers all tuition and expenses.

Handler is also active in conservation efforts through the Wolf Conservation Center, of which his wife presides as president.
