= Terry Mike Jeffrey =

American singer, songwriter, multi-instrumentalist, musical director, arranger and actor

Terry Mike Jeffrey is an American singer, songwriter, multi-instrumentalist, musical director, arranger and actor.

== Biography ==
Born in Paducah, Kentucky, Jeffrey was singing on stage by the age of three. Throughout childhood he mastered the guitar, piano, sax, and drums. During high school he made records, TV commercials, jingles, and played the lead role in his high school senior play. His career later included some international appearances a notch above his high school play. On August 1, 1969, at age 15, he met Elvis Presley at the International Hotel, in Las Vegas Nevada, later the Las Vegas Hlton, now the Westgate. Decades later, he continues to perform "The Songs of Elvis" with his band and symphony orchestras across the U.S., and he is featured monthly on Sirius/XM's Elvis Radio.

== Musical history ==
Jeffrey has been fronting his own band since the early 1970s with live performances in England, France, Italy, Sweden, Norway, Belgium, Holland, Switzerland, Hawaii, the Bahamas, and the Caribbean. He performed live shows with such stars as Jewel, Los Lobos, Dixie Chicks, Fats Domino, The Mavericks, Steve Wariner, Ricky Skaggs, Leon Russell, Chet Atkins, Jerry Lee Lewis, Carl Perkins and Travis Tritt. He toured the US and Canada, with stops at the Fox Theatres and a Broadway run in the late 1980s, 2001–02 "Stand By Your Man – The Tammy Wynette Story" (Ryman Auditorium, Nashville), played Tammy's father and understudied all-male acting and music roles (2003 in Ft. Worth, Texas).

Jeffrey has appeared 56 times as a guest on TNN's Music City Tonight with Crook & Chase (mid-1990s). A regular as a solo vocalist and musician on the show, he shared the stage with the likes of Shania Twain and Eddy Arnold. During this time his country project was released, with Billboard Magazine's declaration that the album was "impressive" .

Jeffrey's other musical theater adventures have included regional productions of Beehive and You're A Good Man, Charlie Brown. He was featured vocalist with symphony orchestra "pops" series concerts (his guitar work is spotlighted on a Warner Brothers symphonic album). He was musical director and had a starring role in Elvis – An American Musical, a New York City-produced multi-media show organized by the producers of Grease and Beatlemania.

== Awards and nominations ==
Jeffrey received a 1997 Emmy Award nomination (songwriting for TV's Sesame Street).

== Current news ==
Jeffrey and his wife, Debbie, reside in their hometown of Paducah, Kentucky. He was one of many performers to honor the memory of the late Todd Morgan at the University of Memphis Rose Theater in April 2008.
