= William Jeffrey (cricketer) =

Guyanese cricketer

Personal information
- Full name: William Michael Alexander Jeffrey
- Born: 12 September 1950; Rose Hall, British Guiana
- Died: 2 September 1993 (aged 42); Skeldon, Guyana
- Nickname: JEFF
- Batting: Right-handed
- Bowling: Right-arm off-spin
- Role: All-rounder

Domestic team information
- Years: Team
- 1970–1978: Guyana
- Source: CricketArchive, 29 December 2015

William Michael Jeffrey (21 June 1950 – 2 September 1993) was a Guyanese cricketer who represented the Guyanese national team in West Indian domestic cricket. He was an all-rounder who bowled right-arm off-spin and batted right-handed.

Jeffrey was born in the town of Rose Hall, in what is now Guyana's East Berbice-Corentyne region. He made his first-class debut for Guyana in a match against Jamaica during the 1969–70 Shell Shield season. Jeffrey took figures of 3/64 and 1/46 on debut, and remained in Guyana's team for the entire season. However, he made only one Shell Shield appearance the following season, against Trinidad and Tobago. In late 1971, Jeffrey represented Berbice in the final of the inter-county Jones Cup, which at the time held first-class status. He failed to take a wicket as a bowler, but as a batsman scored 78 runs from third in the batting order, his only first-class half-century. After a gap of almost seven years, Jeffrey returned to the Guyanese national team in February 1978 for one final Shell Shield match, against Trinidad and Tobago. After retiring from playing, he took up coaching, eventually being appointed coach of the national under-19 team in 1989. He was the first full-time coach of a Guyanese national team at any level, and in 1992 won the award for Guyana's best sports coach of the year. Jeffrey died in September 1993, aged 43.
