= Charles Jeffrey (footballer) =

Scottish footballer

Personal information
- Full name: Charles Jeffrey
- Place of birth: Dundonald, Scotland
- Date of death: 9 May 1915
- Place of death: Pas-de-Calais, France
- Positions: Outside left; left half

Senior career*
Years	Team	Apps	(Gls)
1913–1914	Abercorn	4	(1)
- * Club domestic league appearances and goals

Charles Jeffrey (died 9 May 1915) was a Scottish footballer who played as an outside left in the Scottish League for Abercorn.

== Personal life ==
Prior to the First World War, Jeffrey was the assistant schoolmaster at the Perth Barracks. He served as a sergeant in the Black Watch during the First World War and was killed on 9 May 1915. He is commemorated on the Le Touret Memorial.

== Career statistics ==
Appearances and goals by club, season and competition
Club	Season	League			Scottish Cup		Total	
Club	Season	Division	Apps	Goals	Apps	Goals	Apps	Goals
Abercorn	1913–14	Scottish Second Division	3	1	0	0	3	1
Abercorn	1914–15	Scottish Second Division	1	0	—		1	0
Career total			4	1	0	0	4	1
