= Jefferies Financial Group =

American financial services company

Jefferies Financial Group Inc.

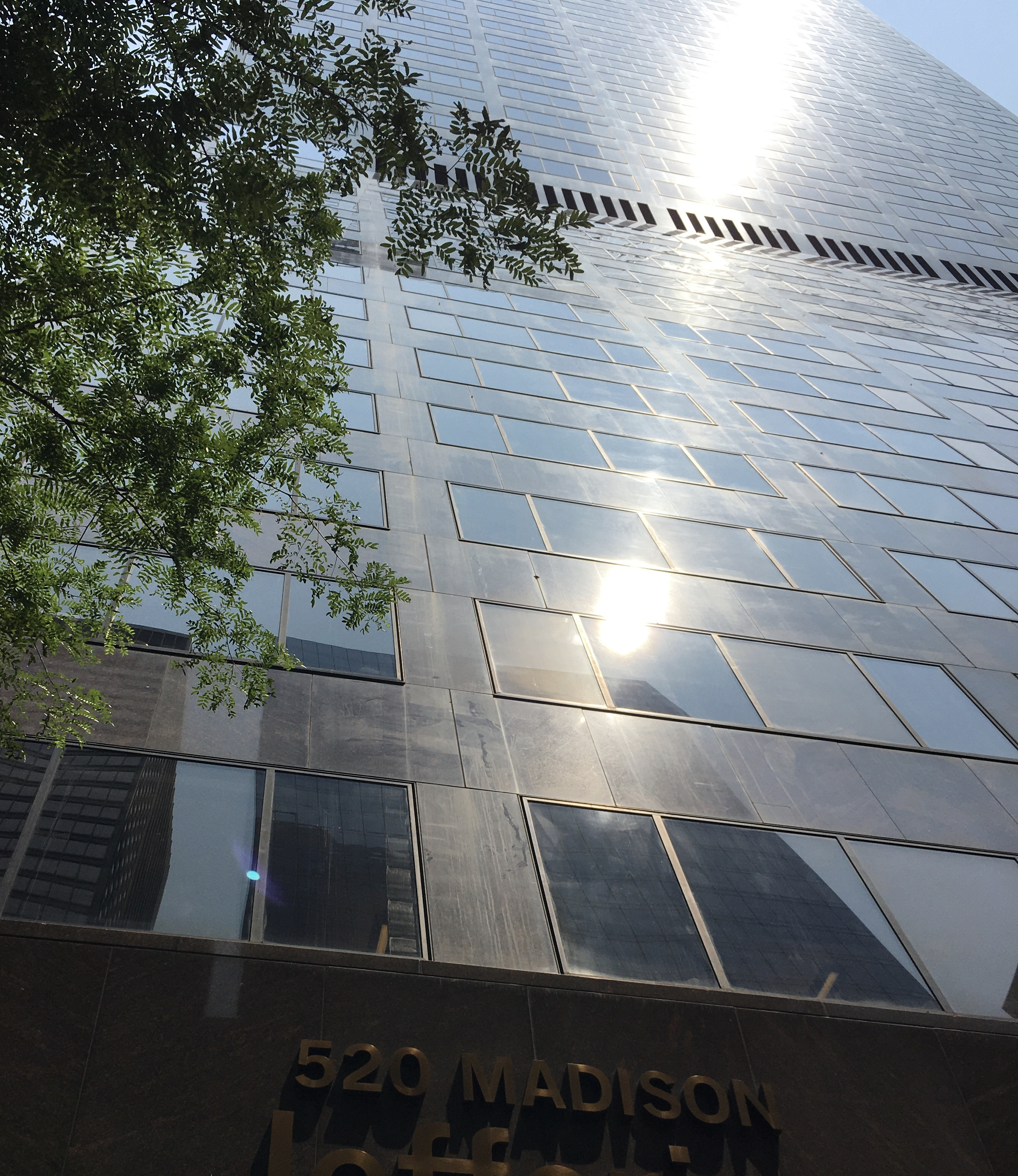
- Headquarters at 520 Madison Avenue
- Formerly: Leucadia National Corporation (1979–2018); Talcott National Corporation (1968–1979)
- Type: Public
- Traded as: NYSE: JEF; S&P 400 component
- Industry: Financial services
- Founded: 1979; 47 years ago
- Founders: Ian M. Cumming; Joseph S. Steinberg
- Headquarters: New York City
- Key people: Richard B. Handler (CEO); Brian P. Friedman (president); Joseph S. Steinberg (chairman)
- Revenue: ▲US$7.34 billion (2025)
- Operating income: ▼US$871 million (2025)
- Net income: ▼US$631 million (2025)
- Total assets: ▲US$76.0 billion (2025)
- Total equity: ▲US$10.6 billion (2025)
- Number of employees: 7,787 (2025)
- Website: jefferies.com

Jefferies Financial Group Inc. is an American financial services company based in New York City. It is listed on the New York Stock Exchange and is a part of the Fortune 1000.

== Investments ==
The company's major holdings are as follows:

=== Financial Services ===
- Jefferies Group (100%) - investment banking & capital markets
- Berkadia Commercial Mortgage (50/50 joint venture with Berkshire Hathaway) - commercial mortgage banking, investment sales and servicing
- HomeFed (65% ownership) - Builder of Master Planned Communities, Income Properties, Land Holdings
- FXCM (49.9%) - online foreign exchange trading
- Foursight Capital (100%) - vehicle finance

=== Others ===
- HRG Group (23%) - insurance and consumer products
- Vitesse Energy (96%) - oil and gas exploration and development
- Juneau Energy (98%) - oil and gas exploration and development
- Garcadia Holdings (75%, Joint venture with Ken Garff Automotive Group) - automobile dealerships
- Linkem (57%) - fixed wireless broadband services
- Golden Queen (35%) - a gold and silver mining project
- Idaho Timber (100%) - manufacturing
- National Beef Packing Company (79%) - food producer

== History ==
- In 1970, Ian Cumming and Joseph S. Steinberg both graduated from Harvard Business School and went to work for Carl Marks & Company, an investment bank.
- In 1979, they gained control of Talcott National Corporation, sold the James Talcott Factors division, and, in 1980, they renamed the company Leucadia.
- In 1984, the company made a $61 million profit on its $77 million investment in Avco Corporation by forcing the sale of the company to Textron.
- In 1991, the company acquired insurer Colonial Penn from Florida Power & Light for $150 million.
- In 1997, the company sold the life insurance division of Colonial Penn to Conseco for $460 million and sold the auto insurance division of Colonial Penn to GE Capital for $950 million.
- In 1998, the company sold Charter National Life Insurance and Intramerica Life Insurance to Allstate.
- In 2002, the company received a 44% stake in WilTel Communications Group as a result of a bankruptcy reorganization.
- In May 2003, the company made an offer to acquire the remaining shares of WilTel Communications Group that it did not already own.
- In August 2003, after increasing its offer, the company acquired the remaining shares of WilTel Communications Group.
- In September 2003, the company acquired RehabWorks.
- In January 2004, the company financed Pershing Square Capital Management, a hedge fund managed by Bill Ackman.
- In July 2004, the company sought, but failed, to buy a controlling stake in MCI Communications. In September 2004, the company sold its stake in MCI for a $20 million profit.
- In 2005, the company sold WilTel Communications Group to Level 3 Communications for a $180 million profit.
- In 2007, the company acquired ResortQuest International from Gaylord Hotels for $35 million.
- In 2009, the company entered into a 50/50 joint venture with Berkshire Hathaway called Berkadia, which acquired the North American loan origination and servicing business of Capmark Financial Group.
- In 2010, the company sold ResortQuest International to Wyndham Worldwide for $56 million in cash.
- In 2011, the company acquired a 79% interest in National Beef Packing Company for $867.9 million.
- In 2012, the company proposed building a $3 billion syngas facility in south Chicago to convert coal and petroleum waste into natural gas; however, the plant never received legislative approval.
- In 2013, the company merged with Jefferies Group and Richard Handler became chief executive officer of the company.
- During the same year, KeyBank made a sub-servicing agreement with Berkadia Commercial Mortgage on the CMBS primary servicing portfolio it is acquiring from Bank of America. It also acquired Berkadia’s $10 billion special servicing portfolio.
- In 2015, the company made an investment in FXCM after FXCM suffered losses due to the appreciation of the Swiss Franc.
- In 2016, the company restructured its investment in FXCM.
- In May 2018, the company was renamed Jefferies Financial Group.
