= William Jeffrey (footballer) =

English footballer

Personal information
- Full name: William Walls Jeffrey
- Date of birth: Jan qtr 1866
- Place of birth: Dalderby, Horncastle, England
- Date of death: 25 August 1932 (aged 66)
- Place of death: Market Rasen, Lincolnshire, England
- Height: 5 ft 9 in (1.75 m)
- Position: Defender

Youth career
- West Manchester
- Horncastle

Senior career*
| Years | Team | Apps | (Gls) |
- Lincoln City
- Grimsby Town
- Gainsborough Trinity
| 1891–1893 | Burnley | 7 | (0) |
| 1893–1894 | Woolwich Arsenal | 22 | (0) |
| 1894–1895 | Southampton St. Mary's | 13 | (0) |
- * Club domestic league appearances and goals

William Walls Jeffrey (1866 – 25 August 1932) was an English footballer who played in defence for various teams, including Burnley, Woolwich Arsenal and Southampton St. Mary's in the 1890s.

== Football career ==
Jeffrey was born in Dalderby, near Horncastle, Lincolnshire. After a spell in Lancashire with West Manchester, Jeffrey played for several clubs in Lincolnshire, before returning to the north-west to join Burnley of the Football League in August 1891.

In the 1891–92 season, Jeffrey made seven appearances for the first team playing at right-back as Burnley finished seventh in the table. At this time, Burnley had a very large squad of players, including "nearly fifty Scotsmen", so the majority of their players had to content themselves by appearing in the reserve side. One of those Scotsmen was Tom Nicol, who made the No. 2 shirt his own in 1892–93 as a result of which, Jeffrey made no further first-team appearances for the Turf Moor club.

In June 1893, Jeffrey moved to London to join Woolwich Arsenal, playing in the Second Division. In his one season at the Manor Ground, Jeffrey played in either of the full-back positions, making a total of 31 appearances in all competitions.

In November 1894, Jeffrey was recruited by Southampton St. Mary's who had just embarked on the inaugural season of the newly formed Southern League. Jeffrey made his "Saints" debut, taking over from David Hamer, at left-back in a 2–2 draw against Millwall Athletic at the Antelope Ground. He soon formed a "strong partnership" with George Marshall and retained his place for the rest of the season, when Saints finished in third place, behind Millwall Athletic and Luton Town. Jeffrey also made two appearances in the FA Cup, helping Southampton reach the First round proper for the first time, going down 4–1 to Nottingham Forest of the First Division.

At the end of the season, Jeffrey left the Saints and disappeared into obscurity.
