= Jefferies Group =

American multinational independent investment bank and financial services company

Jefferies Group LLC
- Type: Subsidiary
- Industry: Investment services
- Founded: 1962; 64 years ago
- Headquarters: New York City, New York, U.S.
- Area served: Worldwide
- Key people: Richard B. Handler (chairman, CEO, president); Brian P. Friedman (chairman of the executive committee)
- Products: Financial services Investment banking
- Revenue: ▲US$ 8.2 billion (As of November 30, 2017)
- Operating income: ▲US$ 5.1 billion (As of August 31, 2014)
- Total assets: ▲US$ 440 billion (As of August 31, 2014)
- Total equity: ▲US$ 11.5 billion (As of August 31, 2014)
- Number of employees: 7,787
- Parent: Jefferies Financial Group
- Website: www.jefferies.com

Jefferies Group LLC is an American multinational independent investment bank and financial services company that is headquartered in New York City. The firm provides clients with capital markets and financial advisory services, institutional brokerage, securities research, wealth management and asset management. This includes mergers and acquisitions, restructuring, and other financial advisory services. The Capital Markets segment also includes its securities trading (including the results of its indirectly partially owned subsidiary, Jefferies High Yield Trading, LLC) and investment banking activities.

On November 12, 2012, Jefferies announced its merger with Leucadia National Corporation, its largest shareholder. At that time, Leucadia common shares were trading at $21.14 per share. As of December 31, 2015, Leucadia shares were trading at $17.39 per share. Jefferies remains independent and is the largest operating company within the Jefferies Financial Group, as Leucadia was renamed in May 2018.

On March 1, 2013, along with the closing of the merger, Jefferies & Company, Inc. was converted to a limited liability company and re-branded as Jefferies LLC. It is a subsidiary of Jefferies Group LLC, which itself is a subsidiary of Jefferies Financial Group, formerly Leucadia.

== History ==
=== 1962–1987 ===
Jefferies was founded by Boyd Jefferies in 1962. The firm started with $30,000 in borrowed capital, which Boyd Jefferies used to purchase a seat on the Pacific Coast Stock Exchange. In the early years, the firm was a successful trader and pioneer in what would be called the "third market", which allowed for the trading of listed stocks directly between institutional investors in an over-the-counter style, providing liquidity and anonymity to buyers. In addition to its third market niche, Jefferies pioneered use of the split commissions in 1964. By 1965, Jefferies had joined the Detroit, Midwest, Boston,Philadelphia and Cincinnati Stock Exchange stock exchanges. In 1967, the company joined the New York Stock Exchange (NYSE), opening a five-person office in New York. The growing third market helped Jefferies become the seventh largest firm in size and trading on the NYSE during those years.

Jefferies was acquired in 1969 by Minneapolis-based Investors Diversified Services (IDS), the second largest U.S. financial services company at the time, and resigned all its stock exchange memberships. Jefferies saw the acquisition as a means to increase the size of its institutional business with additional capital. However, because IDS did not derive at least 50 percent of its gross income from broker-dealer operations, Jefferies had to quit the New York exchange under Exchange Rule 318. In 1971, IDS and Jefferies filed an antitrust lawsuit against the exchange, seeking $6 million in damages. Jefferies and its parent company claimed that the NYSE Big Board was an illegal monopoly and that exclusion had placed the company at a competitive disadvantage. In 1973 the presiding judge informed the NYSE that he planned to rule in Jefferies' favour. Membership was opened to brokerage firms owned by other kinds of companies, so long as 80 percent of brokerage was conducted with the public. Jefferies rejoined the exchange in March 1973.

The period during which IDS owned Jefferies was tumultuous and ultimately in September 1973 Boyd Jefferies bought back the company, then based in Los Angeles. By 1977, Jefferies had expanded with offices in Los Angeles, New York, Chicago, Dallas, Boston, and Atlanta.

Jefferies went public on October 13, 1983, with an initial offering of 1.75 million shares at $13 per share. By 1984, according to Business Week, Jefferies was among the ten most profitable publicly held brokerages. International expansion led the company to develop a new overseas office in London, headed by Frank Baxter. In 1986, Baxter became president and chief operating officer, returning to New York to manage the company.

In 1987, Boyd Jefferies was charged by the government and the Securities and Exchange Commission with two securities violations: "parking" stock for a customer Ivan Boesky and a customer margin violation. Jefferies, who had also earlier testified against Boesky, pleaded guilty; receiving a fine and a probation barring him from the securities industry for five years. The company itself was not charged but its brokerage unit was censured by the SEC. Boyd Jefferies resigned from the company in 1987.

=== 1988–1999 ===
Frank Baxter took over as CEO in 1987 and under his leadership the company focused on diversification, moving beyond its third market niche. In 1990, Jefferies derived approximately 80 percent of its revenues from equity block trades. In that year, following the collapse of Los Angeles-based Drexel Burnham Lambert, the fifth largest investment bank at the time, Jefferies hired 60 of its bankers and traders, including Jefferies' current chairman and CEO, Richard B. Handler. The hires marked the firm's entry into the high yield markets and investment banking. Three years later Jefferies launched its first sector-focused investment banking effort by hiring a group of bankers from Howard Weil, an oil and gas specialty boutique. In March 1994, Jefferies acquired a 25% stake in BBY, an Australian stockbroking and corporate advisory firm.

Baxter's expansion plans also included global expansion in electronic trading, corporate finance, international convertible sales and derivative sales. Jefferies also moved quickly into the fourth market: off-exchange, computer-based (electronic) trading. In the fourth market the broker's position was eliminated by the Portfolio System for Institutional Trading (POSIT) that traded portfolios and matched buyers and sellers automatically. The company created a wholly owned subsidiary, Investment Technology Group in 1987 to run POSIT. Investment Technology Group was eventually spun off as a separate public company in 1999.

=== 2000–2010 ===
Frank Baxter, chief executive since 1987, gave up the CEO title at the end of 2000 and stayed on as chairman; during 2000, Handler and John Shaw served as co-presidents and co-chief operating officers. In January 2001, Handler became CEO and Shaw became sole president and COO. Handler and Shaw set out to build a fully integrated investment bank and to develop a merchant bank. The new leadership proposed to give equity to every employee and diversify the firm's revenue with asset management, a more aggressive buildup of investment banking and merchant banking. In September 2001, the firm moved its headquarters from Los Angeles to New York. During this period, Jefferies built its investment banking division primarily by acquiring boutique advisory firms with specific sector expertise, most notably Randall & Dewey (energy) and Broadview (technology). Significant acquisitions during this period included:

- FS Private Investments, renamed Jefferies Capital Partners, 2001
- Lawrence Helfant, a NYSE Floor Broker Unit, August 2001
- Quarterdeck Investment Partners, an aerospace and defense advisory firm, December 2002
- Broadview International, a technology-focused advisory firm, December 2003
- Randall & Dewey, an energy-focused advisory firm, February 2005
- Helix, a private equity fund placement firm, May 2005
- LongAcre Partners, a media advisory firm, May 2007
- Putnam Lovell, a financial services advisory firm, July 2007
- Depfa First Albany Securities, municipal securities, March 2009
- Bache & Co., FX, commodities and options trading, July 2011
- Hoare Govett, corporate broking, February 2012

Beginning in 2008, Jefferies took advantage of the dislocation created during the credit crisis to enter several new business segments, including mortgage-backed securities and municipal bonds. On June 17, 2009, after several primary dealers, including Lehman Brothers, Bear Stearns, and Merrill Lynch, either collapsed or were acquired by other firms, Jefferies was named one of just 17 primary dealers participating in the New York Fed's open-market buying and selling of securities and Treasury auctions and providing market information to the New York Fed.

Beginning in 2009 the firm expanded its European businesses. Its new European Rates unit, based in London, became an official member of the Federal Republic of Germany's bidding group in October 2009, a Gilt-Edged Market Maker (GEMM) appointed jointly by the UK Debt Management Office and London Stock Exchange, and was recognized as a Dutch Primary Dealer by the Dutch State Treasury, both in December 2009. Additionally, in February 2010 Jefferies was appointed as an EBT (Especialistas em Bilhetes do Tesouro) for Treasury Bills and as an OMP (Operadores de Mercado Primário) for long-term bonds by the Portuguese Treasury and Government Debt Agency (Instituto de Gestão da Tesouraria e do Crédito Público, IGCP). Jefferies is also providing liquidity across the whole spectrum of other European government bonds.

In June 2009 the firm hired more than 35 healthcare-focused investment banking professionals from UBS. UBS's health care group, then led by Benjamin Lorello, was a major moneymaker for the firm. The group had closed more than $567 billion in transactions since 2005, generating in excess of $1 billion in revenues for UBS. Since moving to Jefferies, the healthcare group has been ranked the #1 bookrunner in number of healthcare follow-on equity transactions and the #1 ranked financial advisor in number of healthcare M&A transactions.

=== 2010 onward ===
In November 2011, Jefferies was accused by Egan-Jones of having 77% of its shareholder's equity tied up in the same illiquid sovereign debt securities that just toppled MF Global. This was accompanied by a concurrent large-scale short seller attack and a campaign of what turned out to be misinformation. Handler and the management team responded with unprecedented immediacy and transparency, collapsed 75% of the position to prove the bonds were hedged and highly liquid, sharply reduced the rest of Jefferies balance sheet and publicly addressed every false accusation. This aggressive and unconventional response resulted in an eventual 100% increase in Jefferies share price from the November lows. Leucadia, a 29% shareholder, later called this event Jefferies' "finest hour."

On April 16, 2012, Jefferies CEO Richard Handler and Chairman of the Executive Committee Brian Friedman formed the Jefferies Global Senior Advisory Board which includes James D Robinson III, Lord Hollick, Michael Goldstein, Bernard Bourigeaud, Dennis Archer, Gilles Pélisson and Sir David Reid.

On August 1, 2012, Knight Capital took a pre-tax loss of $440m due to a trading glitch. On Sunday Aug 5 the company managed to raise around $400 million from six investors led by Jefferies in an attempt to stay in business after the trading error. Jefferies CEO Richard Handler and Executive Committee Chair Brian Friedman structured and led the rescue and Jefferies purchased $125 million of the $400 million investment and became Knight's largest shareholder.

On November 12, 2012, Jefferies announced its merger with Leucadia, its largest (28%) shareholder. Leucadia is often referred to as a Baby Berkshire because of its similarities to Berkshire Hathaway. Jefferies was valued at $3.8 billion and at the time of the acquisition the newly combined company had $9.4 billion of shareholder's equity, over $5 billion of cash, and $4 billion of net operating loss ("NOL") tax credits. Jefferies remains independent and is the largest operating company within Leucadia. Richard Handler became CEO of Leucadia while retaining his position as CEO of Jefferies. Brian Friedman became President of Leucadia while retaining his duties at Jefferies. Ian Cumming retired as CEO of Leucadia and remains a Board Member and Joe Steinberg became Chairman of Leucadia.

In September 2014, Jefferies announced a $500 million deal with CircleBack Lending, which was the largest of its kind at the time. They aimed to leverage their experience with securitization markets to structure securities upheld by CircleBack Lending assets, which could then be rated and sold to an array of investors. In June 2015, the first securitization from this deal took place, totaling $106 million.

The Jefferies Group's 2019 third-quarter financial report indicated a fall in the net revenue and net income numbers, a potential consequence from the $146 million non-cash charge the company took to reflect its fair value reduction of its holdings in the We Company.

On December 9, 2019, the United States Security and Exchange Commission (SEC) ordered Jefferies to pay close to $4 million, for their inappropriate handling of American depositary receipts (ADR).

On April 5, 2021, it was announced that Jefferies Group would be coordinating the GameStop Corporation at the market sale associated with their Securities and Exchange Commission filing that it will raise up to $1 billion by selling as many as 3.5 million new shares of common stock.

In December 2025, it was announced Jefferies had acquired a 50% stake in the US credit-focused asset manager, Hildene Holding Company.

== Operations ==
Jefferies has coverage groups spanning across all industries including Aerospace & Defense, Business Services, CleanTech, Consumer & Retail, Energy, Financial Institutions Group, Financial Sponsors, Gaming & Leisure, Healthcare, Industrials, Maritime, Media, Public Finance, Real Estate & Lodging, Technology, and Telecommunications.

The firm also provides investors fundamental research and trade execution in equity, equity-linked, and fixed income securities, including corporate bonds, United States government and agency securities, repo finance, mortgage- and asset-backed securities, municipal bonds, whole loans, and emerging market debt, as well as commodities and derivatives. In addition, Jefferies provides asset management services and products to institutions and other investors.

The Group Global Headquarters is located in New York City, the European and Asian Headquarters are in London and Hong Kong, respectively. Jefferies has over 30 offices worldwide including Boston, Charlotte, Los Angeles, San Francisco and Chicago as well as in leading financial centers around the world that include Frankfurt, Zürich, Amsterdam, Singapore, Shanghai, Tokyo, and Mumbai.

== See also ==
- List of investment banks
- Boutique investment bank
