= Jeffreys =

Jeffreys is a surname that may refer to the following notable people:

- Sir Alec Jeffreys (born 1950), British biologist and discoverer of DNA fingerprinting
- Anne Jeffreys (1923–2017), American actress and singer
- Arthur Frederick Jeffreys (1848–1906), British politician
- Bertha Jeffreys (1903–1999), British physicist a.k.a. Bertha Swirles
- Charles Jeffreys (1877 – unknown), South African shooter
- Edmund Jeffreys (1846–1925), British Royal Navy admiral
- Elizabeth Jeffreys (1941–2023), British Byzantinist
- Ellen Penelope Jeffreys (1827–1904), New Zealand artist
- Garland Jeffreys (born 1943), American musician
- George Jeffreys (composer) (c.1610–1685), composer and organist to Charles I
- George Jeffreys, 1st Baron Jeffreys (1645–1689), British jurist & politician
- George Jeffreys, 1st Baron Jeffreys (British Army officer) (1878–1960), British soldier & politician
- George Jeffreys (pastor) (1889–1962), British religious leader
- Gina Jeffreys (born 1968), Australian singer
- Harold Jeffreys (1891–1989), British mathematician, statistician, geophysicist, and astronomer
- J. G. Jeffreys (1893–1977), Australian-born educator
- John Gwyn Jeffreys (1809–1885), British malacologist
- John R. F. Jeffreys (1918–1944), British mathematician
- Julius Jeffreys (1800–1877), British physician
- Justina Jeffreys (1787–1869), Jamaican-born British gentlewoman
- Paul Jeffreys (1952–1988), English rock musician and bassist
- Rhodri Jeffreys-Jones (born 1942), British historian
- Robin Jeffreys (1890–1963), British Olympic fencer
- Sheila Jeffreys (born 1948), British-born political scientist, academic, & activist
- Stephen Jeffreys (1950–2018), British playwright

== See also ==
- Baron Jeffreys, a title in the English and UK peerages
- Jeffreys prior
- Jefferies (disambiguation)
- Jeffrey (disambiguation)
- Jefferys
