= Mary Frances Jeffries =

19th century British brothel owner

Mary Frances Jeffries (1819 – 1891) was a madam and procuror in London's underworld during the late 19th century.

== Biography ==
Jeffries was born in 1819 in Brompton, Kent, England.

During the 1870s, she ran one of the few brothels in Victorian-era London which catered exclusively to many of the city's elite including the prominent businessmen and politicians including at least one member of the House of Lords and a titled Guards officer as well as aristocrats such as Leopold II. She was also involved in sexual slavery (known then as "white slavery") and child prostitution, often arranging the abduction of children by offering to watch children while parents went to collect luggage or purchase train tickets.

Among her brothels in Church Street and Kensington as well as a flagellation house in Hampstead, included a "chamber of horrors" in Gray's Inn Road where a room was designed for the purposes of sado-masochism as described by journalist William Thomas Stead in a series of articles for the Pall Mall Gazette exposing prostitution in the city during the Eliza Armstrong case. Although never proven, she may have operated a white slave house along the river near Kew, from which women were abducted and smuggled to foreign countries (see sexual slavery and human trafficking).

In 1884, Alfred Dyer's London Committee obtained evidence of a high class Chelsea brothel operated by Jeffries. An investigation by a former police inspector, who had resigned from the Metropolitan Police when senior officials refused to prosecute her, had been amassing evidence against Jeffries during the year until the London Commission began a private prosecution in March 1885. This investigation included many witnesses from the brothels, including Lola Shropshire, Leona Noman, and Agnes Moris. These witnesses unfortunately had no clear evidence and were soon dismissed.

Although unable to charge Jeffries with any serious offence apart from keeping a disorderly house, the Commission expected much publicity from the case when presenting their evidence. For example, a former housemaid testified that she witnessed an assault on a 13-year-old girl who had been whipped by a belt and raped by a customer.

Appearing in court on 5 May, accompanied by several wealthy army officers, Jeffries paid a fine of £200 after arranging with the court to plead guilty in order to have the evidence against her remain undisclosed. As she left the courthouse, a guard of honour was formed around her by her young escorts.
