= Godfrey (name) =

Godfrey is a given name and an English surname. The given name is derived from the Old French Godefroy, a name composed of the elements: the first being either God ("God") or gōd ("good"); the second being fred ("peace"). The name was brought to England by settlers from Normandy, the Low Countries, and France. The name is rendered Goraidh, Goiridh in Scottish Gaelic. In some cases the surname is derived from the Middle English personal name Godfrey, Godefrey; or the Old French Godefrei, Godefroi, Godefrois; or the Continental Germanic Godefrid. In other cases, the surname is derived from the Irish Mac Gothraidh or Ó Gothraidh.

== Given name ==
=== Medieval ===
- Godfrey of Amiens (1066–1115), bishop of Amiens
- Godfrey of Bath (died 1135), bishop of Bath
- Godfrey of Bouillon (1060–1100), Duke of Lower Lorraine, leader of the First Crusade, first ruler of the Crusader Kingdom of Jerusalem
- Godfrey of Brabant (died 1302), Belgian noble
- Godfrey of Cambrai (11th century), prior and poet
- Godfrey of Chichester (11th century), bishop of Chichester
- Godfrey of Esch (11th century), Lord of Esch and crusader
- Godfrey of Fontaines (13th century), scholastic philosopher and theologian
- Godfrey (patriarch of Aquileia) (died 1194)
- Godfrey of Saint Victor (c. 1125 – c. 1195), French monk and theologian
- Godfrey of Viterbo (c. 1120 – c. 1196), Roman Catholic chronicler
- Godred Crovan (died 1095), King of Dublin and the Isles
- Gofraid mac Amlaíb meic Ragnaill (died 1075), King of Dublin
- Godfrey van Rhenen (died 1178), bishop of Utrecht
- Godfrey of Saint-Omer (c. 1100 – 1160), knight

=== Modern ===
- Godfrey (born 1969), stage name of Godfrey Danchimah
- Godfrey Agnew (1913–1995), British civil servant
- Godfrey Argent (1937–2006), English photographer
- Godfrey Ashby (born 1930-2023), British Anglican bishop, theologian and academic
- Godfrey Baldacchino (born 1960), Maltese-Canadian social scientist
- Godfrey Cambridge (1933–1976), American comedian
- Godfrey Chitalu (1947-1993) Zambian soccer player
- Godfrey Darbishire (1853–1889), English-born Welsh rugby union forward
- Godfrey Evans (1920–1999), English cricketer
- Godfrey Farrugia (born 1960), Maltese politician
- Godfrey Fuchs (1889–1972), German-Canadian soccer player
- Godfrey Gao (1984–2019), Taiwanese-Canadian model and actor
- Godfrey Douglas Giles (1857–1941), English painter
- Godfrey Goldsborough (1548–1604), English clergyman
- Godfrey G. Goodwin (1873–1933), American politician
- Godfrey Grayson (1913–1998), English film director
- Godfrey Ho (born 1948), Hong Kong film director and screenwriter
- Godfrey Hounsfield (1919–2004), English electrical engineer
- Godfrey Huggins (1883–1971), Rhodesian politician and physician
- Godfrey Imhof (1911–1963), English racing driver
- Godfrey Isaacs (1866–1925), British-Jewish businessman
- Godfrey Gitahi Kariuki (1937–2017), Kenyan politician
- Godfrey Kiprotich (born 1964), Kenyan distance runner
- Godfrey Kneller (1646–1723), English portrait painter
- Godfrey Lagden (1851–1934), British colonial administrator
- Godfrey Edward Madawala (1878–1932), Sri Lankan Sinhala lawyer and politician
- Godfrey McCulloch (1640–1697), Scottish politician and murderer
- Godfrey McHugh (1911–1997), United States Air Force general
- Godfrey Morse (1846–1911), German-American lawyer
- Godfrey Mwakikagile (born 1949), Tanzanian scholar and author
- Godfrey O'Donnell (1939–2020), Northern Irish priest
- Godfrey Reggio (born 1939), American director of experimental documentary films
- Godfrey A. Rockefeller (1924–2010), American aviator
- Godfrey Shawa, Malawian politician
- Godfrey Sperling (1915–2013), American journalist
- Godfrey Tearle (1884–1953), British actor.
- Godfrey Vigne (1801–1863), English cricketer and traveler
- Godfrey Walusimbi (born 1989), Ugandan footballer
- Godfrey Zaunbrecher (born 1946 - 2023), American football player

=== Fictional characters ===
- Godfrey Ablewhite, a character in the novel The Moonstone
- Godfrey, a character in Xenoblade Chronicles 2
- Godfrey, also known as Godric, a character in The Southern Vampire Mysteries novels by Charlaine Harris
- Gordon Godfrey, a supporting character and supervillain from DC Comics
- Godfrey, a character in the television series Taboo
- Godfrey, First Elden Lord, a character in the video game Elden Ring
- Godfrey Smith, the protagonist of 1936 screwball My Man Godfrey

== Surname ==
- Albert Earl Godfrey (1890–1982), Canadian First World War flying ace
- Ambrose Godfrey (1660–1741), German-born British phosphorus manufacturer
- Anthony Godfrey (politician) (?–1840), Newfoundland politician
- Arthur Godfrey (1903–1983), American radio and television broadcaster
- Ben Godfrey (born 1998), English footballer
- Billie Godfrey (born 1978), English singer
- Bob Godfrey (1921–2013), English animator
- Bob Godfrey (footballer), Scottish footballer
- Brett Godfrey (born 1963), Australian businessman
- Brian Godfrey (1940–2010), Welsh footballer
- Charles Godfrey (disambiguation), multiple people
- Daniel Strong Godfrey (born 1949), American composer
- DeWitt Godfrey (born 1960), an American modernist sculptor
- Sir Edmund Berry Godfrey (1621–1678), magistrate murdered in 1678
- Edmund Godfrey-Faussett
- Edward Godfrey (disambiguation), multiple people
- Fran Godfrey (born 1953), former BBC Radio 2 newsreader
- Frank Godfrey (1889–?), English World War I flying ace
- Freya Godfrey (born 2005), English footballer who plays in the Women's Super League
- Frederick Race Godfrey (1828–1910), public figure and politician in Victoria, Australia
- George Godfrey (1853–1901), Canadian boxer and world 'colored' heavyweight champion
  - Feab S. Williams (1897–1947), American boxer and world 'colored' heavyweight champion (better known as George Godfrey; named after Godfrey)
- Hannah Godfrey (born 1997), English footballer
- Isidore Godfrey (1900–1977), conductor
- Jayne Godfrey, Australian emeritus professor of business and economics
- John Ray Godfrey (1944–2024), American basketball player
- Kathy Godfrey (died 1981), American talk show host on radio and television
- Laurie Godfrey (born 1945), American anthropologist
- Linda Godfrey, South African engineer
- Linda S. Godfrey (1951–2022), American cryptozoologist
- Marjorie Godfrey (1919–2003), Indian politician
- Martyn Godfrey (1949–2000), English-Canadian author
- Nellie Godfrey, English suffragette
- Patrick Godfrey (1933–2026), English actor
- Patrick Godfrey (engineer) (born 1946), British civil engineer and academic
- Paul Godfrey (born 1939), former president and CEO of the Toronto Blue Jays
- Paul Godfrey (RAF officer), British Royal Air Force air marshal
- Percy Godfrey (1859–1945), English composer from Kent
- Percy Downing Godfrey (1899–1930), American football coach
- Rebecca Godfrey (1967–2022), Canadian novelist and nonfiction writer
- Richard Godfrey (disambiguation), multiple people
- Robert Godfrey (disambiguation), multiple people
- Robert John Godfrey (born 1947), British composer, pianist and founder member of The Enid
- Steve Godfrey (disambiguation), multiple people
- Thomas Godfrey, multiple people
- Tony Godfrey (footballer) (born 1939), English footballer
- Wilhelmina McAlpin Godfrey (1914–1994), American tapestry artist
- William Godfrey (disambiguation), multiple people

=== Godfrey family of musicians ===
- Charles Godfrey (1790–1863), British bandmaster and composer
- Daniel Eyers Godfrey (1868–1939), British conductor, son of bandmaster Daniel Godfrey
- Daniel Godfrey (bandmaster) (1831–1903), British bandmaster and composer
- Fred Godfrey (bandmaster) (1837–1882) British bandmaster and music arranger

== See also ==
- Geoffrey (given name), a possible English/French equivalent
- Godfrey (disambiguation)
- Godfrid
- Godfried, a Dutch equivalent
- Gottfried, a German equivalent
- Queen Goodfey, supporting character of Mysticons, in which she is the kind and brave ruler of the people of planet Gemina.

== Sources ==
- Hanks, P; Coates, R; McClure, P, eds. (2016). The Oxford Dictionary of Family Names in Britain and Ireland. Vol. 2. Oxford: Oxford University Press. ISBN 978-0-19-879882-8.
- Hanks, P; Hardcastle, K; Hodges, F (2006) [First published 1990]. A Dictionary of First Names. Oxford Paperback Reference (2nd ed.). Oxford: Oxford University Press. ISBN 978-0-19-861060-1.
- Mark, C (2003). The Gaelic-English Dictionary. New York: Routledge. ISBN 0-203-27706-6.
