= Godefroy =

Godefroy is a surname of Old French origin, and originally a given name, cognate with Geoffrey/Geoffroy/Jeffrey/Jeffries, Godfrey, Gottfried, etc.

Godefroy or Godefroi may refer to:

== People ==
=== Given name ===
- Godefroi, Count of Durbuy (d. before 1124), son of Henry I
- Godefroi, Count of Montaigu (died 1161), Count of Clermont, Count of Duras
- Godefroi, Comte d'Estrades (1607–1686), French diplomat and marshal
- Godefroi, prince de La Tour d'Auvergne-Lauraguais (1823–1871), French politician
- Godefroy de Blonay (1869–1937), a member of the International Olympic Committee and one of the founders and first president of the Swiss Olympic Association
- Godefroy Calès (1799–1868), French physician and politician
- Éléonore-Louis Godefroi Cavaignac (1801–1845), French politician and journalist
- Godefroy de Forçant (died 1809), French Navy officer and adventurer
- Godefroy Durand (1832–1896), German-born French illustrator and draughtsman
- Godefroy Engelmann (1788–1839), Franco-German lithographer and chromolithographer
- Godefroy Maurice de La Tour d'Auvergne, Duke of Bouillon (1636–1721)
- Godefroy de La Tour d'Auvergne (1728–1792), Duke of Bouillon
- Godefroy Vujicic (born 1975), French classical cellist
- Godefroy Wendelin (1580–1667), astronomer from the County of Loon (now in Belgium)
- Godefroy Zumoffen (1848–1928), French Jesuit archaeologist and geologist

=== Surname ===
- Andrew Godefroy (born 1972), Canadian strategic analyst and science and technology historian
- Charles Godefroy (1888–1958), French aviator noted for flying through the Arc de Triomphe in Paris in 1919
- Denis Godefroy (1549–1622), French jurist
- Eliza Anderson Godefroy (1779–1839), believed to be the first woman to edit a general-interest magazine in the United States, wife of Maximilian Godefroy
- Frédéric Godefroy (1826–1897), French author
- Hugh C. Godefroy, World War II flying ace with the Royal Air Force and Royal Canadian Air Force - see List of World War II flying aces
- Jean-Pierre Godefroy (born 1944), French politician
- Jocelyn Godefroi (1880–1969), British translator
- Maximilian Godefroy (1765–c. 1838), French-American architect
- Thibault Godefroy (born 1985), French bobsledder
- Godefroy family, a French noble family

=== Other ===
- Raymond de Gaufredi (died 1310), sometimes anglicized as Raymond Godefroy, Minister General of the Franciscan Order from 1289 to 1295

== Places ==
- La Godefroy, a commune in the Manche department of France
- Godefroy, Les Cayes, Haiti, a village in the Les Cayes municipality
- Godefroy River, Quebec, Canada

== See also ==
- Galfrid
- Geoffrey (given name), Geoffroy (surname), Jeffrey, Jeffries, Jeffers
- Godfrey (name), Gottfried, Goffredo
- Godred/Guðrøðr
- Gofraid/Goraidh
