= Godfried =

Godfried is the Dutch form of Geoffrey and Gottfried. It may refer to:

- Carel Godfried Willem Hendrik baron van Boetzelaer van Oosterhout (1892–1986), Dutch diplomat and politician
- Eugène Godfried (1952–2009), Curaçao-born political activist and broadcaster
- Godfried Aduobe (born 1975), former Ghanaian football midfielder
- Godfried Bomans (1913–1971), popular Dutch author and television personality and a prominent Dutch catholic
- Godfried Danneels (1933–2019), Belgian cardinal of the Roman Catholic Church
- Godfried Dejonckheere (born 1952), retired Belgian race walker
- Godfried Donkor (born 1964), Ghanaian artist, living and working in London
- Godfried Schalcken (1643–1706), Dutch genre and portrait painter
- Godfried Toussaint, Research Professor of Computer Science at New York University Abu Dhabi (NYUAD)
- Godfried van Mierlo (1518–1587), bishop of Haarlem and abbot of Egmond Abbey from 1570 to 1578
- Godfried-Willem Raes, Belgian composer, performer and instrument maker
- Hendrik Godfried Duurkoop (1736–1778), Dutch merchant-trader and diplomat
- Jan Joseph Godfried van Voorst tot Voorst (1880–1963), the second highest officer in command of the Dutch armed forces during World War II
- Jan Joseph Godfried van Voorst tot Voorst (politician) (1846–1931), Dutch politician and lieutenant-general of the Dutch army
- Michiel Godfried Eman or Mike Eman (born 1961), Aruban politician who is the 5th Prime Minister of Aruba
- Pieter Godfried Maria van Meeuwen (1899–1982), Dutch lawyer and a politician

== See also ==
- Godefroid
- Godfrey (name)
- Gotfrid
- Gottfried
- Gudfred
