= Galfrid =

Galfrid or Galfred (Latinised as Galfridus or Galfredus) is an Anglo-Norman variant of the name Geoffrey. It derives, like German Gottfried (Latinised as Godafridus or Gothofredus, Anglicised as Godfrey), from Old High German Godafrid, Old French Godefroy, and Old Norse Guðfriðr, meaning 'God's peace' or 'good protection', depending upon etymological interpretation. Variants, also used as synonymous with Gottfried, include Italian Goffredo and Middle French Gaufredi (Latin Gaufridus). The name is etymologically unrelated to, but was historically used interchangeably with, Welsh Gruffudd or Gruffydd (anglicized as Griffith) in Wales.

The Anglo-Norman and British versions addressed here may refer to:

== In patrial names ==
- Galfredus Malaterra fl. 1097, a chronicler in Normandy; a.k.a. Goffredo Malaterra, Geoffroi Malaterra, Gaufredi Malaterræ, and Galfredus bendictinus e Normandia, and frequently cited by scholars of the early Middle Ages
- Geoffrey of Monmouth (c. 1095 – c. 1155), an Anglo-Norman writer; a.k.a. Galfredus Monemutensis, Galfridus Arturus, or Gruffudd ap Arthur
- Galfridus de Northcote (fl. 1103), English knight, progenitor of the Northcote baronets and earls of Iddesleigh, in Devon
- Godfrey of Saint Victor (c. 1125 – c. 1195), a French monk and theologian of the Victorine school; a.k.a. Galfredus, Geoffroy, Godefridus
- Geoffrey of Canterbury (fl. 1127–1154) Anglo-Norman Benedictine monk, an Abbot of Canterbury (England), later first Abbot of Dumfermline (Scotland); a.k.a. Galfridus
- Geoffrey of Wells (fl. 1150), an English hagiographer; a.k.a. Galfridius [de] Fontibus
- Galfridus Arbalastarius, 'Geoffrey the Crossbowman' (fl. 1189), a Norman soldier, first Lord of Preesall-with-Hackensall in Lancashire, England
- Geoffrey of Vinsauf (fl. 1200), an English grammarian, author of Poetria nova
- Galfrid de Camville (fl. 1200–1220), founder of the Priory of Cahir, a monastic house in County Tipperary, Ireland
- Galfridus (fl. 1203–1209), Abbot of Dryburgh and later of Alnwick Abbey, England; a.k.a. Geoffrey
- Galfridus de Bristollia (fl. 1213–1228), an English cleric; served as a magister to Henry de Loundres in Dublin; Ireland
- Geoffrey de Liberatione (fl. 1219 – 1249), a Scottish bishop; a.k.a. Galfredus or Galfred de Libertione
- Galfridus Martel (fl. 1242), an Anglo-Norman land-holder, namesake of Marlston (originally Marteleston), in Berkshire, England
- Galfrid de Mowbray (fl. c. 1250), a son-in-law of John I Comyn, Lord of Badenoch in Scotland
- Galfrid de Caunville (fl. ca. 1270–1290), an Anglo-Norman knight, and signatory to the Laugharne Charter in Carmarthenshire, Wales
- Galfridus de Coker (fl. 1301), a prior of Kidwelly Priory, Wales
- Galfrid de Burdon (fl. 1303–1321), a prior of Durham (and earlier of Finchale), England; a.k.a. Geoffrey de Burdon
- Galfridus de Wolvehope (fl. 1305), an English parliamentarian, briefly representing the constituency of Lewes in East Sussex, in the House of Commons
- Galfridus de Wilford (fl. 1321), a rector of St Nicholas' Church, Nottingham, England, and later of the Blackwell Church, Diocese of Lichfield (in England and partly in Wales)
- Galfredus Petrus of Bayeux (fl. 1524), a French monk, and author of Opus sane de deorum dearumque gentilium genealogia, the first work printed by Thomas Berthelet, later King's Printer for Henry VIII of England

== As a given name after the development of surnames ==
- Galfridus Walpole (1683–1726), British naval officer and politician from Houghton in Norfolk
- Galfridus Williams (fl. 1701), a curate of St Mary's Church, Sandbach, in Cheshire, England
- Galfridus Mann (fl. 1750), an army clothier of Kent, England; brother of Sir Horace Mann, 1st Baronet, and father of Sir Horatio Mann, 2nd Baronet, and of Catherine Mann, wife of James Cornwallis, 4th Earl Cornwallis
- Galfred Congreve (fl. 1850–1881), Scottish amateur footballer and cricketer, later a civil servant
- Galfrid C. K. Dunsterville (1905–1988), a Venezuelan botanist, assigned the botanical author abbreviation "Dunst."

== In fiction ==
- Galfrid, a character in The Amazons: A Farcical Romance, an 1893 British play by Arthur Wing Pinero
- Galfred, Santa Claus's bookkeeper in the 2008 American children's television movie Snow 2: Brain Freeze

== See also ==
- Phyllocoma, a genus of sea snails, with the junior synonym Galfridus
- Geoffrey, Geoffroy (surname), Jeffrey, Jeffries, Jeffers
- Godred/Guðrøðr
- Gofraid/Goraidh
- Gottfried, Godfrey, Godefroy, Goffredo
- Gruffudd/Gruffydd, Griffith (name), Griffith (surname), Griffiths
