= Joffre (disambiguation) =

Joseph Joffre was a marshal of France and Commander-in-Chief of French forces during World War I.

Joffre may also refer to:

== Places ==
- Joffre Gorge, Karijini National Park, Western Australia
- Joffre, Alberta, Canada, a hamlet
  - Joffre Cogeneration Plant, a natural gas power station in the hamlet
- Mount Joffre, Alberta and British Columbia, Canada
- Joffre Peak, British Columbia, Canada
- Joffre, Pennsylvania, United States, a census-designated place
- Joffre Peninsula, a landform in Kerguelen

== People ==
=== Given name ===
- Joffre Daigle (1925–1968), Canadian politician
- Joffre Desilets (1915–1994), Canadian National Hockey League player
- Joffre Guerrón (born 1985), Ecuadorian footballer
- Joffre Pachito (born 1981), Ecuadorian footballer
- Joffre Soares (1918–1996), Brazilian actor
- Joffre Stewart (1925–2019), American poet, anarchist and pacifist
- Joffre T. Whisenton (fl. 1980s), American academic administrator, first African-American student to earn a PhD from the University of Alabama
- Joffre Oscar Zubía (born 1946), Uruguayan retired footballer

=== Surname ===
- Jean Joffre (1872–1944), French actor
- Noris Joffre (born 1966), Puerto Rican actress

== Other uses ==
- Joffre (shipwreck), a schooner that caught fire and sank in 1947
- Joffre-class aircraft carrier, a French Navy planned class of two
  - French aircraft carrier Joffre, laid down in 1938, but never launched
- Avenue Joffre, Shanghai, China
- Joffre cake, a cake named after the marshal

== See also ==
- Joffre's bat
- Marechal Joffre (grape), a wine grape variety named after the marshal
- Lower, Middle, and Upper Joffre Lakes, in Joffre Lakes Provincial Park, British Columbia, Canada
- Joffreville, Madagascar
- Joffrey (disambiguation)
