= Charles Godfrey =

Charles Godfrey may refer to:

- Private Charles Godfrey, fictional character from British television comedy Dad's Army
- Charles Godfrey (bandmaster) (1790–1863), English bandmaster, drummer, and bassoonist
- Charles Godfrey (entertainer) (1851–1900), English music hall performer
- Charles Godfrey (courtier) (1648–1714), British courtier and politician
- Charles Godfrey (Australian cricketer) (1860–1940), Australian cricketer
- Charles Godfrey (English cricketer) (1862–1941), Sussex cricketer
- Charles Godfrey (American football) (born 1985), American football safety
- Charles Godfrey (physician) (1917–2022), Ontario politician, physician, and opponent of plans to build the Pickering Airport
- Godfrey Webb (1914–2003) British author who wrote under the name Charles Godfrey

== See also ==
- Charles Godfray (born 1958), British zoologist
- Charles Godfrey Gunther (1822–1885), Democratic mayor of New York
- Charles Godfrey Leland (1824–1903), American humorist and folklorist
