= 1928 New Year Honours =

British royal recognitions

The 1928 New Year Honours were appointments by King George V to various orders and honours to reward and highlight good works by citizens of the United Kingdom and British Empire. They were announced on 30 December 1927.

Unusually, only women were named as recipients of the Order of the British Empire in the 1928 New Year Honours.

The recipients of honours are displayed here as they were styled before their new honour, and arranged by honour, with classes (Knight, Knight Grand Cross, etc.) and then divisions (Military, Civil, etc.) as appropriate.

== United Kingdom and Colonies ==
=== Baron ===
- Lieutenant-Colonel the Right Honourable George Abraham Gibbs TD JP DL MP Member of Parliament for Bristol West since 1906; a Government Whip in the House of Commons. 1917; Treasurer of His Majesty's Household 1921 to January, 1924, and since November, 1924.
- The Right Honourable Sir Frederick John Dealtry Lugard GCMG DSO Former Governor General of Nigeria. British Member of Permanent Mandates Commission of the League of Nations since 1922.
- Sir Gerald Strickland GCMG MP Member of Parliament for Lancaster since 1924. Prime Minister of Malta.

=== Privy Councillor ===
The King appointed the following to His Majesty's Most Honourable Privy Council:

- John Colin Campbell Davidson CH CB MP Member of Parliament for Hemel Hempstead, Nov. 1920–1923, and since 1924; Chairman of the Conservative and Unionist Party since Nov. 1926; Chancellor of the Duchy of Lancaster, 1923–24; Parliamentary and Financial Secretary to the Admiralty, Nov. 1924.
- Sir Kingsley Wood MP Member of Parliament Woolwich West Division since Dec. 1918; Parliamentary Secretary to the Ministry of Health since Nov. 1924.

=== Baronetcies ===
- James Gomer Berry JP Chairman, St. Clements Press Ltd., Deputy Chairman Allied Newspapers Ltd.
- James Caird. For public and philanthropic services.
- Major-General Sir Richard Havelock Charles GCVO KCSI UD Serjeant Surgeon to H.M. The King. Late President, Medical Board, India Office.
- Colonel William Edward Carne Curre CBE JP DL For political and public services in Monmouthshire.
- Sir Arthur Worley CBE General Manager of the North British and Mercantile Insurance Company, and of the Railway Passengers Assurance Company.

=== Aide-de-Camp ===
- Captain, the Marquess of Dufferin and Ava PC DSO has been appointed a Royal Naval Volunteer Reserve Aide-de-Camp to the King, in succession to Captain Viscount Curzon CBE VD MP ADC 2 January 1928.

=== Knight Bachelor ===
- Stephen Harry Aitchison JP For political and public services in Northumberland. President of the Central Division Conservative Association, Newcastle upon Tyne.
- George Washington Badgerow CMG FRCS Dean and Surgeon to the Hospital for Diseases of the Throat and Ear, Golden Square, W. 1, Consulting Surgeon to various Dominion Hospitals in England.
- Edmund Broughton Barnard OBE JP DL Chairman of the Hertfordshire County Council and Lee Conservancy Board. For valuable services to local government.
- Alderman John Bayley. Founder and Builder of Wellington College, now Wrekin College, Salop. Has been on the Shropshire County Council since 1889.
- Reginald Bennett. For political and public services. Secretary of the Primrose League.
- Frederick Charles Bowring JP Lord Mayor of Liverpool 1925–27. For public services.
- John Reeve Brooke CB Formerly Permanent Secretary, Ministry of Transport. Secretary, Central Electricity Board.
- Arthur William Faire CBE JP DL For political and public services in Leicestershire. Chairman of the Melton Division Conservative and Unionist Association.
- Montagu Richard William Foster TD JP For political and public services in Hampshire. County Alderman, County of Southampton.
- Edward German, Composer
- His Honour Judge Peter Grain, Judge of the Supreme Court for China.
- His Honour Judge Francis John Greenwell CBE JP DL County Court Judge.
- Frederic Greville Hallett OBE JP Secretary, Joint Examining Board, Royal College of Physicians of London, and Royal College of Surgeons of England.
- Brigadier-General Harold Brewer Hartley CBE MC FRS Fellow and Tutor of Balliol College, Oxford. Member of Chemical Warfare Committee. For services to the Army in connection with training Army candidates at Oxford.
- Alderman Marshall Hays. For political and public services in Hammersmith.
- Charles Igglesden JP FSA President of the Institute of Journalists, 1927.
- George William Henry Jones MP Member of Parliament for Stoke Newington, 1918–23, and since 1924. For political and public services.
- Arthur Belmore Lowry CB Chief General Inspector, Ministry of Health.
- David McCowan DL For political and public services in Glasgow.
- Mortimer Reginald Margesson JP For political and public services in Worcestershire. Chairman of the Kidderminster Division Conservative and Unionist Association.
- David Mason OBE JP Lord Provost of Glasgow.
- William Maxwell. For political and public services in the North East of Scotland.
- Major Robert Spencer Nairn TD JP For political and public services in the East of Scotland.
- Charles Grant Robertson CVO Vice Chancellor and Principal of Birmingham University.
- Alderman James Robinson CBE JP For public and political services in Cardiff.
- Percy William George Sargent CMG DSO FRCS Honorary Consultant Surgeon, Ministry of Pensions. Specialist in cases of injury to brain and spinal cord.
- Meyer Adam Spielman, Chairman of Managers of Hayes Industrial School and of Park House Reformatory School.
- Thomas Ernest Stanton CBE FRS Superintendent, Engineering Department, National Physical Laboratory.
- Alexander Stevenson JP Lord Provost of Edinburgh.
- Walter Wooll West JP For political and public services in the Isle of Ely.

Dominions

- John Longstaff, President of Society of Australian Artists.
- The Honourable Alfred Bishop Morine KC Minister without Portfolio, Newfoundland.
- Charles Samuel Nathan CBE Vice-Chairman of the Development and Migration Commission, Commonwealth of Australia.
- The Honourable Thomas Walter Stringer, lately Judge of the Supreme Court of New Zealand.

British India

- Saw Hke CIE Sawbwa of Hsipaw, Burma.
- Justice Louis Charles Crump, Indian Civil Service, Puisne Judge of the High Court of Judicature, Bombay.
- Justice Arthur Herbert Cuming, Indian Civil Service, Puisne Judge of the High Court of Judicature, Calcutta.
- Albert Ashley Biggs, Agent, Madras and Southern Mahratta Railway.
- Brojendra Lai Mitter, Advocate-General, Bengal.
- Edwin Hall Pascoe, Director, Geological Survey of India.
- Byramjee Jeejeebhoy, Sheriff of Bombay.
- Jehangir Cooverjee Coyajee, Professor of Political Economy and Philosophy in the Presidency College at Calcutta, lately Member of the Royal Commission on the Indian Tariff and Indian Currency.
- Shapurji Bomanji Billimoria MBE JP lately Member of the Bombay Back Bay Committee.
- Doctor William James Wanless, American Presbyterian Mission Hospital, Miraj, Bombay.

Colonies, Protectorates, etc.

- Algernon Edward Aspinall CMG CBE Secretary to the West India Committee.
- Frank Morrish Baddeley CMG Chief Secretary to Government, Nigeria.
- Clement Everitt, Unofficial Member of the Executive and Legislative Councils, Straits Settlements.
- Richard Allmond Jeffrey Goode CMG CBE lately Chief Secretary to Government, Northern Rhodesia.
- William Alison Russell, Chief Justice, Tanganyika Territory.
- Henry Milne Scott KC Acting Attorney-General, Fiji. Member of the Executive and Legislative Councils, formerly Mayor of Suva.

=== The Most Honourable Order of the Bath ===
==== Knight Grand Cross of the Order of the Bath (GCB) ====
Military Division

Army

- General Sir Archibald James Murray GCMG KCB CVO DSO Retired pay.
- General Sir Alexander John Godley KCB KCMG ADC General to The King, Colonel The Royal Ulster Rifles, General Officer Commanding-in-Chief, Southern Command.
- General Sir Havelock Hudson KCB KCIE Retired pay, late. Indian Army, Colonel The Northamptonshire Regiment.
- General Sir Alexander Stanhope Cobbe VC KCB KCSI DSO Indian Army, Colonel The South Wales Borderers, General Officer Commanding-in-Chief, Northern Command, India.

Civil Division

- The Right Honourable Sir John Eldon Bankes, Lord Justice of Appeal.

==== Knight Commander of the Order of the Bath (KCB) ====
Military Division
Royal Navy

- Vice-Admiral Hugh Dudley Richards Watson CB CVO CBE

Army

- Major-General John Duncan CB CMG CVO DSO General Officer Commanding North China Command.
- Lieutenant-General Sir Louis Ridley Vaughan KBE CB DSO Unemployed List, Indian Army.

==== Companion of the Order of the Bath (CB) ====
Military Division
Royal Navy

- Rear-Admiral Roger Roland Charles Backhouse CB CMG
- Engineer Rear-Admiral Frederick William Sydenham OBE
- Captain the Honourable Reginald Aylmer Ranfurly Plunkett-Ernle-Erle-Drax DSO ADC RN

Army

- Major-General James Stuart Gallie CMG DSO KHS late Royal Army Medical Corps, Deputy Director of Medical Services, Aldershot Command.
- Colonel (temporary Colonel Commandant) Frederick William Henry Walshe CMG DSO ADC Colonel Commandant, Royal Artillery, Eastern and Western Commands, India.
- Colonel Ladislaus Herbert Richard Pope-Hennessy DSO Military Attache, Washington.
- Colonel Claude Bussell-Brown DSO Chief Engineer, South China Command.
- Colonel John Greer Dill CMG DSO Instructor Imperial Defence College.
- Colonel Walter Mansel Parker CMG DSO Deputy Director of Transport, Army Headquarters, India.
- Colonel (temporary Colonel Commandant) Patrick Barclay Sangster CMG DSO Indian Army, Brigade Commander, 9th (Jhansi) Infantry Brigade, India.
- Colonel (temporary Colonel Commandant) Edward Currie Alexander CIE DSO Indian Army, Brigade Commander, 4th (Quetta) Infantry Brigade, India.
- Colonel (temporary Colonel Commandant) Richard Gardiner DSO Indian Army, Brigade Commander, 3rd (Jhelum) Infantry Brigade, India.
- Colonel Charles Henry Kemble Chauncy CBE Indian Army, Deputy Director of Movements and Quartering, Army Headquarters, India.

Royal Air Force

- Air Commodore Hugh Caswall Tremenheere Dowding CMG RAF

Civil Division

- Captain Llewellyn Evan Hugh Llewellyn OBE RN (Retired).
- Commander Thomas Joseph Croker RN (Retired).
- James Alan Noel Barlow CBE Principal Assistant Secretary, Industrial Relations Department, Ministry of Labour.
- Arthur Stretton Gaye OBE Commissioner of Crown Lands.
- William Thomas Leech, Director of Telegraphs and Telephones, General Post Office.
- Henry Aufrere Leggett CBE Director of Establishments, Ministry of Health.
- Lewis McQuibban CBE Permanent Secretary, Ministry. of Education, Northern Ireland.

=== The Most Exalted Order of the Star of India ===
==== Knight Commander (KCSI) ====
- Sir Bhupendra Nath Mitra KCIE CBE Member of the Governor-General's Executive Council.
- Sir Samuel Perry O'Donnell KCIE CSI Indian Civil Service, Member of the Executive Council of the Governor of the United Provinces.
- Sir Chunilal Vijbhukhandas Mehta, Member of the Executive Council of the Governor of Bombay.

==== Companion (CSI) ====
- Charles Cunningham Watson CIE Indian Civil Service, Political Secretary to the Government of India.
- Lieutenant-Colonel Terence Humphrey Keyes CMG CIE Political Department.
- Robert John Sherwood Dodd. Inspector-General of Police, United Provinces.
- Major Henry George Vaux CIE MVO Military Secretary to His Excellency the Governor of Bombay.

=== The Most Distinguished Order of Saint Michael and Saint George ===
==== Knight Grand Cross of the Order of St Michael and St George (GCMG) ====
- Sir Graeme Thomson KCB Governor and Commander-in-Chief of Nigeria.

==== Knight Commander of the Order of St Michael and St George (KCMG) ====
- Lieutenant-Colonel Sir Edward William Macleay Grigg KCVO CMG DSO MC Governor and Commander-in-Chief of Kenya Colony.
- Edward John Harding CB CMG Assistant Under-Secretary of State, Dominions Office.
- Major Charles William James Orr CMG Governor and Commander-in-Chief of the Bahama Islands.
- The Honourable Philip Whistler Street, Chief Justice of the Supreme Court, State of New South Wales.

==== Companion of the Order of St Michael and St George (CMG) ====
- Major Robert George Archibald DSO Director of the Wellcome Tropical Research Laboratories, Khartoum.
- Henry Sinclair Campbell Budge, Official Secretary to the Governor and Clerk to the Executive Council, State of New South Wales.
- George Craig, Comptroller of Customs, Dominion of New Zealand.
- Albert Fuller Ellis, New Zealand Member of the British Phosphate Commission.
- Odin Tom Faulkner, Director of Agriculture, Nigeria.
- Alexander Flint CB Principal Assistant Secretary, Admiralty.
- William Alfred Cecil Goodchild, Assistant Delegate and General Secretary of the British Delegation to the Reparation Commission.
- Alexander William Keown-Boyd CBE Director-General of the European Department of the Ministry of the Interior, Cairo.
- Percy Alexander Koppel CBE Counsellor in the Foreign Office. William Peters, late of His Majesty's Mission at Moscow.
- Robert Frier Jardine OBE Administrative Inspector, Ministry of the Interior, Iraq.
- Lewis Francis Mizzi Senior Member of the Bar, Malta, formerly Member of the Legislative Assembly; in recognition of his public services.
- Herbert Phillips OBE Inspector General of Consular Establishments in the Far East.
- Francis Graeme Tyrrell, Controller of Revenue, Ceylon.
- Major Francis Walter Fitton Jackson DSO Provincial Commissioner, Eastern Province, Gold Coast.
- Cyril Legh Winser MVO Private Secretary to the Governor, State of South Australia.
- Edward Dudley Corscaden Wolfe, Captain Superintendent of Police, Hong Kong.
- Ernest Charteris Holford Wolff, British resident, Negri Sembilan, Federated Malay States

=== Order of the Indian Empire ===
==== Knight Commander (KCIE) ====
- His Highness Maharaja Vishvanath Singh Bahadur, Maharaja of Chhatarpur.
- Norman Edward Marjoribanks CSI Indian Civil Service, Member of the Executive Council of the Governor of Madras.
- Sir Edward Grimwood Mears, Chief Justice of the High Court of Judicature, Allahabad.

==== Companion (CIE) ====
- Andrew Gourlay Clow, Indian Civil Service, Officiating Secretary to the Government of India in the Department of Industries and Labour.
- William David Russell Prentice, Indian Civil Service, Chief Secretary to the Government of Bengal.
- Alan Hubert Lloyd, Indian Civil Service, Member of the Central Board of Revenue.
- Arthur Terence Stowell, Acting Agent, North-Western Railway.
- Hyde Clarendon Gowan, Indian Civil Service, Chief Secretary to Government, Central Provinces.
- Colonel (Temporary Colonel-on-the-Staff) Cecil Charles Palmer CBE Deputy Master-General of Supply and Director of Artillery, Army Headquarters.
- James Hezlett, Indian Civil Service, Officiating Commissioner, Surma Valley and Hill Divisions, Assam.
- George Townsend Boag, Indian Civil Service, Secretary to Government, Finance Department, Madras.
- Charles William Aldis Turner, Indian Civil Service, Secretary to the Government of Bombay in the General, Educational and Marine Departments.
- Lieutenant-Colonel Cuthbert Lindsay Dunn, Indian Medical Service, Director of Public Health, United Provinces.
- Arthur Ralph Astbury, Chief Engineer, Public Works Department, Punjab.
- John Nesbitt Gordon Johnson, Indian Civil Service, Deputy Commissioner of Delhi.
- Major Claude Ernest Torin Erskine DSO MC Indian Army.
- Major Richard Outram Chamier, Private Secretary to His Excellency the Governor of the United Provinces.
- Edward Henry Berthoud OBE Indian Civil Service, Commissioner of Excise and Salt, and Inspector-General of Registration, Bihar and Orissa.
- Ralph Albert Horton, Superintendent of Police, United Provinces.
- Walchand Hirachand Doshi, Bombay.
- Dinshah Fardunji Mulla, Advocate, Bombay High Court.
- George Morgan, Member of the Legislative Council, Bengal.
- Rai Bahadur Mahendra Chandra Mitra, Vakil, Bengal.
- Bao Bahadur Raja Hari Singh, of Mahajan, of Bikaner, Rajputana.
- Kheng Beng Chong.
- Frederick William Thomas, lately Librarian, India Office, London.

=== The Royal Victorian Order ===
==== Knight Grand Cross of the Royal Victorian Order (GCVO) ====
- Charles Henry Alexander, Marquess of Anglesey
- Sir Norman Fenwick Warren Fisher GCB

==== Knight Commander of the Royal Victorian Order (KCVO) ====
- Sir Edward Elgar OM
- Sir Frank Baines CVO CBE
- Colonel Clive Wigram CB CSI CVO
- Lieutenant-Colonel Arthur d'Arcy Gordon Bannerman CIE CVO
- Lionel Cust CVO (dated 17 December 1927).

==== Commander of the Royal Victorian Order (CVO) ====
- Sir Frederick Macmillan.
- Alexander Gordon Ingram CMG OBE (dated 6 July 1927).

==== Member of the Royal Victorian Order, 4th class (MVO) ====
- Frank Herbert Mitchell CBE
- Ex-Bailie William Brownhill Smith OBE (Glasgow).
- Treasurer James Stewart OBE (Glasgow).
- Bailie Peter Harvey Allan (Edinburgh).
- Lieutenant-Commander George Griffiths RN (dated 7 August 1927).
- The Revd. John Stirton (dated 4 October 1927).

==== Member of the Royal Victorian Order, 5th class (MVO) ====
- George David Field.
- Jocelyn Godefroi.
- Basil Hinton Philpott.
- John Gwyndeg Hughes-Roberts.

=== The Most Excellent Order of the British Empire ===
Only women were named as recipients of the Order of the British Empire in this list.

==== Dame Commander of the Order of the British Empire (DBE) ====
- Mary Du Caurroy, Duchess of Bedford RRC FLS For public services.
- Jane Frances Dove JP former Headmistress of St Leonards School, St. Andrews.

==== Commander of the Order of the British Empire (CBE) ====
- Annie Rosalie Collin, Secretary of the Friends of the Poor Society.
- Ellen Mary Musson RRC Chairman of the General Nursing Council.
- Violet Mary Craig Roberton JP Bailie of City of Glasgow.

==== Officer of the Order of the British Empire (OBE) ====
- Eleanor Martha Barker, Honorary Secretary and Treasurer of the St. Barnabas Hostels and Pilgrimage Fund.
- Edith Broadbent, Member of East and Mid-Sussex War Pensions Committee. For valuable public services as voluntary worker in administration of War Pensions.
- Isabel Brogden Carter, Member of the Cheshire Mental Deficiency Committee.
- Jeannette Halford, Founder and Honorary Secretary of the National League for Health, Maternity and Child Welfare.
- Essie Margaret Harris JP For public and political services in Swansea.
- Rosalie Alice Jane Henderson, Vice Chairman, East Cumberland War Pensions Committee. For valuable public services as voluntary worker in administration of War Pensions.
- Mary Mitchell Thorburn RRC Matron of the London County Mental Hospital, Horton.

==== Member of the Order of the British Empire (MBE) ====
- Agnes Jane Chalmers, Member of Bromley, Sevenoaks and District War Pensions Committee. For valuable public services as voluntary worker in administration of War Pensions.
- Ada Davies, Lady Superintendent Plaistow Maternity Hospital.
- Frances Isabella Hepburn, Secretary and Treasurer of the Edinburgh Branch of the Society for the Prevention of Cruelty to Children.
- Margaret Elizabeth Shelton-Jones, Member of Warrington, Widnes and District War Pensions Committee. For valuable public services as voluntary worker in administration of War Pensions.
- Jane Mottershead, Senior Assistant Matron, Cheshire County Mental Hospital, Macclesfield.
- Florence Elizabeth Pearse, Inspector of Midwives and Superintendent of Health Visitors, Oxford.
- Hannah Ada Turner, Member of Bristol and District War Pensions Committee. For valuable public services as voluntary worker in administration of War Pensions.

Colonies, Protectorates, etc.

- Margaret Sloan, lately Principal Matron. Government Medical Department, Hong Kong.

=== Kaisar-i-Hind Medal ===
First Class

- Margaret Evelyn, Viscountess Goschen, Madras.
- Iravati Mehta, Benares.
- Captain James Edward Corbett, Nainital.
- Edris Griffin, Superintendent, Lady Reading Health School, Delhi.
- Anne Strahan Graham, Superintendent, Lady Reading Health School, Delhi.
- The Reverend John Newcomb, American Baptist Missionary, Madras.
- Brother Gregory, Head Master, Marist Brothers School, Aden.
- Ellen Margaret Farrer, Medical Missionary, Zenana Baptist Mission, Punjab.

=== Air Force Cross ===
- Flight Lieutenant Charles Roderick Carr DFC
- Flight Lieutenant Robert Linton Ragg.

=== Air Force Medal ===
- Flight Sergeant (Pilot) Francis Hubert Pelham Simpson MM
- Sergeant (Pilot) David Kinnear.

=== King's Police Medal (KPM) ===
For a Bar to the King's Police Medal
British India

- Munshi Yusuf Hussain, Sub-Inspector, United Provinces Police.
- Geoffrey Bernard Sandeman Prance, Superintendent, Punjab Police.
- Ch. Mahmud Khan, Sub-Inspector, Punjab Police.

His Majesty has also graciously consented to a bar to the King's Police Medal being handed to the next-of-kin of the undermentioned officer, who died on the 26th December, 1926, and who would have received the decoration had he survived:

- Harry Rivett Cecil Guise MC Superintendent, Bihar and Orissa Police.

England and Wales

- Lieutenant-Colonel Frank Augustus Douglas Stevens CBE Chief Constable of Bedfordshire.
- John William A. Danby, Chief Constable of Hyde Borough Police.
- William Jones MBE Chief Superintendent and Deputy Chief Constable, Glamorgan County Police.
- Philip Fermer Ambrose MBE Chief Superintendent, Kent County Police.
- William Banister, Superintendent, Lancashire County Police.
- Thomas Jackson, Superintendent, Warwick County Police.
- Thomas William Hill, Superintendent and Deputy Chief Constable, Worcester County Police.
- Alfred Clay den, Sergeant, Metropolitan Police.
- Henry Pegler, Sergeant, Metropolitan Police.
- Duncan Dunn, Constable, Metropolitan Police.
- George Hainsby, Constable, Metropolitan Police.
- William Marshall, Constable, Metropolitan Police.
- Percival Roberts, Constable, Metropolitan Police.
- Frederick Stone, Constable, Metropolitan Police.
- Albert Turpin, Constable, Metropolitan Police.
- Charles Young Brown, Constable, Devon County Police.
- George Brothwood, Constable, Lancashire County Police.
- Thomas Johnson, Constable, Lancashire County Police.
- James Edward Dainty, Constable, Nottingham County Police.
- George Edwin Beaton, Constable, Somerset County Police.
- Edwin John Pollington, Con-stable, Dover Borough Police.
- John Harold Clarke, Constable, Liverpool City Police.
- William Henry Smith, Constable, Liverpool City Police.
- Frank Leech, Constable, Salford Borough Police.

Fire Brigade

- Captain Henry John Butler MBE Superintendent and Chief Officer, Wimbledon Fire Brigade.

Scotland

- Neil McLennan OBE Chief Constable, Dumbarton County Police.
- Charles Cheyne MBE Chief Constable, Hamilton Burgh Police.
- William Robb, Chief Constable, Renfrew Burgh Police.
- David Happell MBE Superintendent and Deputy Chief Constable, Ayr County Police.
- John Syme, Superintendent and Deputy.
- Chief Constable, Lanark County Police.
- Graham C. Henderson, Constable, Glasgow City Police.
- Arthur Williamson, Constable, Glasgow City Police.

Northern Ireland

- Henry George Slack, Head Constable, Royal Ulster Constabulary.

Australia

- Stephen Condon, lately Inspector of Police and Officer in Charge of the Criminal Investigation Branch of the Western Australian Police Department.
- Robert Morrison Larsen, Constable, Western Australian Police Force.

Union of South Africa

- John Christian Hoehler, First Class Constable, South African Police.

British India

- Lionel Bell Gasson, Deputy-Commissioner, Madras Police.
- William Lane Kynaston Herapath, Superintendent, Bombay Police.
- Chintaman Mahadeo Mate, Inspector, Bombay Police.
- Shaikh Kifayat Shaikh Ajam, Sub-Inspector, Bombay Police.
- Tuni Meerza, Superintendent, Bengal Police.
- Richard Ernest Coupland, Deputy Inspector-General, United Provinces Police.
- Tejasvi Prasad Bhalla, Assistant Superintendent, United Provinces Police.
- Thakur Moti Singh, Sub-Inspector, United Provinces Police.
- Munshi Nadir Ali Khan, Sub-Inspector, United Provinces Police.
- Teja Singh, Officiating Deputy Superintendent, Punjab Police.
- Gerald Charles Routh Herdon, Superintendent, Punjab Police.
- Harold George Bussell, Assistant Superintendent., Punjab Police.
- Major Cyril de Montfort Wellborne OBE Officiating Inspector-General, Burma Police.
- Mohamed Saddiq Khan, Constable, Burma Police.
- Captain John Francis Bowerman Assistant Commandant, Burma Military Police.
- Mirza Yusuf Beg, Retired Constable, Bihar and Orissa Police.
- Jagat Narain Singh, Constable, Bihar arid Orissa Police.
- Bhagwan Pershad, Inspector, Central Provinces Police.
- Ghulam Muhammad, Head Constable, North-West Frontier Province Police.
- Khan Bahadur Tasadduq Husain MBE Superintendent of Police, Intelligence Bureau, Home Department, Government of India.

Colonies, Protectorates and Mandated Territories

- Muni wa Mutumbi, First Class Constable, Kenya Police.
- Major George Herbert Kirkham MC Deputy Commissioner of Police and Prisons, Tanganyika Territory.
- Lieutenant-Colonel William Henry Wyndham Murphy DSO Commandant of the Zanzibar Police Force.
- Arthur Harold Dickinson, Assistant Superintendent of Police, Straits Settlements.
- Kenneth Walter Andrew, Sub-Inspector, Hong Kong Police Force.
- Marcos Antoniou, Inspector, Cyprus Police.
- Ahmed Izzet Hassan, Inspector, Cyprus Police.
- Kyriaco Gavriel Zaptieh, Cyprus Police.
- William Samuel Hay, Sergeant-Major, Jamaica Constabulary.
- Captain Patrick Ruane, lately Inspector, Leeward Islands Police Admiralty, R.N.V.R.
