= Godfrid =

Godfrid may refer to:

- Gudfred (died 810), king of the Danes
- Godfrid Haraldsson (820–56), son of King Harald Klak in Jutland
- Godfrid, Duke of Frisia (died 885), Viking duke in Frisia
- Godfrid Storms (1911–2003), Dutch professor of Old and Middle English Literature

== See also ==
- Godfrey (name)
- Gottfried
- Gofraid
