= Geoffrey (name) =

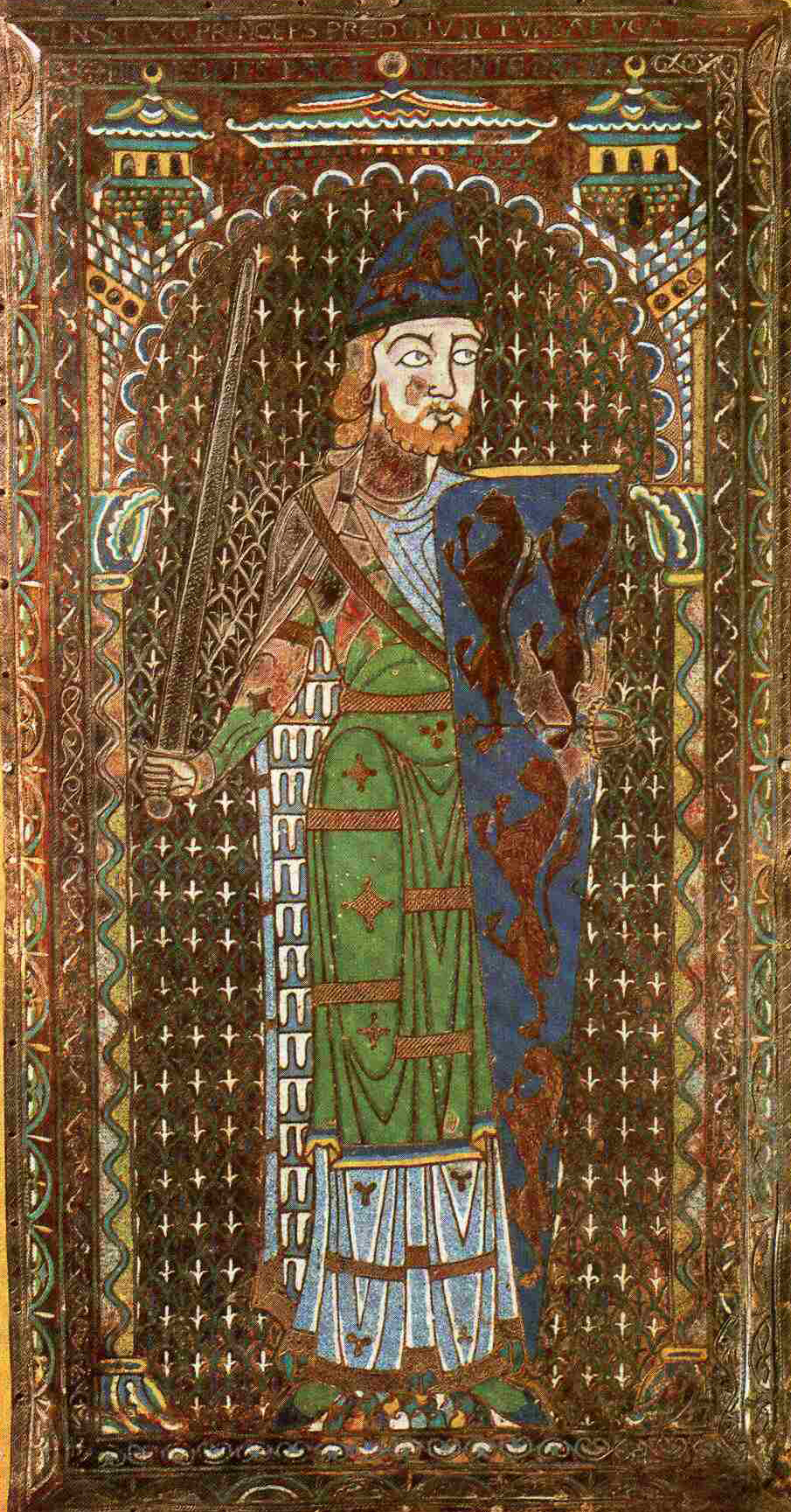
- Geoffrey Plantagenet, Count of Anjou
- Pronunciation: /ˈdʒɛfri/ JEF-ree
- Gender: Male

Origin
- Meaning: "God's peace"
- Region of origin: Francia, Medieval Germany, Norman England

Other names
- Nickname: Geoff
- Derived: Godfried, Gottfried, Godfrey
- Related names: Jeffrey, Joffrey, Geoff, Jeff

Geoffrey is an English masculine given name. It is generally considered the Anglo-Norman form of the Germanic compound *gudą 'god' and *friþuz 'peace'. It is a derivative of Dutch Godfried, German Gottfried and Old English Gotfrith and Godfrith.

Alexander Macbain considered it as being found in the Gaelic and Welsh forms; potentially before or contemporary to the Anglo-Saxon, with the examples of Goraidh, Middle Gaelic Gofraig (1467 MS.), Godfrey (do.), Irish Gofraidh (F.M.), Middle Irish Gothfrith, Gofraig (Tigernach, 989), Early Irish Gothfraid (Lib. Lein.), E. Welsh Gothrit (Ann. Camb.). Macbain suggested these Celtic forms of the name were closer related to the Anglo-Saxon Godefrid than the Norse Goðröðr, Gudrød or Góröðr; however he does not elaborate further on the origin or relation.

It was also Anglicised as Jeffrey later. Popularity of the name declined after the medieval period, but it was revived in modern England and the British Empire at large. Modern hypocorisms include Geoff and Jeff.

Jeffrey and its variants are found as surnames, usually ending in -s (e.g. Jefferies, Jaffrays); the surname Jefferson is a patronymic version of the given name.

== Etymology ==
The Old French form of the name was Geoffrei [dʒɔfrej], which developed into West Middle French Geoffrey and East Middle French Geoffroy.

Latinised forms include Jotfredus, Jozsfredus, Josfredus (10th century) and Jof[f]redus, Jofridus, Jaufredus, Geffredus (11th century).

The original spelling with Jo- was modified in Geo-. The graphic e after G is used in French to avoid the pronunciation [ɡo], but [ʒɔ] instead. The spelling Geo- is probably due to the influence of the first name Georges, derived from Old French Jorre, Joire.

The Old Frankish name Godefrid itself is from the Germanic elements god- and frid-. The Middle Latin form is Godefridus (whence also Godfrey). The second element is widely used in Germanic names, and has a meaning of "peace, protection". The first element god- is conflated from two, or possibly three, distinct roots, i.e. got and possibly *gaut, in origin a tribal name (Geats, Goths) or a theonym (a byname of Wotan).

Albert Dauzat (1951, rev. ed. 1980) followed by others, argued that the Middle French name Geoffrey retains a distinction between two Germanic names which became conflated in the Middle Ages. According to this argument, Godfrey continues *goda-friþu-, while Geoffroy continues *gaut-friþu-. If a strictly phonetic development is assumed, Geoffrey cannot be derived from Godfrid, as *go- would result in Old French go- [ɡɔ] and not geo- (jo-, [dʒɔ]), i.e. goda-fridu would yield Godefroy [ɡodfrwa] but not Geoffroy. On the other hand, *gau- [ɡaw] would regularly result in jo- (geo- [dʒɔ]), i.e. *gaut-fridu- would regularly result in Geoffroy [dʒɔf:rwa].

Alternative suggestions which would derive the first element from Germanic gisal- 'hostage', or w(e)alah 'Gallo-Roman; stranger' are also rejected by Dauzat as phonetically impossible: gi would have resulted in Old French [dʒi] (Modern French [ʒi]), as in Gisalbert > Gilbert (i.e. *Gisalfrid > *Giffrey), and *w(e)alh- would have resulted in *gaul- [ɡol] (i.e. *Wealhfrid > *Gaulfrey, *Gauffrey).

== People named Geoffrey or Geoffroy ==
=== Middle Ages ===
==== Rulers ====
- Geoffrey I, Count of Anjou (died 987)
- Geoffrey II, Count of Anjou (died 1060)
- Geoffrey III, Count of Anjou (died 1096)
- Geoffrey IV, Count of Anjou (died 1106)
- Geoffrey Plantagenet, Count of Anjou (1113–1151), Duke of Normandy, founder of the House of Plantagenet
- Geoffrey II, Duke of Brittany (1158–1186), son of King Henry II of England and brother of Kings Richard and John

==== Writers and chroniclers ====
- Geoffrey of Monmouth (c. 1095–c. 1155), Welsh cleric and chronicler, one of the major figures in the development of British history
- Geoffroy du Breuil (fl. 1181, 12th century French chronicler
- Geoffrey the Baker (died c. 1360), English historian and chronicler
- Geoffroy IV de la Tour Landry (c. 1320–1391), French nobleman and writer
- Geoffrey Chaucer (c. 1340s–1400), English author, poet, philosopher, bureaucrat and diplomat

==== Others ====
- Geoffrey (archbishop of York) (c. 1152–1212), illegitimate son of King Henry II of England, Bishop of Lincoln and Archbishop of York
- Geoffrey (Dean of Lincoln) ) (died 1182 or 1183), English Roman Catholic priest
- Geoffroy de Charney (died 1314), French Preceptor of the Knights Templar

=== Modern world ===
==== In film and television ====
- Geoff Dolan, New Zealand actor, singer and corporate entertainer
- Geoff Edwards, American actor and game-show host
- Geoff Eigenmann, Filipino actor, host and model
- Geoff Harvey, Australian musician and television personality
- Geoffrey Hayes, English television presenter and actor
- Geoffrey Holder, Trinidadian-American actor
- Geoffrey Horne, American actor
- Geoffrey Lewis (actor), American actor
- Geoff Morrell (actor), Australian actor
- Geoff Murphy, New Zealand film director, writer and assistant director
- Geoffrey Palmer (actor), English actor
- Geoffrey Perkins, British radio and television producer
- Geoff Ramsey, American voice actor and film producer
- Geoffrey Rush, Australian actor
- Geoff Thompson (writer), British writer, film director and self-defence expert
- Geoffrey Wright, Australian film director

==== In music ====
- Geoff Barrow, producer/instrumentalist for the band Portishead
- Geoffrey Jeff Beck, English rock guitarist who played with The Yardbirds
- Geoff Berner, Canadian singer-songwriter on the accordion
- Geoffrey Burgon, English composer
- Geoff Castellucci, bass vocalist for the a cappella group VoicePlay
- Geoff Downes, keyboard player with The Buggles, Yes and Asia
- Geoff Emerick, recording studio audio engineer best known for his work with the Beatles
- Geoffrey Gordon (composer), American composer
- Geoff Harvey, Australian musician and television personality
- Geoffrey Kelly, multi-instrumentalist and vocalist for Canadian Celtic folk rock band Spirit of the West
- Geoff Nicholls, former keyboard player for Black Sabbath
- Geoffrey Richardson (musician), multi-instrumentalist for Caravan
- Geoff Rickly, lead singer and lyricist of the Post-Hardcore band Thursday
- Geoff Stone, percussionist for Drastic Fall
- Geoff Tate, American rock singer, former member of the band Queensryche
- Geoff Wigington, guitarist for the pop punk band Waterparks

==== In sports ====
- Geoff Ablett (1955–2026), Australian rules footballer
- Geoff Abrams, American tennis player
- Geoffrey Beck (cricketer) (1918–2019), English cricketer and minister
- Geoff Bent, one of the eight Manchester United footballers that lost their lives in the Munich air disaster
- Geoff Blum, Major League Baseball player
- Geoff Bodine, NASCAR driver
- Geoff Boss, ChampCar and IMSA driver
- Geoffrey Boycott, England Test cricketer
- Geoffrey Cantin-Arku (born 1998), Canadian football player
- Geoff Capes, British former shot put champion and two-time World's Strongest Man winner
- Geoffrey Cheah, Hong Kong competitive swimmer
- Geoff Collins (American football), American college football player and coach
- Geoffrey Gray (born 1997), American-Israeli basketball player in the Israeli Basketball Premier League
- Geoff Grover, Australian rules footballer
- Geoff Horsfield, English football coach and former player
- Geoff Howarth, New Zealand cricketer
- Geoff Hudson, English footballer
- Geoff Hunt, Australian squash player
- Geoff Hurst, English footballer, the only one to score a hat trick in a World Cup final
- Geoff Jenkins, Major League Baseball player
- Geoffrey Mutai, Kenyan marathon runner
- Geoff Ogilvy, Australian golfer
- Geoff Pullar, England and Lancashire cricketer
- Geoff Platt, Canadian–Belarusian ice hockey player
- Geoff Roes, ultra-runner, Western States 100 Endurance Run record holder
- Geoffrey Rono (born 1987), Kenyan middle-distance runner
- Geoff Rowley, professional skateboarder
- Geoff Sanderson, National Hockey League player
- Geoff Schwartz, American NFL football player
- Geoff Toovey, rugby league coach for the Manly-Warringah Sea Eagles
- Geoff Wheel, Welsh rugby union player

==== In politics ====
- Geoffrey Clifton-Brown, British politician
- Geoff Corkish (1953–2025), Manx politician
- Geoffrey Cox (British politician), British politician
- Geoff Davis, former Kentucky Congressional Representative
- Geoff Diehl, former Massachusetts State Representative
- Geoffrey Dickens, British politician
- Geoffrey Hirsch, American politician
- Geoffrey Howe (1926–2015), British Conservative politician and Deputy Prime Minister
- Geoffrey Mutiwa, Ugandan politician
- Geoff Plant (born 1955), Canadian retired politician

==== In writing ====
- Geoffrey Household (1900–1988), British writer
- Geoff Johns, American writer of comic books
- Geoffrey Moorhouse (1931–2009), British writer
- Geoff Nicholson (1953–2025), British novelist and non-fiction writer
- Geoff Thompson (writer), British writer, film director and self-defence expert

==== In other fields ====
- Geoffrey Ashe (1923–2022), British historian
- Geoffrey Beene (1927–2004), American fashion designer, born Samuel Albert Bozeman Jr
- Geoffrey Norman Blainey, Australian historian and political commentator
- Geoff Dixon, Australian corporate executive
- Geoffrey Durham (born 1949), British comedy magician and actor
- Geoffrey Rudolph Elton, British historian of the Tudor period
- Geoffrey Evans (1940–2012), English-born Irish serial killer
- Geoffrey C. Hazard Jr., American law professor
- Geoffrey Hinton, British computer scientist
- Geoffrey Langlands (1917–2019), British Army officer and educator
- Geoffroy Lejeune (born 1988), French journalist
- Geoff Lloyd, British radio DJ
- Geoffrey Ma, Hong Kong judge
- Geoffrey Massey (1924–2020), Canadian architect and urban planner
- Geoff Morrell (spokesperson), American journalist and public affairs official
- Geoffrey Pleyers, Belgian sociologist and researcher
- Geoffrey Russom, American philologist
- Geoffrey See, entrepreneur and startup ecosystem builder in North Korea
- Geoffrey Tantum (1940–2024), British spymaster

=== Fictional characters ===
- Geoffrey the Giraffe, mascot of the Toys R Us chain of toy stores
- Geoffrey St. John, member of King Acorn's Secret Service in the Sonic Archie comics

== See also ==
- Gioffre Borgia (c. 1481–c. 1516), Italian noble, illegitimate son of Pope Alexander VI and brother of Lucrezia and Cesare Borgia
- Galfrid
- Gofraid
- Godfrey (name)
- Gottfried, Godefroy, Goffredo
- Jeffrey (given name)
- Jeffries, Jeffers
- Jeoffrey, given name
