= Godfrey =

Godfrey may refer to:

== People ==
- Godfrey (name), a given name and surname
- Godfrey (comedian) (born 1969), American comedian and actor

== Places ==
=== In the United States ===
- Godfrey, Georgia, an unincorporated community
- Godfrey, Illinois, a village
- Godfrey, Kansas, an unincorporated community
- Godfrey, Washington, a ghost town
- Godfrey, West Virginia, an unincorporated community

=== Elsewhere ===
- Godfrey, Ontario, a Canadian community

== Fiction ==
- Glorious Godfrey, often known just by the name "Godfrey", a DC Comics supervillain
- Private Godfrey, a character from Dad's Army
- Queen Goodfey, supporting character of Mysticons, in which she is the kind and brave ruler of the people of Drake City on planet Gemina.
