= Norman England (disambiguation) =

Norman England refers to England after the Norman invasion.

Norman England may also refer to:

- Norman England (writer), an American writer and filmmaker based in Japan
- Norman England, a pen name of writer Godfrey Webb
- Norman England, a 1997 book by Trevor Rowley
