= Gofraid =

- The Gofraidh variant in Gaelic type (the lenited d in the name, today rendered dh, once appeared in Irish orthography with a dot above it, as pictured).
- Gender: Masculine
- Language: Irish

Origin
- Language: Old Norse
- Derivation: Guðfriðr, sometimes Guðrøðr

Other names
- Variant forms: Irish: Gofraidh; Old Irish through Middle Irish and Middle Gaelic: Gofhraidh; modern Scottish Gaelic: Goraidh, Goiridh
- Cognates: Gottfried, Godefroy, Godfredus; Godred, Guthred, Guthfrith Godredus
- Anglicisations: Goffraid, Godfrey, Geoffrey

Gofraid is an Irish masculine given name, arising in the Old Irish and Middle Irish/Middle Gaelic languages, as Gofhraidh, and later partially Anglicised as Goffraid.

Gofraid corresponds to the Old Norse Guðfriðr, cognate with Gottfried or Godfredus, and Galfrid or Galfridus. Gofraid/Gofhraidh was sometimes also used for Guðrøðr (partially Anglicized as Godred, Guthred, or Guthfrith, Latinised as Godredus).

Gofraid can be Anglicised as Godfrey, Geoffrey or Caffrey.

The lenited variant spelling Gofraidh (or Gofraiḋ, with a diacritic in the older Irish orthography, especially in Gaelic type), was influenced by the Old French Godefroy.

Goraidh and, less commonly, Goiridh are equivalents in the Scottish Gaelic language (from Guðrøðr).

== Notable people bearing this name ==
- Godred Crovan (died 1095), also known as "Gofraid", "Gofraidh", and "Gofhraidh", King of Dublin and the Isles
- Godred Olafsson (died 1187), also known as "Gofraid", King of Dublin and the Isles
- Gofraid Donn (died 1231), King in the Isles
- Gofraidh Fionn Ó Dálaigh, (died 1387), an Irish poet and Chief Ollam of Ireland
- Gofraid mac Amlaíb meic Ragnaill (died 1075), King of Dublin
- Gofraid mac Arailt (died 989), King of the Isles
- Gofraidh mac Briain Mac an Bhaird, (fl. 16th century), an Irish bardic poet
- Gofraid mac Domnaill (died 1212/1213), Scottish rebel
- Gofraid mac Fergusa, supposed 9th-century Gaelic nobleman
- Gofraid mac Sitriuc (died 951), King of Dublin
- Gofraid mac Sitriuc (died 1070), King of the Isles, father of Fingal mac Gofraid
- Gofraid of Lochlann, 9th-century Viking king
- Gofraid ua Ímair (died 934), King of Dublin and Northumbria
- Goraidh Mac Eachann MacAlasdair (fl. 16th century), chief of Clan MacAlister
- Guðrøðr Magnússon (fl. 1275), son of Magnús Óláfsson, King of Mann and the Isles

== See also ==
- Galfrid
- Geoffrey, Geoffroy (surname), Jeffrey, Jeffries, Jeffers
- Godred/Guðrøðr
- Gottfried, Godfrey, Godefroy, Goffredo
- Gruffudd/Gruffydd, Griffith (name), Griffith (surname), Griffiths
