= Goffredo =

Goffredo is an Italian given name, cognate with Godfrey, Gottfried, Galfrid, etc. Notable people with the name include:

- Goffredo Alessandrini (1904–1978), Italian script writer and film director
- Goffredo Baur, Italian cross country skier who competed in the 1930s
- Goffredo Borgia (1481–1517), the youngest son of Pope Alexander VI and Vannozza dei Cattanei, member of the House of Borgia
- Goffredo Cappa (1644–1717), Italian luthier, known for his violins and cellos
- Goffredo da Castiglione, Pope Celestine IV (died 1241)
- Goffredo Fofi (1937–2025), Italian essayist, activist, journalist and critic
- Goffredo (died 1194), Patriarch of Aquileia in northern Italy from 1182 to 1194
- Goffredo Lagger (1901–1984), Italian Olympic biathlete
- Goffredo Lombardo (1920–2005), Italian film producer
- Goffredo Malaterra, eleventh-century Benedictine monk and historian, possibly of Norman origin
- Goffredo Mameli (1827–1849), Italian patriot, poet, and writer was a notable figure in the Italian Risorgimento
- Goffredo Parise (1929–1986), Italian writer and journalist
- Goffredo Petrassi (1904–2003), Italian composer of modern classical music, conductor, and teacher
- Goffredo Ridello (died 1084), the Duke of Gaeta as a vassal of the Prince of Capua from 1067 or 1068
- Goffredo Sommavilla (1850–1944), Italian painter, mainly of genre themes
- Goffredo Stabellini (1925–2012), Italian professional football player
- Goffredo da Trani (died 1245), Italian jurist, known as a canon lawyer
- Goffredo da Viterbo (1120–1196), Roman Catholic chronicler, either Italian or German
- Goffredo Zehender (1901–1958), Italian racing driver

== See also ==
- A.C. Castellana Castel Goffredo, Italian association football club located in Castel Goffredo, Lombardy
- Castel Goffredo, a comune in the province of Mantua, in Lombardy, Italy
- Tortello amaro di Castel Goffredo, a type of stuffed pasta like ravioli and recognized traditional food product of the Lombardy region
- Galfrid
- Godefroy (disambiguation)
- Godfrey (name)
- Geoffrey
- Gottfried
