= Whisenton =

Whisenton is a surname. Notable people with the surname include:

- Joffre T. Whisenton, African-American academic administrator
- Larry Whisenton (born 1956), American baseball player
