= Ernest Charteris Holford Wolff =

British colonial administrator (1875-1946)

Ernest Charteris Holford Wolff CMG

British Resident of Pahang
- In office 1924–1928
- Preceded by: Edward Shaw Hose
- Succeeded by: James William Simmons

Personal details
- Born: 3 July 1875
- Died: 26 April 1946 (aged 70) Winchester, England
- Occupation: Colonial administrator

Ernest Charteris Holford Wolff CMG (3 July 1875 – 26 April 1946) was a British colonial administrator who served in the Straits Settlements and the Federated Malay States.

== Career ==
After graduating with a BA in Greats (Classics) at Oxford University, Wolff entered the Malay Civil Service in 1897 as a cadet in Pahang. He subsequently served in various posts including Head of the Postal and Telegraph departments, Kuala Lipis (1899), Assistant District Officer, Pekan (1900), assistant to the Residents of Negeri Sembilan, and Selangor (1901-2), Chairman of the Sanitary Board, Seremban (1904), District Treasurer, Telok Anson (1906), acting Secretary to the Resident Negeri Sembilan (1907), assistant secretary to the Resident-General (1909), District Officer, Kuantan (1909), District Officer, Upper Perak (1911), District Officer Larut (1912), and Superintendent of Convict Establishments and Inspector of Prisons (1915).

In 1915, he joined the Colonial Secretariat in Singapore as assistant Colonial Secretary of the Straits Settlements, and in 1923 was sworn in as a member of the Legislative Council of the Straits Settlements for a term of three years. In 1921, he had also served as Assistant Colonial Secretary to the Federated Malay States. In 1923, he was appointed Director of Education of the Straits Settlements and the Federated Malay States.

In 1924, after briefly serving as acting British Adviser in Kedah, he was appointed British Resident of Negeri Sembilan where he remained until 1927. He then served briefly as acting Colonial Secretary of the Straits Settlements, returning to Negeri Sembilan as Resident until his retirement in 1928.

== Personal life and death ==
Wolff married Mary Lilias Alison on 6 December 1912. He died on 26 April 1946 in Winchester, England, aged 70.

== Honours ==
Wolff was appointed Companion of the Order of St Michael and St George (CMG) in the 1928 New Year Honours.
