= Gottfried =

- Pronunciation: German: [ˈɡɔtfʁiːt]
- Gender: Masculine

Gottfried is a masculine German given name. It is derived from the Old High German name Godafrid, recorded since the 7th century, and composed of the elements god- (conflated from the etyma for "God" and "good", and possibly further conflated with gaut) and frid- ("peace" or "protection").

The German name was commonly hypocoristically abbreviated as Götz from the late medieval period. Götz and variants (including Göthe, Göthke and Göpfert) also came into use as German surnames. Gottfried is also a common surname among Ashkenazi Jews.

== Given name ==
The given name Gottfried became extremely frequent in Germany in the High Middle Ages, to the point of eclipsing most other names in God- (such as Godabert, Gotahard, Godohelm, Godomar, Goduin, Gotrat, Godulf, etc.) The name was Latinised as Godefridus. Medieval bearers of the name include:

- Gotfrid, Duke of Alemannia and Raetia (d. 709)
- Godefrid (d. c. 720), son of Drogo of Champagne, Frankish nobleman.
- Godfrid Haraldsson (d. c. 856), Danish Viking leader
- Godfrid, Duke of Frisia (d. 885), Danish Viking leader
- Godfrey, Count Palatine of Lotharingia (d. 949)
- Godfrey I, Duke of Lower Lorraine (d. 964)
- Geoffrey I "Greymantle", Count of Anjou (d. 987)
- Geoffrey I, Duke of Brittany (d. 1008)
- Godfrey II, Duke of Lower Lorraine (d. 1023)
- Geoffrey II "the Hammer", Count of Anjou (d. 1060)
- Godfrey III, Duke of Lower Lorraine (d. 1069)
- Godfrey of Bouillon (Godefridus Bullionensis, Godefroy de Bouillon, d. 1100), Frankish knight and leader of the First Crusade
- Gottfried II of Raabs (d. c. 1137), burgrave of Nuremberg
- Gottfried of Admont (d. 1165), Benedictine abbot
- Geoffrey II, Duke of Brittany (d. c. 1181)
- Geoffrey of Clairvaux (d. after 1188), Cistercian abbot
- Godfrey of Viterbo (Godefridus Viterbiensis, c. 1120 – c. 1196)
- Geoffrey of Vinsauf (fl. 1200), medieval grammarian
- Gottfried von Strassburg (d. 1210), author of a Middle High German courtly romance
- Geoffrey of Villehardouin (d. c. 1212), knight and historian of the Fourth Crusade
- Gottfried von Hohenlohe (1265–1310), Grand Master of the Teutonic Order
- Gottfried von Hagenau (died 1313), poet, theologian and medical doctor from Alsace

A notable early modern bearer of the name is Gottfried Wilhelm von Leibniz (1646–1716).

Gottfried remains comparatively popular in Germany, ranking in the top 200 masculine given names.

== Surname ==
- Gesche Gottfried (1785–1831), German serial killer
- John Gottfried (1917–1980), Canadian politician
- Martha Joy Gottfried (1925–2014), American landscape painter
- Robert W. Gottfried (1926–2007), American entrepreneur
- Martin Gottfried (1933–2014), American critic, columnist and author
- Dan Gottfried (born 1939), Israeli jazz pianist and lawyer
- Paul Gottfried (born 1941), American political and philosophy professor
- Richard Gottfried (born 1947), American politician
- Brian Gottfried (born 1952), American tennis player
- Gilbert Gottfried (1955–2022), American comedian and actor
- Mark Gottfried (born 1964), American basketball coach
- Keith Gottfried (born 1966), American lawyer

== See also ==
- Galfrid
- Geoffrey, Geoffroy (surname), Jeffrey, Jeffries, Jeffers
- Godred/Guðrøðr
- Gofraid/Goraidh
- Godfrey, Godefroy
