= Joffrey =

Joffrey can refer to:

== People ==
- Robert Joffrey (1930–1988), American dancer and founder of the Joffrey Ballet company
- Joffrey Bazié (born 2003), Burkinabé footballer
- Joffrey Cuffaut (born 1988), French footballer
- Joffrey Lauvergne (born 1991), French basketball player
- Joffrey Lupul (born 1983), Canadian retired ice hockey player
- Joffrey Reynolds (born 1979), Canadian former football player
- Jeoffry (fl. 1759–1763), the cat of poet Christopher Smart

== Other uses ==
- Joffrey Ballet, an American ballet company
- Joffrey Tower, a Chicago highrise
- Joffrey Baratheon, a character from George R. R. Martin's series A Song of Ice and Fire and the television adaptation Game of Thrones

== See also ==
- Geoffrey (name)
- Joffre (disambiguation)
- Jophery Brown (1945–2014), American stuntman, actor and baseball pitcher
