= Martha Joy Gottfried =

Mexican artist (1925–2014)

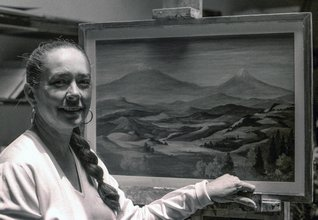
- Martha Joy in 1995.
- Born: Martha Joy Young; September 15, 1925; Glendale, Arizona, U.S.
- Died: January 10, 2014 (aged 88); Coyoacán, Mexico City, Mexico
- Education: San Carlos Academy
- Known for: Painting

Martha Joy Gottfried née Young (September 15, 1925 – January 10, 2014) was a prominent American-born Mexican landscape painter.

== Biography ==
Gottfried was born on September 15, 1925, in Glendale, Arizona, to Samuel Joy and Helen Young. She was the oldest of four children, her siblings were Mariam, Helen and Samuel. As a child she showed a natural inclination for painting. While attending Stephens College for women in Columbia, Missouri, she met her husband, Mario Héctor Gottfried, a pilot of the U.S. Army Air Corps. and the two were married in January 1945, at a Methodist church in Glendale, Arizona. The couple lived in the United States before moving to Mexico City in 1945. They were married for more than 55 years, most of which were spent at their home in Coyoacán. Their four children, Mario Héctor, Maria Elena, Carlos Federico and Martha Cecilia were raised there.

As a young mother in Mexico, Gottfried used drafts or watercolors as techniques.

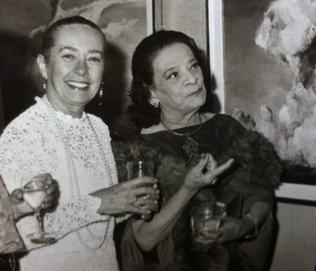
Martha Joy with Irene de Bohus in 1977.

She took lessons with Martha Sauer (1953–1954) and Gordon D. Jones (1955–1956). Subsequently, she entered the Academy of San Carlos in Mexico City, from 1958 to 1959. The sculptor Ignacio Asúnsolo was also one of her teachers during this period.

Over the years, she continued learning from other well-known artists, among them: Irene de Bohus (1959–1962), Toby Joysmith and Juan O'Gorman, who shared his tempera techniques with her.

In 1974, Gottfried presented her first individual exhibition at a gallery in the Mexican-American Institute of Cultural Relations in Mexico City. In the ensuing years, she held many other exhibitions, including at the Instituto Anglo-Americano de Cultura; Polyforum Cultural Siqueiros (1983); Palacio de Minería("Palace of Mining") (1992) and Museo de la Estampa ("Museum of Graphic Arts") (1994). She also held exhibitions at the México City and Cancún, Quintana Roo Airports. In 2004, she exhibited at Palacio de la Escuela de Medicina ("Medical School Palace") and in 2007 at the Club de Industriales("Industrial Club"), in Polanco. Besides her numerous exhibitions in and out of México, many of her paintings have been auctioned around the world.

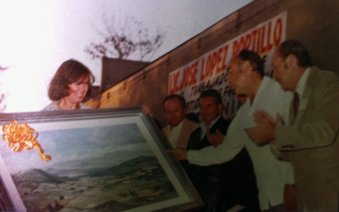
José López Portillo receiving Martha's Joy painting in 1976.

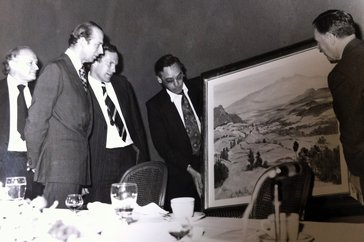
The Duke of Kent receiving one of Martha's Joy paintings (1978).

Some of her works were acquired by distinguished institutions and notable persons. Among others, during an honorary ceremony held in México City's Iztapalapa in 1976, she presented a painting of the Valley of Mexico to José López Portillo. In December 1978, the Duke of Kent received one of her paintings in a ceremony held by the British Chamber of Commerce in Mexico.

It was estimated that Gottfried created around 700 paintings during the period 1969–1979. Much of her life was devoted to teaching in her own studio.

After a long fight with chronic kidney disease, she died of a heart stoppage on January 10, 2014, at the age of 88 in Mexico City.

== Pictorial work ==
Gottfried's work was inspired by light, weather and natural beauty in various places, such as Arizona, Himalayas and, particularly, Mexico. Her production is vast and punctuated by a strong interest in mountain ranges, deserts and majestic Mexican volcanoes, like the Iztaccihuatl and Popocatepetl of Central Mexico. In the words of the painter:

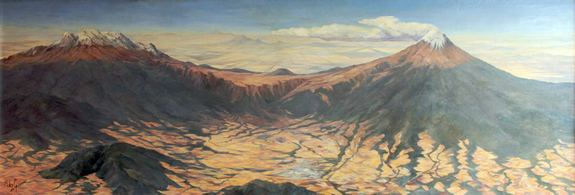
Popocatépetl & Iztaccíhuatl (1997), by Martha Joy.

"Distance, light, color, and vivid effect of these elements on a flat surface with pigments, is a continuous and enjoyable challenge. I try to capture the atmosphere of the places that I consider beautiful: mountains and deserts of Mexico are themes that I explore through my painting; its rugged and difficult terrain, the beauty of the shapes and textures of the earth, changes in color and light, as well as shadows, are a great subject for painters (to) enjoy during their lifetime."

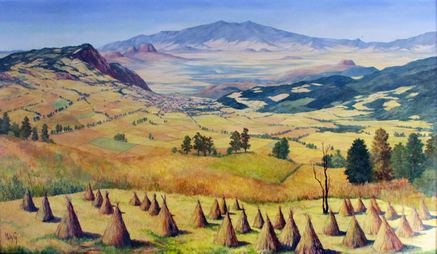
Autumn Sonnet (Grand Topilejo) (1995), by Martha Joy.

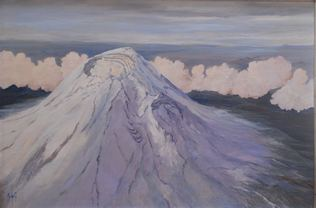
Fly by Popo (1994), by Martha Joy.

Constant motifs in her paintings, such as Topilejo or the Valley of Mexico, are always shown in different seasons or perspectives. This inclination for exploring all the possibilities in landscapes, along with her many trips, whether by sea land or air, led the press to call her "painter of all seasons". During some years she was especially interested in making "skyscapes ... landscapes viewed from an airplane". She commonly used the "Ruben's technique" to paint, "a monochrome oil sketch is done on canvas while on location and back in the studio details can be filled in".

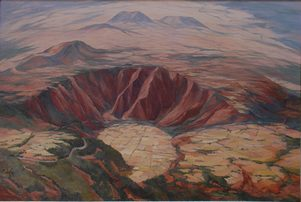
The Cliff (1994), by Martha Joy.

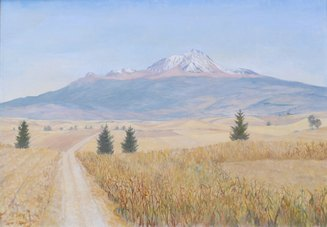
Nevado de Toluca (2008), by Martha Joy.

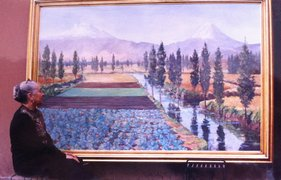
Martha Joy besides one of her paintings in 1995.

Her work, which includes hundreds of paintings and large-scale pieces, is significant to many art critics because, besides showing interesting ecological changes, it presents "factual responses to the natural scene". In this regard, Toby Joysmith states:

"They present no intellectual problems, nor concepts, nor searching. They are effortless to look at. Direct transcription, devoid of transformation, will always give the pure pleasure of recognition, as these paintings most certainly do."

== Example of representative works ==
- 1980: San Miguel de Allende
- 1987: North of Cave Creek
- 1987: Topilejo
- 1989: Iztaccíhuatl summer
- 1990: Urban sprawl
- 1991: From Sierra Chincua
- 1992: Popo & Izta
- 1992: Ajusco
- 1994: The Cliff
- 1994: Road to Yautepec
- 1994: Copper Canyon
- 1994: Fly by Popo
- 1994: Aerial of Anáhuac
- 1994: Zitácuaro Valley
- 1995: Valley of South Mexico II
- 1995: The Superstitions, Arizona
- 1995: Donato Guerra
- 1995: Autumn Sonnet (Grand Topilejo)
- 1997: Popocatépetl & Iztaccíhuatl
- 1997: Read Home(Topilejo)
- 1997: Red Cliff
- 2000: Valle de Bravo lake
- 2004: Pinacate
- 2008: Nevado de Toluca
- 2009: Xitle

== See also ==
- Juan O'Gorman
- Ignacio Asúnsolo
