= Edwin Pascoe =

English geologist

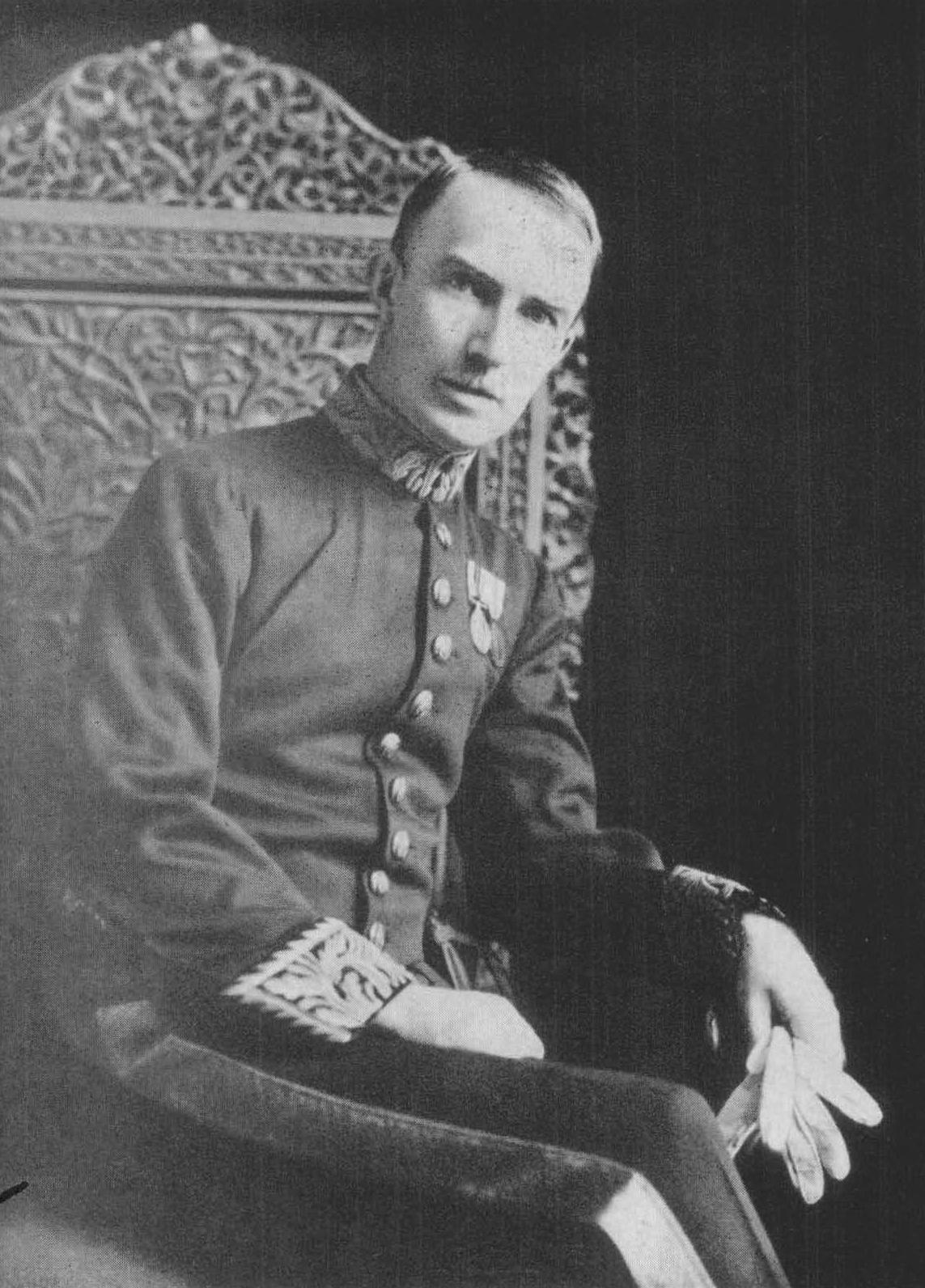

Sir Edwin Hall Pascoe (17 February 1878 – 7 July 1949) was an English geologist who worked in India with the Geological Survey of India. He proposed the idea that an Indo-Brahm river flowed between the rising Himalayas and Gondwanaland. The idea was that it was north of the current Gangetic plain and was shifted south with the rise of Himalayas and by deposition of soil by the river.

== Early life ==
Born in London to Edwin Pascoe and Mary A. Hall, he went to St John's College, Cambridge and joined the Geological Survey of India in 1905.

== Career ==
His early study in India was on the Great Kangra earthquake of 4 April 1905. He surveyed oil fields in Burma, Assam, Punjab, and on the Arabian Coast. He became the director of the GSI in 1921 and retired from it in 1932. He also worked with the Indian Museum and presided over the Indian School of Mines. He was a specialist on the Tertiary formations of India and hypothesized that the northern rivers of India (including the Brahmputra and the Ganges) flowed as one stream (the "Indobrahm" or the Shiwalik river of G.E. Pilgrim) draining west into the Arabian Sea. He revised and published the third edition of the Manual of the Geology of India whose first edition had been by H.B. Medlicott and W.T. Blanford in 1879 with a second edition in 1893 by R.D. Oldham.

He was knighted in the 1928 New Year Honours.
