= William Godfrey (disambiguation) =

William Godfrey was an English Roman Catholic cardinal.

William Godfrey may also refer to:

== Baronets ==
- Sir William Godfrey, 1st Baronet (1739–1817), MP for Tralee and Belfast
- Sir William Godfrey, 3rd Baronet (1797–1873), Anglo-Irish aristocrat and landowner
- Sir William Cecil Godfrey, 5th Baronet (1857–1926), of the Godfrey baronets
- Sir William Maurice Godfrey, 7th Baronet (1909–1971), of the Godfrey baronets
- Sir William Wellington Godfrey (1880–1952), British general

== Others ==
- William Godfrey, one pseudonym used by Sam Youd (1922–2012), known best as John Christopher
- W. G. Godfrey (1941–2008), Canadian historian
- William Godfrey (bishop) (born 1948), Anglican Bishop of Uruguay and of Peru

== See also ==
- Godfrey (name)
