= Guthfrith =

Guthfrith (one of many derived spellings of the Old Norse personal name Guðrøðr, also Anglicised as Godred) may refer to:

- Gudfred (r. 804–810), Danish king, son of King Sigfred
- Guthred, king of Northumbria (ruled c. 883 – 895)
- Gofraid ua Ímair (died 934), a.k.a. Gothfrith II, King of York
- Olaf III Guthfrithson (died 941), King of Dublin
- Gofraid mac Sitriuc (died 951), King of Dublin
