= Jeoffrey =

Jeoffrey is a given name. Notable people with the name include:

- Jeoffrey Benward (born 1952), American singer and songwriter
- Jeoff Long (1941–2026), American baseball player
- Jeoffrey Pagan (born 1993), American football player

== See also ==
- Geoffrey (name)
