= Robert Godfrey =

Robert Godfrey may refer to:

- Robert J. Godfrey (born 1937), British clergyman
- Robert John Godfrey (born 1947), musician
- W. Robert Godfrey, American clergyman

== See also ==
- Bob Godfrey (1921–2013), English animator
- Bob Godfrey (born 1948), American politician from Connecticut
