= Richard Godfrey =

Richard Godfrey may refer to:

- Richard Godfrey (potter) (1949–2014), English studio potter
- Richard Godfrey (died 1642) (1592–1642), MP for New Romney
- Richard Godfrey (died 1631), MP for Salisbury
- Richard Godfrey (priest), priest and missionary in Melanesia
- Dick Godfrey (1888–1972), Australian rules footballer
- Richard Godfrey (politician) (1933–2025), former mayor of Normal, Illinois

== See also ==
- Richard Godfrey Rivers (1859–1925), English artist, active in Australia
