= Wilhelmina McAlpin Godfrey =

American artist

- Born: August 27, 1914; Philadelphia, Pennsylvania
- Died: May 13, 1994 (aged 79); Buffalo, New York
- Education: Art Institute of Buffalo; Albright Art School

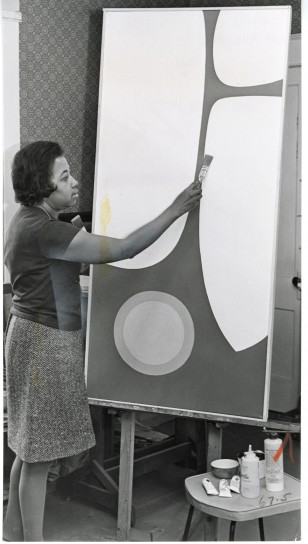
Wilhelmina Godfrey with her work Composition I, c. 1969; Image courtesy of the Burchfield Penney Art Center Archives

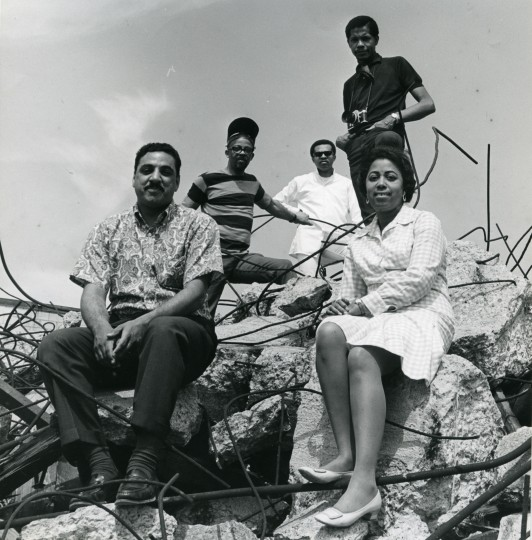
Godfrey with her fellow Langston Hughes Institute co-founders, clockwise from left: Jim Pappas, Allie Anderson, Clarence Scott and Hal Franklin. Image courtesy of the Burchfield Penney Art Center Archives.

Wilhelmina McAlpin Godfrey (August 27, 1914 – May 13, 1994) was an American painter, printmaker and textile artist, art educator and community activist in Buffalo, New York.

== Biography ==
Godfrey was born in Philadelphia, Pennsylvania. She was raised and educated in Buffalo, New York. She was married to William Godfrey Jr. and they had one child together, Carol Godfrey Wing. Wilhelmina Godfrey died on May 13, 1994, in Buffalo, New York.

== Education ==
Wilhelmina Godfrey attended Fosdick Masten Park High School in Buffalo, where she took all the art classes that the school offered. Although her schooling was interrupted by the Great Depression, she was able to continue her education in the 1940s receiving scholarships from the Art Institute of Buffalo and the Albright Art School of the Buffalo Fine Arts Academy, from which she graduated in 1949. In 1962, Godfrey completed studies in weaving at the Rochester Institute of Technology School for American Craftsmen.

== Career ==
Godfrey began her career as a painter and printmaker, later creating artworks in fiber beginning in the early 1960s. She actively promoted community arts efforts in western New York. Starting in the early 1950s, she organized and taught drawing and painting classes in Buffalo, at the YMCA on Michigan Ave and at St. Philip's Episcopal Church Community Center. From 1952 to 1963 Godfrey worked for AM&A's department store as an artist, but in 1963 she left to focus on her art.

Godfrey's early paintings depict the lives of Buffalo's east side residents. In 1958, after being inspired by an exhibition in Rochester, New York, she started weaving and began to create sculptures in fiber. Godfrey's textile works were abstract and often included motifs inspired by African art. She organized the University at Buffalo's weaving program and from 1967 to 1970, she taught at its Creative Craft Center.

Along with fellow artist Jim Pappas, sculptor/photographer Allie Anderson, graphic designer Clarence Scott, Godfrey co-founded the Langston Hughes Center for the Visual and Performing Arts (later renamed the Langston Hughes Institute), which strove to use art to improve social conditions, and to teach children to express creativity through dance, drawing, painting, weaving, graphic design, and ceramics. The Institute closed in 2015.

In 1974, Godfrey received a fellowship from the National Endowment for the Arts and a scholarship from Haystack Mountain School of Crafts, in Deer Isle, Maine. In 1977, she wrote that she was exploring "the influence of Africa on the black-American craftspeople working in the United States today." Two years later, in 1979, she presented at the National African American Crafts Conference Symposium on "The Negro Slave Crafts Workers of North and South Carolina."

Godfrey was commissioned to create artworks for St. Philip's Episcopal Church (a triptych altar painting) and Buffalo's St. Matthew's Episcopal Church (a pentaptych altar painting). In 1990, she received the Individual Artist Within the Community Award from the Buffalo and Erie County Arts Council. That same year, she exhibited at Medaille College.

Buffalo State College's Burchfield Penney Art Center houses several works by Godfrey, including the 1989 acrylic painting Sint Maarten (Dutch West Indies) and City Playground (1949–1950), the latter donated by her husband and daughter in 1994. In 2009, the center received a donation of 15 preliminary studies Godfrey made for City Playground that show her working process. Her textile work is also represented at the center: Face Fetish and Untitled (#22), incorporate African motifs. In 2018, collector Mark Dabney donated an extensive archive of materials relating to Wilhelmina Godfrey's career, including 350 color slides of her paintings, weavings, and prints and a 277-page copy of her manuscript, “From These Hands: Contemporary African-American Craftspeople of the 60’s and 70’s,” copyrighted 1980.

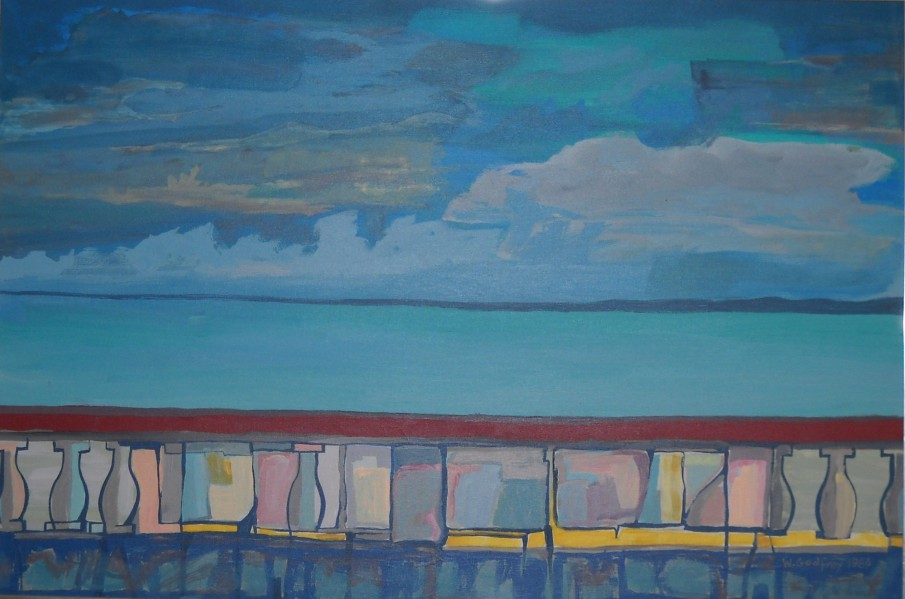
Sint Maarten, 1989; acrylic on canvas, 24 x 36 in. (61 x 91.4 cm); The M&T Bank Collection at the Burchfield Penney Art Center, 1991
