= Percy Godfrey (composer) =

English composer, conductor, organist and music teacher

Percy Godfrey (16 August 1859 – 30 January 1945) was an English composer, organist and music teacher, mostly active in the county of Kent.

== Education and career ==
Born in Croxall, Derbyshire, he studied at the University of Durham and the Royal Academy of Music, where his teachers included Sir George Macfarren and Ebenezer Prout. The Dutch violinist and composer Berthold Tours, who became a friend, was also an important early influence. After graduating he became a schoolmaster in Bengeo, Hertford before being appointed music-master and organist at The King's School, Canterbury. He conducted the East Kent Orchestra.

== Music ==
Godfrey's compositions extend up to 50 opus numbers. His prize-winning Coronation March, composed for Edward VII in 1902, was by far the best known of his works. It was the subject of extensive national press coverage at the time. The march was adapted as a hymn tune by Sir Frederick Bridge, and was also used at the overture for Leopold Wenzel's Our Crown, an imperial ballet staged at the Empire Theatre in May 1902. There is a modern recording.

Godfrey's Symphony No. 1 in G minor was composed in 1903 and later performed by Dan Godfrey (no relation) in Bournemouth and Hastings. There were three other symphonies, including the 3rd in A, performed in 1930 at the Leas Cliff Hall in Folkestone. Other orchestral works included a symphonic ballad, the Spanish Suite for chorus and orchestra (performed in Dover in 1907) and a military band suite which was performed by Souza on his American tours and in London.

Godfrey also composed chamber music, most notably his four movement Piano Quintet, op. 16, composed in 1900, which won the Lesley Alexander Prize. The suite A Dream of Dresden China is unusually scored for two violas, cello and piano. There were also three operas, organ pieces and part songs (such as The darksome night has gone). An archive of his scores and other materials is held by the Worshipful Company of Musicians.

== Later life ==
In the 1930s he and his wife were living in Folkestone at 32, Bouverie Square. She died in 1935. In the early 1940s he moved to East Molesey in Surrey to live with his sister Ethel Weir at 25, Spencer Road. He died there in February 1945, aged 85.
