= Edward Godfrey =

Edward Godfrey may refer to:

- Edward Settle Godfrey (1843–1932), general in the United States Army
- Edward S. Godfrey (physician) (1878–1960), physician and founder of the first U.S. Epidemiologic Society
- Edward S. Godfrey (judge), emeritus Dean and Professor at the University of Maine School of Law
- Edward Godfrey (colonial governor), first governor of the province of Maine

== See also ==
- Sir Edmund Berry Godfrey (1621–1678), English magistrate
