= Geoff Stone =

English footballer

Personal information
- Full name: Geoffrey Stone
- Date of birth: 10 April 1924
- Place of birth: Mansfield, England
- Date of death: August 1993 (aged 69)
- Place of death: Nottingham, England
- Position: Centre half

Youth career
- Beeston B.C.

Senior career*
Years	Team	Apps	(Gls)
1948–1950	Notts County	4	(0)
1950–1952	Darlington	31	(0)
- Consett
- * Club domestic league appearances and goals

Geoffrey Stone (10 April 1924 – August 1993) was an English footballer who made 35 appearances in the Football League playing as a centre half for Notts County and Darlington. He went on to play non-league football for Consett.
