= Joffre Pachito =

Ecuadorian footballer (born 1981)

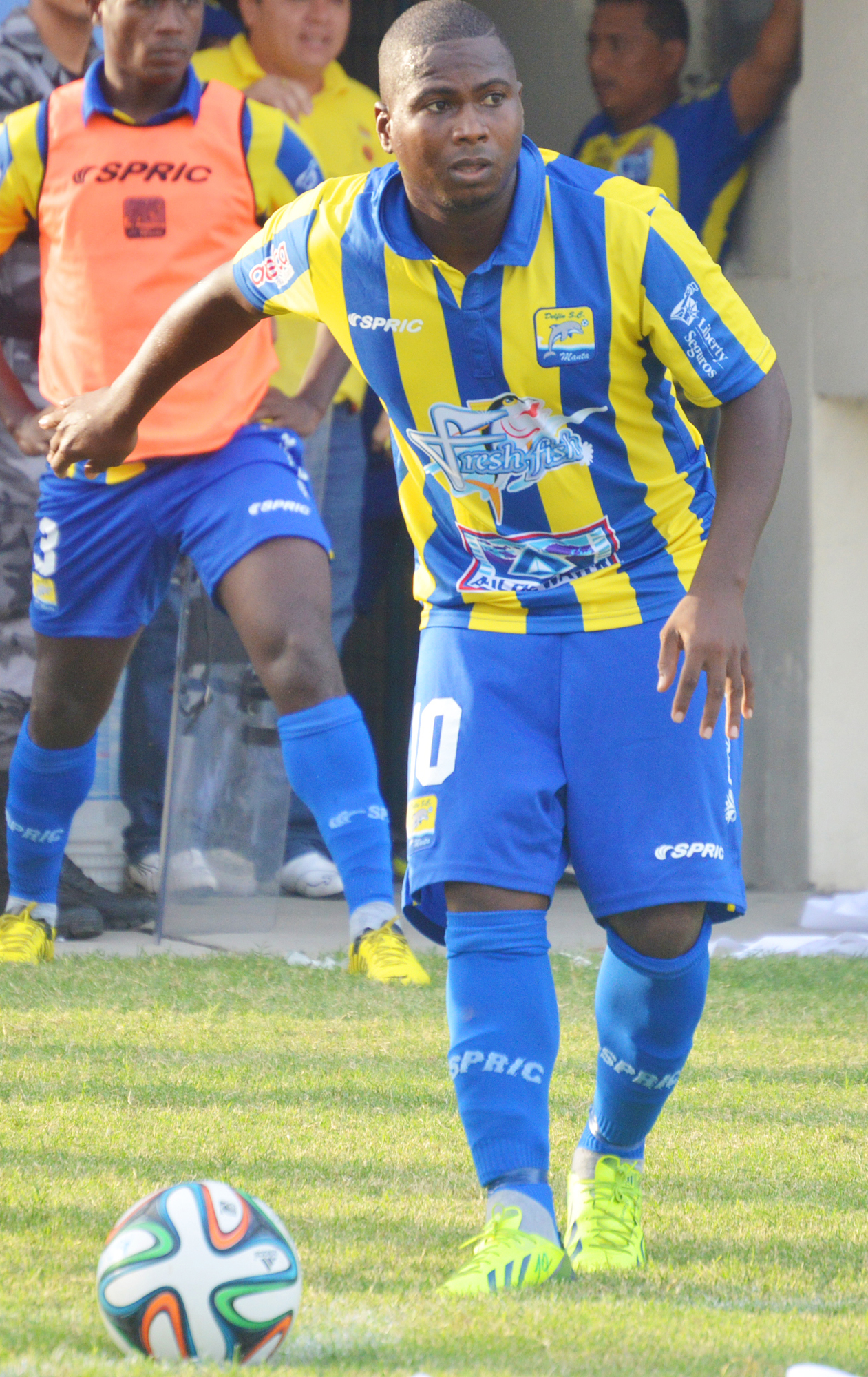

Personal information
- Full name: Joffre Pachito
- Date of birth: 31 December 1981 (age 44)
- Place of birth: Ecuador
- Position: Midfielder

Senior career*
Years	Team	Apps	(Gls)
- Emelec
- Panamá SC
- Peñarol de Manabí
- Deportivo Cuenca
- Olmedo
2008	Aucas	25	(6)
2009–	Sportivo Luqueño	4	(0)
- * Club domestic league appearances and goals as of 30 December 2008

Joffre Pachito (born December 31, 1981) is an Ecuadorian footballer recently playing for Sportivo Luqueño of Paraguay's first division.

== Club career ==
Pachito played for many clubs in Ecuador including Emelec, Panamá SC, Peñarol de Manabí, Deportivo Cuenca, Olmedo, and Aucas. For the 2008 season, he had to play in the second division with Aucas. He scored 6 goals in 25 appearances for Aucas.

In December 2008, Sportivo Luqueño's president, Fernando González, announced that they had signed Pachito. He will start playing for them in January 2009.

== Honours ==
Emelec

- Ecuadorian Serie A: 2001

Deportivo Cuenca

- Ecuadorian Serie A: 2004

Delfín SC

- Segunda Categoría: 2013
