= Godfrey, West Virginia =

Unincorporated community in West Virginia, United States

- Unincorporated community
- Location within the state of West Virginia Godfrey, West Virginia (the United States)
- Coordinates: 37°21′54″N 81°15′38″W
- Country: United States
- State: West Virginia
- County: Mercer
- Elevation: 2,287 ft (697 m)
- Time zone: UTC-5 (Eastern (EST))
  - Summer (DST): UTC-4 (EDT)
- Area codes: 304 & 681
- GNIS feature ID: 1554578

Godfrey is an unincorporated community and coal town in Mercer County, West Virginia, United States. Godfrey is 1 mile (1.6 km) northwest of Montcalm.

The community was named for A. I. Godfrey, the original owner of the town site.
