= Linda Godfrey =

South African engineer

Linda Keren Godfrey
- Education: University of KwaZulu-Natal; University of the Free State; Rhodes University
- Scientific career
- Workplaces: Council for Scientific and Industrial Research
- Thesis: The role of waste data in changing behaviour : the case of the South African waste information (2011)

Linda Keren Godfrey is a Principal Scientist at the Council for Scientific and Industrial Research in South Africa. She is a specialist in waste management and the circular economy in a developing country, or global south, context. She was elected a Fellow of the Royal Academy of Engineering and a member of the International Resource Panel in 2025.

== Early life and education ==
Godfrey majored in chemistry and geology, earning her Bachelor of Science (BSc) and BSc Honours degrees with distinction from Rhodes University. She obtained a Master's degree in hydrogeology with distinction from the University of the Free State. Godfrey earned her Doctorate in civil engineering from the University of KwaZulu-Natal, where she researched the role of waste data and information in integrated waste management.

Her academic background reflects interdisciplinary training across environmental and social sciences, environmental engineering, and policy.

== Research and career ==
Godfrey manages Circular Innovation South Africa (CISA), a program of the South African Department of Science, Technology and Innovation that aims to support the country’s transition to a circular, low-carbon economy through science, technology and innovation.

Her research interests include the circular economy and sustainable resource management in developing countries; integrated waste management; waste governance; waste information systems; economic and policy instruments in the waste sector; social and behavioural aspects of integrated waste management.

She led the development and implementation of South Africa's Waste Research, Development and Innovation (RDI) Roadmap (2015-2024), which advocated for value recovery from priority waste streams through science, technology and innovation, as a way of incentivizing the diversion of waste away from dumpsites. The Roadmap established the first dedicated waste SARChI Chairs in South Africa, including the Waste & Society SARChI Chair held by the University of the Western Cape.

In addition to her management and research roles, she holds an academic appointment as an Extraordinary Professor at North-West University, where she lectures on integrated waste management and the circular economy.

Her research outputs include peer reviewed journal papers, technical reports, policy briefs, book chapters and conference papers addressing waste management and resources management, circular economy and sustainability transitions. She has authored or co-authored more than 125 research and technical reports and numerous peer-reviewed publications.

She has provided strategic input for a number of local, regional and international waste and circular economy initiatives for the United Nations, European Commission, World Bank Group, South African Government, Academy of Science of South Africa, International Solid Waste Association, universities and businesses.

== Awards and International Recognition ==
In 2024, Godfrey was awarded the National Science and Technology Forum South32 Green Economy Award. Godfrey was elected an International Fellow of the Royal Academy of Engineering and a member of the International Resource Panel in 2025.

Godfrey has served on a number of technical advisory boards and expert panels in fields such as plastic pollution, resources, safer end of engineered life, waste technologies. She is a recognised international keynote speaker, bringing a global south perspective to waste and circular economy fora in Africa, Asia, Australia and Europe.

She has advocated for woman in the waste and resources sector, serving on the International Solid Waste Association Women of Waste (WOW!) Advisory Network. Co-authoring the ISWA Publication: Findings of the WOW! Global Survey II: Mapping the status of women in the global waste management sector.

== Publications ==
Godfrey was lead on the first circular economy technical reports for South Africa, co-authoring a series of briefing notes and technical reports on the opportunities provided by the circular economy in eight resource intensive sectors of the economy.

Notable scientific publications include:

- Winnie W Y Lau; Yonathan Shiran; Richard Bailey; et al. (23 July 2020). "Evaluating scenarios toward zero plastic pollution". Science. Bibcode:2020Sci...369.1455L. doi:10.1126/science.aba9475. ISSN 0036-8075. PMID 32703909. Wikidata Q97681094.
- S. Khan; B. Maphalala; Z. Nontso; F. Magweregwede; L. Godfrey (2025). South Africa's mineral resource availability as a potential driver for transitioning to a circular economy. J. S. Afr. Inst. Min. Metall., 125(2). https://doi.org/10.17159/2411-9717/742/2025
- Godfrey, L., Sithole, B., Jacob John, M., Mturi, G. and Muniyasamy, S. (2022). Transitioning to a Circular Economy in South Africa: The Role of Innovation in Driving Greater Waste Valorization. In: Ren, J., Zhang, L. (eds) Circular Economy and Waste Valorisation. Industrial Ecology and Environmental Management, vol 2. Springer, Cham. https://doi.org/10.1007/978-3-031-04725-1_7
- Godfrey, L. and Oelofse, S. (2017). Historical Review of Waste Management and Recycling in South Africa. Resources 6 (4), 57 https://doi.org/10.3390/resources6040057
- Godfrey, L. (2021). Quantifying economic activity in the informal recycling sector in South Africa. S Afr J Sci. 117 (9/10), Art. #8921. https://doi.org/10.17159/sajs.2021/8921
- Linda Godfrey (10 January 2019). "Waste Plastic, the Challenge Facing Developing Countries—Ban It, Change It, Collect It?". Recycling. 4 (1): 3. doi:10.3390/recycling4010003. ISSN 2313-4321. Wikidata Q128567245.
- Anton Nahman; Willem de Lange; Suzan Oelofse; Linda Godfrey (17 May 2012). "The costs of household food waste in South Africa". Waste Management. 32 (11): 2147–2153. doi:10.1016/j.wasman.2012.04.012. ISSN 0956-053X. PMID 22608682. Wikidata Q43344337.
