= Frédéric Godefroy =

French author (1826-1897)

Frédéric-Eugène Godefroy, (French pronunciation: [fʁedeʁik øʒɛn ɡɔdəfʁwa]; 13 February 1826, Paris – 30 September 1897, Lestelle-Bétharram) was a French author, notable for his works on the history of the French language, notably compiling a 10-volume Old French dictionary of over 20,000 pages.

== Publications ==
- Histoire de la littérature française depuis le XVIe siècle jusqu’à nos jours, 1859–1863
- Lexique comparée de la langue de Corneille et de la langue du XVIIe siècle en général, 1862
- Morceaux choisis des prosateurs et poètes français des XVIIe, XVIIIe et XIXe siècles, 1872
- L’Instrument de la revanche. Études sur les principaux collèges chrétiens, 3 vol., 1872
- Morceaux choisis des prosateurs et poètes français du 9e au XVIe, gradués en cinq cours
- Histoire de la littérature française, depuis le XVIe siècle jusqu'à nos jours, 15 volumes
- La Mission de Jeanne d’Arc, 1878
- Dictionnaire de l’ancienne langue française du IXe siècle au XVe siècle, 1881
