= Steve Godfrey =

Steve Godfrey, Steven Godfrey, or Stephen Godfrey is the name of:

- Steve Godfrey (medium), host of U.S. radio show The Other Side
- Stephen Godfrey (1953–1993), senior feature writer for Canadian newspaper The Globe and Mail
- Steve Godfrey, member of English rock band Switches
- "Sir" Stephen Godfrey, ex-member of U.S. country band Vince Vance & The Valiants
- Steven Godfrey, manager of public relations for TNA (Total Nonstop Action Wrestling)
