= Godefroid =

Godefroid is both a masculine given name and a surname. Notable people with the name include:

== Given name ==
- Prince Godefroid Kamatari (1957–2005), grandson of mwami HM Mutaga IV Mbikije of Burundi, and a son of HRH Prince Ignace Kamatari
- Godefroid Kurth (1847–1916), Belgian historian
- Godefroid Mukeng'a Kalond (1930–2026), Congolese Roman Catholic archbishop
- Godefroid Munongo (1925–1992), politician of the Democratic Republic of the Congo

== Surname ==
- Félix Godefroid (1818–1897), Belgian harpist, who composed for his instrument and for the piano
- Marie-Éléonore Godefroid (1778–1849), French painter
- Sébastien Godefroid (born 1971), Belgian sailor
