= Gudrød =

Gudrød may refer to:

- Gudfred (Danish king, ruled from 804 or earlier until 810)
- Gudrød the Hunter (semi-legendary king in Vingulmark in south-east Norway, from 804 until 810)
- Gudrød Bjørnsson (ruled Vestfold until 968)
