= Charles Godfrey (Australian cricketer) =

Australian cricketer (1860–1940)

Personal information
- Full name: Charles George Godfrey
- Born: 17 November 1860; Adelaide, Colony of South Australia
- Died: 27 March 1940 (aged 79); Rose Park, South Australia
- Batting: Right-handed
- Role: Batsman

Domestic team information
- Years: Team
- 1885/86–1888/89: South Australia

Career statistics
Competition	First-class
Matches	5
Runs scored	356
Batting average	39.55
100s/50s	1/2
Top score	119
Catches/stumpings	5/–
- Source: ESPNcricinfo, 16 February 2022

Charles George Godfrey (17 November 1860 – 27 March 1940) was an Australian cricketer. A right-handed batsman, he played in five first-class matches for South Australia between 1885 and 1889.
