= Patrick Godfrey (engineer) =

British professor and civil engineer

- Born: 1946 (age 79–80); London
- Education: Imperial College London
- Engineering career
- Discipline: Structural engineer
- Institutions: Institution of Civil Engineers
- Practice name: Halcrow
- Projects: T5

Patrick Godfrey (born 1946 in London) is a British civil engineer, professor of systems engineering at the University of Bristol, and director of the Systems Centre and the EPSRC Industrial Doctorate Centre in Systems at the University of Bristol and the University of Bath.

== Early life ==
Godfrey was born in 1946. His first passion was sailing but he left school to read civil engineering at Imperial College.

== Career ==
After graduating Godfrey worked for Halcrow, consulting engineers, and was asked to go to the Seychelles to supervise marine works. He was part of the team that designed and constructed the Royal Sovereign Lighthouse. By 1973 Godfrey was working on various offshore projects. In particular, he was a leading member of the group that designed and built an experimental offshore tower in Christchurch Bay. Godfrey then led the team advising New Zealand's Petrocorp about the engineering of the Maui field off the west coast of North Island. Godfrey became managing director of Halcrow Offshore in the late 1980s. Later he was asked to use his experience in oil and gas to the core Halcrow civil engineering business.

Godfrey was part author of the Engineering Council Code of Practice and Guidelines on Risk Issues. As a result, in 1993 he was commissioned by the Construction Industry Research and Information Association to produce a client's guide to controlling risk. At Halcrow he was asked to find ways of reducing the risks of ship collisions at the Second Severn Crossing whilst also saving money. The success of this project led directly to his appointment as consultant to the British Airports Authority on Heathrow Terminal 5 to manage risks to the project during the 4 years of the public enquiry.

In the early 1990s, Godfrey was appointed visiting professor of civil engineering systems at the University of Bristol. He co-authored with David Blockley ’Doing it Differently—Systems for Rethinking Construction’ which was awarded a Chartered Institute of Building (CIOB), Gold Medal and Author of the Year in 2000.

In 2006 Godfrey was appointed professor of systems engineering at the University of Bristol, and director of the Systems Centre and the EPSRC Industrial Doctorate Centre in Systems at the University of Bristol and the University of Bath.

== Awards ==
- Hon DEng 2004 University of Bristol
- CIOB Gold Medal 2000
- INCOSE Fellows award 2013 for innovations in the management of complex systems through integration of "soft" and "hard" systems approaches in practice, education and research

== Selected projects ==
- Heathrow T5
- Experimental offshore tower in Christchurch Bay
