= Godfrey Sperling =

American journalist

Godfrey Sperling Jr. (September 25, 1915 – September 11, 2013) was an American journalist for The Christian Science Monitor. Sperling was best known for running breakfasts in Washington, D.C. that journalists and politicians frequented.

== Biography ==
Godfrey Sperling Jr. was born in Long Beach, California, on September 25, 1915. His father was one of Idaho's first civil engineers. He grew up in Urbana, Illinois, and graduated from the University of Illinois Urbana-Champaign. As a child he was often referred to by the nickname "Budge", which would stick for the rest of his life. Sperling began working for The Christian Science Monitor (CSM) in 1946.

Sperling was also a member of the Gridiron Club.

=== Breakfasts ===
From 1966 to 2001, Sperling hosted 3,241 breakfasts in Washington, D.C. which were attended by journalists and politicians. For their first few years, the breakfasts were held at the National Press Club, and limited to twenty attendees; later on they were often held at the Carlton Hotel.

=== Later career and death ===
Sperling retired from journalism in September 2005. He died on September 11, 2013.

Sperling's papers are held by the University of Illinois.
