= Charles Godfrey (English cricketer) =

English cricketer

Charles John Melville Godfrey (24 November 1862 — 28 September 1941) was an English cricketer. He was a right-handed batsman and a right-arm fast bowler. He was born in Upper Clapton and died in Great Chesterford.

Having represented Oxford University between 1882 and 1885, Godfrey played for Sussex in 1885, 1889, 1890 and 1892.

Godfrey played in four matches in 1889. The following season saw the inaugural County Championship campaign, in which Godfrey played four games, and achieved his best bowling, a return of five wickets for 22 runs in the match against Yorkshire. Having sat out of the 1891 season, he made a single, final first-class appearance in 1892, also against Yorkshire.

Godfrey was educated at Magdalen College School, Oxford, and Hertford College, Oxford. Outside cricket, he became a clergyman, and the notice of his death in The Times in 1941 states that he was lately the vicar of St Michael and All Angels' Church, South Beddington, Surrey.
