= Eugène Godfried =

Eugène Edward Godfried Presilia (23 October 1952 – 29 March 2009) was a black Curaçao-born political activist and broadcaster. Educated in the Netherlands, he earned a degree in social services and spoke many languages, including English, French, Spanish, Papiamento, and Haitian Creole, which aided him as he interviewed foreign dignitaries. As a leader of the Action Committee for a Socialist Movement he participated in the Anti-Imperialist Organizations of the Caribbean and Central America collective in the 1980s. Godfried was the director of the Caribbean desk at Radio Havana Cuba and also contributed to Radio Progreso, Radio Rebelde, and Radio Taíno.

Godfried died in Willemstad, at the age of 56, on 29 March 2009, following a stroke on 21 March.
