= Percy Godfrey =

American football coach and college athletics administrator

Biographical details
- Born: February 5, 1899; Saint Paul, Minnesota, U.S.
- Died: March 31, 1930 (aged 31); Baltimore, Maryland, U.S.

Coaching career (HC unless noted)
- 1920: Pillsbury Military Academy (MN)
- 1923–1925: Southeastern State Teachers (OK)

Administrative career (AD unless noted)
- 1920: Pillsbury Military Academy (MN)
- 1923–1926: Southeastern State Teachers (OK)

Head coaching record
- Overall: 16–9–3 (college)

Percy Downing Godfrey (February 5, 1899 – March 31, 1930) was an American football coach and college athletics administrator. He served as the head football coach at Southeastern State Teachers College—now known as Southeastern Oklahoma State University—from 1923 to 1925, compiling a record of 16–9–3. Godfrey died on March 31, 1930.

== Head coaching record ==
=== College ===
Year	Team	Overall	Conference	Standing	Bowl/playoffs
Southeastern State Savages (Oklahoma Intercollegiate Conference) (1923–1925)
1923	Southeastern State	10–1			
1924	Southeastern State	4–4	4–2	2nd	
1925	Southeastern State	2–4–2	0–4–1	10th	
Southeastern State:		16–9–3			
Total:		16–9–3			
