= British Chamber of Commerce in Mexico =

Non-profit that promotes trade between Mexico and the UK

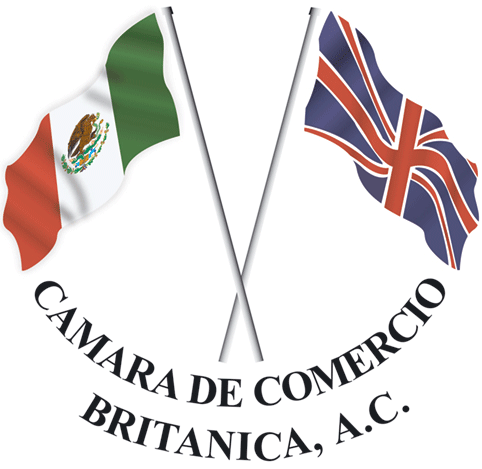
Logo

The British Chamber of Commerce in Mexico is an independent non-profit organisation that promotes trade between Mexico and the UK. The Chamber is a non-profit organization and, therefore, independent of any government. The British Chamber of Commerce in Mexico is one of the European Chambers in Mexico with the highest membership rate, and it is also one of the most active British Chambers in Latin America.

== History ==
The British Chamber of Commerce was founded in Mexico City on the 24th of June 1921 when a Charter was signed by the following individuals:

- Joseph H. Hogarth, who became the first chairman of the Board
- Crosbie H. Lloyd, who acted as secretary for 7 years
- William Holden
- John S. Pattinson

Although the Charter was only signed in 1921, there had been meetings of British manufacturers and businessmen in Mexico beforehand, in the years leading up to the creation of the Chamber.

At the time of the Chamber's creation, British investment in Mexico was very high. In following years, this interest declined, but in more recent years, efforts to increase bilateral trade have met with success.

== Services ==
The British Chamber of Commerce in Mexico hosts its own events, helps organize and participates in external events, obtains discounts for its members, offers advice and facilitates networking for businesses in Mexico or companies interested in establishing themselves in Mexico.

== Business sector groups ==
Chamber members can join the Business Sector Groups, which represent certain industries in Mexico. They meet monthly to share advice and best practices as well as organise events related to their sector and write reports.
