= Godefroy, Haiti =

Godefroy
- Village
- Location in Haiti
- Coordinates: 18.2048819°N 73.8049595°W
- Country: Haiti
- Department: Sud
- Arrondissement: Les Cayes
- Elevation: 34 m (112 ft)

Godefroy (French pronunciation: [ɡɔdfʁwa]) is a village in the Les Cayes commune of the Les Cayes Arrondissement, in the Sud department of Haiti.
