= Frederick Walshe =

Brigadier-General Frederick Walshe CB CMG DSO
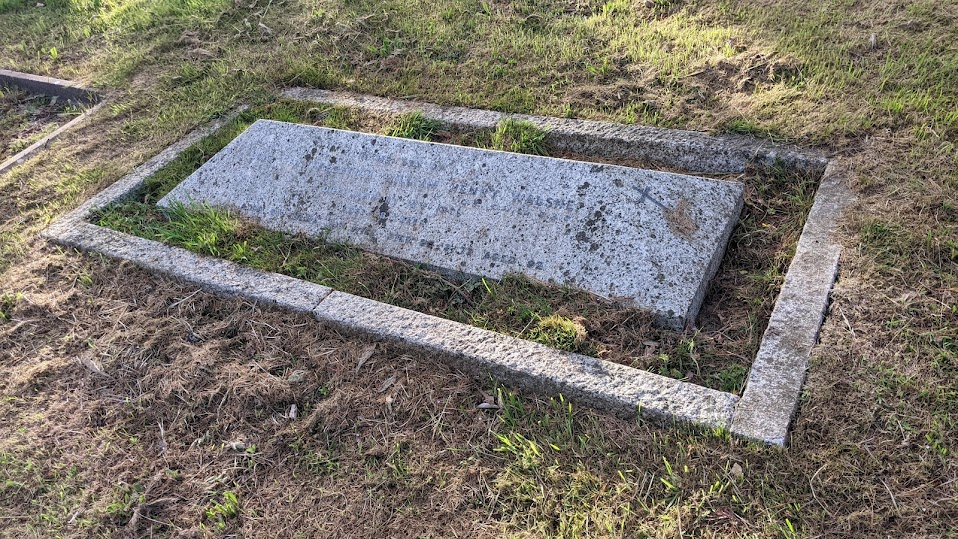
- Walshe's grave in Westham, Weymouth.
- Born: 26 July 1872
- Died: 15 January 1931 (aged 58); Weymouth, Dorset
- Military career
- Allegiance: United Kingdom
- Branch: British Army
- Service years: 1892–1928
- Rank: Brigadier-General
- Units: Royal Artillery, Royal Horse Artillery
- Conflicts: First World War; Russian Civil War
- Awards: CB, CMG, DSO

Brigadier-General Frederick William Henry Walshe CB CMG DSO (26 July 1872 – 15 January 1931) was a senior British Army officer during the First World War.

== Biography ==
Born on 26 July 1872, Frederick Walshe was educated at Bedford School and at Royal Military Academy, Woolwich. He received his first commission as a second lieutenant in the Royal Artillery in 1892, was promoted to the rank of lieutenant in the Royal Horse Artillery in 1897, to the rank of captain in 1899, and to the rank of major in 1909.

He served during the First World War, between 1914 and 1918, during the Gallipoli Campaign, in Egypt and in France. He was promoted on 3 June 1918 to brevet colonel.

He was promoted to the rank of brigadier general in 1919, serving with Lieutenant General Anton Deniken and General Pyotr Nikolayevich Wrangel during the Russian Civil War, between 1919 and 1920. He was Aide-de-camp to King George V, between 1920 and 1928, served in Turkey and Mesopotamia, in 1921, and in India, between 1924 and 1928.

Brigadier General Frederick Walshe was invested as a Companion of the Distinguished Service Order in 1917, as a Companion of the Order of St Michael and St George in 1919, and as a Companion of the Order of the Bath in 1928. He retired from the British Army in 1928 and died in Weymouth, Dorset, on 15 January 1931, aged 58.
