= Thomas Godfrey =

Thomas Godfrey may refer to:

- Thomas Godfrey (footballer) (1904–1983), Scottish footballer
- Thomas Godfrey (inventor) (1704–1749), inventor of an octant
- Thomas Godfrey (writer), poet and author of The Prince of Parthia, son of the inventor
- Thomas J. Godfrey, legislator in the U.S. state of Ohio
- Tommy Godfrey (1916–1984), English actor
- Thomas Godfrey (apothecary) (died 1721), inventor of Godfrey's Cordial
- Thomas Godfrey (MP for Hythe) (1751–1810), English MP
- Thomas Godfrey (MP for Winchelsea and New Romney) (1586–1664), English MP
