= Joffre T. Whisenton =

President of Southern University
- In office 1985–1989
- Preceded by: Jesse N. Stone
- Succeeded by: Dolores Richard Spikes

Personal details
- Education: University of Alabama

Joffre T. Whisenton is an American academic administrator. He was the first African-American student to earn a PhD from the University of Alabama. He served as the president of Southern University from 1985 to 1989.
