= Jocelyn Godefroi =

British translator

Jocelyn Godefroi MVO (1880 in Kensington – 30 March 1969) was a British translator.

Educated at Haileybury College and Trinity College, Oxford, he worked for the Lord Chamberlain's Office for over four decades. He translated several works of French literature into English, notably Gabriel Chevallier's comic novel Clochemerle and Julien Green's journals. All together he translated 18 works in 27 publications in 2 languages and 537 library holdings
