= Godfrey Webb =

British author

Godfrey Edward Charles Webb (30 June 1914 – October 2003) was a British author, and member of the Souls. He wrote under the names Norman England, and Charles Godfrey.

Webb was born in London in 1914, and educated at Poole Grammar School. He married Muriel Sybil Bath. He worked in the Civil Service for Ordnance Survey.
