= Geoffroy (surname) =

Origin
- Region of origin: France

Geoffroy is a surname. Notable persons with that surname include:

- Jean-Baptiste Geoffroy (1601–1675), French composer
- Jean-Nicolas Geoffroy (1633–1694), French harpsichordist and organist
- Étienne François Geoffroy (1672–1731), French apothecary and chemist
- Claude Joseph Geoffroy (1685–1752), French apothecary, chemist and botanist; younger brother of Étienne François Geoffroy
- Étienne Louis Geoffroy (1725–1810), French entomologist
- Claude François Geoffroy (1729–1753), French chemist, discoverer of bismuth
- Julien Louis Geoffroy (1743–1814), French literary critic
- Jean-Baptiste Lislet Geoffroy (1755–1836), French astronomer, botanist and cartographer
- Étienne Geoffroy Saint-Hilaire (1772–1844), French naturalist
- Isidore Geoffroy Saint-Hilaire (1805–1861), French zoologist, son of Étienne Geoffroy Saint-Hilaire
- Henri-Jules-Jean Geoffroy (1853-1924), French painter

== See also ==
- Geoffrey (given name)
- Jeffries
- Jeffers
