= Guðrøðr =

Guðrøðr is a masculine Old Norse personal name. The name is rendered in Old Irish and Middle Irish as Gofraid or Gofraidh (later Goraidh in Scottish Gaelic). Anglicised forms of the Old Norse name are Godred, Guthred, and Guthfrith. The name is also Latinised as Godredus.

== Persons with the name ==
Many of these are given in more than one spelling in various sources, and thus their article titles here are not consistent.

- Gudrød the Hunter (semi-legendary king in Vingulmark in south-east Norway, from 804 until 810)
- Gudrød Bjørnsson (ruled Vestfold until 968)
- Godred Crovan (d. 1095), King of Dublin and the Isles
- Guðrøðr Óláfsson (d. 1187), King of Dublin and the Isles
- Guðrøðr Rǫgnvaldsson (d. 1231), King in the Isles
- Gofraid mac Amlaíb meic Ragnaill (d. 1075), King of Dublin
- Gofraid mac Arailt (d. 989), King of the Isles
- Gofraid mac Sitriuc (d. 951), King of Dublin
- Gofraid mac Sitriuc (d. 1070), King of Dublin, father of Fingal mac Gofraid
- Gofraid ua Ímair (d. 934), King of Dublin and Northumbria
- Guðrøðr Magnússon (fl. 1275), son of Magnús Óláfsson, King of Mann and the Isles
- Guðröðr of Skåne, 7th-century Scanian king
- Guthred (d. 895), King of York

== Other ==
- Godred, the name of an engine on the Culdee Fell Railway in the stories of the Rev. W. Awdry
