= Jefferson =

Jefferson may refer to:

== People ==
- Jefferson (surname)
- Jefferson (given name)
- Thomas Jefferson (1743–1826), third president of the United States
- Jefferson (footballer), numerous footballers
- Jefferson, stage name of Geoff Turton (born 1944), British singer

== Places ==
=== United States ===
- Jefferson, Alabama
- Jefferson, Columbia County, Arkansas
- Jefferson, Jefferson County, Arkansas
- Jefferson, Colorado
- Jefferson, Camden County, Georgia
- Jefferson, Georgia, the county seat of Jackson County
- Jefferson, Indiana
- Jefferson, Iowa
- Jefferson, Kansas
- Jeffersontown, Kentucky, originally known as Jefferson
- Jefferson, Louisiana
- Jefferson, Maine
- Jefferson, Maryland
- Jefferson, Massachusetts, a village in the town of Holden
- Jefferson, Minnesota
- Jefferson, New Hampshire
- Jefferson, New York, a town
  - Jefferson (CDP), New York, main hamlet in the town
- Jefferson, North Carolina
- Jefferson, Ohio
- Jefferson, Oklahoma
- Jefferson, Oregon
- Jefferson, Greene County, Pennsylvania
- Jefferson, York County, Pennsylvania
- Jefferson Hills, Pennsylvania, a borough formerly known as Jefferson
- Jefferson, South Carolina
- Jefferson, South Dakota
- Jefferson, Texas
- Jefferson, West Virginia
- Jefferson, Wisconsin, a city in Jefferson County
- Jefferson, Green County, Wisconsin, a town
- Jefferson, Jefferson County, Wisconsin, a town
- Jefferson, Monroe County, Wisconsin, a town
- Jefferson, Vernon County, Wisconsin, a town
- Jefferson Prairie Settlement, a former Norwegian settlement in Rock County, Wisconsin
- Jefferson County (disambiguation)
- Jefferson Township (disambiguation)
- List of peaks named Mount Jefferson, a list of mountains named Jefferson
- Jefferson River, Montana, a tributary of the Missouri River
- Jefferson Barracks Military Post, originally named Jefferson Barracks, a former United States Army post near Lemay, Missouri
- Jefferson Territory, an unrecognized territory that existed from 1859 to 1861
- Jefferson (proposed Pacific state), proposed in 1941
- Jefferson (proposed Southern state), proposed in 1915

=== Canada ===
- Jefferson, Alberta, an unincorporated community

== Arts and entertainment ==
- The Jeffersons, a 1975–1985 American sitcom
- "The Jeffersons" (South Park), a 2004 episode of South Park
- Jefferson, Mississippi, a fictional town where many of William Faulkner's stories are set
- "Jefferson", a song from the album Room Service by Roxette

== Schools ==
- Jefferson College (disambiguation)
- Jefferson Community College (disambiguation)
- Jefferson Community and Technical College, a community college in Louisville, Kentucky
- Jefferson Community College (New York), Watertown, New York
- Jefferson, brand name of Thomas Jefferson University, Philadelphia, Pennsylvania
- Jefferson High School (disambiguation)
- Jefferson Middle School (disambiguation)

== Transportation in the United States ==
- Jefferson station (Jacksonville), Florida, a monorail station
- Jefferson Station (SEPTA), Philadelphia, Pennsylvania, a railway station
- Jefferson Lines, a bus company serving the Midwest and West

== Other uses ==
- Jefferson (elm cultivar), a type of tree
- Rochester Jeffersons, a former National Football League team
- Jefferson Hotel (Richmond, Virginia)
- Jefferson Ward or Jeffersons, a discount department store chain operated by Montgomery Ward until 1988
- USRC Jefferson, vessels of the United States Revenue Cutter Service

== See also ==
- Jefferson City (disambiguation)
- Jefferson Literary and Debating Society, a student society at the University of Virginia in the United States
- Jefferson Memorial, Washington, D.C.
- Jefferson method, or D'Hondt method, which are methods of producing proportional representation
- Jefferson Park (disambiguation)
- Jefferson Pools, near Warm Springs, Virginia
- Jefferson State (disambiguation)
- Jefferson Junction, Wisconsin, an unincorporated community
- Jeffersonville (disambiguation)
- Thomas Jefferson (disambiguation)
- Thomas Jefferson National Accelerator Facility, commonly called Jefferson Lab (JLAB)
- The Jefferson Series, a lecture series in New Albany, Ohio
