= List of state and territory name etymologies of the United States =

Map showing the source languages/language families of state names

The fifty U.S. states, the District of Columbia, the five inhabited U.S. territories, and the U.S. Minor Outlying Islands have taken their names from a wide variety of languages. The names of 24 states derive from indigenous languages of the Americas and one from Hawaiian. Of those that come from Native American languages, eight come from Algonquian languages, seven from Siouan languages (one of those via Miami-Illinois, which is an Algonquian language), three from Iroquoian languages, two from Muskogean languages, one from a Caddoan language, one from an Eskimo-Aleut language, one from a Uto-Aztecan language, and one from either an Athabaskan language or a Uto-Aztecan language.

Twenty other state names derive from European languages: seven come from Latin (mostly from Latinized forms of English personal names, one of those coming from Welsh), five from English, five from Spanish, and three from French (one of those via English). The source language/language family of the remaining five states is disputed or unclear: Arizona, Idaho, Maine, Oregon, and Rhode Island.

Of the fifty states, eleven are named after an individual person. Six of those are named in honor of European monarchs: the two Carolinas, the two Virginias, Georgia, and Louisiana. In addition, Maryland is named after Queen Henrietta Maria, queen consort of King Charles I of England, and New York after the then-Duke of York, who later became King James II of England. Over the years, several attempts have been made to name a state after one of the Founding Fathers or other great statesmen of U.S. history: the State of Franklin, the State of Jefferson (three separate attempts), the State of Lincoln (two separate attempts), and the State of Washington; in the end, only Washington materialized (Washington Territory was carved out of the Oregon Territory and renamed Washington in order to avoid confusion with the District of Columbia, which contains the city of Washington).

Several of the states that derive their names from names used for Native peoples have retained the plural ending in "s": Arkansas, Illinois, Kansas, Massachusetts, and Texas. One common naming pattern has been as follows:

Native tribal group → River → Territory → State

== State names ==
State name	Date first attested in original language	Language of origin	Word(s) in original language	Meaning and notes
Alabama	April 19, 1692	Choctaw/Alabama	alba amo/Albaamaha	'Thicket-clearers' or 'plant-cutters', from alba, '(medicinal) plants', and amo, 'to clear'. The modern Choctaw name for the tribe is Albaamu.
Alaska	December 2, 1666	Aleut via Russian	alaxsxaq via Аляска (Alyaska)	'Mainland' (literally 'the object towards which the action of the sea is directed').
Arizona	February 1, 1883	Basque	aritz ona	'The good oak'.
Arizona	February 1, 1883	Oʼodham via Spanish	ali ṣona-g via Arizonac	'Having a little spring'.
Arkansas	July 20, 1796	Kansa, Quapaw via Miami-Illinois and French	akakaze via Arcansas	Borrowed from a French spelling of a Miami-Illinois rendering of the tribal name kką:ze (see Kansas, below), which the Miami and Illinois used to refer to the Quapaw.
California	May 22, 1850	Spanish	california	Probably named for the fictional Island of California ruled by Queen Calafia in the 16th-century novel Las sergas de Esplandián by Garci Rodríguez de Montalvo. See also: Etymology of California
Colorado	1743	Spanish	colorado	'Ruddy' or 'red', originally referring to the Colorado River.
Connecticut	April 15, 1696	Eastern Algonquian, Mohegan-Pequot	quinnitukqut	From some Eastern Algonquian language of southern New England (perhaps Mahican), meaning 'at the long tidal river', after the Connecticut River. The name reflects Proto-Eastern-Algonquian *kwən-, 'long'; *-əhtəkw, 'tidal river'; and *-ənk, the locative suffix).
Delaware	January 31, 1680	French via English	de la Warr	After the Delaware River, which was named for Lord de la Warr (originally probably Norman French de la guerre or de la werre, 'of the war'). Lord de la Warr was the first governor-general of the Colony of Virginia.
Florida	April 2, 1513	Spanish	(pascua) florida	'Flowery (Easter)' (to distinguish it from Christmastide, which was also called Pascua), in honor of its discovery by the Spanish during the Easter season.
(Georgia (U.S. state)) Georgia	October 3, 1674	Latin via English (ultimately from Greek)	Georgius	The feminine Latin form of "George", named after King George II of Great Britain. It was also a reference to Saint George, who is also the supposed namesake of the Eurasian country also called Georgia, whose name was derived from the Greek word georgos, meaning 'husbandman' or 'farmer', from ge 'earth' + ergon 'work'.
Hawaii	December 29, 1879	Hawaiian	Hawaiʻi	Either from Hawaiki, legendary homeland of the Polynesians (Hawaiki is believed to mean 'place of the gods'), or named for Hawaiʻiloa, legendary discoverer of the Hawaiian Islands.
Idaho	June 6, 1864	Germanic	Idaho	Probably made up by George M. "Doc" Willing as a practical joke; originally claimed to have been derived from a word in a Native American language that meant 'Gem of the Mountains'. The name was initially proposed for the Territory of Colorado until its origins were discovered. Years later it fell into common usage, and was proposed for the Territory of Idaho instead.
Idaho	June 6, 1864	Plains Apache	ídaahę́	Possibly from the Plains Apache word for 'enemy' (ídaahę́), which was used to refer to the Comanches.
Illinois	March 24, 1793	Algonquian, Miami-Illinois via French	ilenweewa	The state is named for the French adaptation of an Algonquian language (perhaps Miami-Illinois) word apparently meaning 'speaks normally' (cf. Miami-Illinois ilenweewa, Ojibwe <ilinoüek>, Proto-Algonquian *elen-, 'ordinary', and -we·, 'to speak'), referring to the Illiniwek (Illinois).
Indiana	December 2, 1794	Latin (ultimately from Proto-Indo-Iranian)	indiāna	'Land of the Indians'. The names "Indians" and "India" come, via Latin, Greek, Old Persian and Sanskrit, from Proto-Indo-Iranian *sindhu-, which originally referred to the Indus River.
Iowa	August 31, 1818	Dakota, Chiwere via French	ayúxba/ayuxwe via Aiouez	Via French Aiouez, and named after the Iowa tribe. This demonym has no further known etymology, though some give it the meaning 'sleepy ones'.
Kansas	May 12, 1832	Kansa via French	kką:ze via Cansez	Named after the Kansas River, which in turn was named after the Kaw or Kansas tribe. The name seems to be connected to the idea of "wind".
Kentucky	April 28, 1728	Iroquoian	(see Meaning and notes)	Originally referring to the Kentucky River. While some sources say the etymology is uncertain, most agree on a meaning of '(on) the meadow' or '(on) the prairie' (cf. Mohawk kenhtà:ke, Seneca gëdá’geh (phonemic /kẽtaʔkeh/), 'at the field').
Louisiana	July 18, 1787	French (ultimately from Frankish)	Louisiane	After King Louis XIV of France. The name Louis itself comes from Frankish hluda, 'heard of, famous' (cf. loud) + wiga, 'war'.
Maine	October 13, 1729	English	main	A common historical etymology is that the name refers to the mainland, as opposed to the coastal islands.
Maine	October 13, 1729	French	Maine	After the French province of Maine.
Maine	October 13, 1729	English	(Broad)mayne	A more recent proposal is that the state was named after the English village of Broadmayne, which was the family estate of Sir Ferdinando Gorges, the colony's founder.
Maryland	January 18, 1691	English (ultimately from Hebrew)	Mary	After Queen Henrietta Maria, wife of King Charles I of England. The name Mary originally meant 'bitterness' or 'rebelliousness' in Hebrew, and could also have come from the Egyptian word for 'beloved' or 'love'.
Massachusetts	June 4, 1665	Eastern Algonquian, Massachusett	muhsachuweesut	Plural of muswachusut, meaning 'near the great little-mountain' or 'at the great hill', which is usually identified as Great Blue Hill on the border of Milton and Canton, Massachusetts (cf. the Narragansett name Massachusêuck).
Michigan	October 28, 1811	Ojibwe via French	ᒥᔑᑲᒥ (mishigami)	'Large water' or 'large lake' (in Old Algonquin, *meshi-gami).
Minnesota	April 21, 1821	Dakota	mní sóta	'Cloudy water', referring to the Minnesota River.
Mississippi	March 9, 1800	Ojibwe via French	ᒥᓯᓰᐱ (misi-ziibi)	'Great river', after the Mississippi River.
Missouri	September 7, 1805	Miami-Illinois via French	wimihsoorita	'Dugout canoe'. The Missouri tribe was noteworthy among the Illinois for their dugout canoes, and so was referred to as the wimihsoorita, 'one who has a wood boat [dugout canoe]'.
Montana	November 1, 1860	Spanish	montaña	'Mountain'.
Nebraska	June 22, 1847	Chiwere via French	ñįbraske	'Flattened water', after the Platte River, which used to be known as the Nebraska River. Due to the flatness of the plains, flooding of the river would inundate the region with a flat expanse of water.
Nevada	February 9, 1845	Spanish	nevada	'Snow-covered', after the Sierra Nevada ('snow-covered mountains').
New Hampshire	August 27, 1692	English (ultimately from Old English)	Hampshire	After the county of Hampshire in England, whose name is derived from the original name for its largest city, Southampton, that being Hamtun, which is an Old English word that roughly translates to 'Village-Town'.
New Jersey	April 2, 1669	English (ultimately from Old Norse)	Jersey	After Jersey, the largest of the British Channel Islands and the birthplace of one of the colony's two co-founders, Sir George Carteret. The Latin name Caesarea was also applied to the colony of New Jersey as Nova Caesarea, because the Roman name of the island was thought to have been Caesarea. The name "Jersey" most likely comes from the Norse name Geirrsey, meaning 'Geirr's Island'.
New Mexico	November 1, 1859	Nahuatl via Spanish	Mēxihco via Nuevo México	From Spanish Nuevo México. The name Mexico comes from Nahuatl Mēxihca (pronounced [meːˈʃiʔko]), which referred to the Aztec people who founded the city of Tenochtitlan. Its literal meaning is unknown, though many possibilities have been proposed, such as that the name comes from the god Metztli.
(New York (state)) New York	October 15, 1680	English	York	After the Duke of York (later King James II of England). Named by King Charles II of England, James II's brother. The name "York" is derived from its Latin name Eboracum (via Old English Eoforwic and then Old Norse Jórvík), apparently borrowed from Brythonic Celtic *eborakon, which probably meant 'Yew-Tree Estate'. See also: York § Origin of the name
North Carolina	June 30, 1686	Latin via English (ultimately from Frankish)	Carolus via Carolana	After King Charles I of England and his son, King Charles II of England. The name Charles itself is derived from Frankish karl, 'man, husband'.
North Dakota	November 2, 1867	Sioux/Dakota	dakhóta	'Ally' or 'friend', after the Dakota tribe.
Ohio	April 19, 1785	Seneca via French	ohi:yo’	'Large creek', originally the name of both the Ohio River and Allegheny River. Often incorrectly translated as 'beautiful river', due to a French mistranslation.
Oklahoma	September 5, 1842	Choctaw	okla + homa	Devised as a rough translation of 'Indian Territory'. In Choctaw, okla means 'people', 'tribe', or 'nation', and homa- means 'red', thus 'red people'.
Oregon	1765	Unknown	Disputed	Disputed meaning. First named by Major Robert Rogers in a petition to King George III. Further information: Etymology of Oregon
Pennsylvania	March 8, 1650	Welsh and Latin	Penn + silvania	'Penn's woods', after Admiral William Penn, the father of its founder William Penn. Pennsylvania is the only state that shares part of its name with its founder. The name "Penn" comes from the Welsh word for 'head'.
Rhode Island	February 3, 1680	Dutch	roodt eylandt	'Red island', referring to Aquidneck Island. The Modern Dutch form of the phrase is 'rood eiland'.
Rhode Island	February 3, 1680	Greek	Ρόδος (Ródos)	For a resemblance to the island of Rhodes in the Aegean Sea.
South Carolina	November 12, 1687	Latin via English (ultimately from Frankish)	Carolus via Carolana	After King Charles I of England and his son, King Charles II of England. The name Charles itself is derived from Frankish karl, 'man, husband'.
South Dakota	November 2, 1867	Sioux/Dakota	dakhóta	'Ally' or 'friend', after the Dakota tribe.
Tennessee	May 24, 1747	Cherokee	ᏔᎾᏏ (tanasi)	Tanasi (in Cherokee: ᏔᎾᏏ) was the name of a Cherokee village; the meaning is unknown.
Texas	June 30, 1827	Caddo via Spanish	táyshaʔ via Tejas	'Friend', used by the Caddo to refer the larger Caddo nation (in opposition to enemy tribes). The name was borrowed into Spanish as texa, plural texas, and was used to refer to the Nabedache people (and later to the Caddo Nation in general). When the Spanish decided to convert the Nabedache to Catholicism, they constructed La Misión de San Francisco de los Texas, which later came to be used in naming the Viceroyalty of New Spain’s province.
Utah	December 20, 1877	Apache via Spanish	yúdah via yuta	From the Spanish designation for the Ute people, yuta, in turn perhaps a borrowing from Western Apache yúdah, meaning 'high', sometimes incorrectly translated as 'people of the mountains'.
Utah	December 20, 1877	Ute via Spanish	noochee via yuta	From the Ute's self-designation [nutʃi̥], plural [nuːtʃiu], as suggested by J. P. Harrington, though this etymology is disputed.
Vermont	September 27, 1721	French	vert + mont	'Green mount' or 'green mountain'; vert in French means 'green', and mont means 'mount' or 'mountain'. However, in Standard French, south from the Joret Line, 'green mountain' would actually be written mont vert.
Virginia	1584	Latin	Virginia	'Country of the Virgin', after Elizabeth I of England, who was known as the "Virgin Queen" because she never married.
(Washington (state)) Washington	February 22, 1872	English	Washington	After George Washington, whose surname was in turn derived from the town of Washington in historic County Durham, England. The etymology of the town's name is disputed, but agreed to be ultimately Old English.
West Virginia	September 1, 1831	Latin	Virginia	The western, transmontane counties of Virginia, which separated from Virginia during the American Civil War. See Virginia, above.
Wisconsin	February 5, 1822	Miami-Illinois via French	Meeskohsinki via Ouisconsin(k)	Originally spelled Mescousing by the French, and later corrupted to Ouisconsin. It likely derives from a Miami-Illinois word Meskonsing, meaning 'it lies red' or 'river running through a red place'. It may also come from the Ojibwe term miskwasiniing, 'red-stone place'.
Wyoming	August 14, 1877	Munsee/Delaware	xwé:wamənk	'At the big river flat'; the name was transplanted westward from the Wyoming Valley in Pennsylvania.

== Territory and federal district names ==
Territory or federal district name	Year first attested in original language	Language of origin	Word(s) in original language	Meaning and notes
American Samoa	1911 (Note: This is the date that the name "American Samoa" was officially adopted. It had been used unofficially since about 1904. It is unclear when the word "Samoa" first started being used.) (July 17)	English and Samoan	American + Sāmoa	The CIA World Factbook says "The name Samoa is composed of two parts, 'sa', meaning sacred, and 'moa', meaning center, so the name can mean Holy Center; alternately, it can mean 'place of the sacred moa bird' of Polynesian mythology." "American" is ultimately derived from Amerigo Vespucci. The name "American Samoa" first started being used by the U.S. Navy around 1904, and "American Samoa" was made official in 1911.
District of Columbia	1738	Neo-Latin	Columbia	Named for Columbia, the national personification of the United States, which is itself named for Christopher Columbus.
Guam	1898 (Note: This is the date for the origin of the name "Guam", not "Guåhån". There is no information about when "Guåhån" first started being used.) (December 10)	Chamorro	Guåhan	'What we have', from Guåhån in Chamorro language. The name "Guam" was first used in the Treaty of Paris (1898).
Northern Mariana Islands	1667 (Note: 1667 is the date the Mariana Islands were named; the name "Northern Mariana Islands" appears to have been first used when its constitution was created on January 9, 1978. Previously it was called the "Mariana Islands District" (within the TTPI).)	Spanish	Islas Marianas	Mariana Islands chain named by Spain for Mariana of Austria.
Puerto Rico	1493	Spanish	puerto rico	"Rich port". The CIA World Factbook says "Christopher Columbus named the island San Juan Bautista (Saint John the Baptist) and the capital city and main port Ciudad de Puerto Rico (Rich Port City); over time, however, the names were shortened and transposed and the island came to be called Puerto Rico and its capital San Juan."
U.S. Virgin Islands	1493	Spanish	Islas Vírgenes	Named by Christopher Columbus for Saint Ursula and her 11,000 virgins. The name "Virgin Islands of the United States" (U.S. Virgin Islands) was adopted in 1917 when the islands were purchased by the U.S. from Denmark. (Note: Some of the Virgin Islands became, and still are, a separate political area — the British Virgin Islands.)
United States Minor Outlying Islands	Various	Various	Various	The name "United States Minor Outlying Islands" started to be used in 1986. Previously, some of the islands were included in a group called "United States Miscellaneous Pacific Islands".: Baker Island was named for Michael Baker in 1832.; Howland Island was named after a whaling vessel in 1842.; Jarvis Island was named after three people named "Jarvis" in 1821 (when they discovered the island).; Johnston Atoll was named for Captain Charles Johnston in 1807.; Kingman Reef was named for Captain W. E. Kingman in 1853.; Midway Atoll was named in the 19th century for its location being approximately halfway between North America and Asia.; The CIA World Factbook says this about Navassa Island: "The flat island was named 'Navaza' by some of Christopher Columbus' sailors in 1504; the name derives from the Spanish term "nava" meaning 'flat land, plain, or field'".; Palmyra Atoll was named in 1802 when the USS Palmyra shipwrecked there.; Wake Island was named after Samuel Wake, a British captain, in 1796. A different captain, William Wake, discovered the island in 1792.

== See also ==
- List of Canadian provincial and territorial name etymologies
- List of places in the United States named after royalty
- Lists of U.S. county name etymologies
- Toponymy

== Bibliography ==
- Bright, William (2004). Native American Placenames of the United States. Norman: University of Oklahoma Press.
- Guyton, Kathy (2009). U.S. State Names: The Stories of How Our States Were Named Nederland, Colorado: Mountain Storm Press.
