= Jefferson (given name) =

Jefferson or Jéferson is a given name. Notable people with the name include:

== Footballers ==
- Gauchinho (footballer, born 1983), full name Jéferson Lima de Menezes, Brazilian midfielder
- Jeferson Paulo Rodrigues de Souza (born 1981), Togolese footballer
- Jéferson (footballer, born 1984), full name Jéferson Rodrigues Gonçalves, Brazilian midfielder
- Jéferson (footballer, born 1986), full name Jéferson Gomes do Nascimento, Brazilian goalkeeper
- Jefferson (footballer, born 1970), full name Jefferson Tomaz de Souza, Brazilian midfielder
- Jefferson (footballer, born 1982), full name Jefferson Charles de Souza Pinto, Brazilian midfielder
- Jefferson (footballer, born 1983), full name Jefferson de Oliveira Galvão, Brazilian goalkeeper
- Jefferson (footballer, born January 1988), full name Jefferson Andrade Siqueira, Brazilian forward
- Jefferson (footballer, born July 1988), full name Jefferson Moreira Nascimento, Brazilian defender
- Jefferson (footballer, born August 1988), full name Jefferson Lopes Faustino, Brazilian defender
- Jefferson (footballer, born January 1989), full name Jefferson de Souza Leite, Brazilian midfielder
- Jefferson (footballer, born 1997), full name Jefferson Junio Antonio da Silva, Brazilian defender
- Jefferson Alphonse (born 2003), Canadian soccer player
- Jefferson Batista (born 1976), Brazilian footballer
- Jefferson Farfán (born 1984), Peruvian midfielder
- Jefferson Feijão (born 1978), full name Jefferson Marques da Conceição, Brazilian forward
- Jefferson Montero (born 1989), Ecuadorian midfielder
- Jefferson Nascimento (born 1988), Brazilian defender

== Others ==
- Jefferson Byrd, American politician
- Jefferson Alves de Campos (born 1964), Brazilian politician
- Jefferson Davis (1808–1889), President of the Confederate States of America
- Jefferson Davis (1862–1913), American state governor and US Senator
- Jefferson Johnson, American musical director and conductor
- Jefferson Morley, American journalist and historian
- Jeferson Quero, Venezuelan baseball player
- Jefferson Beauregard Sessions III, 84th United States Attorney General
- Jefferson Shields (1829–1918), American slave
- Jefferson Stafford, American politician
- Jefferson Utanes (1979–2025), Filipino voice actor
- Jefferson Vargas, Colombian cyclist
- Jefferson Wood, American illustrator
- J. Jefferson Webster, American politician, businessman, and farmer
- J. Jefferson Webster III, American checkers player

== Fictional characters ==
- Jefferson D'Arcy, in the television show Married... with Children

== See also ==
- Jefferson (surname)
- Jeffrey, the origin of the surname Jefferson
- Yeferson
