= JCC =

JCC may refer to:

== People ==
- John C. Calhoun (1782–1850), American vice president under John Quincy Adams and Andrew Jackson
- John Cooper Clarke (born 1949), English performance poet
- Jimmy Chamberlin Complex, a Jazz-Fusion band formed by former Smashing Pumpkins drummer Jimmy Chamberlin
- Julio César Chávez (born 1962), Mexican boxer
- Julio César Chávez Jr. (born 1986), son of the 1962 born Mexican boxer
- John Calvin Coolidge Jr., the 30th president of the United States

== Places ==
- Jaffari Community Centre
- Jakarta Convention Center
- Jamestown Community College
- Jefferson Community College (disambiguation), various places
- Jewish Community Centre for London
- Jhenidah Cadet College
- John C. Campbell Folk School
- John Charles Centre for Sport, Leeds, England
- Johnston Community College, Smithfield, North Carolina
- Jackson College, formerly known as Jackson Community College
- JCC (Jaeneung Culture Center), Seoul, South Korea
- China Basin Heliport, IATA code JCC, dismantled when the SFPD Aero Division was disbanded

== Organisations ==
- Jewish Community Center
- Jewish Claims Conference, formally The Conference on Jewish Material Claims Against Germany
- JC International Airlines (ICAO code: JCC)

== Programming ==
- Java Call Control, in reference to Java Programming
- Jcc, standard notation for any x86 conditional jump
- JCC Driver, a JDBC driver for IBM's DB2 Universal Database

== Other uses ==
- Carthage Film Festival, an annual film festival held in Tunis, Tunisia (from Journées cinématographiques de Carthage)
- Jane Coffin Childs Memorial Fund for Medical Research
- Japanese Crude Cocktail, basket of crude oils used as a basis for gas-pricing
- JCC, al Jazeera Children's Channel, former name of Jeem TV
- Jedi Council Community
- Job Corps Center
- Joint Control Commission
- Joseph Chamberlain College, College in Birmingham, England
- Journal of Computational Chemistry, an academic journal
- Journal of Corporate Citizenship, an academic journal published by Greenleaf Publishing
- Jubilee Comedy Circus, a comedy show that aired on Sony TV
- Junior Car Club, an early name for the British Automobile Racing Club

== See also ==
- JJCC, a South Korean hip-hop boy group
- JJC (disambiguation)
- JC (disambiguation)
