= Jefferson Souza =

Jefferson Souza may refer to:

- Jefferson Souza (water polo) (1908-1992), Brazilian water polo player
- Jefferson de Souza (born 1995), Norwegian football forward

== See also ==
- Jefferson (footballer, born 1970), Jefferson Tomaz de Souza, Brazilian football midfielder
