= Jefferson, Illinois =

Jefferson, Illinois may refer to:

- Jefferson County, Illinois
- Jefferson Park, Chicago, a neighborhood of Chicago
  - Jefferson Township, Cook County, Illinois, a defunct township that became Jefferson Park
- Jefferson, the reported site of an 1855 tornado; now found to be Des Plaines, Illinois
- Jeffersonville, Illinois

== See also ==
- Jefferson
