= David Jefferson =

David Jefferson may refer to:

- David Jefferson, wrestler in The Mod Squad

== See also ==
- Jefferson (surname)
- David Jeaffreson (1931–2008), civil servant
