= Ulmus americana 'Washington' =

Elm cultivar

- Species: Ulmus americana
- Cultivar: 'Washington'
- Origin: US

The American elm cultivar Ulmus americana 'Washington', of unknown derivation, was sourced from Princeton Nurseries, Princeton, New Jersey, from 1985, and planted on the National Mall, Washington D.C. It was then selected by H. V. Wester of the U. S. National Park Service and introduced for trials as NPS 3-178. Santamour pointed out that as the historic Washington Elm had been propagated as 'Washington', NPS 3-178, if ever registered as a cultivar, would need a different cultivar name.

== Description ==
The tree has been described as possibly having triploid chromosome levels (unusual for an American elm), suggesting it may be a hybrid between the tetraploid and rarer diploid forms of American elm, like the cultivar 'Jefferson'.

== Pests and diseases ==
The tree is resistant to Dutch elm disease, but less so than other contemporaneous American elm cultivars such as 'Valley Forge'. Like all other American elm cultivars, it is also susceptible to elm yellows. No other specific information available, but the species generally is also moderately preferred for feeding and reproduction by the adult elm leaf beetle Xanthogaleruca luteola, and highly preferred for feeding by the Japanese beetle Popillia japonica in the United States. U. americana is the most susceptible of all the elms to verticillium wilt.

== Cultivation ==
Neither 'Washington' nor 'Jefferson' has been widely tested beyond Washington D.C. The tree is not known to be in commerce, nor known to be in cultivation beyond the United States.

== Accessions ==
=== North America ===
- Brooklyn Botanic Garden, New York, US. Acc. no. 850233.
- Smith College, US. Acc. no. 41703.
