= Jeffco =

Jeffco or JeffCo may refer to:

- Jefferson County, Colorado
- Jeffco Airport, Colorado, former name of Rocky Mountain Metropolitan Airport
- Jefferson County, Missouri transit (JeffCo Express)
- Jefferson College (disambiguation), multiple schools
