= Charlie Newman (baseball) =

American baseball player (1868–1947)

- Outfielder
- Born: November 5, 1868; Juda, Wisconsin, U.S.
- Died: November 23, 1947 (aged 79); San Diego, California, U.S.
- Batted: Right Threw: Right

MLB debut
- July 11, 1892, for the New York Giants

Last MLB appearance
- October 15, 1892, for the Chicago Colts

MLB statistics
- Games played: 19
- At bats: 73
- Hits: 14
- Stats at Baseball Reference

Teams
- New York Giants (1892); Chicago Colts (1892)

Charles Frank Newman (November 5, 1868 – November 23, 1947) was an American Major League Baseball outfielder.

== Biography ==
Newman was born in Juda, Wisconsin. He married Fannie Tilley in 1890, was widowed in 1936, and then married Mary Martin in 1939. Newman played professional baseball in the 1890s. He then served as chief of police in Janesville, Wisconsin from 1921 to 1937. He moved to California in 1938 and died in San Diego. He was buried in Albany, Wisconsin.
