= Elmer J. Burr =

United States Army Medal of Honor recipient (1908–1942)

- Born: May 11, 1908; Neenah, Wisconsin, US
- Died: December 25, 1942 (aged 34); Buna, Territory of Papua
- Military career
- Allegiance: United States
- Branch: United States Army
- Service years: 1928 - 1942
- Rank: First Sergeant
- Units: 127th Infantry Regiment, 32nd Infantry Division
- Conflicts: World War II: Battle of Buna-Gona †
- Awards: Medal of Honor

Elmer J. Burr (May 11, 1908 – December 25, 1942) was a United States Army soldier and a recipient of the United States military's highest decoration—the Medal of Honor—for his actions in World War II.

== Biography ==
Burr was born on May 11, 1908, in Neenah, Wisconsin. He joined the Wisconsin Army National Guard in about 1928 and served with the 32nd Infantry Division. After the 32nd Division was federalized in 1940, he participated in training exercises with his unit until late 1941, when he was discharged for being over the 28-year age limit. However, the attack on Pearl Harbor on December 7, 1941, led to Burr re-enlisting from Menasha, Wisconsin, and rejoining the 32nd Division.

After a few months of training in Australia, he was sent to New Guinea. By December 24, 1942, he was serving as a First Sergeant in Company I of the 127th Infantry Regiment at the village of Buna. On that day, he smothered the blast of an enemy-thrown hand grenade with his body, sacrificing himself to protect those around him. He suffered severe wounds to his abdomen and died in a field hospital the next day. For this action, he was posthumously awarded the Medal of Honor ten months later, on October 11, 1943.

== Medal of Honor citation ==
First Sergeant Burr's official Medal of Honor citation reads:

For conspicuous gallantry and intrepidity in action above and beyond the call of duty. During an attack near Buna, New Guinea, on 24 December 1942, 1st Sgt. Burr saw an enemy grenade strike near his company commander. Instantly and with heroic self-sacrifice he threw himself upon it, smothering the explosion with his body. 1st Sgt. Burr thus gave his life in saving that of his commander.

== See also ==
- List of Medal of Honor recipients for World War II
