= USRC Jefferson =

USRC Jeferson is the name of the following vessels of the United States Revenue Cutter Service:

- USRC Jefferson (1802)
- USRC Jefferson (1833)
- USRC Jefferson (1845)

== See also ==
- Jefferson (disambiguation)
- USRC Jefferson Davis
