= Springville, Vernon County, Wisconsin =

Springville, Wisconsin
- Unincorporated community
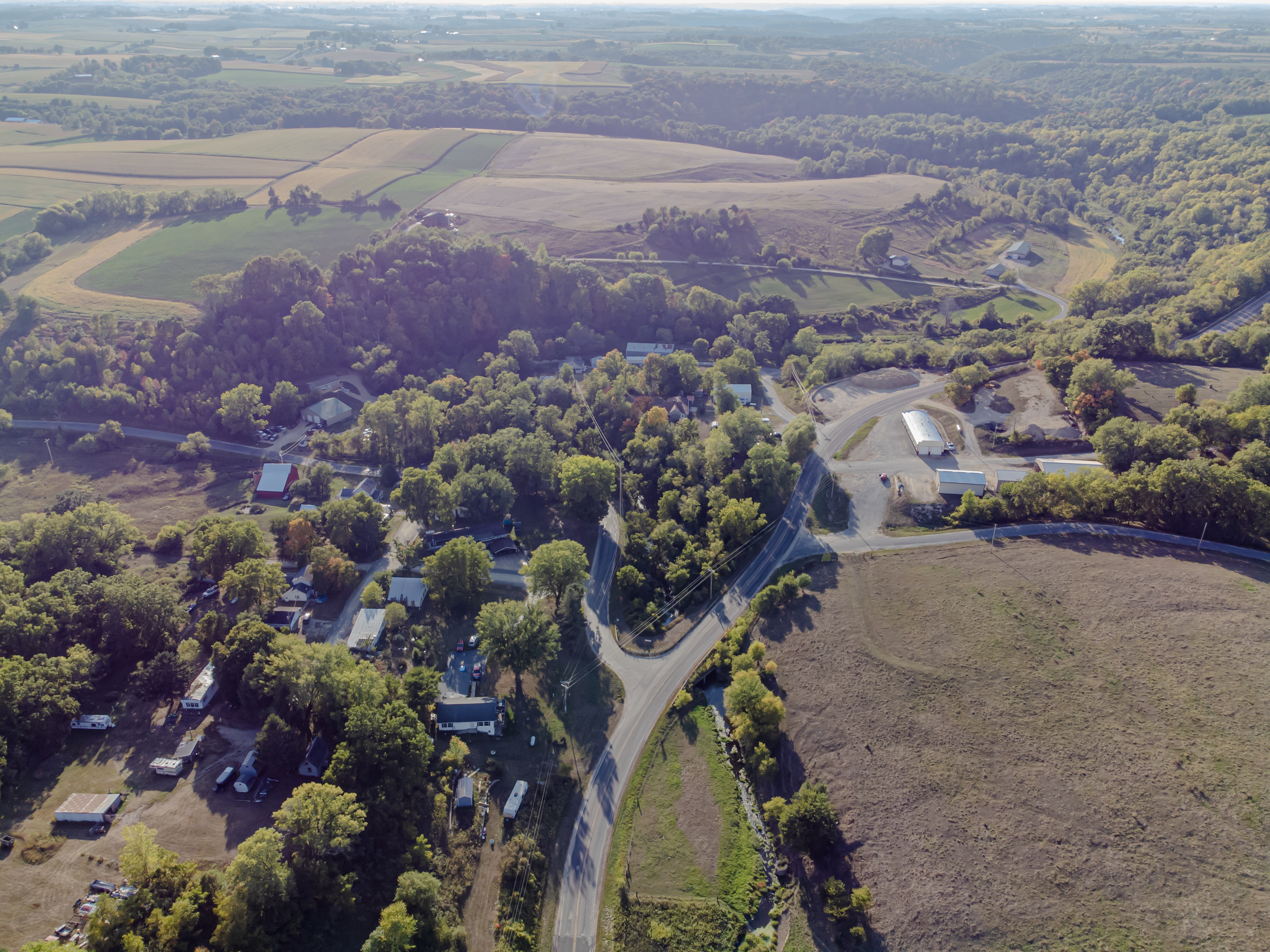

- Location within Wisconsin Location within the United States
- Coordinates: 43°35′01″N 90°56′23″W
- Country: United States
- State: Wisconsin
- County: Vernon
- Elevation: 1,093 ft (333 m)

Population (2020)
  - Total: 1,314
  - Density: 28/sq mi (11/km^{2})
- Time zone: UTC-6 (Central (CST))
  - Summer (DST): UTC-5 (CDT)
- Area code: 608
- GNIS feature ID: 1574726

Springville is an unincorporated community in the town of Jefferson, Vernon County, Wisconsin, United States. As of 2010, its population was 1,318, however, as of 2020, it had dropped slightly, to 1,314.
