= Juda, Wisconsin =

Census-designated place in Wisconsin, United States

- Census-designated place
- Location in Green County and the state of Wisconsin

- Location within Wisconsin Location within the United States
- Coordinates: 42°35′23″N 89°30′21″W
- Country: United States
- State: Wisconsin
- County: Green
- Town: Jefferson

Area
  - Total: 0.267 sq mi (0.69 km^{2})
  - Land: 0.267 sq mi (0.69 km^{2})
  - Water: 0 sq mi (0 km^{2})
- Elevation: 846 ft (258 m)

Population (2020)
  - Total: 340
  - Density: 1,300/sq mi (490/km^{2})
- Time zone: UTC-6 (Central (CST))
  - Summer (DST): UTC-5 (CDT)
- Area code: 608
- FIPS code
- GNIS feature ID: 1577668

Juda is an unincorporated census-designated place located in the town of Jefferson, in Green County, Wisconsin, United States. Juda is five miles east of Monroe along state highways 11 and 81. As of the 2020 census, its population was 340, down from 357 at the 2010 census. Juda is a part of the Madison Metropolitan Statistical Area.

On March 30, 1967, nine students from Juda's Union High School, all girls, were killed when a Delta Air Lines DC-8 jet crashed into the motel where they had been staying during a senior class trip to New Orleans, Louisiana.

== Education ==
- The Juda School District is located in Juda.

== Notable people ==
- Charle Newman, baseball player
- Gabriel Zophy, Wisconsin politician
