= State of Lincoln =

In the United States, there have been two separate proposals to create a state with the name Lincoln:

- Lincoln (proposed Southern state), in Texas
- Lincoln (proposed Northwestern state), in Idaho and Washington

== See also ==
- State of Jefferson (disambiguation)
- List of U.S. state partition proposals
- Linconia
