= 127th Infantry Regiment (United States) =

- 127th Infantry Regiment coat of arms
- Active: 25 April 1884 to Present
- Country: United States
- Allegiance: Wisconsin
- Branch: United States Army
- Size: Regiment
- Nickname: First Wisconsin (Special Designation)
- Motto: LES TERRIBLES

Commanders
- Notable commanders: Russell C. Langdon

Insignia
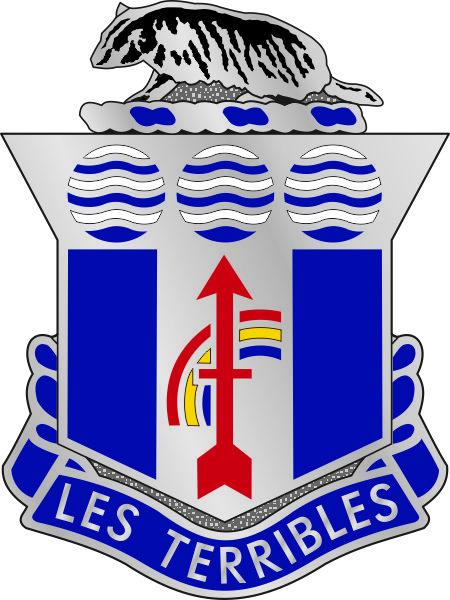
- Distinctive Unit Insignia

The 2nd Battalion, 127th Infantry Regiment traces its origins to the 4th Infantry Battalion, Wisconsin National Guard.

== Organization ==
The 4th Infantry Battalion, Wisconsin National Guard, was organized on 25 April 1884, from Milwaukee companies, expanded and redesignated in 1890 as the 4th Infantry Regiment (four companies transferred to 1st Infantry Regiment 28 April 1898).

The four regiments of the Wisconsin Volunteer Infantry in federal service for the War with Spain were as follows:

- 1st Infantry mustered in 14 May 1898, at Milwaukee; mustered out 19 October 1898;
- 2nd Infantry Regiment mustered on 12 May 1898, at Madison; mustered out 11–21 November 1898;
- 3rd Infantry Regiment mustered on 11 May 1898, at Milwaukee; mustered out 4–17 January 1899; and
- 4th Infantry Regiment was reorganized with the addition of new companies and mustered on 11 July 1898; mustered out 28 February 1899 at Anniston Texas.

They were reorganized on 10 June 1899, as 1st, 2nd, and 3rd Infantry Regiments in the Wisconsin National Guard.

=== Mexico Border War ===
The 1st, 2nd, 3rd Infantry Regiments were mustered into federal service on 30 June 1916, for service on the Mexican Border Service and mustered out at Fort Sheridan, Illinois, on 19 January 1917, (1st Battalion), 28 February 1917, (2nd Battalion), and 14 December 1916 (3rd Battalion).

=== World War I ===
The regiments were again called into federal service for World War I on 15 July 1917, and drafted into federal service on 5 August 1917. They were reorganized and redesignated as the 128th and 127th Infantry on 24 September 1917 at Camp MacArthur, Texas, and assigned to the 32nd Division.

The units were disbanded at Camp Grant, Illinois, on 18 May 1919, (127th) and 19 May 1919 (128th). The 32d Division demobilized on 23 May 1919, at Camp Custer, Michigan.

=== Interwar period ===
The 127th Infantry was reconstituted in the National Guard per the terms of the National Defense Act of 1920 in 1921, assigned to the 32nd Division, and allotted to the state of Wisconsin. The regiment was reorganized and federally recognized on 1 April 1921 with the headquarters at Oconto, Wisconsin. The headquarters was relocated successively as follows: to Madison, Wisconsin, in 1925; back to Oconto on 27 June 1928; Crandon, Wisconsin, on 31 January 1930. The regiment, or elements thereof, was called up to perform the following state duties: 1st Battalion to perform firefighting duties in Forest County, Wisconsin, 18–24 May 1925; four companies to perform riot control during the “Milk Strike” at Shawano, Wisconsin, 15–20 May 1933; elements to perform labor strike duties at Kohler, Wisconsin, 28 July–20 August 1934. The regiment conducted annual summer training most years at Camp Douglas, Wisconsin, 1921–27, and Camp Williams, Wisconsin, 1928–39. The regiment conducted joint summer training at Camp Douglas with the 101st Division's 401st Infantry in 1928, and at Camp Williams with the 404th Infantry in 1936.

=== World War II ===
The 127th Infantry was inducted into federal service on 15 October 1940, at Crandon. (The 32nd Division was redesignated on 1 August 1942, as 32nd Infantry Division).

On 26 November 1942, the 127th disembarked at Port Moresby after a period of training in Australia. The 3rd Battalion, 127th Infantry Regiment now took over on the Urbana front at Buna during the battle of Buna–Gona. Not able to be supported by tanks due to the terrain and swampy land, the fighting was a desperate tree-by-tree, bunker-by-bunker struggle. On 24 December 1942, First Sergeant, Elmer J. Burr was posthumously awarded first Medal of Honor of the campaign by throwing himself onto a grenade and absorbing the explosion protecting his commanding officer. Later the same day Sergeant, Kenneth E. Gruennert was awarded the Medal of Honor for knocking out two enemy bunkers single-handedly, and after being severely wounded in his attack against the first bunker, attacked the second bunker before being killed by a sniper. Cpl. Clarence J. "Inky" Jungwirth (Ret.) is the last surviving 2nd battalion combat veteran from the battle of Buna–Gona, et al. residing in Oshkosh, WI as of 2014.

The unit was inactivated on 28 February 1946, at Fukuoka, Japan.

== Post-World War II ==
It was reorganized and federally recognized on 18 August 1949 with headquarters in Waukesha, Wisconsin. It was reorganized on 15 February 1959, as the 127th Infantry, a parent regiment under the Combat Arms Regimental System. The 127th Infantry consisted of the 1st, 2nd, and 3rd Battle Groups, elements of the 32d Division.

The 1st, 2nd, and 3rd Battle Groups, 127th Infantry were ordered to active federal service on 15 October 1961, at Appleton, Oshkosh, and Milwaukee, respectively. The 1st, 2nd, and 3rd Battle Groups, 127th Infantry were released from active federal service and reverted to State control on 10 August 1962.

The 127th Infantry reorganized on 1 April 1963, to consist of 1st, 2nd, and, 3rd Battalions.

== Unit insignia ==
- Description

Shield: Azure, on a pale Argent the shoulder sleeve insignia of the 42d Division (the fourth quadrant of a rainbow of three bands, Red, Yellow and Blue) surmounted by the shoulder sleeve insignia of the 32d Division (a Red arrow having shot through a line), both Proper; on a chief of the second three fountains. Crest: That for the regiments of the Wisconsin National Guard: On a wreath of the colors (Argent and Azure) a badger couchant Proper. Motto: LES TERRIBLES.

- Symbolism

See symbolism for coat of arms below.

- Background

The distinctive unit insignia was approved on 16 June 1927.

== Coat of arms ==
=== Blazon ===
- Shield

Azure, on a pale Argent the shoulder sleeve insignia of the 42d Division (the fourth quadrant of a rainbow of three bands, Red, Yellow and Blue) surmounted by the shoulder sleeve insignia of the 32d Division (a Red arrow having shot through a line), both Proper; on a chief of the second three fountains.

- Crest

That for the regiments of the Wisconsin National Guard: On a wreath of the colors (Argent and Azure) a badger couchant Proper. Motto LES TERRIBLES.

- Symbolism
- Shield

The shield is blue for Infantry. The silver of the pale and chief indicates the 127th Infantry is numerically senior to the 128th Infantry in the 64th Infantry Brigade. The 127th Infantry was federally recognizes 14 July 1920, and the 128th Infantry 16 April 1921. Tradition is that the name Wisconsin means "wild rushing waters," therefore, the three fountains, heraldic symbols for water, are used to symbolize the three Wisconsin regiments - The First, Second and Third National Guard Regiments - which were combined and from which organizations were drawn to make up the 127th Infantry; they also signify that the unit has been called into federal service three times – for the Spanish–American War, Mexican Border duty and World War I, at the time the coat of arms was approved. The red arrow was the shoulder sleeve insignia of the 32d Division and the rainbow that of the 42d Division, during World War I. The motto "LES TERRIBLES" is the nom-de-guerre conferred upon the 127th Infantry during World War I.

- Crest

The crest is that of the Wisconsin Army National Guard.

- Background

The coat of arms was approved on 17 June 1927.
