= Western Montana =

Region of Montana

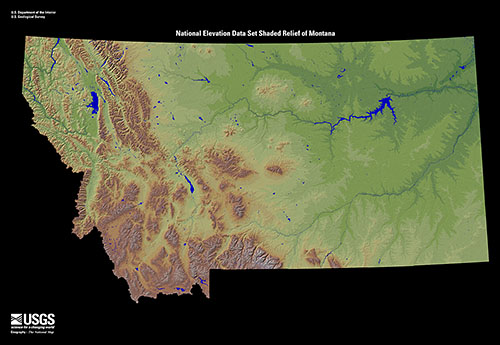
Mountainous Western Montana

Western Montana is the western region of the U.S. state of Montana. The most restrictive definition limits western Montana only to the parts of the state west of the Continental Divide. Other common definitions add in the mountainous areas east of the divide including Beaverhead, Gallatin, Jefferson, Lewis and Clark, Madison, and Park Counties. The region is sometimes considered to be part of the Inland Northwest.

== Geography, biomes and climate ==
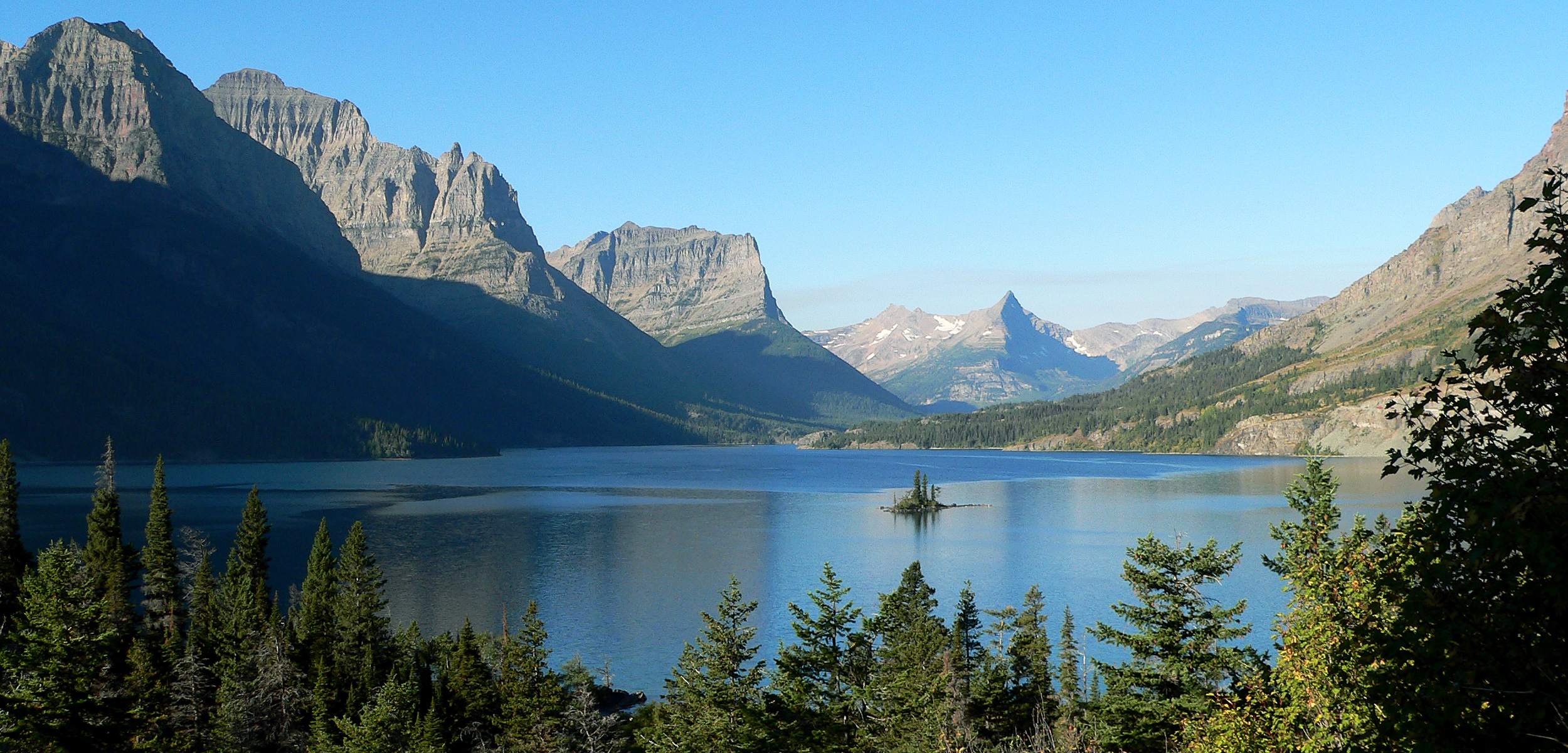
Glacier National Park is located in Western Montana along the Canada–US border

Western Montana is dominated by the Rocky Mountains. Most of Western Montana is covered in forest, prominent species being Ponderosa pine, aspen, and Rocky Mountain Douglas-fir.

Common fauna include the black bear, moose, elk, and coyote. The grizzly bear lives in Glacier National Park, Yellowstone National Park, the Bob Marshall Wilderness and surrounding areas.

Precipitation is lower in the valleys, which are mostly semiarid and receive 8 to 25 inches of precipitation, largely in snow, and higher in the mountains, some areas of which qualify as temperate rainforest, especially in the northwest around Glacier National Park and Libby. Winters are cold, sometimes bitterly cold, and summers are warm.

== History ==
Western Montana was inhabited by the Interior Salish, Kootenay, Shoshone, Flathead, and Kalispel people. In the late 19th century non-indigenous people arrived and established mines and additional cities in the mountains and valleys.

Gold was discovered in Last Chance Gulch in the 1860s and soon the city of Helena was born. Today Helena is the State capital of Montana. Helena still has much of the charm of a 19th-century mining town. Many of the old buildings have been renovated, and hundreds of 19th-century Victorian homes and mansions fill Helena's old neighborhoods. Helena is one of the best-preserved mining towns on the Western frontier. Copper was discovered In Butte and the surrounding areas in the 1870s. Vast quantities of copper were mined, leaving behind the largest Superfund cleanup site in the history of the nation. Copper is still mined at the continental pit in Butte. Missoula is the largest city in Western Montana and the second-largest in the state after Billings.

Western Montana, though faring better than much of the nation, was the portion of the state hit hardest by the current economic downturn. The closing of Smurfit-Stone Container in 2009 caused the loss of 417 jobs directly, with total regional impact predicted as high as 1,500 jobs due to industry linkages. Much of western Montana has felt the effects of a housing bust as well.

== Major cities ==
- Missoula, Montana
- Butte, Montana
- Kalispell, Montana
- Bozeman, Montana

== See also ==
- North Idaho
