= Jeffersonville =

Jeffersonville is the name of several places in the United States:

- Jeffersonville, Georgia
- Jeffersonville, Illinois
- Jeffersonville, Indiana
- Jeffersonville, Kentucky
- Jeffersonville, New York
- Jeffersonville, Ohio
- Jeffersonville, Vermont

== See also ==
- Jefferson § United States
