= Thomas Jefferson Middle School =

Thomas Jefferson Middle School may refer to:

- Thomas Jefferson Middle School (Vancouver, Washington), a public middle school in Vancouver, Washington
- Middle Schools of Arlington County, Virginia, located at 2700 South Lang Street, Arlington, Virginia
- Thomas Jefferson Middle School (Indio), a public middle school for grades 6 - 8
- Thomas Jefferson Middle School (Miami, FL)

== See also ==
- Jefferson Middle School (disambiguation)
