= Jefferson, Wisconsin (disambiguation) =

Jefferson in the U.S. state of Wisconsin may refer to:

- Jefferson County, Wisconsin
- Jefferson, Wisconsin, a city
- Jefferson, Green County, Wisconsin, a town
- Jefferson, Monroe County, Wisconsin, a town
- Jefferson, Vernon County, Wisconsin, a town
- Jefferson, Jefferson County, Wisconsin, a town
- Jefferson Junction, Wisconsin, an unincorporated community
