= Helenville, Wisconsin =

Census-designated place in Wisconsin, United States

- Census-designated place
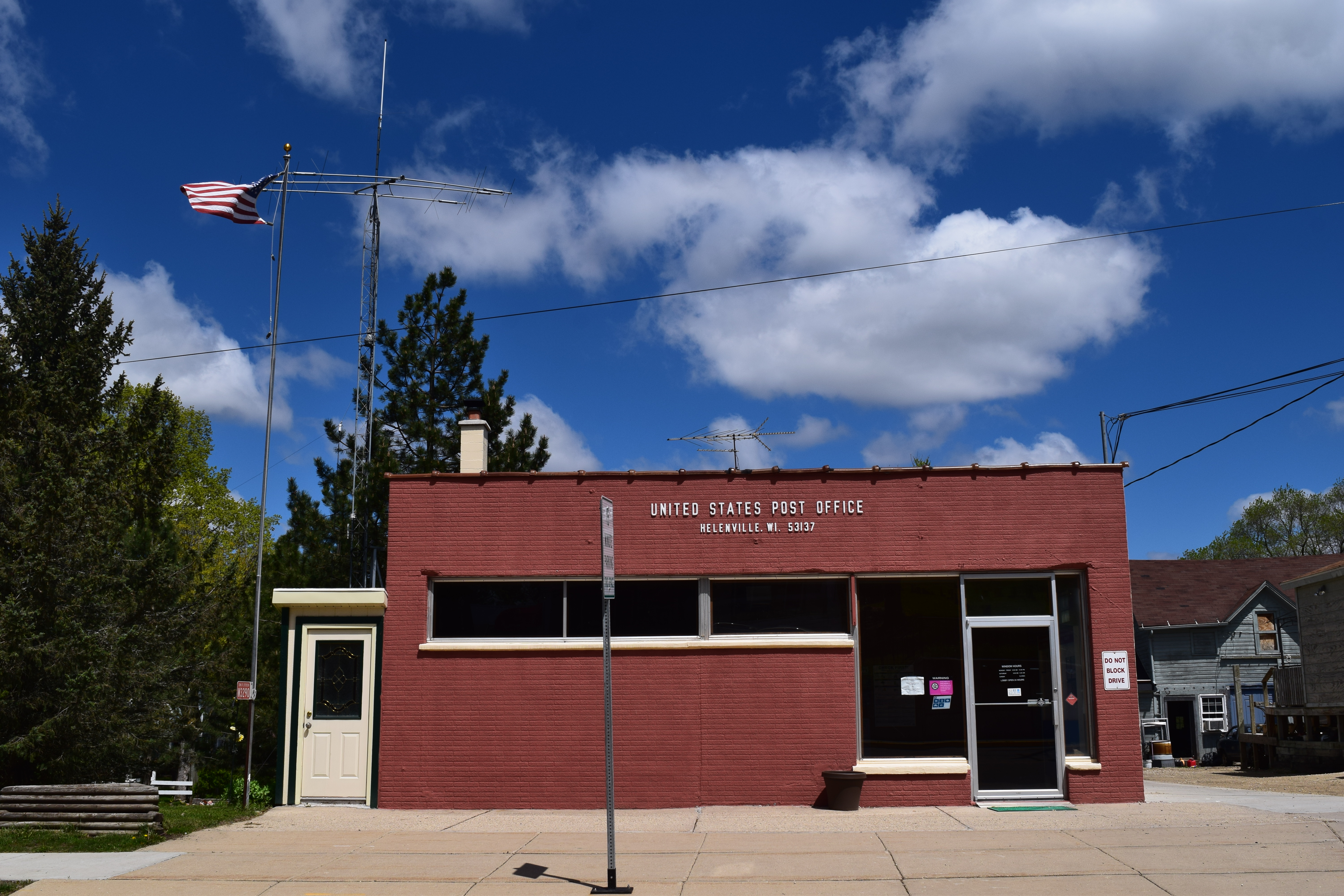
- Helenville post office

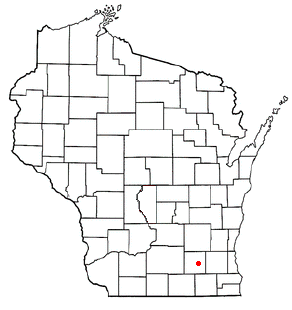
- Location of Helenville, Wisconsin
- Coordinates: 43°1′13″N 88°41′55″W
- Country: United States
- State: Wisconsin
- County: Jefferson
- Town: Jefferson

Area
  - Total: 0.50 sq mi (1.3 km^{2})
  - Land: 0.50 sq mi (1.3 km^{2})
  - Water: 0 sq mi (0.0 km^{2})
- Elevation: 843 ft (257 m)

Population (2020)
  - Total: 238
  - Density: 470/sq mi (180/km^{2})
- Time zone: UTC-6 (Central (CST))
  - Summer (DST): UTC-5 (CDT)
- ZIP Code: 53137
- FIPS code: 55-33825
- GNIS feature ID: 2393045

Helenville is a census-designated place (CDP) in the town of Jefferson, Jefferson County, Wisconsin, United States. The population was 238 at the 2020 census.

== History ==
A post office called Helenville has been in operation since 1851. The community was named in honor of Helen, the attractive wife of the original owner of the town site.

== Geography ==
Helenville is located at 43°01′13″N 88°41′55″W (43.020378, -88.698619).

According to the United States Census Bureau, the CDP has a total area of 0.5 square mile (1.3 km^{2}), all land.

== Demographics ==
Historical population
Census	Pop.	Note	%±
2000	225		—
2010	249		10.7%
2020	238		−4.4%
U.S. Decennial Census

As of the census of 2000, there were 225 people, 74 households, and 54 families residing in the CDP. The population density was 435.2 people per square mile (167.1/km^{2}). There were 77 housing units at an average density of 148.9/sq mi (57.2/km^{2}). The racial makeup of the CDP was 96.00% White, 1.33% Native American, 2.22% from other races, and 0.44% from two or more races. Hispanic or Latino of any race were 3.11% of the population.

There were 74 households, out of which 36.5% had children under the age of 18 living with them, 66.2% were married couples living together, 4.1% had a female householder with no husband present, and 27.0% were non-families. 16.2% of all households were made up of individuals, and 8.1% had someone living alone who was 65 years of age or older. The average household size was 3.04 and the average family size was 3.52.

In the CDP, the population was spread out, with 33.3% under the age of 18, 6.7% from 18 to 24, 28.9% from 25 to 44, 23.1% from 45 to 64, and 8.0% who were 65 years of age or older. The median age was 32 years. For every 100 females, there were 97.4 males. For every 100 females age 18 and over, there were 105.5 males.

The median income for a household in the CDP was $50,089, and the median income for a family was $50,962. Males had a median income of $38,125 versus $21,429 for females. The per capita income for the CDP was $14,334. About 4.3% of families and 4.6% of the population were below the poverty line, including 3.3% of those under the age of eighteen and none of those 65 or over.

== Education ==
St. Peter's Lutheran School is a Christian 4K-8 school of the Wisconsin Evangelical Lutheran Synod in Helenville.

== Notable person ==
- Kenneth E. Gruennert, Medal of Honor

== Supernationals ==
In its last 13 years, Helenville Fire Department hosts the Helenville Supernationals Truck and Tractor Pulls. This event is located on Depot Road at the Helenville Fireman's Park. There are eleven classes which include: gas/diesel stock, open stock, super stock, pro street diesels, SS, LLT (Illinois State Pullers), LLT (Southcentral Wi Tractors), hot farm, altered farm (PI Pullers), and mini rods (tri county). All proceeds benefit the HFD.
