= Yeferson =

Yeferson is a given name. Notable people with the surname include:

- Yeferson Contreras (born 1999), Colombian football forward
- Yeferson Paz (born 2002), Colombian football defender
- Yeferson Quintana (born 1996), Uruguayan football defender
- Yeferson Rodallega (born 2000), Colombian football defender
- Yeferson Soteldo (born 1997), Venezuelan football winger
- Yeferson Suárez (born 2002), Colombian para athlete

== See also ==
- Jefferson (given name)
