= Kenneth E. Gruennert =

U.S. Medal of Honor recipient

- Born: November 19, 1922; Helenville, Wisconsin, US
- Died: December 24, 1942 (aged 20) near Buna, Territory of Papua
- Military career
- Allegiance: United States
- Branch: United States Army
- Service years: 1939 - 1942
- Rank: Sergeant
- Units: 127th Infantry Regiment, 32nd Infantry Division
- Conflicts: World War II
- Awards: Medal of Honor

Kenneth E. Gruennert (November 19, 1922 – December 24, 1942) was a United States Army soldier and a recipient of the United States military's highest decoration—the Medal of Honor—for his actions in World War II.

== Biography ==
Born in Helenville, Wisconsin, on November 19, 1922, Gruennert attended Jefferson High School in nearby Jefferson. During high school he played football and was captain of the school's championship-winning team. At age 16, he enlisted in the Wisconsin Army National Guard from Helenville and served in the 32nd Infantry Division.

The 32nd Division was federalized in 1940, and after the attack on Pearl Harbor the unit began training for combat. On December 24, 1942, Gruennert was fighting the Japanese in the Battle of Buna-Gona in New Guinea as a sergeant with Company L of the 127th Infantry Regiment. Near the village of Buna, he was second-in-command of a platoon tasked with advancing through Japanese positions to a beach 600 yards (550 m) ahead. When they came upon a Japanese bunker, Gruennert single-handedly attacked and silenced the enemy soldiers' position. Although seriously wounded, he refused medical evacuation and successfully attacked a second bunker, but was killed by a sniper immediately after. For these actions, he was posthumously awarded the Medal of Honor ten months later, on October 11, 1943.

== Medal of Honor citation ==
Sergeant Gruennert's official Medal of Honor citation reads:

For conspicuous gallantry and intrepidity in action above and beyond the call of duty. On 24 December 1942, near Buna, New Guinea, Sgt. Gruennert was second in command of a platoon with a mission to drive through the enemy lines to the beach 600 yards ahead. Within 150 yards of the objective, the platoon encountered 2 hostile pillboxes. Sgt. Gruennert advanced alone on the first and put it out of action with hand grenades and rifle fire, killing 3 of the enemy. Seriously wounded in the shoulder, he bandaged his wound under cover of the pillbox, refusing to withdraw to the aid station and leave his men. He then, with undiminished daring, and under extremely heavy fire, attacked the second pillbox. As he neared it he threw grenades which forced the enemy out where they were easy targets for his platoon. Before the leading elements of his platoon could reach him he was shot by enemy snipers. His inspiring valor cleared the way for his platoon which was the first to attain the beach in this successful effort to split the enemy position.

== Awards and decorations ==

Badge	Combat Infantryman Badge		
1st row	Medal of Honor		Bronze Star Medal
2nd row	Purple Heart	Army Good Conduct Medal	American Defense Service Medal
3rd row	American Campaign Medal	Asiatic-Pacific Campaign Medal with 1 campaign star	World War II Victory Medal

== See also ==
- List of Medal of Honor recipients
- List of Medal of Honor recipients for World War II
