= Jefferson (surname) =

Jefferson is a surname of English origin. Deriving from Middle English 'Geffreyson' in the Medieval ages. Notable people with the name include:

== Music ==
- Blind Lemon Jefferson (1893–1929), American Blues musician
- Marshall Jefferson, American musician
- Melissa Jefferson, American singer and rapper known professionally as Lizzo
- Eddie Jefferson, American Jazz vocalist

== Sports ==
- Al Jefferson, American basketball player
- Amile Jefferson, American basketball player
- Brandon Jefferson, American basketball player
- Davon Jefferson (born 1986), American basketball player
- Janae Jefferson (born 1999), American softball player
- Jermar Jefferson (born 2000), American football player
- Jesse Jefferson (1949–2011), American baseball player
- John Jefferson (American football) (born 1956), American football player
- Jordan Jefferson (born 1990), American football player and coach
- Jordan Jefferson (defensive lineman), American football player
- Joshua Jefferson (born 2003), American basketball player
- Julian Jefferson, English cricketer
- Justin Jefferson (born 1999), American football player
- Kiki Jefferson (born 2001), American basketball player
- Malik Jefferson, American football player
- Reggie Jefferson, American baseball player
- Richard Jefferson, American basketball player
- Richard Jefferson (cricketer), English cricketer
- Van Jefferson (born 1996), American football player
- Will Jefferson, English cricketer

== Government ==
- Anna V. Jefferson (1926–2011), New York politician
- Luther P. Jefferson (died 1941), American politician from Maryland
- Mose Jefferson, New Orleans politician, older brother of William J. Jefferson
- Roberto Jefferson, Brazilian politician
- Thomas Jefferson, third president of the United States of America
- Wallace B. Jefferson, Chief Justice of the Supreme Court of Texas
- William J. Jefferson, Louisiana politician, younger brother of Mose Jefferson

== Other ==
- Ann Jefferson (born 1949), British scholar of French literature
- Arthur Stanley Jefferson, birth name of Stan Laurel (1890–1965), English comic actor
- Atatiana Jefferson (1990–2019), shooting victim of the Fort Worth Police Department
- Charles Edward Jefferson (1860–1937), American Congregational clergyman
- Francis Arthur Jefferson (1921–1982), British recipient of the Victoria Cross
- Geoffrey Jefferson (1886–1961), British neurologist and pioneering neurosurgeon
- George Jefferson and Louise Jefferson, fictional couple from the sitcom The Jeffersons and All in the Family
- Henry and Robert Jefferson, British wine merchants with Caribbean estates, subjects of The Rum Story, a visitor attraction in Cumbria, England
- Jane Randolph Jefferson, mother of the president Thomas Jefferson
- Joseph Jefferson (1829–1905), American actor
- Margo Jefferson (born 1947), American writer, critic, professor
- Rowley Jefferson, a fictional character from Jeff Kinney's Diary of a Wimpy Kid franchise

== Lists of people named Jefferson ==
- Thomas Jefferson (disambiguation), various people named "Thomas Jefferson"

== See also ==
- Jefferson (disambiguation)
