= Jefferson, Green County, Wisconsin =

Jefferson, Wisconsin
- Town
- Location in Green County and the state of Wisconsin.
- Coordinates: 42°33′43″N 89°32′1″W
- Country: United States
- State: Wisconsin
- County: Green

Area
  - Total: 38.8 sq mi (100.4 km^{2})
  - Land: 38.8 sq mi (100.4 km^{2})
  - Water: 0 sq mi (0.0 km^{2})
- Elevation: 997 ft (304 m)

Population (2020)
  - Total: 1,170
  - Density: 30.2/sq mi (11.7/km^{2})
- Time zone: UTC-6 (Central (CST))
  - Summer (DST): UTC-5 (CDT)
- Area code: 608
- FIPS code: 55-37875
- GNIS feature ID: 1583450

There are a few other places named Jefferson in Wisconsin.

Jefferson is a town in Green County, Wisconsin, United States. The population was 1,170 at the 2020 census. The census-designated place of Juda is located in the town. The unincorporated community of Twin Grove is also located in the town.

== Geography ==
According to the United States Census Bureau, the town has a total area of 38.8 square miles (100.4 km^{2}), of which 38.8 square miles (100.4 km^{2}) is land and 0.03% is water.

== Demographics ==
As of the census of 2000, there were 1,212 people, 422 households, and 340 families residing in the town. The population density was 31.3 people per square mile (12.1/km^{2}). There were 437 housing units at an average density of 11.3 per square mile (4.4/km^{2}). The racial makeup of the town was 99.09% White, 0.08% African American, 0.25% Asian, 0.17% from other races, and 0.41% from two or more races. Hispanic or Latino of any race were 0.25% of the population.

There were 422 households, out of which 40.5% had children under the age of 18 living with them, 68.7% were married couples living together, 6.4% had a female householder with no husband present, and 19.2% were non-families. 15.2% of all households were made up of individuals, and 7.8% had someone living alone who was 65 years of age or older. The average household size was 2.87 and the average family size was 3.22.

In the town, the population was spread out, with 30.2% under the age of 18, 7.0% from 18 to 24, 29.0% from 25 to 44, 22.9% from 45 to 64, and 10.9% who were 65 years of age or older. The median age was 36 years. For every 100 females, there were 99.3 males. For every 100 females age 18 and over, there were 101.4 males.

The median income for a household in the town was $43,393, and the median income for a family was $46,071. Males had a median income of $30,240 versus $20,800 for females. The per capita income for the town was $22,156. About 2.5% of families and 4.1% of the population were below the poverty line, including 6.2% of those under age 18 and 2.2% of those age 65 or over.
