= Thomas Jefferson (disambiguation) =

Thomas Jefferson (1743–1826) was a Founding Father of the United States and served as its third president.

Thomas Jefferson may also refer to:

== People ==
- Thomas Jefferson (Caymanian politician) (1941–2006)
- Thomas Jefferson (musician) (1920–1986), American trumpeter
- Tom Jefferson (epidemiologist), British epidemiologist
- Thomas Jefferson (actor) (1856–1932), American actor
- Thomas Jefferson (sprinter) (born 1962), American sprinter
- Thomas Garland Jefferson (1847–1864), VMI cadet killed at the Battle of New Market
- Thomas "Tommy" Jefferson, fictional character from Harry's Law

== Compound given name ==
- Thomas Jefferson Byrd (1950–2020), American actor
- Thomas Jefferson Randolph
- Thomas Jefferson Hogg

== Arts and entertainment ==
- Thomas Jefferson: Author of America, 2005 biography by Christopher Hitchens
- Thomas Jefferson (film), 1997 film by Ken Burns
- Thomas Jefferson (miniseries), a 2025 American television documentary miniseries
- Thomas Jefferson (Bitter), a 1915 sculpture by Karl Bitter in Cleveland, Ohio
- Statue of Thomas Jefferson (Columbia University), a 1914 sculpture by William Ordway Partridge
- Thomas Jefferson (University of Virginia), a 1910 statue in front of the Rotunda
- Thomas Jefferson, a 1786 portrait painting by Mather Brown

== Ships ==
- USS Thomas Jefferson, two U.S. Navy ships:
  - USS Thomas Jefferson (APA-30), attack transport in service from 1941 to 1949
  - USS Thomas Jefferson (SSBN-618), Ethan Allen-class ballistic missile submarine commissioned in 1963
- NOAAS Thomas Jefferson, United States National Oceanic and Atmospheric Administration hydrographic survey ship

== Other ==
- List of schools named after Thomas Jefferson
- Thomas Jefferson Association Building, Brooklyn, New York
- Thomas Jefferson Hotel, Birmingham, Alabama
- Thomas Jefferson Library, University of Missouri–St. Louis
- Thomas Jefferson National Accelerator Facility, national laboratory in Newport News, Virginia

== See also ==
- Jefferson (disambiguation)
- The Thomas Jefferson, a United States Supreme Court case named after a boat
- The Thomas Jefferson Hour, a radio show
