= Jefferson, Jefferson County, Wisconsin =

Jefferson, Wisconsin
- Town
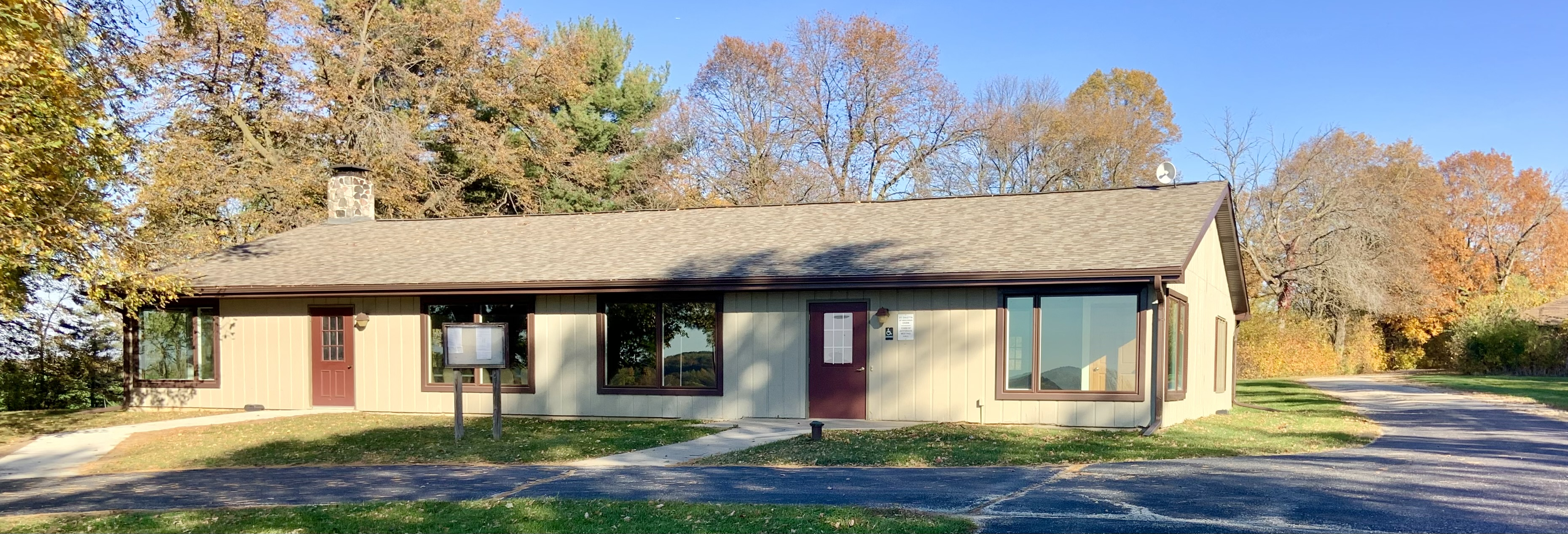
- Town hall

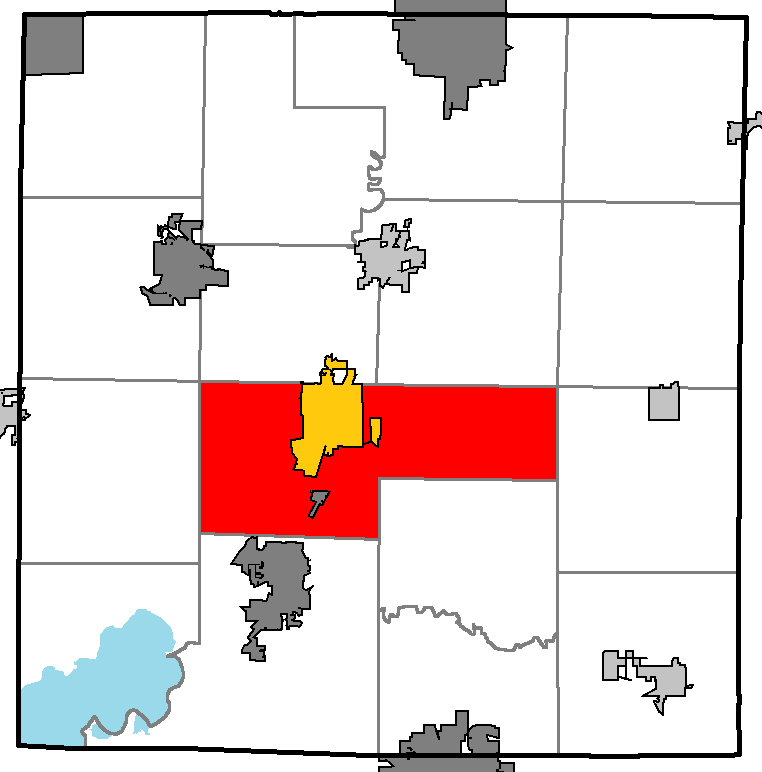
- Location of Jefferson, within Jefferson County
- Interactive map of Jefferson, Wisconsin
- Coordinates: 42°59′33″N 88°46′22″W
- Country: United States
- State: Wisconsin
- County: Jefferson

Area
  - Total: 43.0 sq mi (111.3 km^{2})
  - Land: 42.5 sq mi (110.1 km^{2})
  - Water: 0.46 sq mi (1.2 km^{2})
- Elevation: 807 ft (246 m)

Population (2020)
  - Total: 2,067
  - Density: 48.62/sq mi (18.77/km^{2})
- Time zone: UTC-6 (CST)
  - Summer (DST): UTC-5 (CDT)
- Area code: 920
- FIPS code: 55-37925
- GNIS feature ID: 1583452
- Website: www.townofjefferson.com

There are a few other places named Jefferson in Wisconsin.

Jefferson is a town in Jefferson County, Wisconsin, United States. The population was 2,067 at the 2020 census. The city of Jefferson is located partially within the town. The census-designated place of Helenville is also located in the town.

== Geography ==
According to the United States Census Bureau, the town has a total area of 43.0 square miles (111.3 km^{2}), of which 42.5 square miles (110.1 km^{2}) is land and 0.46 square miles (1.2 km^{2}), or 1.04%, is water.

== Demographics ==
As of the census of 2000, there were 2,265 people, 759 households, and 589 families residing in the town. The population density was 52.1 people per square mile (20.1/km^{2}). There were 793 housing units at an average density of 18.2 per square mile (7/km^{2}). The racial makeup of the town was 98.45% White, 0.18% Black or African American, 0.44% Native American, 0.22% Asian, 0.31% from other races, and 0.4% from two or more races. 0.97% of the population were Hispanic or Latino of any race.

There were 759 households, out of which 29.9% had children under the age of 18 living with them, 69.2% were married couples living together, 4.1% had a female householder with no husband present, and 22.3% were non-families. 16.5% of all households were made up of individuals, and 6.2% had someone living alone who was 65 years of age or older. The average household size was 2.67 and the average family size was 2.98.

In the town, the population was spread out, with 20.9% under the age of 18, 6.3% from 18 to 24, 29.7% from 25 to 44, 29% from 45 to 64, and 14% who were 65 years of age or older. The median age was 41 years. For every 100 females, there were 102.6 males. For every 100 females age 18 and over, there were 103.1 males.

The median income for a household in the town was $52,813, and the median income for a family was $58,350. Males had a median income of $35,341 versus $24,167 for females. The per capita income for the town was $23,327. About 1% of families and 2.2% of the population were below the poverty line, including 2.7% of those under age 18 and 1.8% of those age 65 or over.
