= Jefferson Johnson =

Jefferson Johnson is Director of Choral Activities at the University of Kentucky in Lexington, Kentucky where he conducts the UK Chorale and UK Men's Chorus. He also teaches advanced choral conducting, choral methods and literature, and directs the graduate program (MM and DMA degrees) in choral music. A native of Atlanta, he received the Bachelor of Music degree from the University of Georgia (magna cum laude, 1978), the Master of Music from the University of Tennessee (1981), and the Doctor of Musical Arts degree from the University of Colorado (1992). While living in Atlanta, he was also a member of the Atlanta Symphony Orchestra Chorus and Chamber Chorus conducted by Robert Shaw.

In addition to his work at the University of Kentucky, Dr. Johnson is musical director and conductor of the Lexington Singers, an auditioned community chorus of about 180 singers in Lexington, Kentucky.
