= JJC =

JJC may refer to:

- Jennifer Jo Cobb Racing, a NASCAR team
  - Jennifer Jo Cobb, the team owner and driver
- Jessica-Jane Clement (born 1985), British glamour model, actress and television presenter
- JJC Skillz, (born 1977), Nigerian rapper, singer, songwriter, record producer and television producer
- JJC Foundation, a charitable foundation to support the Clay Sanskrit Library
- Joliet Junior College in Illinois, United States
- Jurong Junior College in Singapore
- New Jersey Juvenile Justice Commission, a state agency of New Jersey, United States
- Woodlands Juvenile Justice Centre, youth detention centre in Northern Ireland

== See also ==
- JJCC, a South Korean hip-hop boy group
