= Jefferson College =

Jefferson College is the name of the following institutions of higher learning:

- Jefferson College (Mississippi), a former college in Mississippi, listed on the National Register of Historic Places
- Jefferson College (Missouri), a two-year community college in Hillsboro, Missouri
- Jefferson Medical College, Philadelphia, Pennsylvania; now known as Thomas Jefferson University
- Jefferson College (Pennsylvania), merged with Washington College (Pennsylvania) in 1865 to form Washington & Jefferson College
- Jefferson College of Health Sciences, Roanoke, Virginia
- Jefferson College (Louisiana), a former college in Convent, Louisiana, listed on the National Register of Historic Places

== See also ==
- Jefferson Community College (disambiguation)
