= Jefferson Park =

Jefferson Park may refer to several places:

- Jefferson Park, Los Angeles, California, a neighborhood
- Jefferson Park (Bakersfield), California, a city park
- Jefferson Park, Pasadena, California, a neighborhood
- Jefferson Park, Denver, Colorado, a neighborhood and park
- Jefferson Park, Chicago, Illinois, a neighborhood
  - Jefferson Park (Chicago park), a city park in Illinois
  - Jefferson Park Transit Center, a bus terminal and railroad station
- Jefferson Park, New Jersey, an unincorporated community
- Jefferson Park (Seattle), Washington, a city park
- Jefferson Park (Oregon), meadows north of Mount Jefferson in the Oregon Cascades
- Thomas Jefferson Park, New York City, a city park
- Coca-Cola Park, which will be renamed to "Jefferson Park" in 2027
