= Jefferson City (disambiguation) =

Jefferson City is the state capital of Missouri in the United States of America.

Jefferson City is the name of several other U.S. places:

- Jefferson City, Montana, small census-designated place in Montana
- Jefferson City, Tennessee, small city in Tennessee, originally called Mossy Creek
