= Jefferson Middle School =

Jefferson Middle School may refer to one of several different educational institutions, including:

- Jefferson Leadership Academies (formerly Thomas Jefferson Middle School), Long Beach, California
- Jefferson Middle School (Oceanside, California)
- Jefferson Middle School (San Gabriel, California)
- Jefferson Middle School (Merritt Island, FL)
- Jefferson Middle School (Champaign, Illinois), Champaign, Illinois
- Jefferson Middle School (Fort Wayne, Indiana), public school in Fort Wayne, Indiana
- Jefferson Middle School (Midland, MI)
- Jefferson Middle School (Columbia, MS), Columbia, Mississippi
- Jefferson Middle School (Columbia, Missouri), Columbia, Missouri
- Jefferson Middle School (St. Charles, MO), St. Charles, Missouri
- Jefferson Middle School (Albuquerque, New Mexico), Albuquerque, New Mexico
- Jefferson Middle School (Jefferson City, Tennessee), Jefferson City, Tennessee
- Jefferson Middle School (Oak Ridge, Tennessee), Oak Ridge, Tennessee
- Jefferson Middle School, Arlington, Virginia
- Jefferson Middle School (Madison, Wisconsin), Madison, Wisconsin
- Jefferson Middle School (Olympia, Washington), Olympia, Washington

== See also ==
- Thomas Jefferson Middle School (disambiguation)
