= Jefferson, Vernon County, Wisconsin =

Jefferson, Wisconsin
- Town
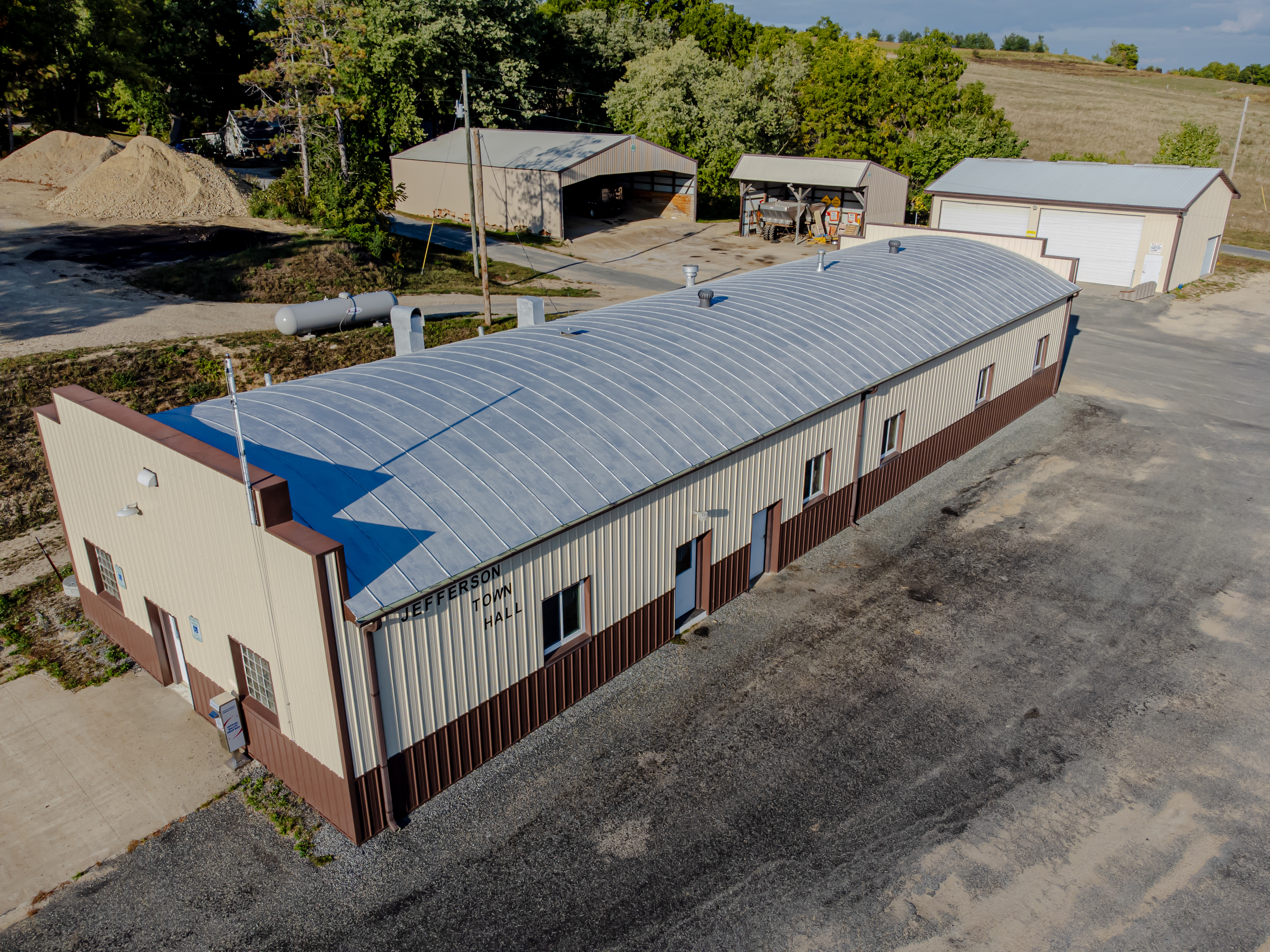
- Jefferson Town Hall

- Location in Vernon County and the state of Wisconsin.
- Coordinates: 43°34′27″N 90°58′45″W
- Country: United States
- State: Wisconsin
- County: Vernon

Area
  - Total: 47.0 sq mi (121.8 km^{2})
  - Land: 46.9 sq mi (121.5 km^{2})
  - Water: 0.077 sq mi (0.2 km^{2})
- Elevation: 1,243 ft (379 m)

Population (2020)
  - Total: 1,270
  - Density: 27.1/sq mi (10.5/km^{2})
- Time zone: UTC-6 (Central (CST))
  - Summer (DST): UTC-5 (CDT)
- Area code: 608
- FIPS code: 55-37975
- GNIS feature ID: 1583454

There are a few other places named Jefferson in Wisconsin.

Jefferson is a town in Vernon County, Wisconsin, United States. The population was 1,270 at the 2020 census. The unincorporated communities of Bud, Esofea, and Springville are located with the town.

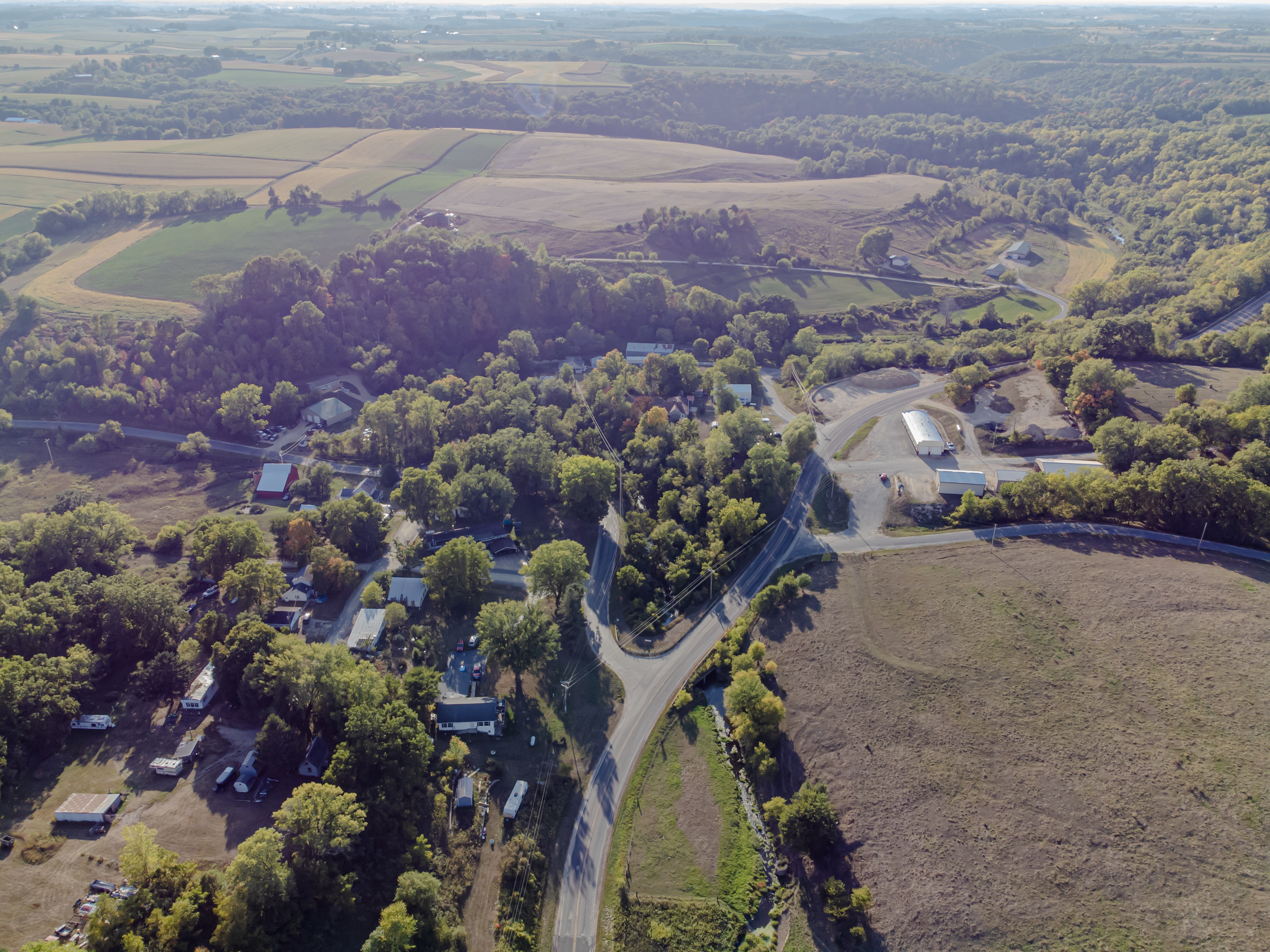
Springville, Vernon County, Wisconsin

== Geography ==
According to the United States Census Bureau, the town has a total area of 47.0 square miles (121.8 km^{2}), of which 46.9 square miles (121.5 km^{2}) is land and 0.1 square mile (0.2 km^{2}) (0.19%) is water.

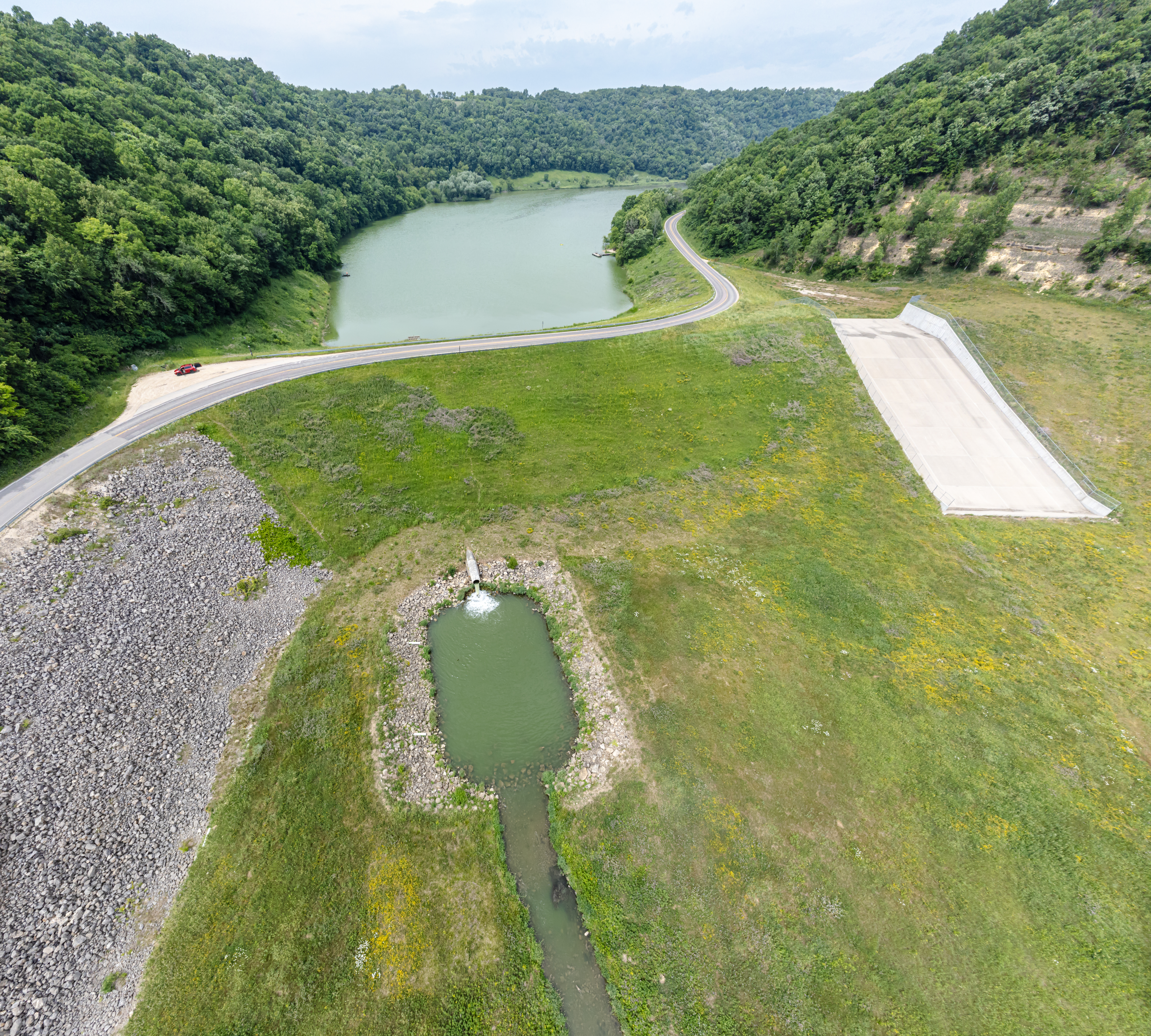
Runge Hollow Lake

== Demographics ==
As of the census of 2000, there were 974 people, 367 households, and 277 families residing in the town. The population density was 20.8 people per square mile (8.0/km^{2}). There were 407 housing units at an average density of 8.7 per square mile (3.3/km^{2}). The racial makeup of the town was 98.67% White, 0.21% Native American, 0.62% from other races, and 0.51% from two or more races. Hispanic or Latino of any race were 1.03% of the population.

There were 367 households, out of which 36.2% had children under the age of 18 living with them, 66.2% were married couples living together, 4.4% had a female householder with no husband present, and 24.3% were non-families. 19.6% of all households were made up of individuals, and 8.4% had someone living alone who was 65 years of age or older. The average household size was 2.65 and the average family size was 3.06.

In the town, the population was spread out, with 28.0% under the age of 18, 5.3% from 18 to 24, 27.2% from 25 to 44, 27.4% from 45 to 64, and 12.0% who were 65 years of age or older. The median age was 38 years. For every 100 females, there were 112.2 males. For every 100 females age 18 and over, there were 117.0 males.

The median income for a household in the town was $37,857, and the median income for a family was $40,893. Males had a median income of $26,042 versus $20,481 for females. The per capita income for the town was $16,144. About 3.8% of families and 6.8% of the population were below the poverty line, including 8.3% of those under age 18 and 8.1% of those age 65 or over.
