= Jefferson (footballer, born January 1989) =

Brazilian footballer

Personal information
- Full name: Jefferson de Souza Leite
- Date of birth: January 7, 1989 (age 37)
- Place of birth: Itapetininga, Brazil
- Height: 1.76 m (5 ft 9 1/2 in)
- Position: Midfielder

Youth career
- Santos

Senior career*
Years	Team	Apps	(Gls)
2008–2011	Dinamo Minsk	13	(1)
2010	→ Dnepr Mogilev (loan)	1	(0)
2011–2012	Sport Huancayo	8	(0)
2017	Willy Serrato	8	(3)
- * Club domestic league appearances and goals

Jefferson de Souza Leite, known as Jefferson (born 7 January 1989 ) is a Brazilian former professional football player.
