= List of places in the United States named after royalty =

Many locations in the United States are named after royalty, including Kings, Queens, Princes, Princesses, and Dukes. Of these, the majority are European royalty, though exceptions exist, such as with Hiram, Maine, which is named after the biblical King Hiram I of Tyre.

== States ==
Eight out of fifty U.S. States are named after European royalty, seven of which were monarchs or consorts.

- Georgia - King George II of Great Britain.
- Louisiana - King Louis XIV of France.
- Maryland - Queen Henrietta Maria of England.
- New York - James, Duke of York, who became King James II of England.
- North Carolina - King Charles IX of France. Name retained by British colonists in honor of King Charles I of England.
- South Carolina - King Charles IX of France. Name retained by British colonists in honor of King Charles I of England.
- Virginia - Queen Elizabeth I of England, in a reference to her epithet The Virgin Queen.
- West Virginia - Queen Elizabeth I of England, in a reference to her epithet The Virgin Queen.

== Counties and boroughs ==
- Albany County, New York - James, Duke of York and Albany and later King James II of England.
- Amelia County, Virginia - Princess Amelia of Great Britain.
- Augusta County, Virginia - Augusta, Princess of Wales.
- Bourbon County, Kentucky - The House of Bourbon, in honor of King Louis XVI of France.
- Brunswick County, North Carolina - George I, King of Great Britain and Duke of Brunswick-Lüneburg.
- Brunswick County, Virginia - George I, King of Great Britain and Duke of Brunswick-Lüneburg.
- Caroline County, Virginia - Queen Caroline.
- Charles City County, Virginia - King Charles I of England when he was still Prince of Wales.
- Charleston County, South Carolina - King Charles II of England.
- Charlotte County, Florida - The Bay of Charlotte Harbor, which was named after Queen Charlotte.
- Cumberland County, Maine - Prince William, Duke of Cumberland
- Cumberland County, New Jersey - Prince William, Duke of Cumberland.
- Cumberland County, Tennessee - Cumberland Mountains, which were named after Prince William, Duke of Cumberland.
- Cumberland County, Virginia - Prince William, Duke of Cumberland.
- Dutchess County, New York - The Duchess of York, born Mary of Modena.
- Dukes County, Massachusetts - James, Duke of York, later King James II of England
- Fluvanna County, Virginia - Queen Anne of Great Britain. Fluvanna River was a previous name for the James River.
- Frederick County, Virginia - Frederick, Prince of Wales.
- Georgetown County, South Carolina - King George II of Great Britain.
- Haakon County, South Dakota - King Haakon VII of Norway.
- Hanover County, Virginia - George I, King of Great Britain and Elector of Hanover.
- Henrico County, Virginia - Henry, Prince of Wales.
- Isabella County, Michigan - Queen Isabella I of Spain.
- James City County, Virginia - James I of England.
- King and Queen County, Virginia - King William III of England and Queen Mary II of England.
- King George County, Virginia - King George I of Great Britain.
- King William County, Virginia - King William III of England.
- Kings County, New York - King Charles II of England.
- Louisa County, Virginia - Princess Louise of Great Britain.
- Lunenburg County, Virginia - George II, King of Great Britain and Duke of Brunswick-Lüneburg.
- Mecklenburg County, North Carolina - Queen Charlotte, born Charlotte of Mecklenburg-Strelitz.
- Mecklenburg County, Virginia - Queen Charlotte, born Charlotte of Mecklenburg-Strelitz.
- Montezuma County, Colorado - Moctezuma II.
- Nassau County, New York - The House of Nassau in honor of King William III of England.
- New York County, New York - James, Duke of York and later King James II of England.
- Orange County, New York - William III, King of the Great Britain and Prince of Orange.
- Orange County, North Carolina - Prince William V of Orange.
- Orange County, Vermont - William III, King of the Great Britain and Prince of Orange.
- Orange County, Virginia - William III, King of the Great Britain and Prince of Orange.
- Orangeburg County, South Carolina - Prince William V of Orange.
- Orleans Parish, Louisiana - Philippe I, Duke of Orleans.
- Prince Edward County, Virginia - Prince Edward, Duke of York and Albany.
- Prince George County, Virginia - Prince George of Denmark, consort of Queen Anne of Great Britain.
- Prince George's County, Maryland - Prince George of Denmark, consort of Queen Anne of Great Britain.
- Prince William County, Virginia - Prince William, Duke of Cumberland.
- Queen Anne's County, Maryland - Queen Anne of Great Britain.
- Queens County, New York - Queen Catherine, born Catherine of Braganza.
- Richmond County, New York - Charles Lennox, 1st Duke of Richmond (Son of Charles II).
- St. Helena Parish, Louisiana - Roman Empress Helena.
- St. Louis County, Minnesota - King Louis IX of France.
- St. Louis County, Missouri - King Louis IX of France.
- Ulster County, New York - James, Duke of York and Earl of Ulster.
- Williamsburg County, South Carolina - King William III of England.
- York County, Maine - James, Duke of York, later King James II of England.
- York County, Pennsylvania - James, Duke of York, later King James II of England.
- York County, South Carolina - James, Duke of York, later King James II of England.

== Cities, towns, and neighborhoods ==
- Alfred, Maine – King Alfred the Great.
- Anna Maria, Florida - Queen Maria Anna of Spain
- Annapolis, Maryland – Queen Anne of Great Britain.
- Augusta, Georgia – Princess Augusta of Saxe-Gotha
- Brunswick, Vermont – from one of the titles for Prince Charles William Ferdinand, Duke of Brunswick.
- Cape Elizabeth, Maine – Queen Elizabeth of Bohemia.
- Charleroi, Pennsylvania - King Charles II of Spain
- Charleston, Mississippi - King Charles II of England.
- Charleston, South Carolina - King Charles II of England.
- Charlestown, Rhode Island - King Charles II of England.
- Charlotte, New York – Princess Charlotte of Wales.
- Charlottesville, Virginia – Princess Charlotte of Wales.
- Charlotte, North Carolina – Queen Charlotte of Mecklenburg-Strelitz.
- Charlotte, Vermont – Queen Charlotte of Mecklenburg-Strelitz.
- Chester, Vermont – King George IV of the United Kingdom, the Earl of Chester.
- Chichester, New Hampshire – Thomas Pelham-Holles, 1st Duke of Newcastle-upon-Tyne.
- Christiana, Delaware – Queen Christina of Sweden.
- Christiana, Pennsylvania – Queen Christina of Sweden.
- Cumberland, Maryland – Prince William, Duke of Cumberland.
- Cumberland, Rhode Island - Prince William, Duke of Cumberland.
- East St. Louis, Illinois - King Louis IX of France.
- Fernandina Beach, Florida – King Ferdinand VII of Spain.
- Fort Ann, New York - Queen Anne of Great Britain.
- Fort Ann (village), New York - Queen Anne of Great Britain.
- Fort Edward, New York – Prince Edward, Duke of York and Albany
- Fredericksburg, Virginia - Prince Frederick of Wales.
- Georgetown, Washington, D.C. - Likely named after King George II of Great Britain.
- Hildebran, North Carolina – Pope Gregory VII (né Hildebrand), ruler of the Papal States.
- Hiram, Maine - King Hiram I of Tyre (biblical).
- Jamestown, Rhode Island - King James II of England.
- Jamestown, Virginia - King James I of England.
- Kinston, North Carolina - King George III of Great Britain.
- Louisa, Virginia – Princess Louisa of Great Britain
- Louisville, Kentucky - King Louis XVI of France.
- Lunenburg, Massachusetts – from one of the titles of King George II of Great Britain, Duke of Brunswick-Lüneburg.
- Lunenburg, Vermont - from one of the titles for Prince Charles William Ferdinand, Duke of Brunswick.
- Maryland, New York - Queen Henrietta Maria of England.
- New Brunswick, New Jersey – George II of Great Britain (also Duke of Brunswick).
- New Marlborough, Massachusetts – John Churchill, Duke of Marlborough (indirectly, via Marlborough, Massachusetts)
- New Orleans, Louisiana – Philippe II, Duke of Orléans.
- New York City - The Duke of York, James. Later became King James II of England.
- Newcastle, Maine – Thomas Pelham-Holles, 1st Duke of Newcastle-upon-Tyne.
- Orleans, Massachusetts – Louis Philippe II, Duke of Orléans.
- Orange, Connecticut – William III, Prince of Orange. Later King William III of England.
- Orange, Massachusetts – William III, Prince of Orange.
- Orange, New Jersey – William III, Prince of Orange.
- Orange, Ohio – William III, Prince of Orange.
- Orange, Vermont – William III, Prince of Orange.
- Orange, Virginia – William III, Prince of Orange.
- Orangeburg, South Carolina – William III, Prince of Orange. Later King William III of England.
- Prince Frederick, Maryland – Prince Frederick of Wales.
- Princeville, Hawaii - Prince Albert Kamehameha of Hawai'i.
- Princess Anne, Virginia Beach, Virginia-Princess Anne, later Queen Anne
- Queen Anne, Maryland - Queen Anne of Great Britain.
- Queen Anne, Seattle - Queen Anne of Great Britain.
- Queens Village, Queens - Catherine of Braganza.
- Rochester, New Hampshire – Laurence Hyde, 1st Earl of Rochester.
- Rochester, Ulster County, New York – Laurence Hyde, 1st Earl of Rochester.
- San Luis Rey, Oceanside, California - King Louis IX of France.
- St. Louis, Missouri - King Louis IX of France.
- Tancred, California – Tancred, Prince of Galilee.
- Victoria, Kansas - Queen Victoria of the U.K.
- Victoria, Virginia - Queen Victoria of the U.K.
- Virginia City, Nevada - Queen Elizabeth I of England, in a reference to her epithet The Virgin Queen.
- Williamsburg, Virginia - King William III of England.
- York, Maine - The Duke of York, James. Later became King James II of England.

== Census designated places ==
- Amelia Court House, Virginia - Princess Amelia of Great Britain.
- King George, Virginia - King George I of Great Britain.
- King of Prussia, Pennsylvania - Named after a local tavern, which was named after King Frederick II of Prussia.
- Prince of Wales–Hyder Census Area, Alaska - Named after Prince of Wales Island, Alaska, which was named after George, Prince of Wales.

== Other ==
=== Buildings and rooms ===
- Mission San Luis Rey de Francia - King Louis IX of France
- Queen Anne Hotel - Queen Anne of Great Britain.
- Queens' Bedroom - Queen Elizabeth II of the U.K.

=== Monuments and shrines ===
- Saint John Paul II National Shrine - Pope John Paul II of the Vatican City State
- Queen Elizabeth II September 11th Garden - Queen Elizabeth II of the U.K.

=== Rivers and piers ===
- Charles River - King Charles I of England.
- Elizabeth River, Virginia - Princess Elizabeth Stuart.
- James River - King James VI and I.
- North Anna River - Queen Anne of Great Britain.
- Rapidan River - Queen Anne of Great Britain (The name is a conjunction of the phrase "Rapid Anne").
- Rivanna River - Queen Anne of Great Britain.
- San Luis Rey River - King Louis IX of France
- South Anna River - Queen Anne of Great Britain.
- Queen's Landing - Queen Elizabeth II of the U.K.

=== Seminaries ===
- Pope St. John XXIII National Seminary - Pope John XXIII the Vatican City State.
- Saint John Paul II Seminary, Washington, D.C. - Pope John Paul II of the Vatican City State.
- St. Pius X Seminary (Loras College) - Pope Pius X, de facto Sovereign of the States of the Church.

=== Schools ===
- John Paul II Catholic School (Houston) - Pope John Paul II of the Vatican City State.
- John Paul II High School (Plano, Texas) - Pope John Paul II of the Vatican City State.
- Kamehameha Schools - Named after the House of Kamehameha.
- King George High School - King George I of Great Britain.
- Pope John Paul II High School (Tennessee) - Pope John Paul II of the Vatican City State.
- Queen Anne's County High School - Queen Anne of Great Britain.
- Saint John Paul the Great Catholic High School - Pope John Paul II of the Vatican City State.
- Saint Louis School - King Louis IX of France.
- St. John Paul II High School (Massachusetts) - Pope John Paul II of the Vatican City State.
- St. Louis Catholic High School - King Louis IX of France.

=== Universities ===
- College of William & Mary - King William III of England and Queen Mary II of England.
- Georgetown University - Likely named after King George II of Great Britain.
- John Paul the Great Catholic University - Pope John Paul II, Sovereign of the Vatican City State
- Saint Louis University - King Louis IX of France.
