= Jefferson State =

Jefferson State may refer to:

- Jefferson Territory (historical Mountain territory), 1859 unrecognized U.S. territory
- Jefferson (proposed Southern state), 1915 proposed U.S. state
- Jefferson (proposed Pacific state), 1941 proposed U.S. state
- Jefferson State Community College, in Alabama, U.S.

== See also ==
- Jefferson (disambiguation)
