= Ulmus americana 'Jefferson' =

Elm cultivar

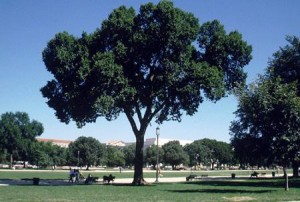
- The original 'Jefferson' elm on the National Mall in Washington, D.C. (March 2014)
- Species: Ulmus americana
- Cultivar: 'Jefferson'
- Origin: National Park Service, US

The American elm cultivar Ulmus americana 'Jefferson' was cloned from a tree growing near a path in front of the Freer Gallery of Art, close to the Smithsonian Institution Building ("The Castle") on the National Mall in Washington, D.C. The United States National Park Service, which had planted the tree during the 1930s, cloned it in 1993 after screening tests showed that it possessed an outstanding level of tolerance to Dutch elm disease (DED).

In 2005, the Park Service and the Agricultural Research Service (ARS) of the United States Department of Agriculture jointly released the clone (formerly NPS 3–487) to the nursery trade as 'Jefferson'. The parent tree appears to have remained unscathed by DED in 2014.

== Description ==
'Jefferson' is distinguished by its low, spreading form with arching limbs and broad U-shaped crotches. The parent tree on the National Mall has reached a height of about 68 feet (20.7 m) after 80 years. Ploidy: 2n = 42.

== Genetics ==
Early studies on the parent tree found that the tree has triploid chromosomes, suggesting that it may be a hybrid between the tetraploid American elm and an unknown diploid species. A genetic study that the ARS conducted on the clone at the United States National Arboretum in Washington, D. C., during 2004 confirmed the tree as Ulmus americana, despite having some atypical features.

A subsequent ARS study also confirmed that the tree is a triploid. The study's investigators concluded that a crossing of two American elms, one a tetraploid, the other a less common diploid, had created the tree. The investigators found no triploids among the 81 wild trees that they sampled.

== Pests and diseases ==
The tree proved highly resistant to Dutch elm disease in an ARS trial (as clone N 3487/NA 62001). NA 62001 showed little damage from elm leaf beetle (Xanthogaleruca luteola) feeding during a 2009—2010 survey at an Oklahoma arboretum. 'Jefferson' is susceptible to elm yellows phytoplasma infection, as are other U. americana DED-resistant cultivars and native trees of that species.

The Japanese beetle (Popillia japonica) highly prefers U. americana when feeding. Verticillium wilt had a greater effect on U. americana than it had on all other elms studied in an investigation of that fungal disease.

== Cultivation ==
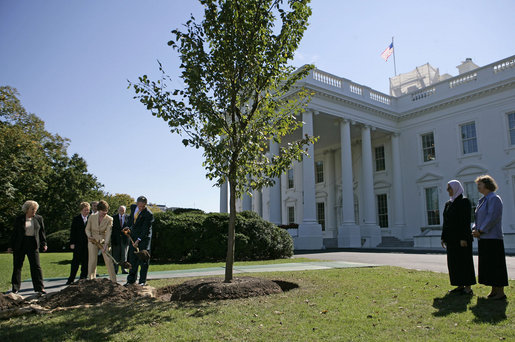
President George W. Bush and First Lady Laura Bush planting a 'Jefferson' clone outside of the White House in October 2006.

'Jefferson' has not been widely tested beyond Washington D.C. National Elm Trial results were inconclusive and provided no data on ‘Jefferson’ because of an early error in tree identification that occurred in the nursery trade. The error may still be causing nurseries to sell 'Princeton' elms that are mislabeled as 'Jefferson', although one can distinguish between the two cultivars as the trees mature. The Golden Hill Nursery in Kent introduced 'Jefferson' to the United Kingdom in 2010, but the clone remains rare in cultivation.

On October 2, 2006, President George W. Bush and First Lady Laura Bush planted a clone of the Jefferson elm tree on the west side of the North Grounds center panel of the White House. The clone came from the original tree located on the National Mall.

== Accessions ==
=== North America ===
- Bartlett Tree Experts, US. Acc. nos. 2001-255/6/7.
- Longwood Gardens, US. Acc. no. 2002-0413.
- United States National Arboretum, Washington, D.C., US. Acc. nos. 76448, 76625, 57844.

=== Europe ===
- Grange Farm Arboretum, Sutton St James, Spalding, Lincolnshire, UK. Acc. no. not known.
