= Jefferson (footballer, born 1970) =

Brazilian footballer

Personal information
- Full name: Jefferson Tomaz de Souza
- Date of birth: 22 November 1970 (age 55)
- Height: 1.81 m (5 ft 11 in)
- Position: Midfielder

Senior career*
Years	Team	Apps	(Gls)
1993–1994	Santa Marta Penaguião		
1994–1995	Paredes		
1995–1997	Vizela		
1997–1999	Leça		
1999–2000	Varzim		
2000–2001	Freamunde		
2001–2002	Paredes		
2002–2003	Lixa		
2003–2004	GD Beira-Mar		
2004–2005	Rebordosa		
2005–2007	Ataense		
- * Club domestic league appearances and goals

Jefferson Tomaz de Souza (born 22 November 1970) is a retired Brazilian football midfielder.
