= Jefferson Community College =

Jefferson Community College may refer to:

- Jefferson Community College, now known as Jefferson Community and Technical College, a two-year Kentucky college
- Jefferson Community College (New York), a two-year college located in Watertown, New York
- Jefferson Community College, later known as Eastern Gateway Community College, Jefferson County, Ohio
- Jefferson Community College (Missouri), Jefferson County, Missouri
- Jefferson State Community College, with multiple campuses in Alabama

== See also ==
- Jefferson Community and Technical College, a community college in Louisville, Kentucky
