= Jeff =

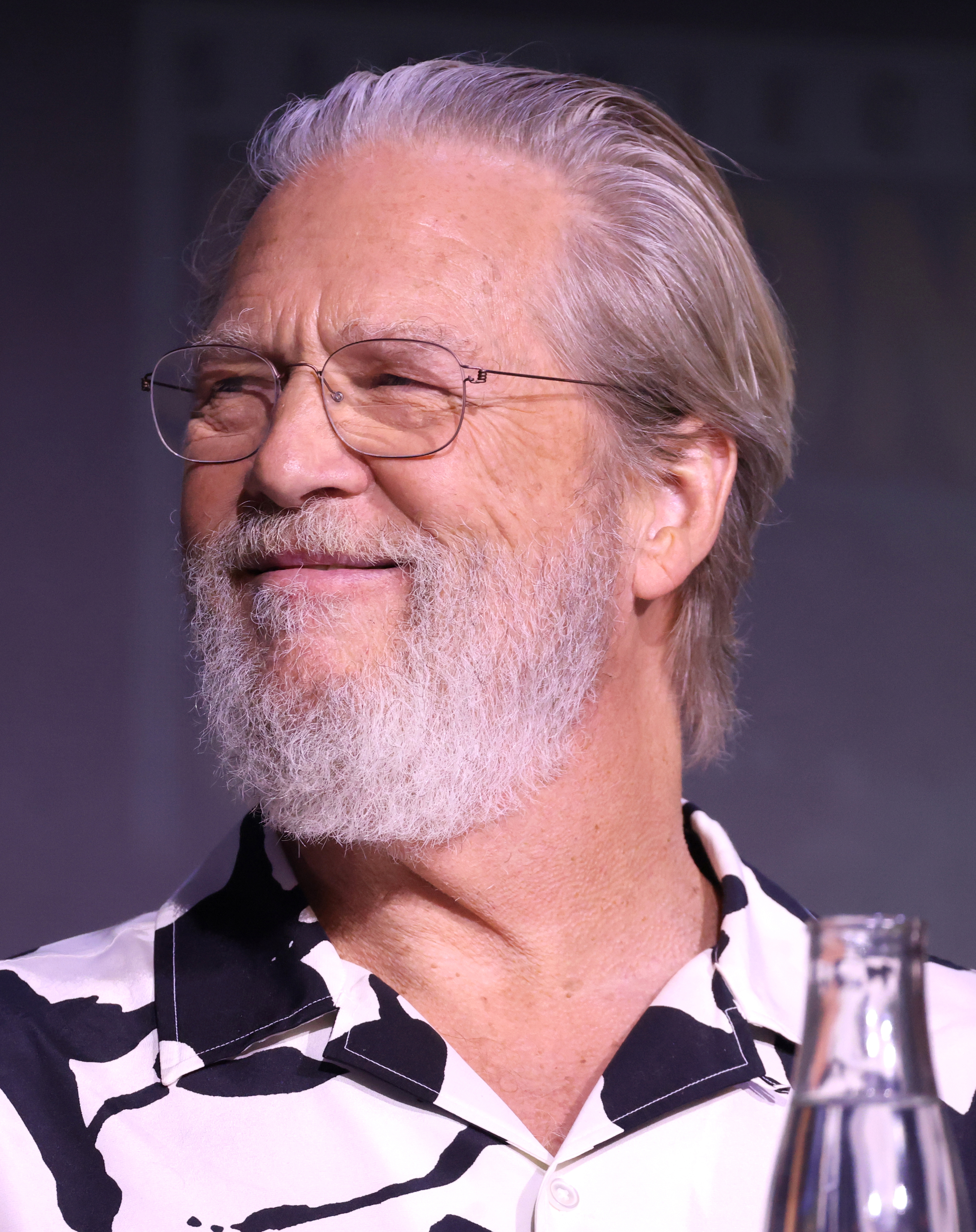
- Jeff Bridges in 2025
- Pronunciation: /dʒɛf/
- Gender: Male

Origin
- Origin: Francia, Medieval France, Norman England

Other names
- Related names: Jeffrey, Jeffery, Jef, Jeffry, Jefferson

Jeff is a masculine name, often a short form (hypocorism) of the English given names Jefferson or Jeffrey, the latter of which comes from a medieval variant of Geoffrey.

== Academics ==
- Jeff Kuhn, physicist and astronomer
- Jeff Remmel, American mathematician
- Jeff S. Shamma, professor of electrical engineering
- Jeff Sigafoos, New Zealand professor of educational psychology
- Jeff Todd Titon (born 1943), professor of music and author

== Arts and entertainment ==
=== Film and television ===
- Jeff Anderson, American actor
- Jeff Bennett, American voice actor and singer
- Jeff Bergman, American voice actor
- Jeff Bollow, American writer and director
- Jeff Brazier (born 1979), English television presenter and reality TV personality
- Jeff Bridges, American actor
- Jeff Canoy (born 1984), Filipino broadcast journalist and documentary film maker
- Jeff Chandler (1918–1961), American film actor
- Jeff Cohen (actor), American attorney and former child actor who appeared as Chunk in the 1985 movie The Goonies
- Jeff Conaway (1950–2011), American actor
- Jeff Coopwood, American actor, singer, broadcaster and educator
- Jeff Corey (1914–2002), American stage and screen actor and director
- Jeff Corwin, American animal and nature conservationist, host of The Jeff Corwin Experience and Corwin's Quest
- Jeff Daniels, American actor
- Jeff B. Davis, American actor, comedian and singer
- Jeff Deverett, Canadian film producer
- Jeff Dunham, American ventriloquist and comedian
- Jeff East, American actor
- Jeff Foxworthy, American comedian and actor
- Jeff Garcia (1975–2025), American comedian and actor
- Jeff Garlin, American comedic actor
- Jeff Goldblum, American film actor
- Jeff Hunter, American film actor
- Jeff Hyslop (born 1951), Canadian actor, singer, dancer, choreographer, and director
- Jeff Katz, American film producer and studio executive
- Jeff Lemire (born 1976), Canadian comic book writer, artist, and television producer
- Jeff Loveness, American screenwriter and television producer
- Jeff Machado (died 2023), Brazilian actor
- Jeff Maxwell, American actor
- Jeff McCarthy, American character actor
- Jeff "Swampy" Marsh, American television director, writer, producer, storyboard artist, and actor
- Jeff Osterhage, American film and television actor
- Jeff Probst, American television personality, host of Survivor
- Jeff Shannon (1961–2013), American film critic
- Jeff Stelling, British sports journalist, sport television presenter and game show host
- Jeff Stevenson (born 1961), English actor and comedian
- Jeff Thisted, American game show host
- Jeff Yagher, American actor
- Jeff York (1912–1995), American actor

=== Literature ===
- Jeff Abbott, American suspense novelist
- Jeff Kinney, American game designer, cartoonist, producer, actor, and children's book author
- James Neff, American non-fiction author and investigative journalist
- Jeff Noon, British novelist, short story writer, and playwright
- Jeff VanderMeer, American writer
- Jeff Weiss, American playwright, impresario, and actor

=== Music ===
- Excision (musician), Canadian dubstep producer and DJ Jeff Abel
- Jeff Abercrombie, bassist for American rock band Fuel
- Jeff Alexander (1910–1989), American conductor, arranger, and composer of film, radio, and television scores
- Jeff Allen, English session drummer
- Jeff Baxter, American guitarist for rock bands Steely Dan and The Doobie Brothers
- Jeff Beal (born 1963), American composer of music for various media
- Jeff Beck (1944–2023), English guitarist
- Jeff Buckley (1966–1997), American singer-songwriter
- Jeff Coffin, saxophonist, bandleader, composer and educator
- Jeff Current, lead singer of American alternative rock band Against All Will
- Jeff Fatt, Australian musician and actor, formerly with the children's band The Wiggles
- Jeff Gillan, American journalist
- Jeff Graham, Canadian radio DJ
- Jeff Hanneman (1964–2013), American guitarist, founding member of the thrash metal band Slayer
- Jeff Hartford, Canadian DJ and producer
- Jeff Healey (1966–2008), Canadian blues-rock guitarist and songwriter
- Jeff Loomis, lead guitarist for heavy metal band Nevermore
- Jeff Lynne, British singer-songwriter and record producer
- Jeff Mangum, American singer-songwriter and founder of Neutral Milk Hotel
- Jeff Mills, American techno DJ and producer
- Jeff Pilson (born 1959), American musician
- Jeff Porcaro (1954–1992), American session drummer and member of the rock band Toto
- Jeff Satur, Thai singer and actor
- Jeff Scott Soto, American rock singer of Puerto Rican descent
- Jeff Stinco, Canadian singer-songwriter and lead guitarist for pop-punk band Simple Plan
- Jeff Timmons, American pop singer, producer, and pop group 98 Degrees founding member
- Jeff Tweedy, American singer-songwriter and founding member of Wilco
- Jeff Ward (musician) (1962–1993), American musician
- Jeff Waters, Canadian thrash metal guitarist for band Annihilator

=== Other arts and entertainment ===
- Jeff Koons, American artist
- Jeff Smith, American cartoonist
- Jeff Sneider, American entertainment journalist

== Business ==
- Jeff Bezos, American entrepreneur, industrialist, media proprietor, investor, and former chief executive officer of Amazon
- Jeff Fairburn, British businessman
- Jeff Green (born 1977), American billionaire advertising executive
- Jeff Hawkins, founder of Palm Computing and Handspring
- Jeff Kaplan, vice president of Blizzard Entertainment
- Jeff Kwatinetz, American entertainment executive
- Jeff Steele (born 1971), American entertainment industry executive

== Politics ==
- Jeff Adachi, San Francisco Public Defender, pension reform advocate, and San Francisco mayoral candidate
- Jeff Bingaman, junior U.S. Senator from New Mexico
- Jeff Cooling (born 1987), Iowa state representative
- Jeff Flake, U.S. Senator from Arizona
- Jeff Kennett, premier of Victoria, Australia
- Jeff Kurtz (born 1954), Iowa state representative
- Jeff Landry, Governor of Louisiana
- Jeff Merkley, U.S. Senator from Oregon
- Jeff Sessions, United States Attorney General and US Senator
- Jeff Spicer, Missouri state representative
- Jeff Truly (1861–1946), Mississippi legislator and judge

== Programming ==
- Jeff Dean, a senior fellow at Google and inventor of many of Google's core technologies
- Jeff Minter, British computer/video game designer and programmer
- Jeff Moss, American hacker, computer and internet security expert

== Sports ==
- Jeff Abbott (baseball), American retired professional baseball player
- Jeff Abbott (racing driver), American professional motorsport drifter
- Jeff Adams, Canadian Paralympian and wheelchair sport world champion
- Jeff Adrien, college basketball player
- Jeff Agoos (born 1968), retired Swiss-born American soccer defender
- Jeff Allam, British racing driver
- Jeff Altenburg, American professional race car driver
- Jeff Andretti, American race car driver
- Jeff Astle (1942–2002), English footballer
- Jeff Bagwell, Hall of Fame American baseball player
- Jeff Bearden (born 1963), American professional wrestler
- Jeff Bennett (athlete) (born 1948), American decathlete
- Jeff Bes, Canadian ice hockey player
- Jeff Blake, American football player
- Jeff Blatnick (1957–2012), American super heavyweight Greco-Roman wrestler
- Jeff Burton, NASCAR racer
- Jeff Butler (football manager) (1934–2017), English football manager
- Jeff Carter, Canadian ice hockey player
- Jeff Chandler (boxer), boxing champion
- Jeff Cheung, American skateboarder and artist
- Jeff Cirillo, retired baseball player
- Jeff Clement, American baseball player
- Jeff Cobb (born 1982), American professional wrestler
- Jeff Coetzee, South African professional tennis player
- Jeff Conine, retired baseball player
- Jeff Curran (born 1977), American retired professional mixed martial artist
- Jeff Curran (footballer) (born 1961), Scottish-born Australian former soccer player
- Jeff Elliott, British decathlete and pole vaulter
- Jeff Farmer (wrestler) (born 1962), American retired professional wrestler
- Jeff Fenech, Australian boxer
- Jeff Ferguson (ice hockey) (born 1969), Canadian ice hockey and roller hockey goaltender
- Jeff Foster (basketball) (born 1977), American basketball player
- Jeff Francis, baseball player
- Jeff Francoeur, baseball player
- Jeff Friesen, NHL player
- Jeff Garcia, American football player
- Jeff Gaylord (1958–2023), American professional wrestler
- Jeff George, American football player
- Jeff Gladney (born 1996), American football player
- Jeff Gordon, NASCAR racer
- Jeff Graham, American football player
- Jeff Graham (quarterback), American football player
- Jeff Green (basketball), American professional basketball forward
- Jeff Guiel, Canadian baseball player
- Jeff Halliburton (born 1949), American former basketball player
- Jeff Halpern (born 1976), American NHL hockey player
- Jeff Hardy (born 1977), American professional wrestler
- Jeff Holland (born 1997), American football player
- Jeff Hopkins (born 1964), Welsh football manager
- Jeff Hornacek, American basketball player
- Jeff Horton American football coach
- Jeff Jarrett, American professional wrestler
- Jeff Kent, baseball player
- Jeff Leiding, American football player
- Jeff Leka, American racing driver
- Jeff Lindgren, American baseball player
- Jeff Locke (American football), American football player
- Jeff Lockie, American football player
- Jeff Loots, American football player
- Jeff Luc, American football player
- Jeff McIntyre (born 1954), American football player
- Jeff Mills (linebacker), American football player
- Jeff Monson (born 1971), American mixed martial artist, boxer, and submission grappler
- Jeff Newman (baseball) (born 1948), American baseball player
- Jeff Nielsen, professional hockey player
- Jeff Norton, National Hockey League player
- Jeff Okudah (born 1999), American football player
- Jeff Otis, American football player
- Jeff Overbaugh, American football player
- Jeff Pain, American-born Canadian skeleton racer
- 3.0 (professional wrestling), Canadian professional wrestler Jeff Parker
- Jeff Phillips (skateboarder) (1963–1993), American professional skateboarder
- Jeff Reed (American football), American football player
- Jeff Reed (baseball), retired baseball player
- Jeff Salzenstein (born 1973), American tennis player
- Jeff Samardzija (born 1985), Major League Baseball pitcher
- Jeff Shantz, National Hockey League player
- Jeff Simmons (racing driver), American race car driver
- Jeff Skinner, Canadian National Hockey League player
- Jeff Speakman, American actor and martial artist
- Jeff Stevenson (rugby league) (1932–2007), English rugby league footballer
- Jeff Stork, American volleyball player
- Charles Jeff Tesreau (1888–1946), American Major League Baseball pitcher
- Jeff Thomson, Australian cricketer
- Jeff Van Gundy, American NBA coach and broadcaster
- Jeff Walz (born 1971), American basketball coach
- Jeff Williams (baseball), pitcher for the Hanshin Tigers
- Jeff Williams (cyclist), British cyclist
- Jeff Wilson (American football) (born 1995), American football player
- Jeff Wiseman (born 1950), Australian Paralympic athlete and businessman
- Jeff Withey (born 1990), American basketball player

== Other fields ==
- Jeff Arcuri (born 1987 or 1988), American stand-up comedian
- Jeff Cooper (1920–2006), United States Marine and firearms expert
- Jeff Erlanger (1970–2007), American advocate and activist for disability rights
- Jeff Kidder (1875–1908), American lawman
- Jeff Luers, American anarchist, environmental activist, and arsonist
- Jeff Nuttall, British 1960s counter-culture figure
- Jeff Weise (1988–2005), American mass murderer and spree killer
- Jeff Wooller, British accountant
- Jeff Greason, American inventor and proponent of space settlement

== Fictional characters ==
- Jeff, one half of the comic-strip duo Akbar and Jeff of Life in Hell
- Jeff, the main character in the 1980s Canadian children's television program Today's Special
- Jeff, the alter ego of Jenko in the film 22 Jump Street
- Jeff, in the 2004 American comedy movie Connie and Carla
- Jeff, best friend of Clarence in the 2014–17 American animated television series Clarence
- Jeff McCallister, in the Home Alone franchise
- Jeff, in the video game EarthBound
- Jeff, an enemy in the 2020 VR game Half-Life: Alyx
- Jeff Albertson, more commonly known as Comic Book Guy, from The Simpsons
- Jeff Atkins, a character in the Netflix series 13 Reasons Why
- Jeff Bennett, in the sitcom Taxi
- Jeff Boomhauer, from the American television series King of the Hill
- Jeff Colby, in the American television series Dynasty and The Colbys
- Jeff Daly, in the film Rumor has it..., played by Mark Ruffalo
- Jeff Denlon, in the Saw franchise
- Jeff Difford, in the television series Young Sheldon
- Jeff Fungus, in the Monsters, Inc. franchise named after Jeff Gordon, voiced by Frank Oz
- Jeff Gorvette, in Pixar's Cars franchise
- Jeff Heaney, a recurring character in the sitcom Peep Show
- Jeff Isaacs, in the television series Degrassi: The Next Generation
- Jeff K., on the Something Awful comedy website
- Jeff the Killer, from the creepypasta of the same name
- Jeff the Land Shark, a Marvel Comics character
- Jeff Murdock, a main character in the first three seasons of the British sitcom Coupling
- Jeff Pringles, the teacher from Postman Pat
- Jeff Suckler, a minor character in the FX series What We Do In The Shadows
- Jeff Thompkins, title character in the 2011 comedy-drama film Jeff, Who Lives at Home
- Jeff Winger, main character in the NBC sitcom Community
- Jeff, an alien worm in the 2002 science fiction film Men in Black II

== See also ==
- Jef, short form of Josef/Jozef
- Jeph Jacques, webcomic maker, Questionable Content
