= JEF =

JEF or Jef may refer to:

== Organisations ==
- Japan Economic Foundation, an NGO affiliated with Japan's Ministry of International Trade and Industry
- Jefferies Financial Group (ticker symbol: NYSE:JEF), an American financial services company
- Jeunes Européens Fédéralistes (Young European Federalists), a political youth organisation
- Joint Expeditionary Force, a UK-led Northern European multi-national military partnership

== Transportation ==
- Jefferson City Memorial Airport (IATA airport code: JEF) in Missouri, US
- Jefferson City station (Amtrak station code: JEF), in Missouri, US

== Other uses ==
- Jef, a Dutch-language masculine given name primarily found in Belgium
- "Jef", a Jacques Brel song on the album Ces gens-là, also sometimes called Jef
- JEF United Chiba, a Japanese professional football club

== See also ==
- Combined Joint Expeditionary Force (CJEF), a UK–French military force
