= Japan Spotlight =

Bimonthly publication

The Japan Spotlight (ISSN 1348-9216) is a bimonthly publication by the Japan Economic Foundation (JEF). It was formerly called the Journal of Japanese Trade & Industry (JTI).

== History and profile ==
The publication was established in 1982. It was originally focused on the economy of Japan but its focus was later broadened to culture, history, and international politics in addition to the economy.

The journal, when it was published as the Journal of Japanese Trade & Industry, has stated that it is independent of the Japanese government, and Malcolm Trevor, author of Japan - Restless Competitor: The Pursuit of Economic Nationalism, states that it "gives no outward sign of putting forward official views". Trevor argues that the publication is in fact connected to the Japanese government and that "it is to all intents and purposes an official organ, even if it may not look it." Trevor states that this is demonstrated in the Japan Economic Foundation's leadership roster, which included Shoichi Akazawa (赤澤 璋一 Akazawa Shōichi), Naohiro Amaya, and Minoru Masuda (益田 実 Masuda Minoru).
