= Figure skating costume =

Costume worn for figure skating

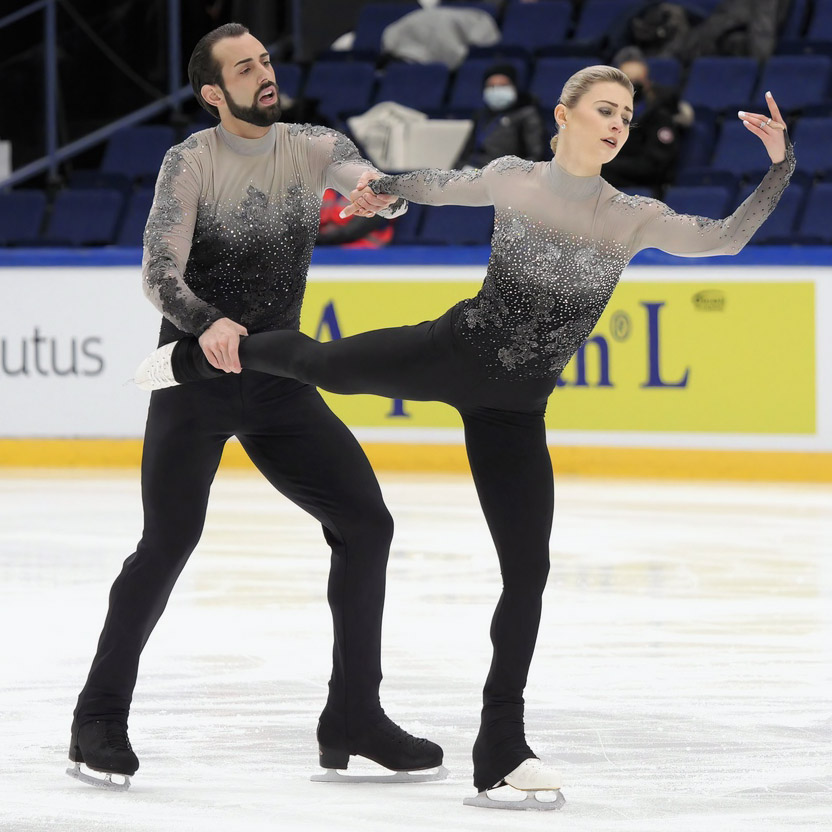
A figure skating pair (Ashley Cain/Timothy LeDuc) skating in matching costumes

A figure skating costume is clothing worn by a figure skater when performing. Skaters typically wear costumes that reflect the character or style of their program and music to enhance its theme. Costumes may be store-bought or custom-made and are made with stretch fabric that is frequently ornamented with rhinestones, sequins, and other decorative materials and techniques.

Early figure skaters wore clothing that were intended to keep them warm while skating on cold, often outdoors rinks. Over time, they began to wear clothes that diverged from everyday fashions and were easier to move in, and costumes have become more elaborate.

== History ==
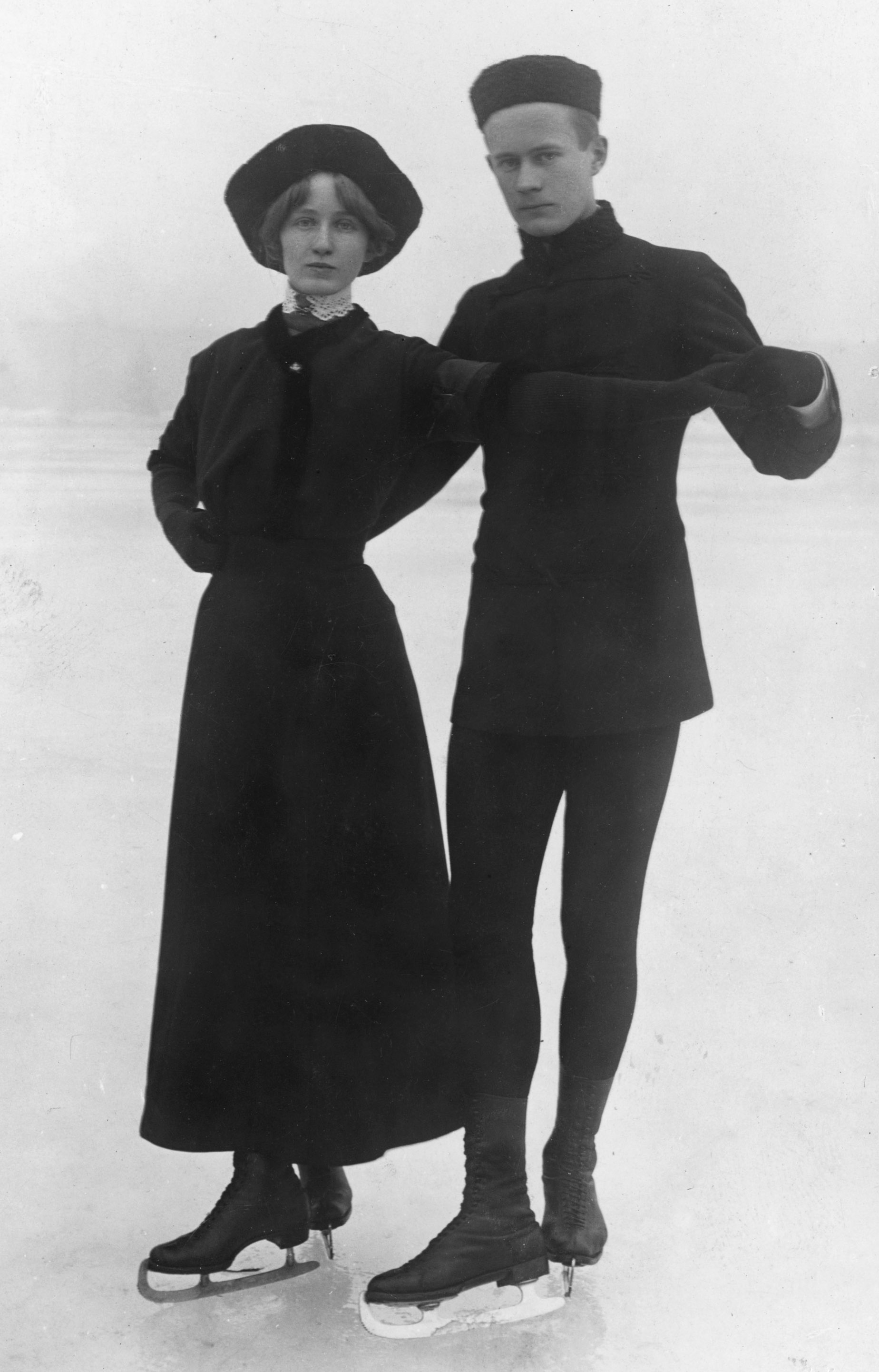
Pair skaters Helfrid and Agard Palm, about 1914, wearing typical early 20th century skating clothes

In the 19th and early 20th centuries, recreational skaters and amateur competitors wore typical winter clothing, though some clubs dictated members should wear specific styles of jackets to distinguish themselves from other skaters. Practical concerns related to clothing were often discussed in skating books, such as protection from the wind on outdoors rinks or ease of movement. Between 1850 and 1898, English men commonly skated in top hats and frock coats.

Tights started to become the standard wear for men in the 1890s because they showed the body line of the skater while allowing for freedom of movement; they were also considered to be safer than trousers, which a blade could catch on. Edgar Syers, writing on skating clothing for men in 1908, stated that "the choice of a suitable costume is somewhat difficult"; top hats and frock coats were no longer acceptable dress. His wife, Madge Syers, recommended for women a "narrow" skirt of 3.5 yards (3.2 m) of fabric and criticized the wearing of tight corsets, which prevented women from using their back muscles and made falls more dangerous. Both men and women wore hats, though when jumping became more common, decorative hats were replaced with ones that fit snugly and would not fly off.

Women began to wear shorter skirts in the 1920s and 1930s, in tandem with general fashion trends and a decrease in the age of women's skaters, for whom it was more socially acceptable to wear short dresses. Theresa Weld Blanchard wrote that a dress she had made for the 1920 Olympic Games was too revealing with a hemline six inches (15 cm) below her knees, which would show her bloomers when she jumped. By the 1930s, knee-length skirts were standard, and the lighter skirts made it easier for women to jump. This trend toward shortened skirts has sometimes been attributed to Sonja Henie, but Herma Szabo, the 1924 Winter Olympic champion, had begun wearing skirts above the knee by 1923.

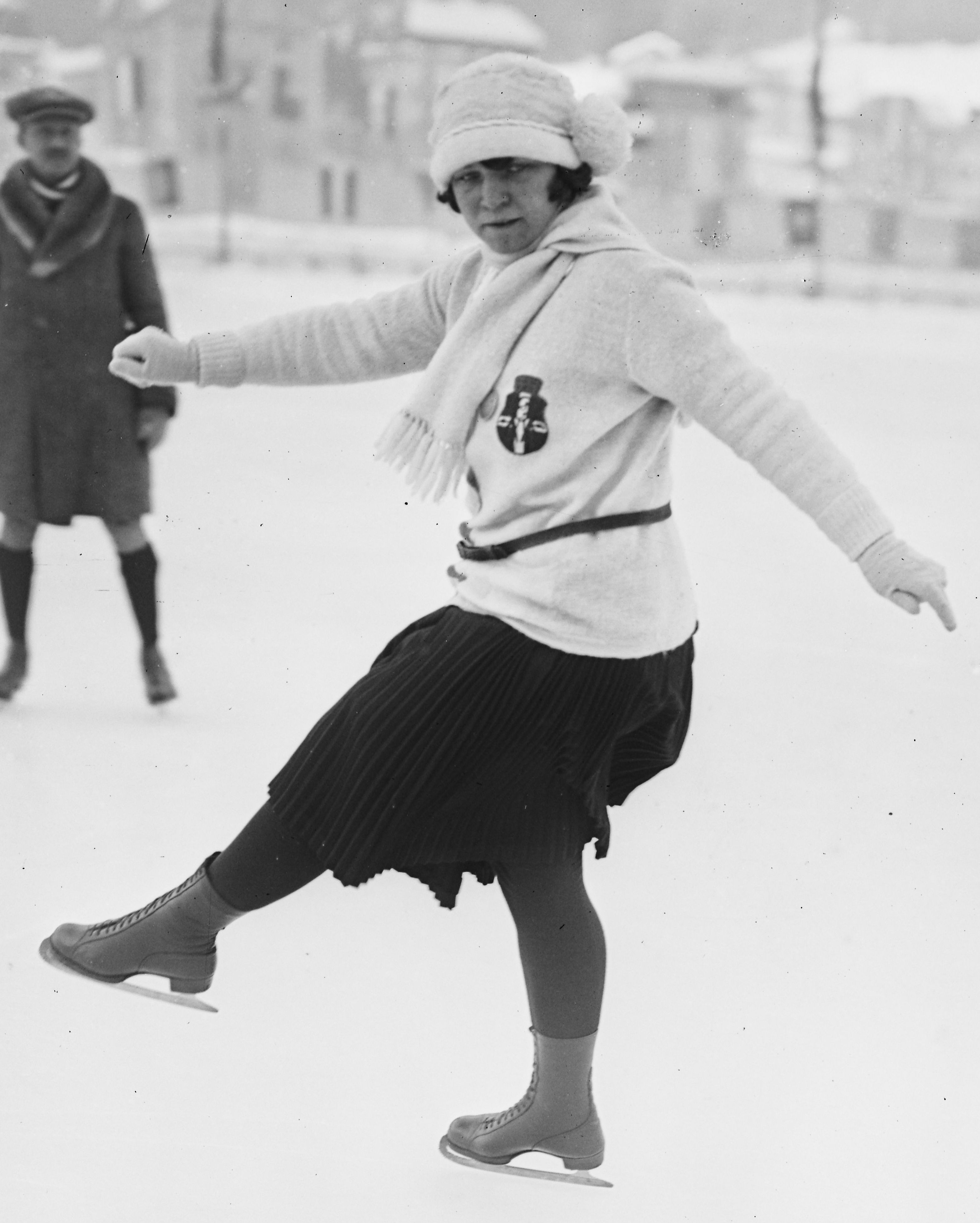
Szabo at the 1924 Winter Olympics

Maribel Vinson, in her 1938 Primer of Figure Skating, wrote that women should wear a well-fitted dress that allowed for free movement, with a full skirt, and that "this skirt is never below the kneecap". For men, she noted that trousers meant specifically for skating were available, and she recommended they practice in short knickerbockers ("never plus fours") and wear black or dark blue tights for competition. Skating magazines began to frequently describe competitors' costumes in reports from competitions and publish articles devoted to skating fashion.

Both men and women originally wore black skates. This began to change in the 1920s. Professional skater Charlotte Oelschlägel had worn white skates in her popular ice show in 1915, along with very short skirts for the time, but white skates remained wear for professionals rather than competitive amateurs. Henie is often credited with being the first to wear white boots in competition, then, after other women copied her, competing in beige skates so she would continue to stand out from her competitors. Cecil Smith, however, claimed that she was first to wear white boots in competition at the 1930 World Championships, and that Henie switched from beige to white in imitation of her. Vinson noted in 1938 that black boots were relatively rare for women. It is currently the norm for men to wear black skates and women to wear white.

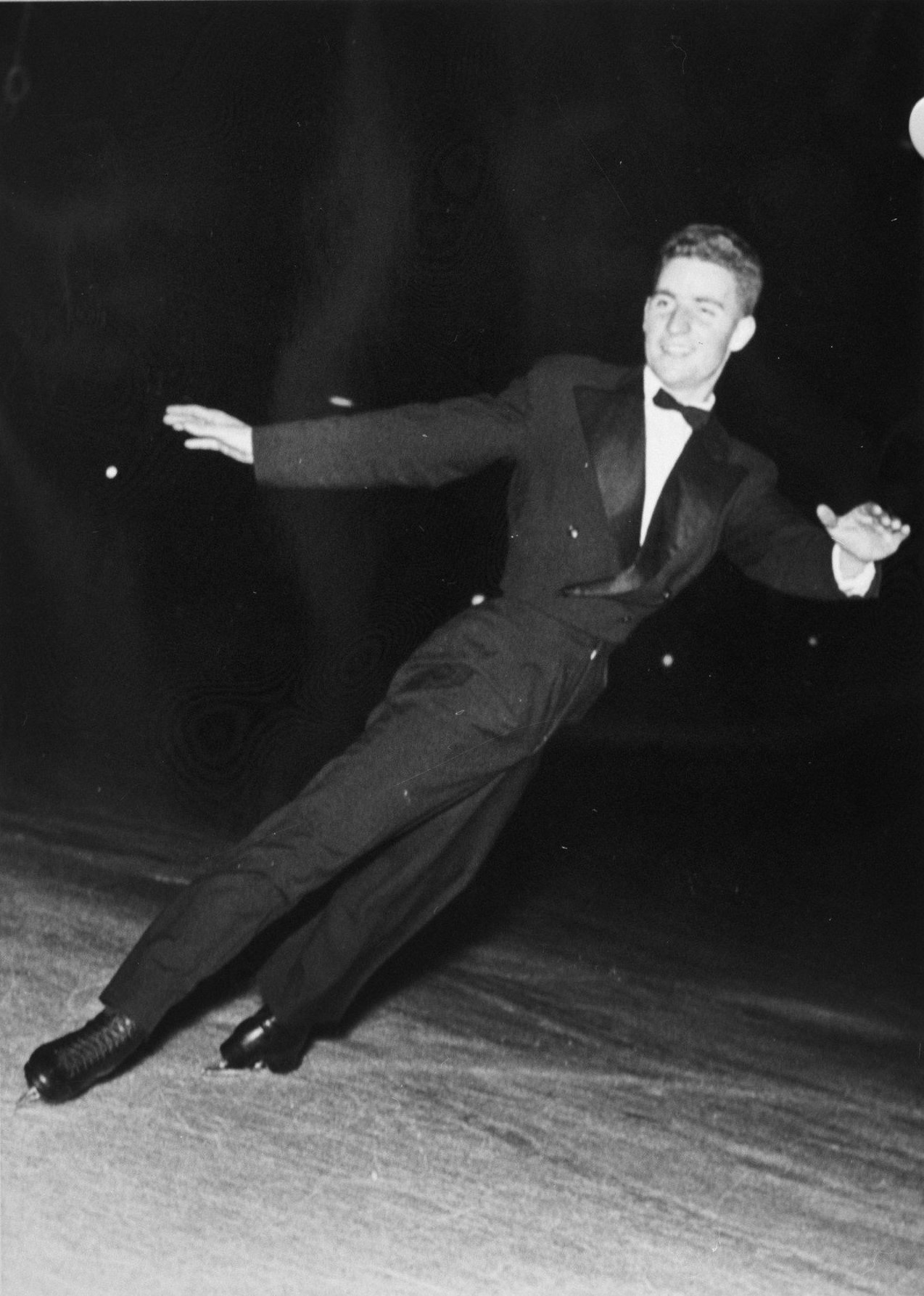
Karol Divín skating in a suit in 1960

Women's skirts shortened further over the next several decades, but their competitive costumes remained generally simple in form, with long sleeves and high necklines in the back. After the advent of color television, brighter colors and simple ornamentation became more popular. Dresses were typically made with normal dress patterns. In the 1940s, men stopped wearing tights in favor of tapered trousers; they competed in black-and-white suits or buttoned jackets and trousers. Skaters wore more revealing and colorful outfits in ice shows such as Ice Capades.

In the late 1950s and 1960s, some men began to wear colored suits, including ice dancers who wore suits the color of their partner's dress. After the 1962 World Championships, where ice dancers Eva Romanová and Pavel Roman both wore coral-colored costumes and won the World title, the International Skating Union (ISU) issued guidelines, though not rules, about costumes. The guidelines criticized "brief, flashy costumes better suited to a carnival or ice show" as well as the trend among men in pairs and ice dance to wear costumes that matched their partner's, including through the use of decorations like sequins. They asked skaters to wear "decent, dignified" outfits. Guidelines were also given for attire for judges (dark suits for men, and no trousers for women when possible). However, at the 1969 World Championships, most dance couples wore the same color.

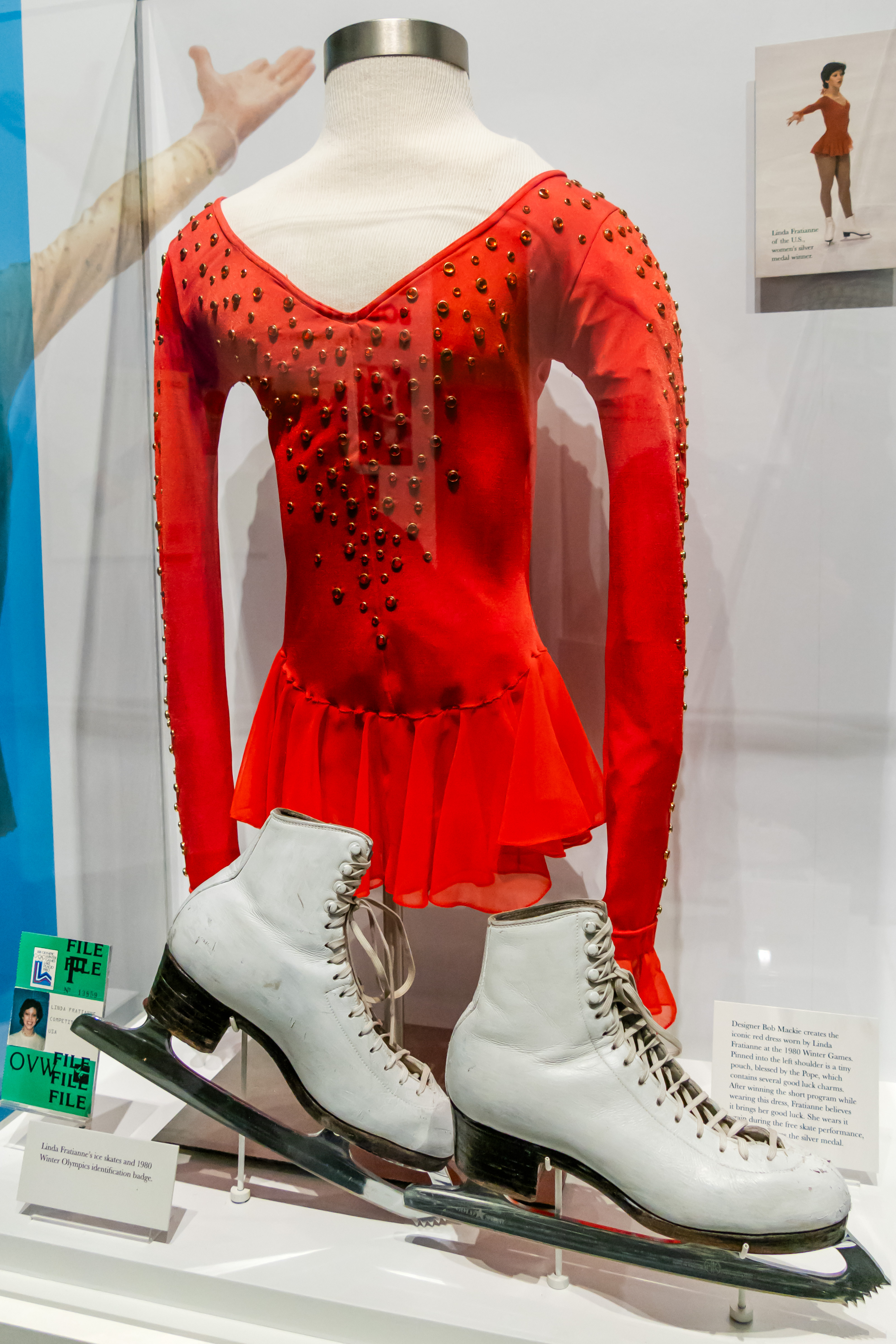
Costume worn by Fratianne at the 1980 Winter Olympics

In the 1970s and 80s, usage of specialists became more common among skaters. This included skating-specific costumers, allowing professional skating costume designers to make a living. Modern stretch fabrics became available in the 1970s, along with lightweight sequins and beads, and sleek, streamlined styles became trendy. Men began to adopt jumpsuits made of stretch fabrics and to wear more individualized costumes that matched their programs. Linda Fratianne, the 1977 and 1979 World champion, along with fashion trends like disco and glam rock, popularized more elaborate ornamentation on costumes for both men and women. Video technology had also advanced, allowing skaters to wear glittering costumes without creating glare on camera.

From the 1970s to the 1990s, men's costumes were frequently made in bright or pastel colors, and they were embellished. Men's costumes of this period often resembled attire from dance or acrobatic performances. Black was also a popular color for all costumes. In the 1980s, men's costumes generally had shirts and trousers made from the same color fabric, and for women's costumes, designers began to use nude fabric that gave the impression of bare skin.

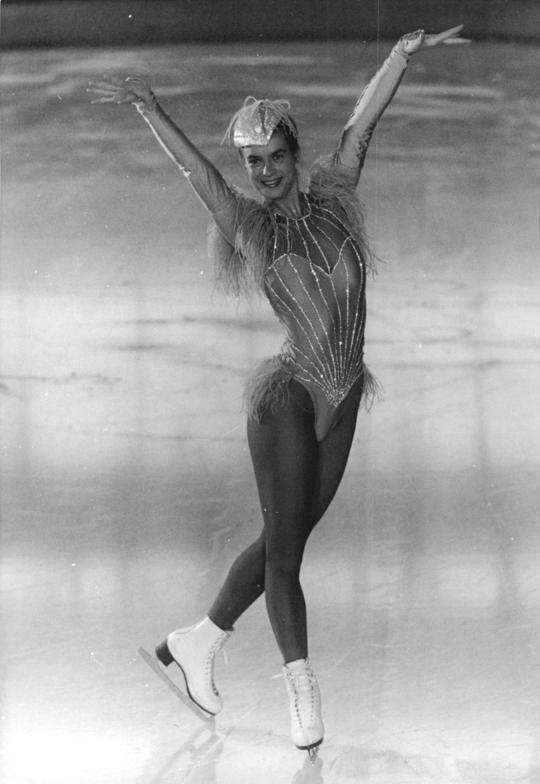
Witt's "showgirl" costume

In the 1987–1988 season, Olympic champion Katarina Witt wore a showgirl-style costume with a few feathers for a skirt. Later in the season, after criticism that her attire was too revealing, she added more feathers to further cover her hips. Debi Thomas, her strongest rival, wore a black unitard with no skirt. Ice dancer Paul Duchesnay wore a costume with no sleeves. After the season ended, in the summer of 1988, the ISU banned similar costumes to these, ruling that women were required to wear a skirt, designating areas of the body that were required to be covered on men and women, and discouraging all skaters from wearing highly decorated costumes. Judges could deduct from a skater's artistic mark for costumes that they thought were in violation of the new rules; Philippe Candeloro was given such a deduction at the 1992 World Championships for wearing a sleeveless costume.

Ice dancers in the late 1980s through early 1990s sometimes experimented with costumes such as unitards that were later forbidden by the rules. In the 1990s, some women began to wear tights that covered the boot to create a continuous line between the legs and feet, and women's costumes often used somewhat simpler designs. The ISU banned men from wearing tights in 1994.

In the early 2000s, ice dancers trended toward flowing costumes, loose hair, and especially for women, costumes relying heavily on nude mesh fabric. Beginning in 2004, women in singles and pair skating were again allowed to wear trousers or unitards, though dresses remain the norm due to longstanding tradition. In June 2022, the ISU removed the requirement for women in ice dance to wear skirts as well.

== Design ==
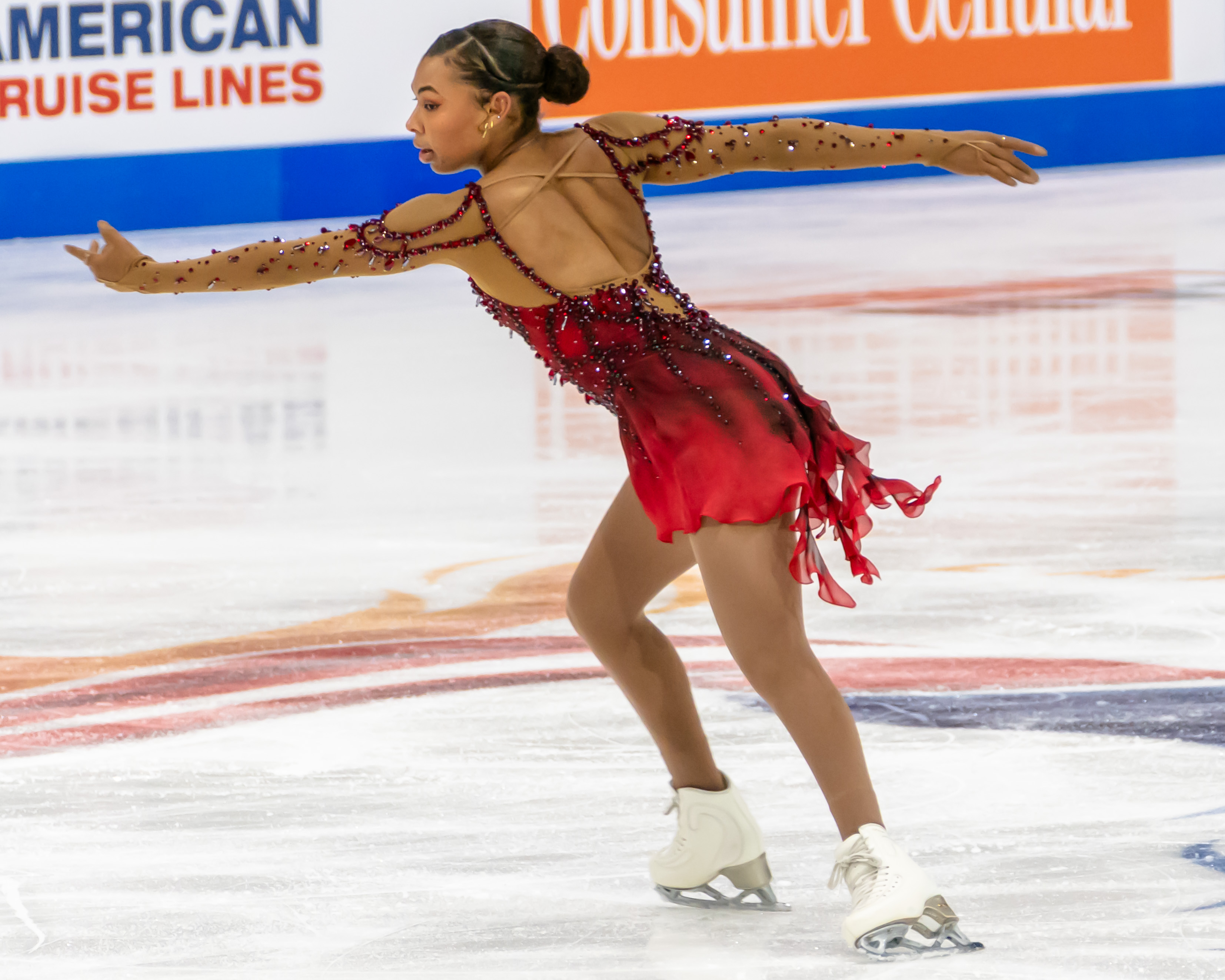
Starr Andrews competes at 2025 Skate America. Gemstones are attached to mesh dyed to match her skin tone.

ISU regulations state that costumes worn in competition "must be modest, dignified and appropriate for athletic competition – not garish or theatrical in design" and that "the clothing must not give the effect of excessive nudity inappropriate for the discipline." A one-point deduction can be taken if the majority of the judging panel agrees the costume does not follow these guidelines; however, such deductions are rare. Any decorations must be firmly attached, and a one-point penalty is incurred if part of the costume falls on the ice. Skaters wearing dresses are not required to wear tights, but they are common to help the skater stay warm and protect their legs if they fall. Synchronized skating teams may wear a mix of dresses and costumes with trousers.

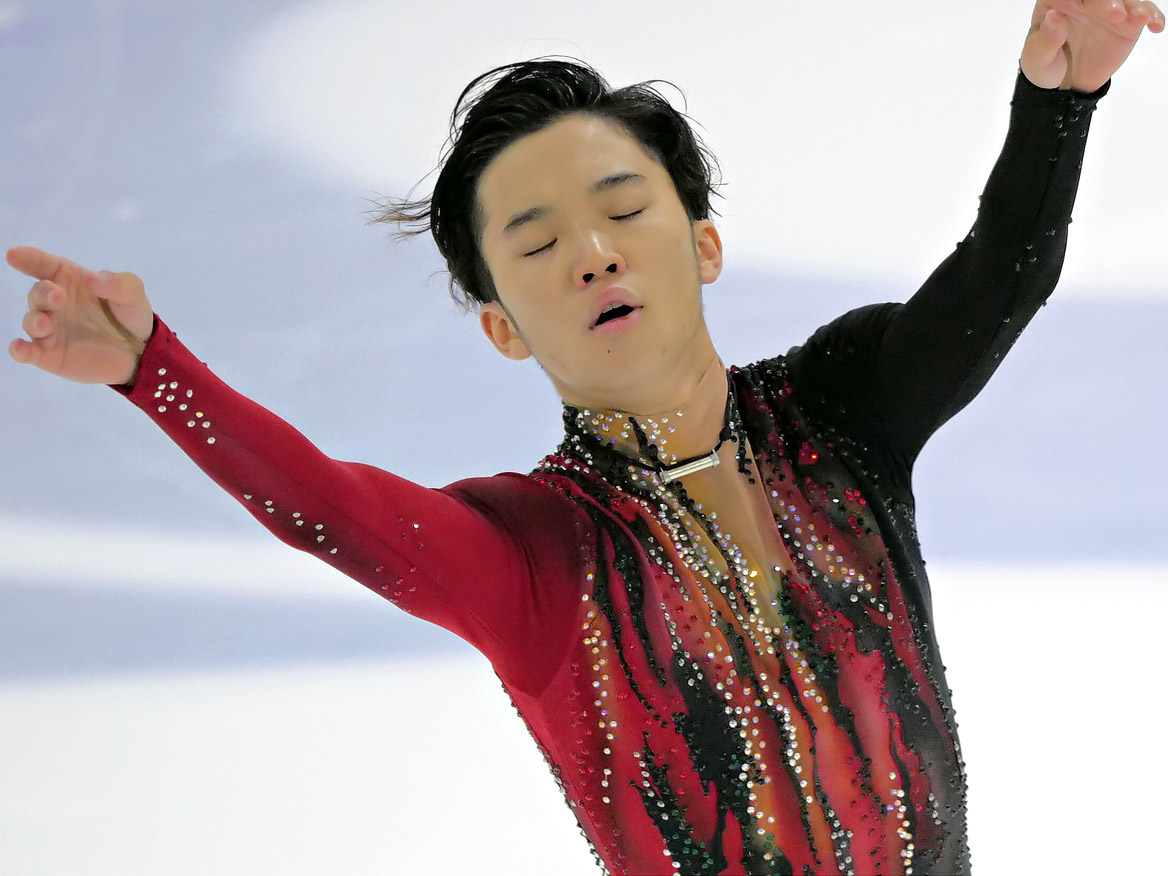
Kazuki Tomono at the 2019 Lombardia Trophy. His costume is decorated with painting and rhinestones in multiple colors, and elastics keep the sleeves in place.

Costumes must be sturdy enough to not come apart during a program, be visually pleasing to both a live audience and in photos, and fit the skater well without causing any distractions. Elastic and velcro may be used to keep long sleeves or trousers fixed in place. Beads or rhinestones must be securely fastened, as they present a danger if they fall on the ice.

The design of the costume reflects the character or the musical theme of the performance. John Misha Petkevich said that for costumes, "Harmony with the music, choreography, and dramatic intent of the program is all-important" and that it was a part of artistic presentation that "cannot be overemphasized". Designers achieve this in various ways; for example, velvet or satin may be used to emulate a ball gown, while a costume for a program set to folk music may reflect the traditional clothing of the area.

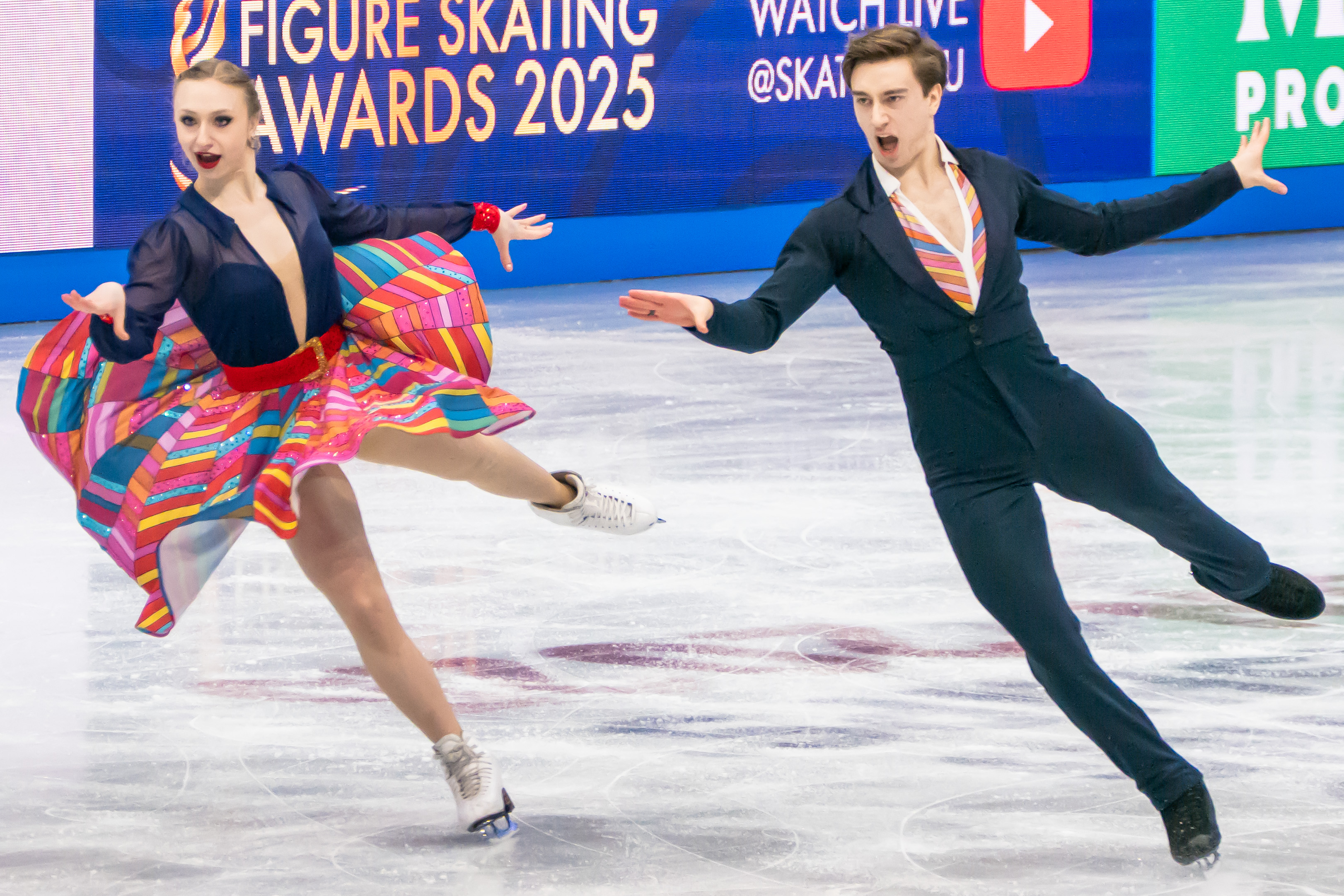
Ice dancers Kateřina Mrázková and Daniel Mrázek compete at the 2025 World Championships, with Mrázková's skirt flaring dramatically during their performance.

Costumes may be designed to highlight particular kinds of movements the skater uses during the program through techniques such as using contrasting fabrics or the positioning of decorative elements. Skirts, which often provide little coverage while the skater is in motion, as well as loose shirts, can draw the attention of viewers by moving in the air during the performance.

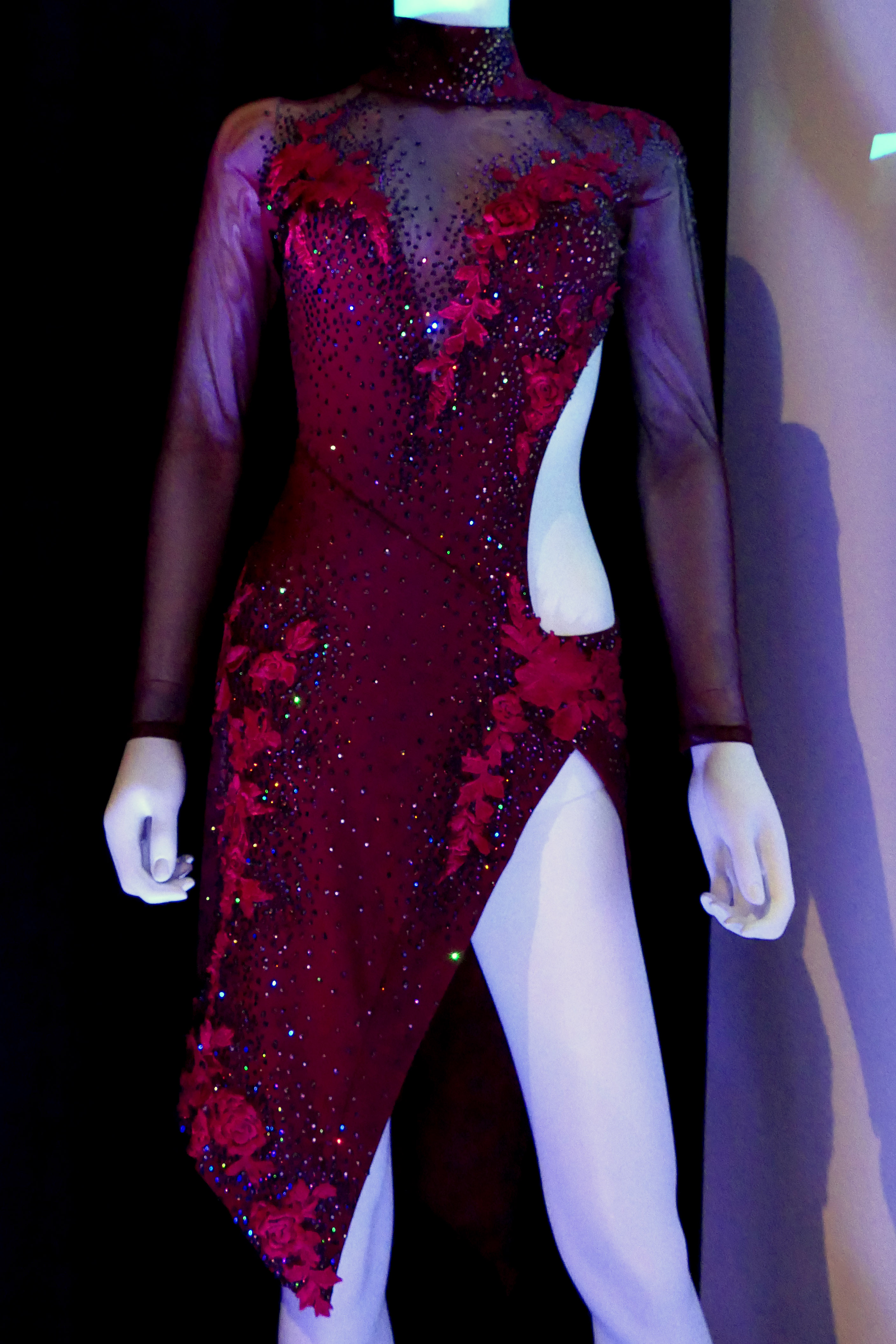
Costume worn by Tessa Virtue in the 2017–2018 season. It is made with both mesh and opaque fabric and decorated using rhinestones and lace cutouts.

Other considerations include the weight and durability of the material and how warm the costume is. Kristi Yamaguchi wanted to wear a velvet costume for the first time during her professional career, as the fabric was too hot and heavy for her to wear while competing, but different skaters have different preferences, with some preferring thicker fabrics. Women ice dancers tend to wear longer skirts because they do not perform jumps, where long skirts could slow rotation in the air. Conversely, costumes for pair skaters and ice dancers cannot use fabrics that make lifting difficult or dangerous due to being too slippery, and care must be taken to avoid decorations that could cut their partner or become caught.

Costumes may be decorated in various ways, with one common ornament being rhinestones. Thousands may be used on a single costume, each of which needs to be glued on individually; larger stones are also sewn on. Crystals can add noticeable weight, and some skaters may decide on a costume with fewer rhinestones so it can be lighter. Other decorative techniques include painting or airbrushing and printing 3D decorations onto the fabric. Both members of a pair or dance team will often wear costumes that match in fabric and decorative elements.

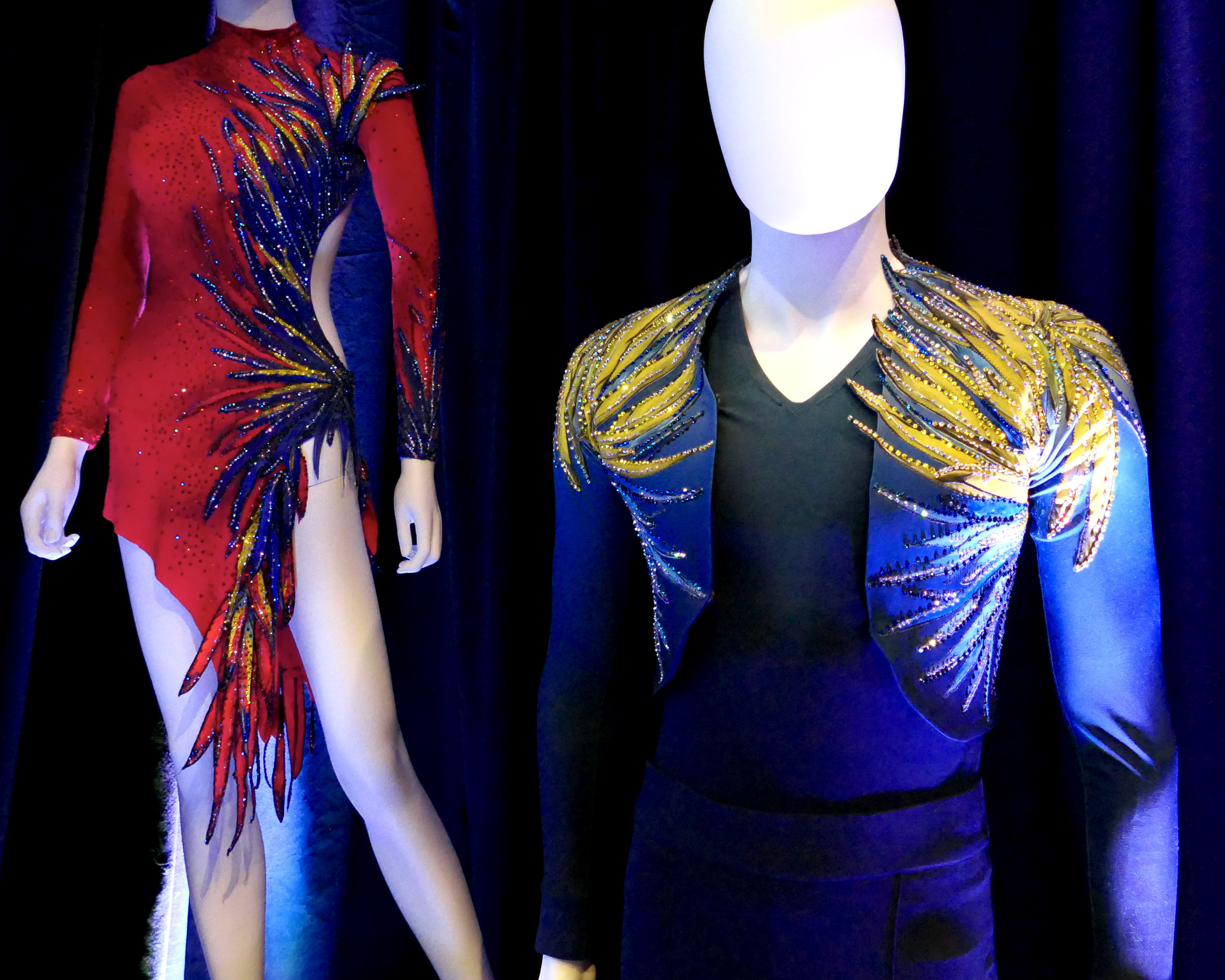
Costumes worn by ice dancers Marjorie Lajoie and Zachary Lagha in the 2021–22 season; the feather decorations were printed onto the fabric in 3D.

Skaters often collaborate with a costume designer to decide how the costume should look; other members of a skater's team, such as a coach or choreographer, may be involved as well. For high-level skaters, costumes from a professional designer cost thousands of dollars, making them a considerable expense, though in some cases, a family member creates the costume. They generally take between 70 and 100 hours to sew and decorate.

When compulsory figures were competed, outfits worn during their tracing tended to be more somber than those worn during the short program and free skating. Sweaters and gloves or mittens were common to keep the skater warm, and women often wore leggings rather than sheer tights.

Notable designers of figure skating costume include Vera Wang, who designed costumes for Olympic medalists Michelle Kwan, Nancy Kerrigan, Nathan Chen, and Evan Lyacek; Jef Billings, who worked with Olympians Sarah Hughes and Jeffrey Buttle and created costumes for Stars on Ice for three decades; and Satomi Ito, who has created costumes for a number of skaters and is especially known for her long-time collaboration with two-time Olympic champion Yuzuru Hanyu. Other designers who have worked with many top skaters include Lisa McKinnon and Mathieu Caron.

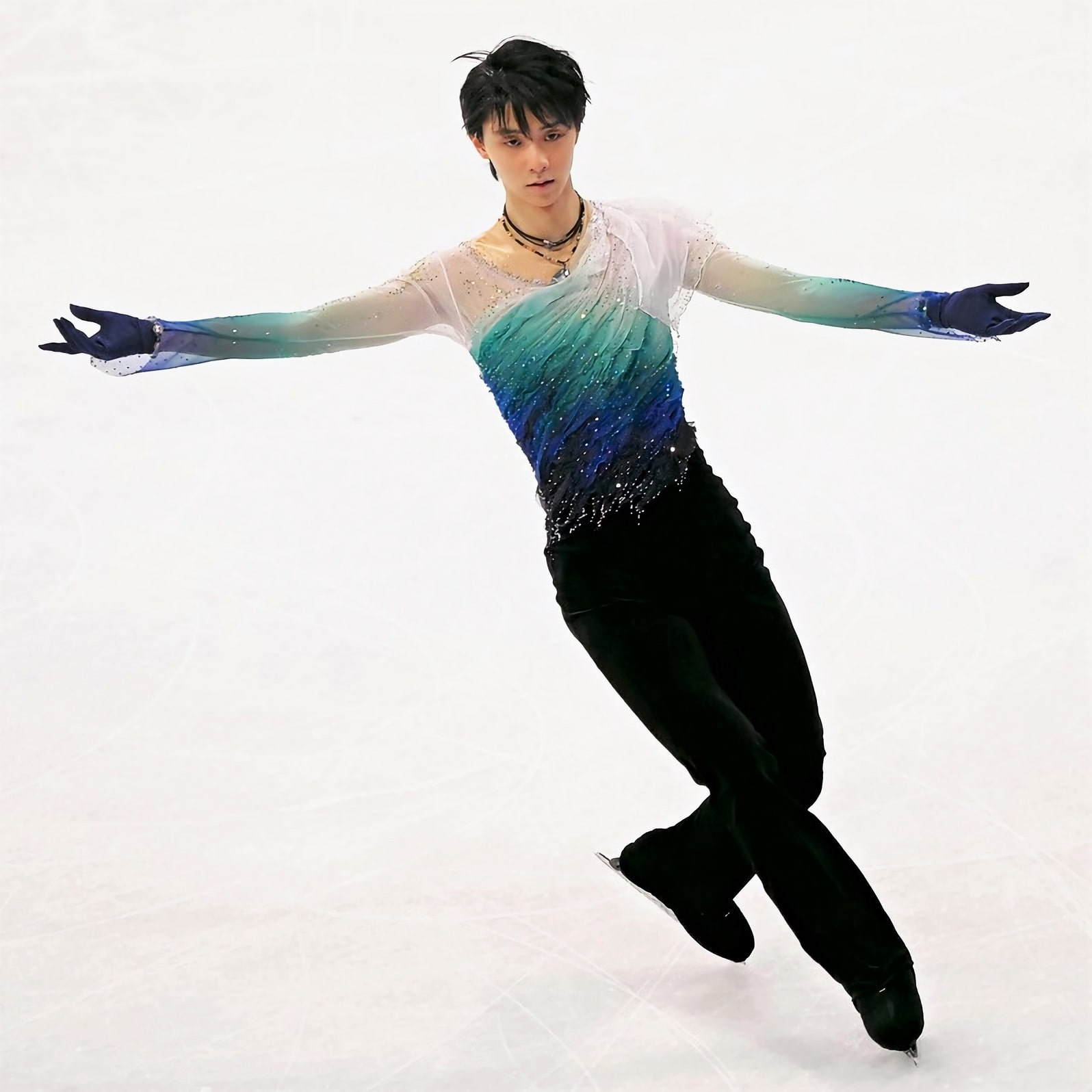
Hanyu at the 2017 World Championships in a costume created by Ito. The costume uses color gradations and draping in addition to rhinestones.

=== Cultural aspects ===
No specific rules guided costumes until 1988. The 1988 ruling requiring women to wear skirts was known as the "Katarina rule", though it also banned other costumes like that worn by Debi Thomas. Its discouraging of more elaborate decoration was controversial. While ISU representative Franklin S. Nelson explained the rule by saying that some costumes were "felt to be more appropriate for Las Vegas or the circus than for competitive figure skating", younger skaters who liked spangled costumes complained. The ruling on skirts was not changed until 2004.

Later controversies have arisen over costumes seen as culturally offensive, such as Russian ice dancers Oksana Domnina and Maxim Shabalin skating a program based on Aboriginal Australian culture while wearing bodysuits with white markings and brown makeup, which Aboriginal activists called inauthentic and exploitative of their culture. Skaters such as Anton Shulepov, Tatiana Navka, and Andrey Burkovsky have been criticized for skating Holocaust-themed programs in costumes based on Nazi concentration camp uniforms.

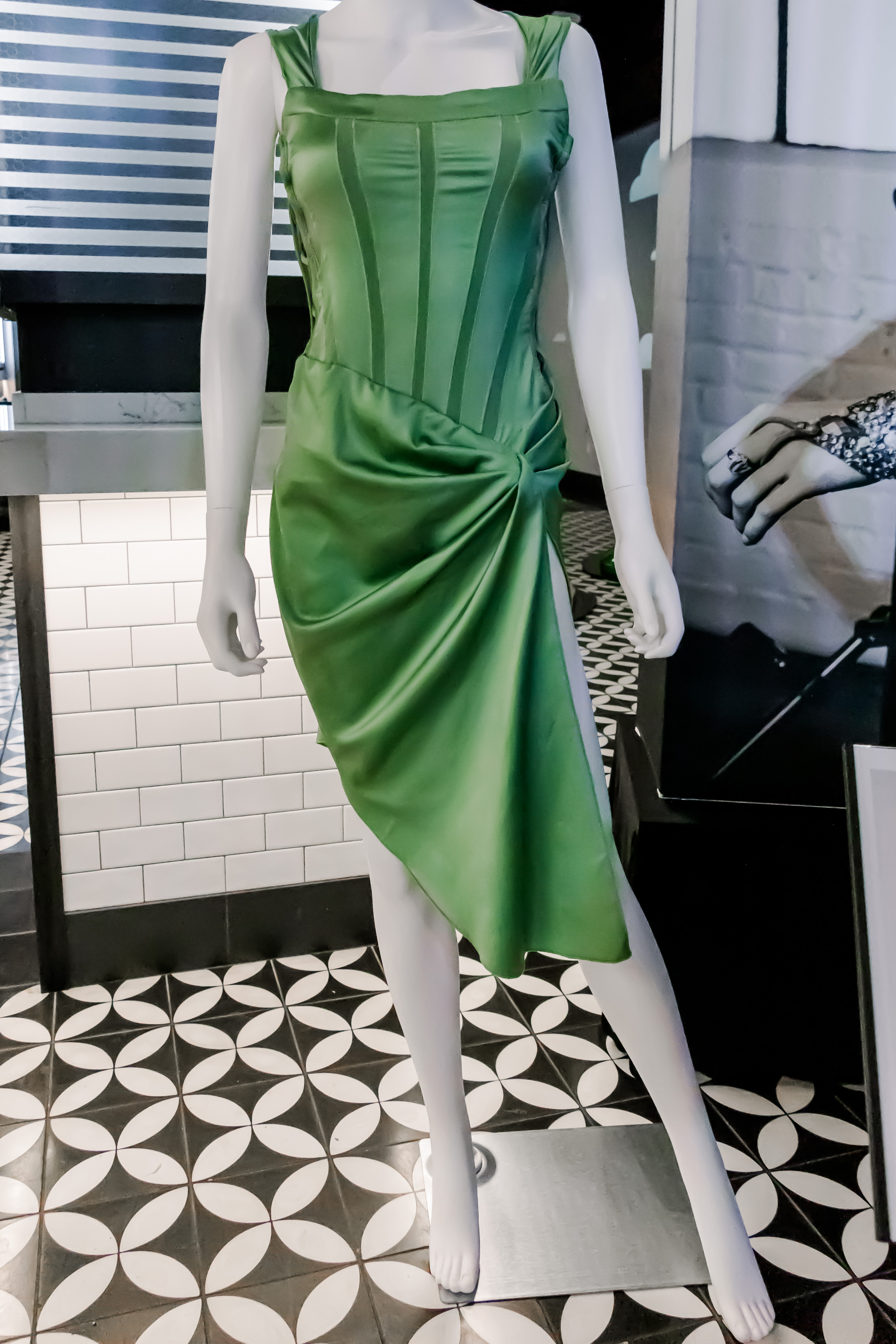
Costume worn by Olivia Smart in the 2021–2022 season, which uses fabric selection and draping for visual effect

Ellyn Kestnbaum has argued that the skater's costume and general appearance are seen as reflecting not only the character of the program being skated but the skater as well. She gives examples such as neat buns or short hair for women skaters giving a more formal and mature appearance, and long or facial hair worn by men (both outside of the traditional norms of figure skating) as suggesting a rebellious personality. Figure skating's reliance on individual costumes rather than uniforms has been criticized for reasons such as disadvantaging skaters who cannot afford expensive costumes; however, when American skaters at the 2014 Winter Olympics were asked about the idea of competing without costumes, they responded negatively.

Gendered aspects of costuming have frequently caused tension in the sport. Men's and women's costumes are generally sharply differentiated from each other; Mary Louise Adams, a professor of kinesiology, wrote that women's costumes are "unlikely to provoke thoughts of power or athletic prowess". Kestnbaum noted that regulations and culture at the time she was writing (2003) encouraged women to skate in bare legs or flesh-colored tights and low-cut dresses; while long sleeves or high necklines were still common, opaque leggings or tights were rare, with occasional exceptions in pair skating costumes to make both members to match more closely. On the other hand, regulations at the time forbid men from wearing costumes that showed their chests or the outlines of their legs. Adams argued that the rules "legislated not just gender difference but gender inequality." Tights continue to be banned for men, who are required to wear trousers.

In North America, the fact that skaters perform to music and wear costumes means that it is perceived as more feminine than other sports, despite originally having been perceived as a sport for men. Media has frequently discussed the masculinity of men's skating and in particular their costumes.

Alan Zell, a US Figure Skating official and vice-chair of its public relations committee, critiqued men's costumes in 1970 for looking too neat even after a skater had finished his program, saying that it "might give us a better sports image if they'd allow for a shirt tail to stick out near the end of a program". In a 1983 interview, World champion Scott Hamilton, while discussing his decision not to wear costumes with sequins, emphasized that skating should be seen as athletic. US Figure Skating president Hugh Graham supported the 1988 rules discouraging extravagant costumes, as he thought they drew the image of figure skating away from that of being a sport and discouraged boys from joining; he also wanted to enact other changes, such as no longer presenting men with flowers during victory ceremonies. In the 1990s, the costumes of North American men often evoked traditionally masculine images such as soldiers and kings.

As with other types of clothing, trends and cultural ideals in costumes vary between cultures. Kestnbaum and Sandra Bezic observed that Russian and Ukrainian men in the late 1990s and early 2000s often preferred more decorated and theatrical costumes compared to men from the United States and Canada. Bezic described how these costumes could be seen differently in different cultures: "what is accepted in the Ukraine as theatrical may be interpreted as comical or effeminate by North American audience". Kerry Lauerman, when discussing the 2002 Winter Olympics figure skating scandal and critiquing what he saw as a vague definition of artistry in the sport, noted that Canadian fans praised the simpler costumes of the Canadian pair in the controversy and disdained the more dramatic ones of the Russian pair. In Kestnbaum's view, in Russia, elaborate costumes and imagery were related less to gendered ideals and more to neo-romantic or surrealistic ideas and images of extravagance rather than austerity,and Bezic said that while Russian skaters were inspired by the opulence of ballet, American skaters might be inspired instead by the traditions of Las Vegas ice shows.
