= Jef =

Jef is a Dutch-language masculine given name primarily used in Belgium. It is a short form of Jozef/Josef, used also in Breton. People with the name include:

- Jef Billings (1945–2016), American figure skating costume designer
- Jef Boeke (born 1954), American geneticist
- Jef Bruyninckx (1919–1995), Belgian film actor, editor and director
- Jef Caers (born 1970s), Belgian geostatistician
- Jef Colruyt (born 1958), Belgian businessman
- Jef Delen (born 1976), Belgian footballer
- Jef Demuysere (1907–1969), Belgian cyclist
- Jef Denyn (1862–1941), Belgian carillon player
- Jef Dutilleux (1876–1960), Belgian painter
- Jef Elbers (born 1947), Belgian singer, script writer, and political activist
- Jef François (1901–1996), Belgian Nazi collaborator
- Jef Gaitan (born 1986), Filipino actress
- Jef Geeraerts (1930–2015), Belgian writer
- Jef Geys (1934-2018), Belgian artist
- Jef Gilson (1926–2012), French pianist, arranger, composer and big band leader
- Jef Jurion (born 1937), Belgian footballer
- Jef Labes, American keyboardist
- Jef Lahaye (1932–1990), Dutch cyclist
- Jef Lambeaux (1852–1908), Belgian sculptor
- Jef Last (1898–1972), Dutch poet, writer, translator and cosmopolitan
- Jef Lataster (1922–2014), Dutch long-distance runner
- Jef Leempoels (1867–1935), Belgian painter
- Jef Lowagie (1903–1985), Belgian cyclist
- Jef Maes (1905–1996), Belgian composer and violist
- Jef Mallett (born 1962), American comics artist
- Jef Martens (born 1975), Belgian DJ known as "Basto"
- Jef McAllister (born 1956), American journalist, author and lawyer
- Jef Mermans (1922–1996), Belgian footballer
- Jef Murray (1960–2015), American fantasy artist and author
- Jef Neve (born 1977), Belgian pianist and composer
- Jef Nys (1927–2009), Belgian comic book creator
- Jef Planckaert (1934–2007), Belgian cyclist
- Jef Raskin (1943–2005), American human–computer interface expert
- Jef Scherens (1909–1986), Belgian cyclist
- Jef Tavernier (born 1951), Belgian politician
- Jef Valkeniers (born 1932), Belgian physician-neuropsychiatrist and politician
- Jef Van Campen (born 1934), Belgian post-impressionistic painter
- Jef Van Damme (born 1979), Belgian politician
- Jef van de Wiele (1903–1979), Belgian Nazi politician
- Jef Van Der Linden (1927–2008), Belgian footballer
- Jef Van der Veken (1872–1964), Belgian art restorer, copyist and art forger
- Jef Van Gool (1935–2022), Belgian footballer
- Jef van Hoof (1886–1959), Belgian composer and conductor
- Jef Van Meirhaeghe (born 1992), Belgian cyclist
- Jef Vliers (1932–1995), Belgian footballer

== Breton short name ==
- Jef Le Penven (1919–1967), Breton composer
- Jef Aérosol (born in 1957), Breton graffiti artist

== See also ==
- Jeff
