= Lisa McKinnon =

Figure skating costume designer

Lisa McKinnon is a Swedish costume designer and former figure skater who specializes in creating figure skating costumes. She is most notable for her design and creation work with American figure skaters. Her work is also popular internationally, and many of her costumes have been worn at the Olympic Games. Before becoming a full-time costume designer, she worked in ice shows and show production.

== Early life ==
McKinnon is from Mariestad, Sweden. She began skating at age 4 and competed for Sweden. She started sewing her own costumes and practice wear around age 10–12, and she recalled a competition at age 15 as the moment she began to attract attention for her designs.

After graduating from high school, she worked in ice shows in Europe and North America for 16 years, eventually becoming performance director. During this time, she continued to make costumes, and she spent her summer breaks from shows in the United States. After retiring from shows, she moved there, first to Las Vegas and then Los Angeles.

== Designing career ==
McKinnon began creating costumes for other skaters as a teenager. At age 16, she designed a dress for a Swedish national champion with whom she shared a coach. She joined the costume department for Cirque du Soleil and also worked in theater; in 2013, she worked as the costume supervisor for the Wallis Annenberg Center for the Performing Arts.

After designing a skating costume for a student coached by a friend, McKinnon began to receive requests to create more costumes. Seeing the demand, she started her own costume design company, based out of Los Angeles, in 2014. She employs several additional seamstresses, typically between two and five people, depending on their availability. She has expressed an interest in expanding from figure skating costumes to bridal and evening wear, citing inspiration from Vera Wang. In 2025, according to McKinnon, she and her team made 589 costumes, including those for synchronized skating teams.

She was a long-time collaborator with World silver medalist Ashley Wagner and also worked with 2022 Olympic team event gold medalist Karen Chen. In 2017, both skaters wore McKinnon's designs on the U.S. Championships podium; she said, "I drank a lot of champagne and I definitely shed some tears" on seeing this moment on television. She has also said these early collaborations drew notice to her work. McKinnon has collaborated with Starr Andrews for many years as well.

Four years after beginning her company, 16 of her costumes were worn at the 2018 Winter Olympics. At the 2026 Winter Olympics, around 80% of the competitors wore costumes by one of three designers, including McKinnon; every member of the American and South Korean women's teams wore a costume she designed. She created the dress worn by 2026 Olympic gold medalist Alysa Liu in her winning free skate and said, "It feels incredible to be a small part of the history that Alysa has made now."

=== Design process ===
McKinnon typically begins a collaboration by asking about the skater's program, including the style and whether it has a message, then listens to their music while creating a design sketch. In some cases, skaters and choreographers may bring their own ideas for their design to the collaboration, or skaters may want to elicit feedback on her design from coaches, judges, and others they work with. During the design process, she may also watch footage of the skater on the ice. She sends a single sketch rather than presenting multiple options, though that design may be revised after feedback from her client. McKinnon has noted that "it's a lot of pressure" to design unique costumes for multiple skaters that reflect their own styles. She primarily works with clients remotely rather than having in-person fittings.

When skin-tone fabric is involved in the design, McKinnon matches the mesh to the skater's skin color. If the skater wants hair accessories or gloves, she creates those as well. She attributes advances in figure skating costume design to the wider availability of stretch materials, not only for fabric but for decorative elements, and the ability to search for a wide variety of materials on the internet. However, she primarily sources her fabric from the Los Angeles Fashion District.

== List of collaborations ==
Selection of costumes designed by McKinnon

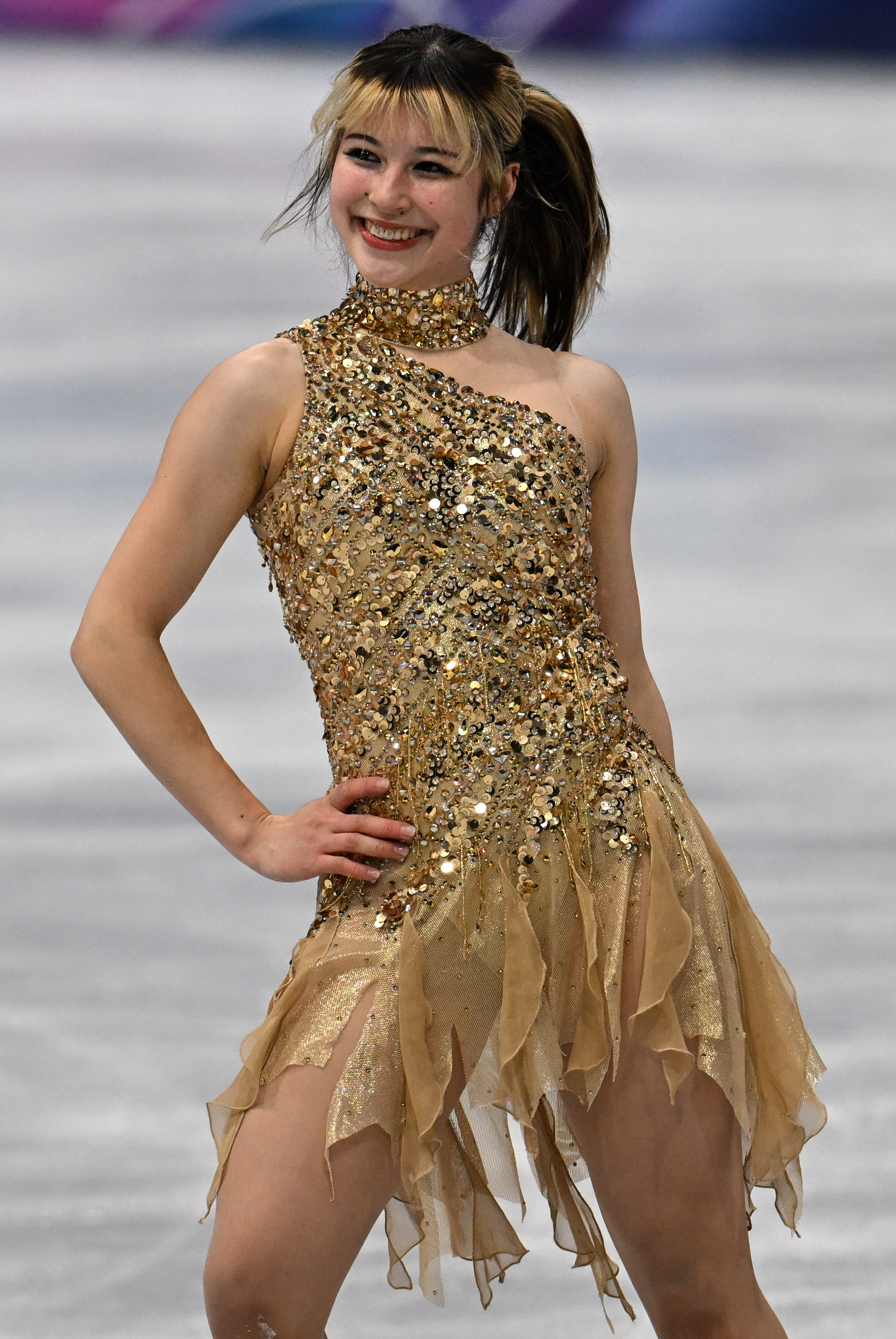
Alysa Liu (2025–2026 free skate)

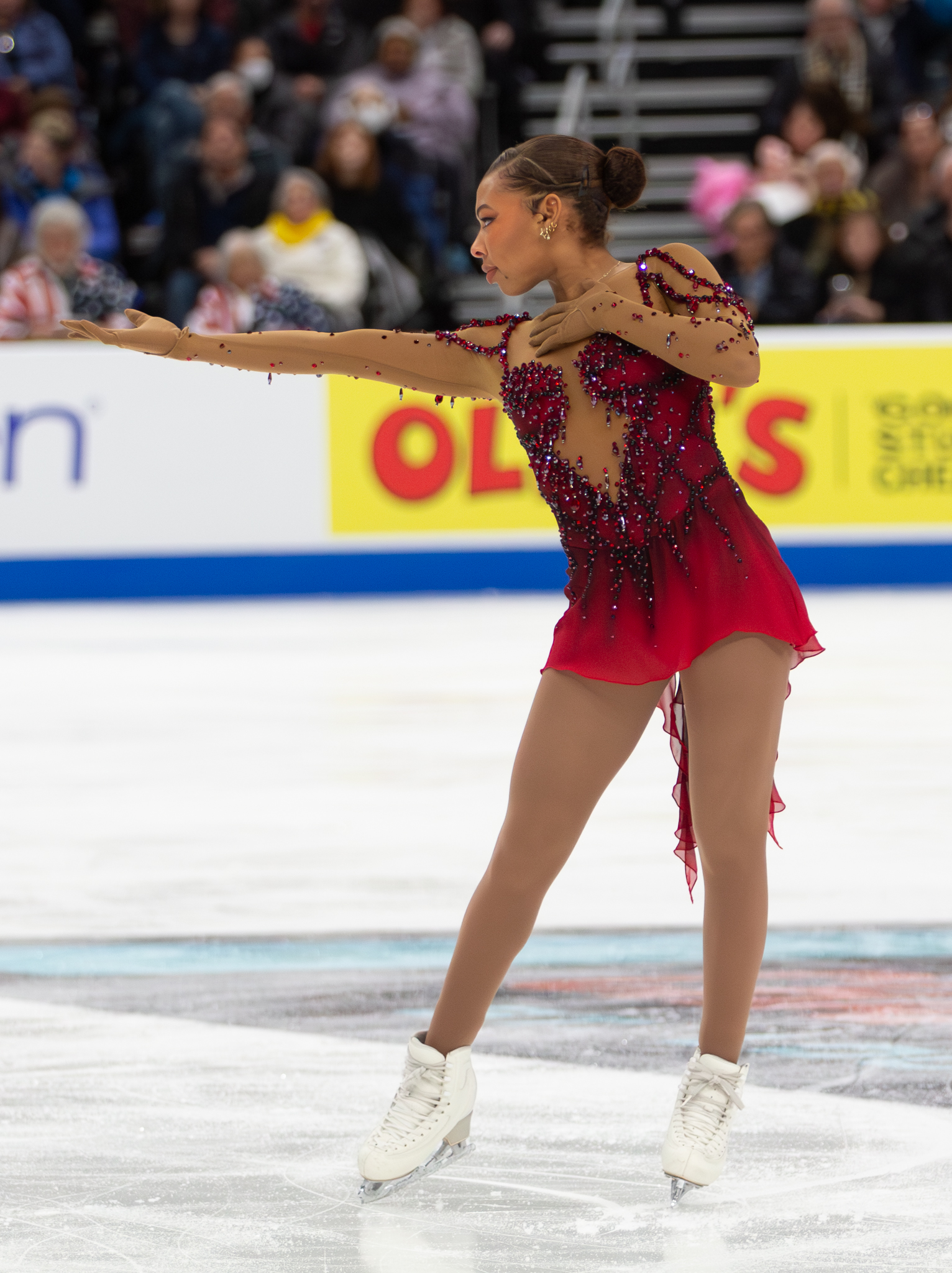
Starr Andrews (2025–2026 free skate)

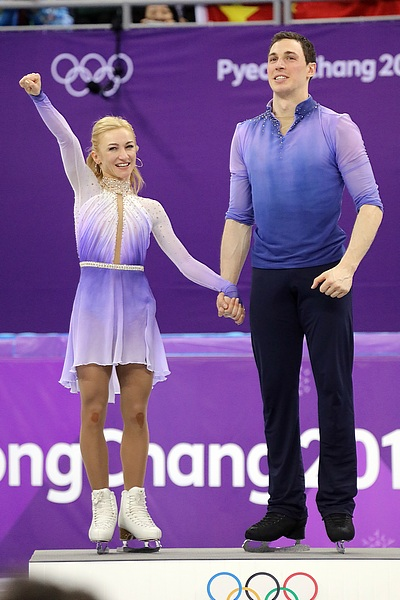
Aljona Savchenko/Bruno Massot (2017–2018 free skate)

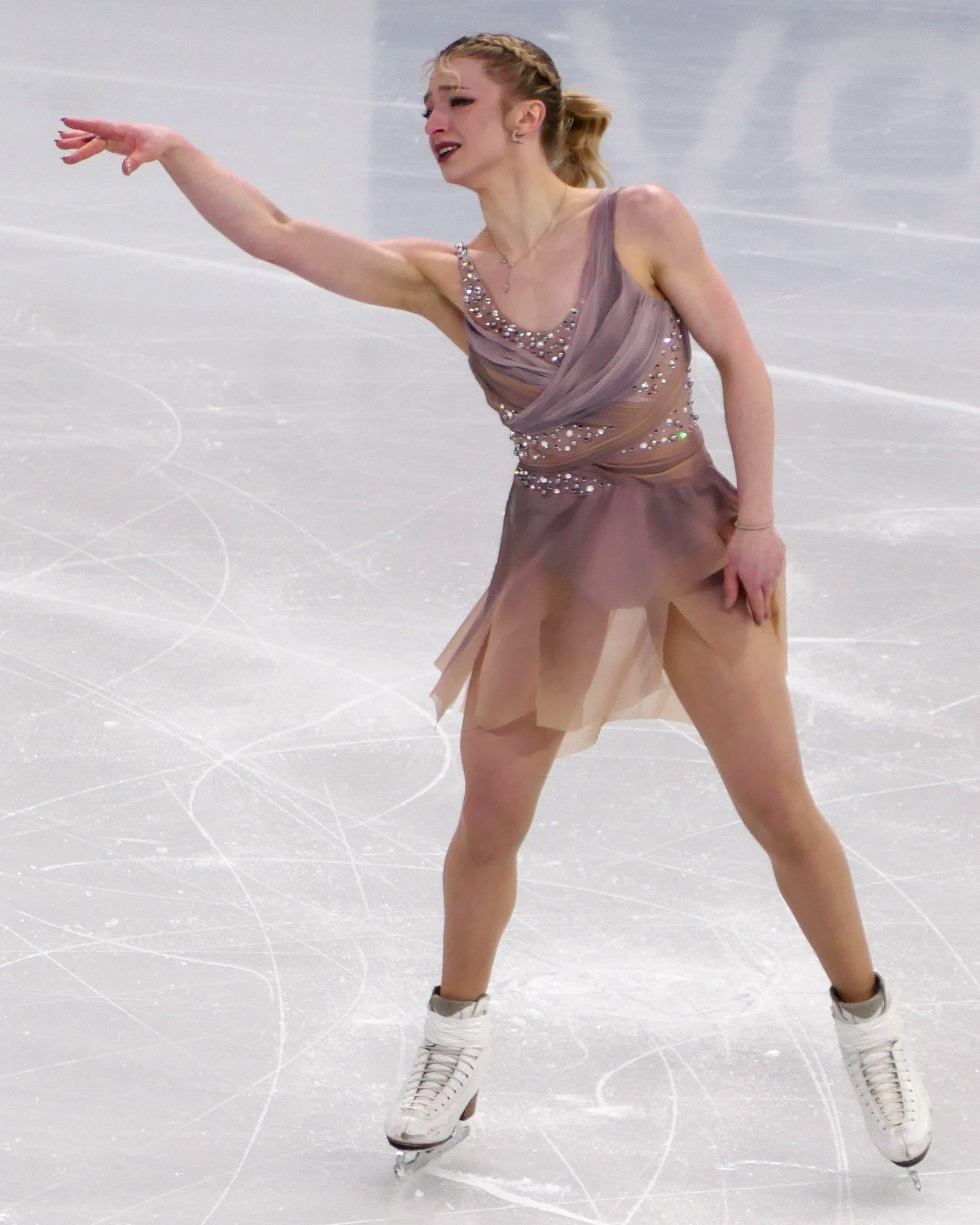
Amber Glenn (2023–2024 free skate)

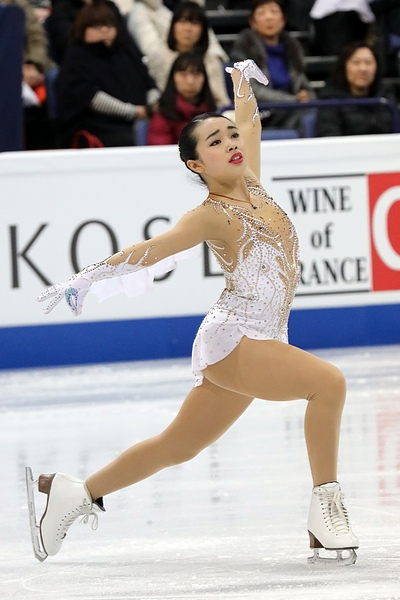
Karen Chen (2016–2017 short program)

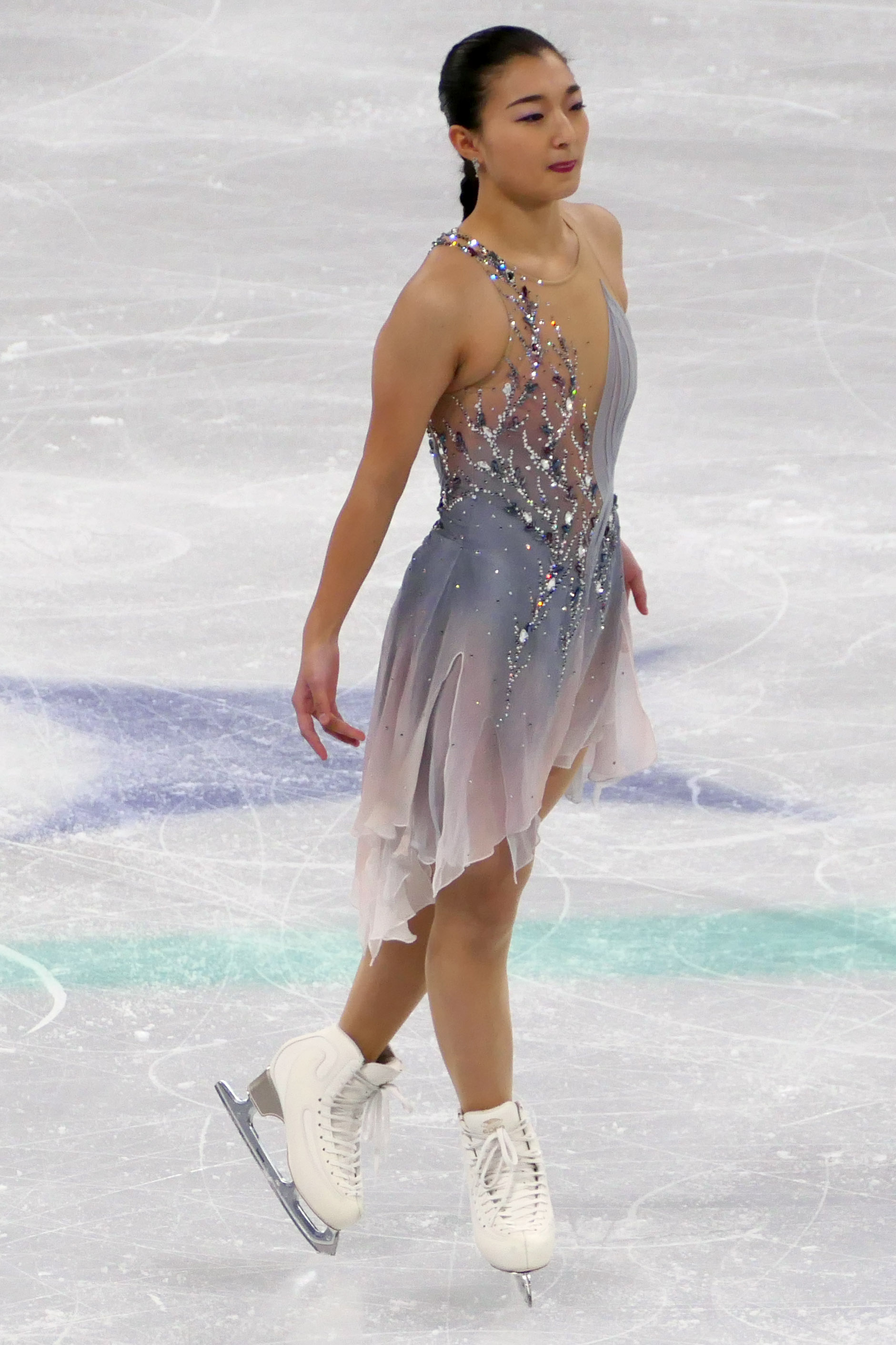
Kaori Sakamoto (2023–2024 short program)

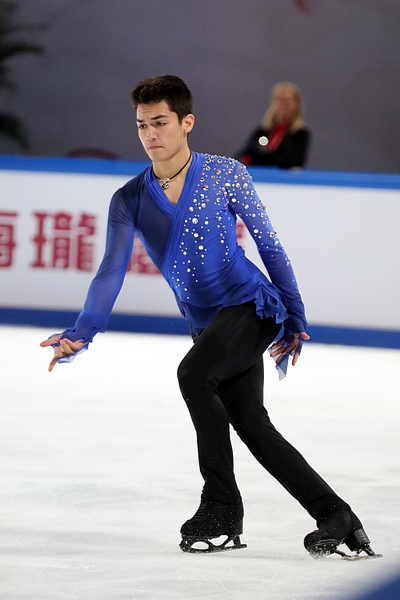
Camden Pulkinen (2019–2020 free skate)

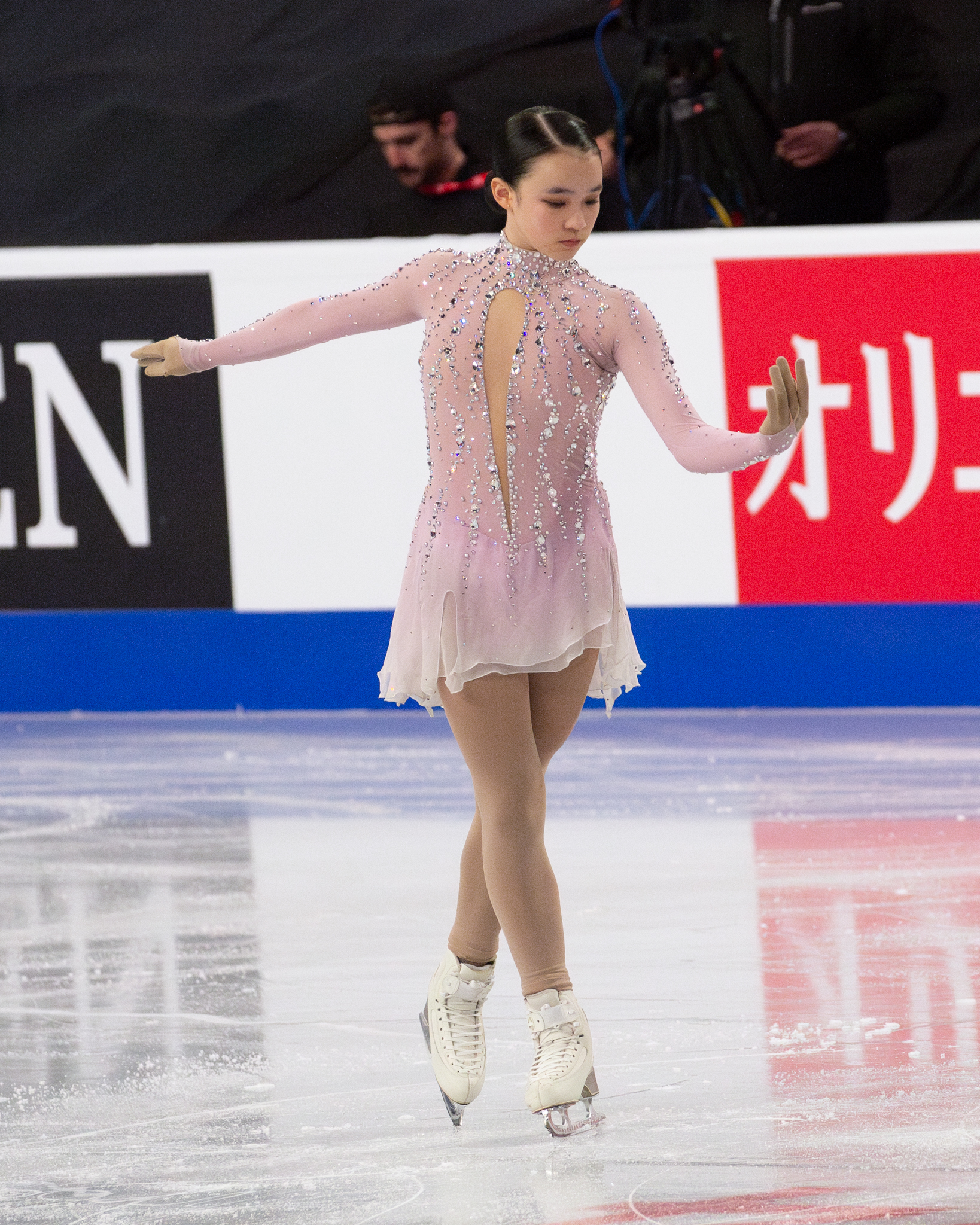
Elyce Lin-Gracey (2024–2025 short program)

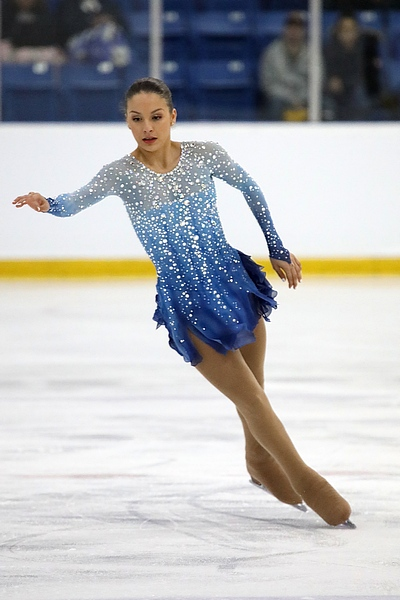
Andrea Montesinos Cantú (2018–2019 free skate)
- Starr Andrews
- Mariah Bell
- Jessica Calalang/Brian Johnson
- Christina Carreira/Anthony Ponomarenko
- Karen Chen
- Sarah Everhardt
- Misha Ge
- Amber Glenn
- Alexa Knierim/Chris Knierim
- Lee Hae-in
- Josephine Lee
- Isabeau Levito
- Elyce Lin-Gracey
- Alysa Liu
- Andrea Montesinos Cantú
- Camden Pulkinen
- Kaori Sakamoto
- Aljona Savchenko/Bruno Massot
- Maia Shibutani
- Shin Ji-a
- Ashley Wagner
- Vincent Zhou
- Zhu Yi
- Ava Marie Ziegler
