= Jeff Curran (footballer) =

Scottish-born Australian soccer player

Personal information
- Full name: Jeffery Curran
- Date of birth: 15 April 1961 (age 65)
- Place of birth: Glasgow, Scotland
- Position: Defender

Youth career
- 1976–19xx: Celtic F.C.

Senior career*
Years	Team	Apps	(Gls)
1979–1982	St Mirren F.C.	12	(0)
1982–1983	Stirling Albion F.C.	1	(0)
1983–1985	Pollok F.C.		
1985–1987	Arbroath F.C.	38	(5)
1987–1991	Floreat Athena FC		
1991	Martini		
1991–1994	Sarawak FA	52	(8)

International career
	Western Australia	3	(0)
- * Club domestic league appearances and goals

Jeff Curran (born 15 April 1961 in Glasgow, Scotland) is a Scottish-born Australian former soccer player. His son Luke has trained with Sarawak FA in spring 2017, but the transfer never happened because the Sarawak immigration law reads that in order to be recognized as a local player, they would need at least one parent from Sarawak.

== Career ==
=== Australia ===
Playing for a host of clubs in his native Scotland, Curran then relocated to Australia where he plied his trade for Floreat Athena, staying there for 4 years. Earning a reputation as one of the best defenders there with his performances, he won numerous awards with the club, including two Player of the Year awards in 1988 and 1989. Besides this, the Australian lifted three D'Orsogna Cup titles and one league championship with the club, gaining three appearances for the Western Australia state soccer team as well.

=== Sarawak ===
Brought in by coach Alan Vest together with two Australians to bolster Sarawak FA in 1991, Curran won several trophies with the club, playing for Hong Kong Martini just before his Malaysian move.

Working as a police officer for the Police Service of Scotland in Glasgow, the former defender enjoyed Sarawak due to its natural beauty and the gregariousness of the people there

== Personal life ==
Has a wife and two children named Jade and Luke. Jade now has a son named James.
