= Naohiro Amaya =

Japanese politician (1925–1994)

Naohiro Amaya (天谷 直弘, Amaya Naohiro, 31 August 1925 – 30 August 1994) was a Japanese official who served as deputy minister for international affairs at the Ministry of International Trade and Industry from 1979 to 1981.

He graduated from the University of Tokyo in 1948 after taking politics courses. From 1948 to 1981 Amaya worked for the MITI. He served as the deputy minister from 1979 to 1981. Andrew Pollack of The New York Times stated that Amaya "was particularly noted for" his development of the MITI vision in moving Japanese industry from heavy industry to electronics and knowledge-oriented industries. Pollack added that Amaya "was instrumental in drawing up plans by which the Government aided the development of Japanese industry." In 1979, in order to resolve a trade dispute with the U.S. government, Amaya introduced voluntary export controls on automobiles.

The Sarasota Herald-Tribune stated that after Amaya's retirement from the MITI, he "went on to become one of Japan's best-known commentators on economic issues." He became the executive director of the Dentsu Institute for Human Studies in 1987. He later became the chairperson and chief executive. He also served as a president of the Japan Economic Foundation (JEF).

According to the MITI he died of lung cancer on Tuesday, 30 August 1994 at age 68. His death occurred in Tokyo. The following day would have been his 69th birthday.
