= Jeff Steele =

American business executive (born 1971)

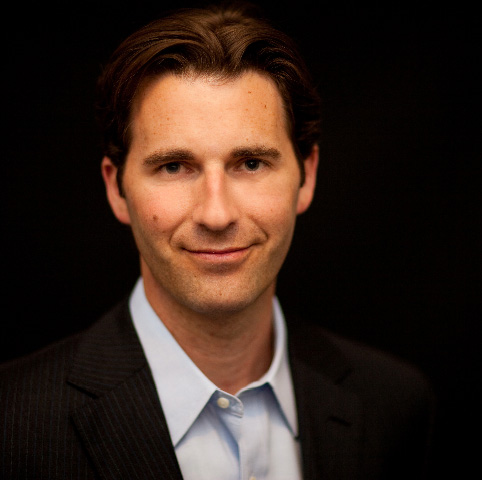
- Born: Jeffrey David Steele; September 25, 1971 (age 54); Whittier, California, U.S.

Jeff Steele (born September 25, 1971) is an American entertainment industry executive. He is founder and chief executive officer of the media finance company Film Closings Inc., and is publisher of the film finance blog, FilmClosings; he is a frequent contributor to The Huffington Post and The Wrap.

== Life and career ==
Jeff Steele was born in Whittier, California (in Los Angeles) but was raised in the town of Villa Park, in Orange County, California, where he graduated from Villa Park High School and became an Eagle Scout. He later attended California State University, Fullerton where he majored in Communications; at Fullerton he took a screenwriting class just to fill a credit and was subsequently exposed to the entertainment industry for the first time. Steele interned for a micro-budget independent film called Perfect Mate, and read scripts for a local Orange County producer named Mitch Teemly.

=== Early professional career ===
Steele got his first break when he landed an internship with Lynda Obst, a producer of major studio films who had a first-look deal with Fox 2000. From there Steele's early assistant career-path took him from the talent agency ICM, to Susan Landau Productions (at Fox 2000), to veteran television producer Ellen Krass, to MTV Networks CEO Tom Freston, and ultimately to Mike Medavoy at Phoenix Pictures (from 2001–2003).

After Phoenix Pictures, Steele joined indie production company Plinyminor, where, as head of co-productions and finance, he went on to produce the Primetime Emmy Nominated Movie Mammoth for NBC Universal's Sci Fi Channel (SyFy) and the documentary Who Killed the Electric Car?, which premiered at the 2006 Sundance Film Festival and was released theatrically by Sony Pictures Classics. Off the success of Mammoth, Plinyminor landed a five-picture deal with Sci-Fi Channel.

In 2006 Steele joined Screen Capital International as director of film finance, where he focused on gap, pre-sale, tax credit, and bridge funding. SCI, a structured finance company specialized in structuring and facilitating cross-border tax-advantaged financing for major motion picture producers, was preparing to launch Aramid Entertainment, a $300m debt fund specializing in pre-sale, gap, bridge, and tax credit lending in the United States and around the world. Aramid financed 35 films over two years, with budgets from $10m - $45m. SCI went on to create Incentive Entertainment, which wholly finances independent films with budgets from $5m - $15m.

=== Current professional career ===
Film Closings specializes in packaging and closing independent film finance deals and is based in Los Angeles and Chicago. In 2009, Jeff Steele joined Magnet Media Group as the chief financial officer. Steele is an expert in film finance, but also has a portfolio of hands-on producing credits. He is a frequent panelist for film financing forums, and he's known for telling audiences what they need to know, but do not want to hear. He has also been published in popular online blogs The Huffington Post and TheWrap. He currently is a professor at Columbia College Chicago in the Business and Entrepreneurship department.
