= Jeff Ferguson (ice hockey) =

Canadian ice hockey and roller hockey player

- Born: July 23, 1969 (age 55); Calgary, Alberta, Canada
- Height: 5 ft 8 in (173 cm)
- Weight: 175 lb (79 kg; 12 st 7 lb)
- Position: Goaltender
- Caught: Left
- Played for: WCHL; Fresno Falcons
- NHL draft: Undrafted
- Playing career: 1994–2000

Jeff Ferguson (born July 23, 1969) is a Canadian former professional ice hockey and inline hockey goaltender.

== Early life ==
Ferguson was born in Calgary, Alberta. He played major junior hockey in the Western Hockey League with the Calgary Wranglers, Lethbridge Hurricanes, and Spokane Chiefs.

== Career ==
Ferguson began his professional career during the 1994–1995 season in the Sunshine Hockey League with the Fresno Falcons. He went on the play six seasons with the Falcons before retiring following the 1999–2000 season.

In 1996, Ferguson set a Roller Hockey International (RHI) record when he posted a goals against average of 4.87 over 16 games played with the Los Angeles Blades.

== Awards and honours ==
Award	Year
WCHL Best Save Percentage (.890)	1995–96
WCHL Best Goals Against Average (3.75)	1995–96
RHI Best Goals Against Average (4.87)	1995–96
