= Japan Economic Foundation =

Organization in Japan

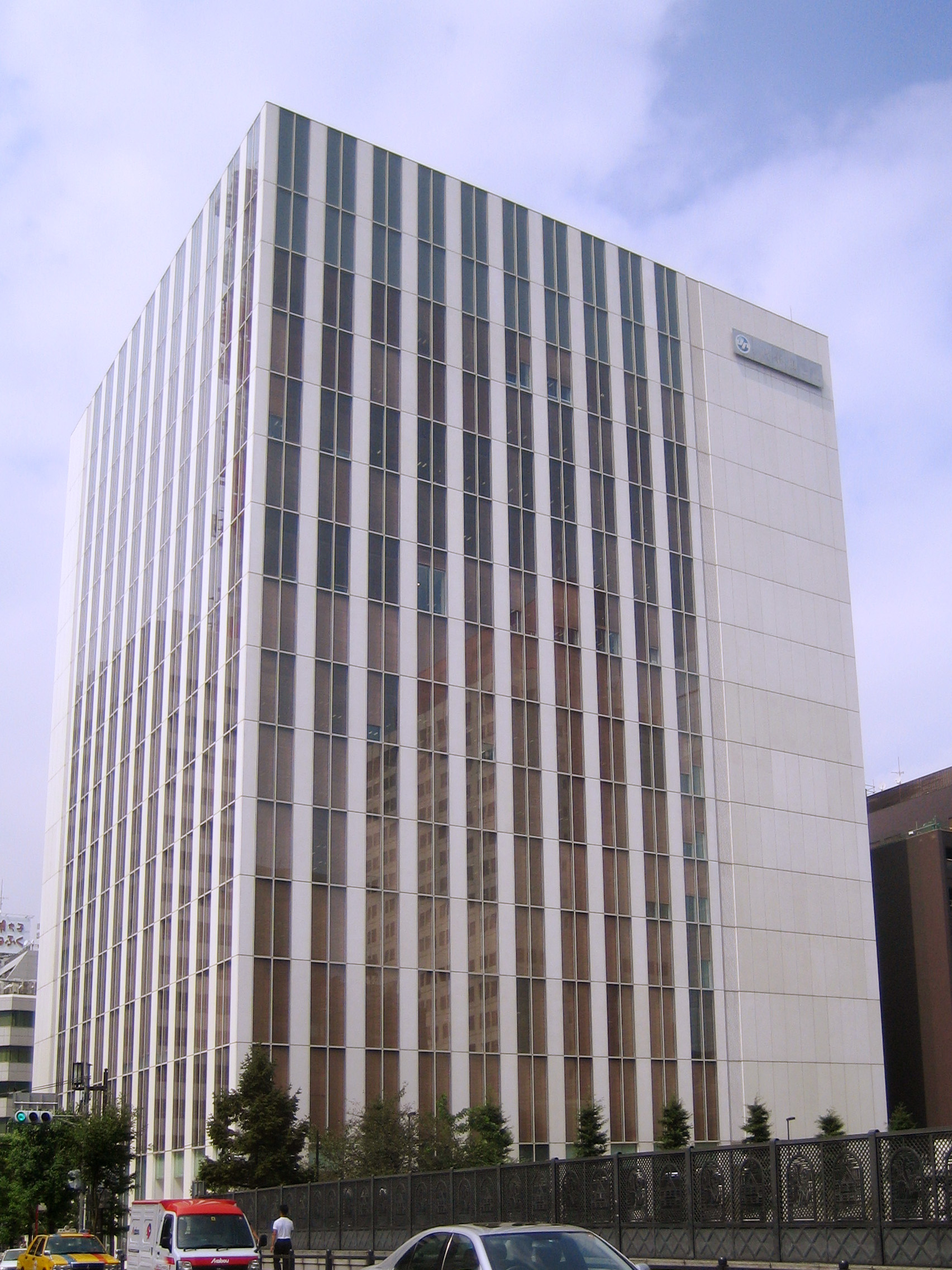
Jiji Press Building, current JEF headquarters

The Japan Economic Foundation (JEF, 国際経済交流財団 Kokusai Keizai Kōryū Zaidan) is an organization which describes itself as promoting economic and technological exchanges between Japan and other countries. Its head office is on the 11th floor of the Jiji Press Building (時事通信ビル Jiji Tsūshin Biru) in Ginza, Chuo, Tokyo. Previously its head office was on the 11th floor in the Fukoku Seimei Building (富国生命ビル Fukoku Seimei Biru) in Uchisaiwai-cho, Chiyoda, Tokyo.

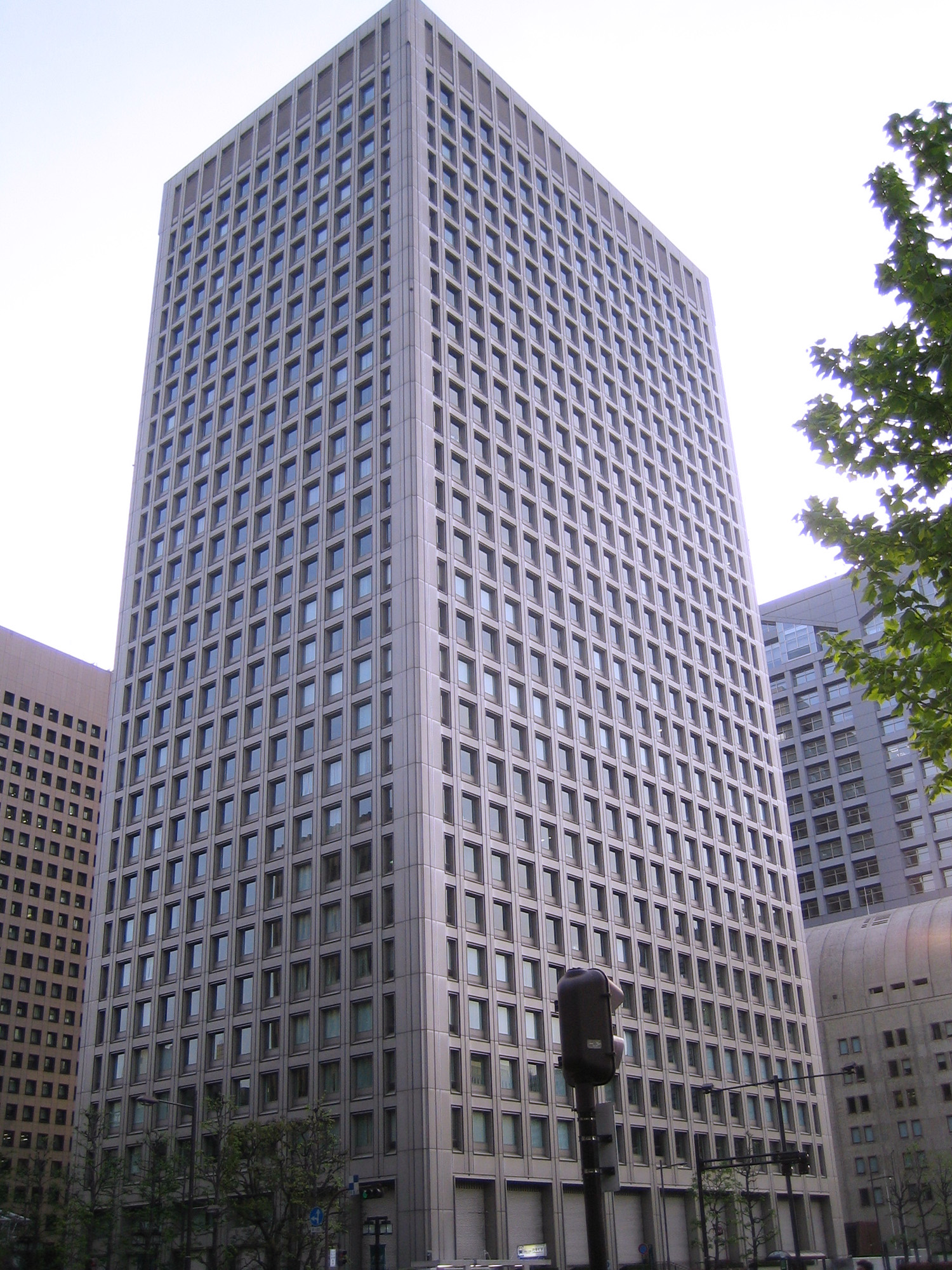
Fukoku Seimei Building, former headquarters

It was established in 1981. The Ministry of International Trade and Industry (MITI) established the agency as a way of reducing the size of its budget since it anticipated a reduction in its subsidies. Malcolm Trevor, author of Japan - Restless Competitor: The Pursuit of Economic Nationalism, wrote that because leadership roster included Shoichi Akazawa (赤澤 璋一 Akazawa Shōichi), Naohiro Amaya, and Minoru Masuda (益田 実 Masuda Minoru), its publications would be de facto government publications even if they are not presented as such.

== Publications ==
- Japan Spotlight (formerly Journal of Japanese Trade & Industry)
