= Jef Billings =

American figure skating costume designer

- Born: 1945; Utica, New York
- Died: September 27, 2016; Los Angeles
- Occupation: Costume designer

Jef Billings was an American figure skating costume designer who directed Stars on Ice for more than a decade. His clients included many Olympic and World figure skating medalists. One of his most renowned creations is the free skating costume for Sarah Hughes, in which she won her 2002 Olympic gold medal at Salt Lake City.

Billings also worked for celebrities. He created a black dress for Kathy Bates in which she won the Academy Award for Best Actress in 1991. Country singer Tammy Wynette was costumed by him for a long time.

Billings won several Emmy Awards for his television work.

== Awards and nominations ==
=== Primetime Emmy Awards ===
Year	Nominated work	Category	Result
1995	Disney's Nancy Kerrigan Special: Dreams on Ice, CBS	Outstanding Individual Achievement in Costume Design for a Variety or Music Program	Nominated
1999	The Snowden Raggedy Ann and Andy Holiday Show, CBS	Outstanding Costume Design for a Variety or Music Program	Won
2000	Target Stars on Ice, CBS	Outstanding Costumes for a Variety or Music Program	Nominated
2001	Target Presents: Scott Hamilton's Farewell to Stars on Ice, CBS	Outstanding Costumes for a Variety or Music Program	Nominated
2002	Target Stars on Ice, A&E	Outstanding Costumes for a Variety or Music Program	Nominated
2004	Smucker's Stars on Ice 2004, A&E	Outstanding Costumes for a Variety or Music Program	Won

=== Daytime Emmy Awards ===
Year	Nominated work	Category	Result
1993	Knights and Warriors	Outstanding Achievement in Costume Design	Nominated
2002	Kurt Browning's Gotta Dance, NBC	Outstanding Achievement in Costume Design/Styling	Nominated
2005	An Evening with Scott Hamilton & Friends, NBC (as producer)	Outstanding Special Class Special	Nominated
2005	An Evening with Scott Hamilton & Friends, NBC (as costume designer)	Outstanding Achievement in Costume Design/Styling	Won
2006	Kristi Yamaguchi Family & Friends, NBC	Outstanding Achievement in Costume Design/Styling	Nominated
2010	Smucker's Stars on Ice, NBC	Outstanding Achievement in Costume Design/Styling	Nominated
