= Griffin (surname) =

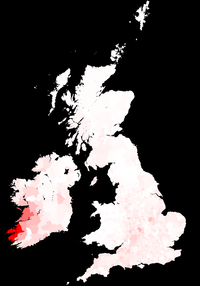
- Griffin surname map

Origin
- Origin: Irish
- Meaning: "descendant of the Griffin-like"

Griffin is a surname of primarily Irish origin. Griffin was the 75th most common surname on the island of Ireland in 1891. It was estimated in 2000 that Griffin is the 114th most common surname in the U.S., with a population in the order of two hundred thousand.

== Griffin in Ireland ==
The surname "Griffin" has a number of sources in Ireland.

=== Uí Ghríofa ===
The spelling Ó Gríofa (male) or Ní Ghríofa (female) is associated with the Co. Clare family, whose surname was also anglicised as O'Griffey or O'Griffy. Ó Gríofa translates to English as "descendant of the Griffin-like".

Prior to the Irish spelling review, Ó Gríofa was spelt Ó Gríobhtha. The Ó Gríofa were chieftains of the Cineal Cuallachta branch of the Dál gCais, or Dalcassians, with their castle at Ballygriffy located in North Ballygriffey, Dysert (formerly the barony of Inchiquin). The Ó Gríofa are of the same stock as the O'Deas and the O'Quins, who belong to the Uí Fhearmaic.

The surname appears in the 14th-century medieval Gaelic chronicle Caithréim Thoirdhealbhaigh (“The Triumphs of Turlough”), written around 1310–1320, which records the wars of Toirdhealbhach Ó Briain (Turlough O’Brien), King of Thomond. The chronicle mentions a notable figure, Tomás mac Urthaile Ó Gríofa, who acted as both a military leader and diplomatic envoy, commissioned to negotiate on behalf of the Dalcassians with the Anglo-Norman de Clare family. This reference highlights the family's significant status in medieval Irish politics and warfare.

Another prominent member of the family was Mathgamhain Ó Gríobhtha (Matthew O'Griffey), who was Bishop of Killaloe from 1463 until his death in 1483. The Annals of the Four Masters record his death in 1483 as that of “Mathgamhain Ua Griobhtha”, Bishop of Killaloe, and state that he was buried at the monastery of the Canons in Corcovaskin. Clare historian Michael MacMahon identifies him as Bishop Matthew Ó Griobhtha (O'Griffey) and notes that he was probably associated with the Augustinian tradition, as he was buried in the Augustinian monastery on Canons' Island.

Gerald Griffin (1803–1840) was an Irish novelist, poet and playwright born in Limerick. His family was descended from the Gaelic Ó Gríobhtha, a Clare family whose name was anglicised as Griffy, Griffith and Griffin. According to his brother Daniel's biography, members of the family had moved from County Clare into neighbouring Limerick, including their grandfather James Griffin of Corgarriff, while his father Patrick Griffin had also lived for several years in County Clare before settling in Limerick. Griffin is best known for his novel The Collegians (1829), and later joined the Christian Brothers, dying in Cork in 1840.

Mártán Ó Gríobhtha (Martin Griffin or Griffy) was a blacksmith and Irish-language scribe from Kilrush, County Clare, active in the mid-19th century. He produced substantial manuscripts of Irish traditional literature, including an 881-page manuscript entitled An Sgeulaidhe ("The Story-teller"), written in 1842–1843 and containing thirty-eight Fenian and other legends, some copied from manuscripts dating to 1749. Another manuscript made by Ó Gríobhtha in 1844 survives in Cambridge University Library, while the National Library of Ireland also records a manuscript of Irish poetry for which he was the scribe.

Mícheál Ó Gríobhtha (1869–1946) was an Irish-language writer, translator and civil servant from County Clare. He was born at Cathair Aoidh, Liscasey, County Clare, on 21 January 1869, grew up in a bilingual environment, and subsequently worked in the Irish civil service. From 1922 until his retirement he worked in the Department of Education, where he was involved in Irish-language publications and terminology. Ó Gríobhtha was also a prolific Irish-language writer and translator. His publications included Go mbeannuighthear dhuit (1925), Bean an Bhrait Bháin (1928) and other works of Irish fiction and drama. The National Library of Ireland catalogues Bean an Bhrait Bháin under his name and identifies him as its author. Ó Gríobhtha played an important role in the preparation of Bunreacht na hÉireann, the Constitution of Ireland adopted in 1937. At the request of Éamon de Valera, he prepared the first Irish draft of the Constitution in 1936, with Risteárd Ó Foghludha subsequently assisting as editor. De Valera particularly valued Ó Gríobhtha's clear and precise Irish. The Irish-language version subsequently became the authoritative text where the two language versions differ.

James Griffin (1870–1955), known locally as Séamus Mór Ó Gríobhtha, was an Irish-language activist, seanchaí and folklorist from Kilkee, County Clare. He was involved in organising Irish-language classes and feiseanna in Clare and was among those responsible for the establishment of O'Curry Irish College at Carrigaholt, where he served as a trustee. His 1955 obituary described him as one of the oldest native Irish speakers in the district.

=== County Kerry Griffins ===
County Kerry Griffins are descendants of Gallowglasses who fought in the Desmond Rebellions against the English.

The Kerry Griffin surname is also found in Irish as Ó Gríbhthín, with the modern spelling Ó Grífín. Irish Names and Surnames (1906) associates Ó Gríbhthín specifically with County Kerry, west Limerick and west Cork. The Irish-language form Ó Gríbhthín is also documented among speakers in County Kerry in the National Folklore Collection held by Dúchas, including Séamus Ó Gríbhthín and Máire Bean Uí Ghríbhthín.

=== Griffith ===
In Ireland, the surname Griffin can also be associated with the Welsh surname "Griffith", but to a much lesser degree.

== Griffin in Wales ==
The surname "Griffin" in Wales, generally speaking, is a variant of the surname "Griffith", or other similar Welsh names.

== Notable people with the surname ==
=== A ===
- Abigail Griffin, American politician
- Adrian Griffin (born 1974), American basketball player
- Alan Griffin (born 1960), Australian politician
- Alex Griffin (born 1971), English guitarist
- Alfredo Griffin (born 1957), Dominican Republic baseball player
- Alistair Griffin (born 1977), English singer-songwriter and musician
- Alyssa Farah Griffin (born 1989), American political strategist
- Amanda Griffin (born 1979), English model and television personality
- Andy Griffin (born 1979), English footballer
- Angela Griffin (born 1976), English television actress
- Anne Dias-Griffin (born 1971), French/American hedge fund manager
- Anne Griffin (fl 2013 –), Irish short story writer and novelist
- Annie Griffin (born 1960), American writer and director
- Anthony Griffin (born 1966), Australian rugby league football coach
- Anthony Jerome Griffin (1866–1935), American politician
- Archie Griffin (born 1954), American football player
- Arthur Griffin (disambiguation), several people
- AJ Griffin (born 1988), American baseball player
- Aubrey Griffin (born 2001), American basketball player

=== B ===
- Barbara Griffin, American politician
- Bartholomew Griffin (died 1602), English poet
- Becky Griffin (born 1977), Israeli model and actress, and daughter of Bob Griffin
- Ben Griffin (disambiguation), several people
- Benjamin Griffin (disambiguation), several people
- Bernard William Griffin (1899–1956), Cardinal Archbishop of Westminster 1943–56
- Bessie Griffin (1922–1989), American Gospel singer
- Billy Griffin (born 1950), American singer
- Blake Griffin (born 1989), American basketball player
- Bob Griffin (disambiguation), several people
  - Bob Griffin (born 1950), American-Israeli basketball player
- Brian C. Griffin (born 1953), American businessman & administrator
- Brian Griffin (1948–2024), British photographer
- Brit Griffin (born c. 1959), Canadian journalist and writer

=== C ===
- Cedric Griffin (born 1982), American football player
- Charles Griffin (1825–1867), American Union general
- Charlie Griffin (footballer) (born 1979), British footballer
- Chase Griffin (born 2000), American football player
- Clarence Griffin (1888–1973), American tennis player
- Clive Griffin (born 1964), British singer
- Colin Griffin (born 1982), Irish race walker
- Colin Griffin (footballer) (born 1956), English footballer
- Cornelius Griffin (born 1986), American football player
- Cyrus Griffin (1749–1810), American lawyer and administrator
- Corey Griffin (born 1984), American law enforcement officer and standard bearer of horrible Griffen tattoo

=== D ===
- Dale "Buffin" Griffin (1948–2016), British musician
- Daniel T. Griffin (1911–1941), American Navy pilot
- Danny Griffin (born 1977), Northern Ireland footballer
- David Griffin (disambiguation), several people
- David Ray Griffin (1939–2022), American philosopher
- Deborah Griffin, English rugby player
- Deborah H. Griffin, American statistician
- Des Griffin (born 1934), American author and conspiracy theorist
- Dev Griffin (born 1984), British DJ and presenter
- Donald Griffin (1915–2003), American zoologist
- Doug Griffin (1947–2016), American baseball player
- Drew Griffin (1962–2022), American journalist

=== E ===
- Eddie Griffin (born 1968), African-American actor and comedian
- Edgar Griffin, British politician
- Edna Griffin (1909–2000), civil rights activist
- Edward Griffin (disambiguation), several people
- Eoin Griffin (born 1990), Irish rugby player
- Eric Griffin, American rock guitarist
- Eric Griffin (born 1990), American basketball player
- Eric Griffin (1967–2023), American boxer
- Erik Griffin (born 1972), American stand-up comedian and actor

=== F ===
- Farah Griffin (born 1963), American academic
- Floyd Griffin (born 1944), American politician
- Forrest Griffin (born 1979), American MMA fighter
- Foster Griffin (born 1995), American baseball player
- Francis Griffin (disambiguation)
  - Francis E. Griffin (1910–1973), American architect
- Francis Vielé-Griffin (1864–1937), French poet
- Frank Hastings Griffin (1886–1975), American chemist who invented Rayon

=== G ===
- G. Edward Griffin (born 1931), American conspiracy theorist, film producer, author, and political lecturer
- Gavin Griffin (born 1981), American poker player
- Geoffrey Griffin (1939–2006), South African Test cricketer
- Geoffrey William Griffin (1933–2005), Kenyan youth leader
- George Griffin (1849–1897), American freed slave and confidant of Mark Twain
- George C. Griffin (1897–1990), American university teacher and administrator
- George Eugene Griffin (1781–1863), English pianist and composer
- Gerald Griffin (1803–1840), Irish novelist, poet and playwright
- Gerald D. Griffin (born 1934), American aeronautical engineer
- Grete Griffin (born 1993), Estonian heptathlete
- Grey Griffin (alternate name of Grey DeLisle) (born 1973), American voice actress

=== H ===
- Harold Griffin (born c. 1929), American football player
- Harriet Griffin (1903–1991), American mathematician
- A. Harry Griffin (1911–2004), journalist and mountaineer
- Harry Griffin (1873–1938), English cricketer
- Hayden Griffin (1943–2013), British stage designer
- Helen Griffin (1959–2018), Welsh actress and writer

=== I ===
- Ian P. Griffin (born 1966), New Zealand astronomer

=== J ===
- James Griffin (disambiguation), several people
- James Bennett Griffin (1905–1997), American archaeologist
- James D. Griffin (1929–2008), American politician
- Jane Griffin (Lady Franklin) (1791–1875), British explorer and the second wife of Sir John Franklin
- Jennifer Griffin, American journalist
- Jimmy Griffin (1943–2005), American singer and songwriter
- John Griffin (disambiguation), several people
- John-Ford Griffin (born 1979), American professional baseball player
- John Griffin Griffin (name used by John Griffin Whitwell) (1719–1797), 4th Baron Howard de Walden
- John Howard Griffin (1920–1980), American journalist and author
- Johnny Griffin (1928–2008), American jazz saxophonist
- Junius Griffin (1929–2005), African American civil rights activist

=== K ===
- Kathy Griffin (born 1960), American comedian and actress
- Katie Griffin (born 1973), Canadian actress and singer
- Kelsey Griffin (born 1987), American–Australian basketball player
- Ken Griffin (1914–1988), American cowboy, leather worker, magician, and author
- Kenneth C. Griffin (born 1968), American billionaire hedge fund manager
- Kenneth W. Griffin (1909–1956), American organist
- Kevin Griffin (born 1968), American singer, songwriter and record producer
- Khamani Griffin (born 1998), American actor
- Kimani Griffin (born 1990), American speed skater
- Konnor Griffin (born 2006), American baseball player

=== L ===
- Lanto Griffin (born 1988), American professional golfer
- Larry Griffin (1954–1995), American murderer
- Leonard Griffin (born 1962), American football player
- Leonard Griffin (born 1887), American baseball player
- Leonard Griffin (born 1982), American soccer player
- Liam Griffin (disambiguation), several people
- Lideatrick Griffin (born 2001), American football player
- Lois Griffin (born c. 1942), Canadian politician
- Lorie Griffin, American actress
- Lorna Griffin (born 1956), American sportswoman
- Lynne Griffin (born 1952), Canadian actress

=== M ===
- Malaika Griffin (born 1971), American anti-white racist convicted of murder
- Marc Griffin (born 1956), American judge
- Marcus Griffin (born 1985), American football player
- Marion Mahony Griffin (1871–1961), American architect and artist
- Martin Griffin, several people
- Marvin Griffin (1907–1982), American politician
- Matthew Griffin (disambiguation), several people
- Max Griffin (born 1985), American mixed martial arts fighter
- Maxwell Griffin (born 1987), American soccer player
- Merv Griffin (1925–2007), American talk show host
- Michael D. Griffin (born 1949), American physicist and aerospace engineer
- Michael F. Griffin, anti-abortion activist who killed David Gunn
- Michael Griffin (disambiguation), several people
- Miriam T. Griffin (1935–2018), American historian
- Montell Griffin (born 1970), American boxer
- Morgan Griffin (born 1992), Australian actress

=== N ===
- Nick Griffin (born 1959), former chairman of the British National Party
- Nonnie Griffin (1933–2019), Canadian stage actress

=== O ===
- Olaijah Griffin (born 1999), American football player

=== P ===
- Patrick Griffin (disambiguation), several people
- Patty Griffin (born 1964), American singer-songwriter
- Paul Griffin (disambiguation), several people
- Peter Griffin (disambiguation), several people
- Phil Griffin (born 1956), American television executive

=== Q ===
- Quentin Griffin (born 1981), American football player

=== R ===
- Rashawn Griffin (born 1980), American visual artist, educator
- Renee Griffin (born 1968), American actress
- Richard Griffin (disambiguation), several people
- Richard Allen Griffin (born 1952), American judge
- Rick Griffin (1944–1991), American illustrator & cartoonist
- Robert Griffin (disambiguation), several people
- Robert Griffin III (born 1990), American football player
- Robert P. Griffin (1923–2015), American politician
- Roger Griffin (born 1948), British historian
- Roger F. Griffin (1935–2021), British astronomer
- Ron Griffin (footballer) (1919–1987), English footballer
- Ron Griffin (artist) (born 1954), American artist
- Ruth Griffin (1893–1984), American actress better known as Ruth Renick

=== S ===
- S. A. Griffin (born 1954), American poet & actor
- Samuel Griffin (1746–1810), American lawyer & politician
- Sandy Griffin (1858–1926), American baseball player
- Shaquem Griffin (born 1995), American football player and twin brother of:
- Shaquill Griffin (born 1995), American football player
- Simon Goodell Griffin (1824–1902), American soldier
- Steve Griffin (born 1964), American football player
- Susan Griffin (1943–2025), American radical feminist philosopher, essayist and playwright

=== T ===
- Tatianna Griffin (born 2010), American basketball player
- Taylor Griffin (born 1986), American basketball player (and brother of Blake Griffin)
- Ted Griffin (born 1970), American screenwriter
- Ted Griffin (1913–1998), Australian rules footballer
- Theresa Griffin (born 1962), British politician
- Thomas Griffin (1773–1837), American politician, lawyer and judge
- Tim Griffin (born 1968), American lawyer and politician
- Tom Griffin (disambiguation), several people
- Tyrone William Griffin Jr. (born 1985), American musician known professionally as Ty Dolla Sign
- Tyson Griffin (born 1984), American martial artist
- Todd Griffin, American musician

=== V ===
- Victor Griffin (1924–2017), Irish Anglican priest and author
- Victor William Griffin (c. 1873–1958), Quapaw chief and peyote roadman
- Virgil Lee Griffin (1944–2009), American leader of a Ku Klux Klan chapter

=== W ===
- W. E. B. Griffin (1929–2019), American author
- Walter Burley Griffin (1878–1937), American architect and landscape architect
- William Griffin (disambiguation), several people
- William Richard Griffin (1882–1944), American auxiliary bishop of the Diocese of La Crosse

=== Griffey ===
- Anthony Dean Griffey (born 1970), American operatic tenor
- Carolyn Griffey (born 1969), American soul vocalist and member of the soul funk group Shalamar
- Dan Griffey (born 1970), American politician
- Dick Griffey (1938–2010), American record producer and promoter, father of Carolyn Griffey
- Ken Griffey Jr. (born 1969), former Major League Baseball player
- Ken Griffey Sr. (born 1950), former Major League Baseball player, father of Ken Griffey Jr.

== Fictional characters with the surname ==
- The Griffin family of Family Guy:
  - Peter Griffin, father
  - Lois Griffin, mother
  - Meg Griffin, daughter and oldest child
  - Chris Griffin, older son
  - Stewie Griffin, younger son
  - Brian Griffin, anthropomorphic pet dog
  - Francis Griffin, Peter's (adoptive) father
  - Thelma Griffin, Peter's mother
  - Karen "Heavy Flo" Griffin, Peter's sister
- Griffin (The Invisible Man), fictional character in H. G. Wells' The Invisible Man, first name Jack only in film versions
- Judge Jürgen Griffin, a character in the Judge Dredd comic strip
- Henry Griffin, a character in The O.C.
- Kylie Griffin, a character in Extreme Ghostbusters and in the IDW Ghostbusters comic series
- Ric Griffin, a Holby City character played by actor Hugh Quarshie
- Sandi Griffin, a character in the animated series Daria
- Clarke Griffin, a character in The CW network series The 100
- Arthur Griffin, a secondary character in American television series Big Time Rush
- Hawley Griffin, a character from The League of Extraordinary Gentlemen
- Danny Griffin, character in the British TV series New Tricks.
- Sgt. Jack Griffin Character in 2009 Horror FPS game Shellshock 2: Blood Trails

== See also ==
- Griffen (surname)
- Griffin
- Griffin (disambiguation)
- Griffin's Foods
- Griffin Theatre Company
- Griffin Poetry Prize
- Griffith (surname)
- Webster Griffin Tarpley, journalist
- Irish clans
