= 1954 in the United States =

- Decades: 1930s; 1940s; 1950s; 1960s; 1970s
- See also: History of the United States (1945–1964); Timeline of United States history (1950–1969); List of years in the United States

Events from the year 1954 in the United States.

== Incumbents ==
=== Federal government ===
- President: Dwight D. Eisenhower (R-Kansas/New York)
- Vice President: Richard Nixon (R-California)
- Chief Justice: Earl Warren (California)
- Speaker of the House of Representatives: Joseph William Martin Jr. (R-Massachusetts)
- Senate Majority Leader: William F. Knowland (R-California)
- Congress: 83rd

==== State governments ====
Governors and lieutenant governors

=== Governors ===
- Governor of Alabama: Gordon Persons (Democratic)
- Governor of Arizona: John Howard Pyle (Republican)
- Governor of Arkansas: Francis Cherry (Democratic)
- Governor of California: Goodwin Knight (Republican)
- Governor of Colorado: Daniel I. J. Thornton (Republican)
- Governor of Connecticut: John Davis Lodge (Republican)
- Governor of Delaware: J. Caleb Boggs (Republican)
- Governor of Florida: Charley Eugene Johns (Democratic)
- Governor of Georgia: Herman Talmadge (Democratic)
- Governor of Idaho: Len Jordan (Republican)
- Governor of Illinois: William G. Stratton (Republican)
- Governor of Indiana: George N. Craig (Republican)
- Governor of Iowa:
  - until November 21: William S. Beardsley (Republican)
  - November 21–22: vacant
  - starting November 22: Leo Elthon (Republican)
- Governor of Kansas: Edward F. Arn (Republican)
- Governor of Kentucky: Lawrence W. Wetherby (Democratic)
- Governor of Louisiana: Robert F. Kennon (Democratic)
- Governor of Maine: Burton M. Cross (Republican)
- Governor of Maryland: Theodore R. McKeldin (Republican)
- Governor of Massachusetts: Christian A. Herter (Republican)
- Governor of Michigan: G. Mennen Williams (Democratic)
- Governor of Minnesota: C. Elmer Anderson (Republican)
- Governor of Mississippi: Hugh L. White (Democratic)
- Governor of Missouri: Phil M. Donnelly (Democratic)
- Governor of Montana: J. Hugo Aronson (Republican)
- Governor of Nebraska: Robert B. Crosby (Republican)
- Governor of Nevada: Charles H. Russell (Republican)
- Governor of New Hampshire: Hugh Gregg (Republican)
- Governor of New Jersey: Alfred E. Driscoll (Republican) (until January 19), Robert B. Meyner (Democratic) (starting January 19)
- Governor of New Mexico: Edwin L. Mechem (Republican)
- Governor of New York: Thomas Dewey (Republican) (until end of December 31)
- Governor of North Carolina: William B. Umstead (Democratic) (until November 7), Luther H. Hodges (Democratic) (starting November 7)
- Governor of North Dakota: Clarence Norman Brunsdale (Republican)
- Governor of Ohio: Frank J. Lausche (Democratic)
- Governor of Oklahoma: Johnston Murray (Democratic)
- Governor of Oregon: Paul L. Patterson (Republican)
- Governor of Pennsylvania: John S. Fine (Republican)
- Governor of Rhode Island: Dennis J. Roberts (Democratic)
- Governor of South Carolina: James Francis Byrnes (Democratic)
- Governor of South Dakota: Sigurd Anderson (Republican)
- Governor of Tennessee: Frank G. Clement (Democratic)
- Governor of Texas: Allan Shivers (Democratic)
- Governor of Utah: J. Bracken Lee (Republican)
- Governor of Vermont: Lee E. Emerson (Republican)
- Governor of Virginia: John S. Battle (Democratic) (until January 20), Thomas Bahnson Stanley (Democratic) (starting January 20)
- Governor of Washington: Arthur B. Langlie (Republican)
- Governor of West Virginia: William C. Marland (Democratic)
- Governor of Wisconsin: Walter J. Kohler Jr. (Republican)
- Governor of Wyoming: Clifford Joy Rogers (Republican)

=== Lieutenant governors ===
- Lieutenant Governor of Alabama: James B. Allen (Democratic)
- Lieutenant Governor of Arkansas: Nathan Green Gordon (Democratic)
- Lieutenant Governor of California: Harold J. Powers (Republican)
- Lieutenant Governor of Colorado: Gordon L. Allott (Republican)
- Lieutenant Governor of Connecticut: Edward N. Allen (Republican)
- Lieutenant Governor of Delaware: John W. Rollins (Democratic)
- Lieutenant Governor of Georgia: Marvin Griffin (Democratic)
- Lieutenant Governor of Idaho: Edson H. Deal (Republican)
- Lieutenant Governor of Illinois: John William Chapman (Republican)
- Lieutenant Governor of Indiana: Harold W. Handley (Republican)
- Lieutenant Governor of Iowa: Leo Elthon (Republican)
- Lieutenant Governor of Kansas: Fred Hall (Republican)
- Lieutenant Governor of Kentucky: Emerson Beauchamp (political party unknown)
- Lieutenant Governor of Louisiana: C. E. "Cap" Barham (Democratic)
- Lieutenant Governor of Massachusetts: Sumner G. Whittier (Republican)
- Lieutenant Governor of Michigan: Clarence A. Reid (Republican)
- Lieutenant Governor of Minnesota: vacant (until month and day unknown), Donald O. Wright (Republican) (starting month and day unknown)
- Lieutenant Governor of Mississippi: Carroll Gartin (Democratic)
- Lieutenant Governor of Missouri: James T. Blair Jr. (Democratic)
- Lieutenant Governor of Montana: George M. Gosman (Republican)
- Lieutenant Governor of Nebraska: Charles J. Warner (Republican)
- Lieutenant Governor of Nevada: Clifford A. Jones (Democratic) (until December), vacant (starting December)
- Lieutenant Governor of New Mexico: Tibo J. Chávez (Democratic)
- Lieutenant Governor of New York: Walter J. Mahoney (Republican) (until end of December 31)
- Lieutenant Governor of North Carolina: Luther H. Hodges (Democratic) (until November 7), vacant (starting November 7)
- Lieutenant Governor of North Dakota: Clarence P. Dahl (Republican)
- Lieutenant Governor of Ohio: John William Brown (Republican)
- Lieutenant Governor of Oklahoma: James E. Berry (Democratic)
- Lieutenant Governor of Pennsylvania: Lloyd H. Wood (Republican)
- Lieutenant Governor of Rhode Island: John S. McKiernan (Democratic)
- Lieutenant Governor of South Carolina: George Bell Timmerman Jr. (Democratic)
- Lieutenant Governor of South Dakota: Rex A. Terry (Republican)
- Lieutenant Governor of Tennessee: Jared Maddux (Democratic)
- Lieutenant Governor of Texas: Ben Ramsey (Democratic)
- Lieutenant Governor of Vermont: Joseph B. Johnson (Republican)
- Lieutenant Governor of Virginia: Allie Edward Stokes Stephens (Democratic)
- Lieutenant Governor of Washington: Emmett T. Anderson (Republican)
- Lieutenant Governor of Wisconsin: George M. Smith (Republican)

== Events ==
=== January ===
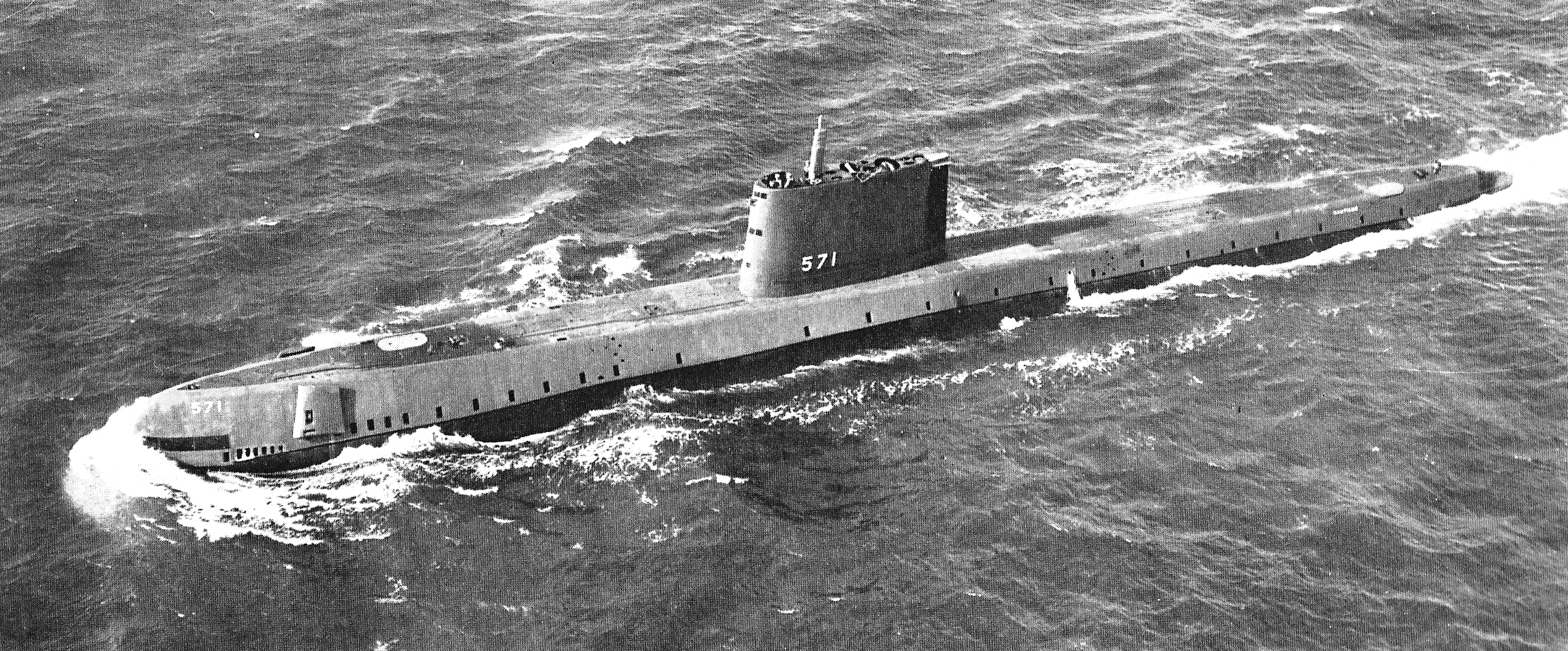
January 21: USS Nautilus, the first nuclear-powered submarine

- January 14 – Marilyn Monroe marries baseball player Joe DiMaggio at San Francisco City Hall.
- January 20
  - The U.S.-based National Negro Network is established with 40 charter member radio stations.
  - Rogers Pass, Montana, records the coldest temperature in the contiguous United States of −70 °F (−56.7 °C).
- January 21 – The first nuclear-powered submarine, the USS Nautilus, is launched in Groton, Connecticut, by First Lady of the United States Mamie Eisenhower.
- January 25 – The foreign ministers of the United States, United Kingdom, France and the Soviet Union meet at the Berlin Conference.

=== February ===
- February 2 – New York City Ballet co-founder and balletmaster George Balanchine's production of The Nutcracker is staged for the first time in New York, becoming an annual tradition there, still being performed there as of 2022.
- February 10 – After authorizing $385,000,000 over the $400,000,000 already budgeted for military aid to Vietnam, U.S. President Dwight Eisenhower warns against United States intervention in Vietnam.
- February 23 – The first mass vaccination of children against polio begins in Pittsburgh, Pennsylvania.

=== March ===
- March 1
  - U.S. officials announce that a hydrogen bomb test has been conducted on Bikini Atoll in the Pacific Ocean.
  - U.S. Capitol shooting incident: Four Puerto Rican nationalists open fire in the United States House of Representatives chamber and wound five people; they are apprehended by security guards.
- March 9 – Journalists Edward Murrow and Fred W. Friendly produce a 30-minute See It Now documentary, entitled A Report on Senator Joseph McCarthy.
- March 16 – The Army–McCarthy hearings are convened.
- March 19 – Joey Giardello knocks out Willie Tory at Madison Square Garden, in the first televised boxing prizefight to be shown in color.
- March 25 – The 26th Academy Awards ceremony is simultaneously held at RKO Pantages Theatre in Hollywood (hosted by Donald O'Connor) and at NBC Century Theatre (hosted by Fredric March). Fred Zinnemann's From Here to Eternity wins and receives the most respective awards and nominations, with eight (matching Gone with the Wind's record) and thirteen, including Best Motion Picture and Best Director for Zinnemann.
- March 28 – Puerto Rico's first television station, WKAQ-TV, goes on the air.

=== April ===
- April 1 – President Dwight D. Eisenhower authorizes the creation of the United States Air Force Academy in Colorado.
- April 7 – Dwight D. Eisenhower gives his "domino theory" speech during a news conference.
- April 16 – Vice President Richard Nixon announces that the United States may be "putting our own boys in Indochina regardless of Allied support."
- April 22 – Senator Joseph McCarthy begins hearings investigating the United States Army for being "soft" on Communism.

=== May ===
- May 14 – The Boeing 707 is released after about two years of development.
- May 16 – National Educational Television is launched on cable TV. It will become PBS on October 5, 1970.
- May 17 – Brown v. Board of Education (347 US 483 1954): The Supreme Court of the United States rules that segregated schools are unconstitutional.

=== June ===
- June 9 – McCarthyism: Joseph Welch, special counsel for the United States Army, lashes out at Senator Joseph McCarthy, during hearings on whether Communism has infiltrated the Army, saying, 'Have you, at long last, no decency?'.
- June 14 – The words "under God" are added to the United States Pledge of Allegiance.
- June 17 – A CIA-engineered military coup occurs in Guatemala.
- June 27 – Guatemalan President Jacobo Arbenz Guzmán steps down in a CIA-sponsored military coup, triggering a bloody civil war that continues for more than thirty-five years.

=== July ===
- July 1 – The United States officially begins using the international unit of the nautical mile, equal to 6,076.11549 ft. or 1,852 meters.
- July 15 – The maiden flight of the Boeing 367-80 (or Dash 80), a prototype of the Boeing 707 series.
- July 19 – Elvis Presley's first single, a cover of "That's All Right", is released by Sun Records (recorded July 5 in Memphis, Tennessee).

=== August ===
- August 16 – The first issue of Sports Illustrated magazine is published.
- August 24 – U.S. Congress passes the Communist Control Act, outlawing the Communist Party in the U.S.

=== September ===
- September 3 – The last new episode of The Lone Ranger is aired on radio, after 2,956 episodes over a period of 21 years.
- September 8 – The original Sunshine Skyway Bridge opens to traffic in Florida.
- September 11 – The Miss America Pageant is broadcast on television for the first time.
- September 16 – Lewis Strauss, chairman of the United States Atomic Energy Commission, in a speech to the National Association of Science Writers claims: "It is not too much to expect that our children will enjoy in their homes electrical energy too cheap to meter".
- September 29 – The Catch (baseball): A notable defensive play is made by New York Giants center fielder Willie Mays on a ball hit by Cleveland Indians batter Vic Wertz during Game 1 of the 1954 World Series at the Polo Grounds in Upper Manhattan.
- September 30 – The USS Nautilus, the first nuclear-powered submarine, is commissioned by the United States Navy.

=== October ===
- October 2 – The New York Giants (baseball) defeat the Cleveland Indians, 4 games to 0, to win their 5th World Series Title.
- October 15 – Hurricane Hazel makes U.S. landfall; it is the only recorded Category 4 hurricane to strike as far north as North Carolina.
- October 18 – Texas Instruments announces the development of the first transistor radio.

=== November ===
- November 10 – U.S. President Dwight D. Eisenhower dedicates the USMC War Memorial (Iwo Jima memorial) in Arlington National Cemetery.
- November 12 – The main immigration port of entry in New York Harbor at Ellis Island closes.
- November 23 – The Dow Jones Industrial Average rises 3.27 points, or 0.86%, closing at an all-time high of 382.74. More significantly, this is the first time the Dow has surpassed its peak level reached just before the Wall Street crash of 1929.
- November 30 – In Sylacauga, Alabama, a 4 kg piece of the Hodges Meteorite crashes through the roof of a house and badly bruises a napping woman, in the first documented case of an object from outer space hitting a person.

=== December ===
- December 1 – The first Hyatt Hotel, The Hyatt House Los Angeles, opens. It is the first hotel in the world built adjacent to an airport.
- December 2
  - Red Scare: The U.S. Senate votes 67–22 to condemn Joseph McCarthy of Wisconsin for "conduct that tends to bring the Senate into dishonor and disrepute."
  - The Sino-American Mutual Defense Treaty between the U.S. and Republic of China is signed.
- December 4 – The first branch of Burger King opens in Miami, Florida, USA.
- December 21 – The 6.5 M_{L} Eureka earthquake affects the north coast of California with a maximum Mercalli intensity of VII (Very strong). Several people are injured and one killed, with $2.1 million in damage.
- December 23 – The first successful kidney transplant is performed by Joseph E. Murray, MD in Boston from one identical twin to his brother. Murray will later share the 1990 Nobel Prize in Physiology or Medicine for his "[discovery] concerning organ and cell transplantation in the treatment of human disease".

=== Undated ===
- Mongolian gerbils are brought to the U.S. by Dr. Victor Schwentker.
- The Boy Scouts of America desegregates on the basis of race.
- The TV dinner is introduced by entrepreneur Gerry Thomas.
- The Treasury of Science Fiction Classics is published.

=== Ongoing ===
- Cold War (1947–1991)
- Second Red Scare (1947–1957)

== Births ==
Born in the United States of America in 1954

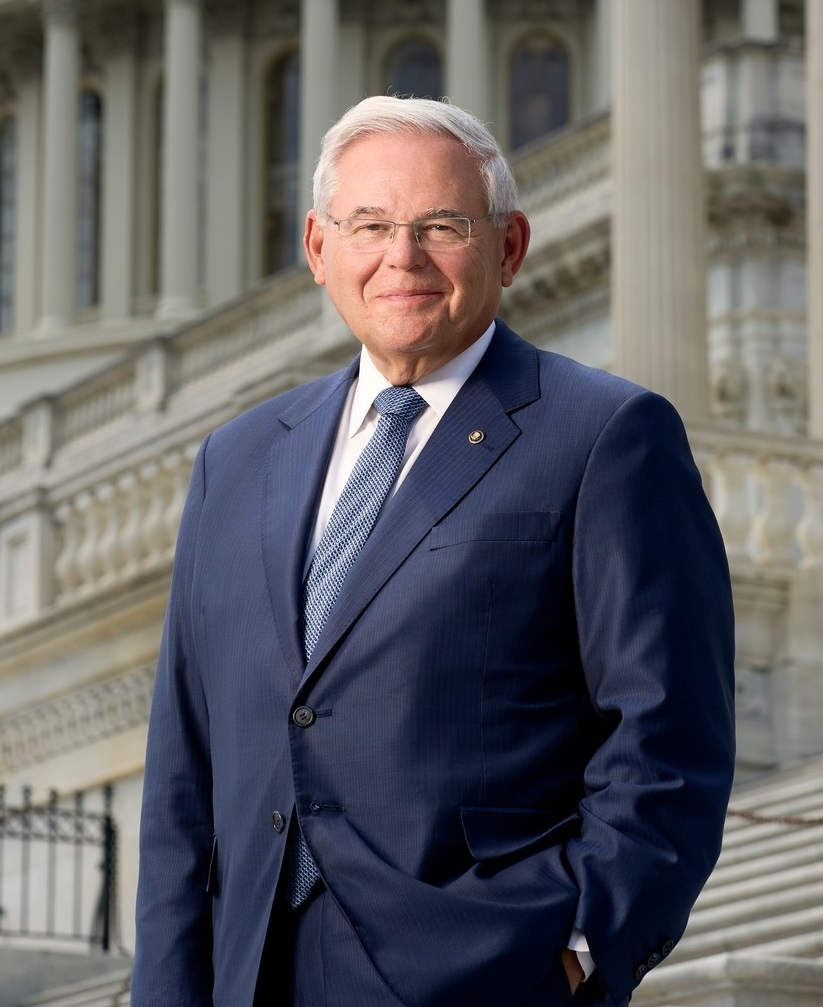
Former New Jersey Senator Bob Menendez

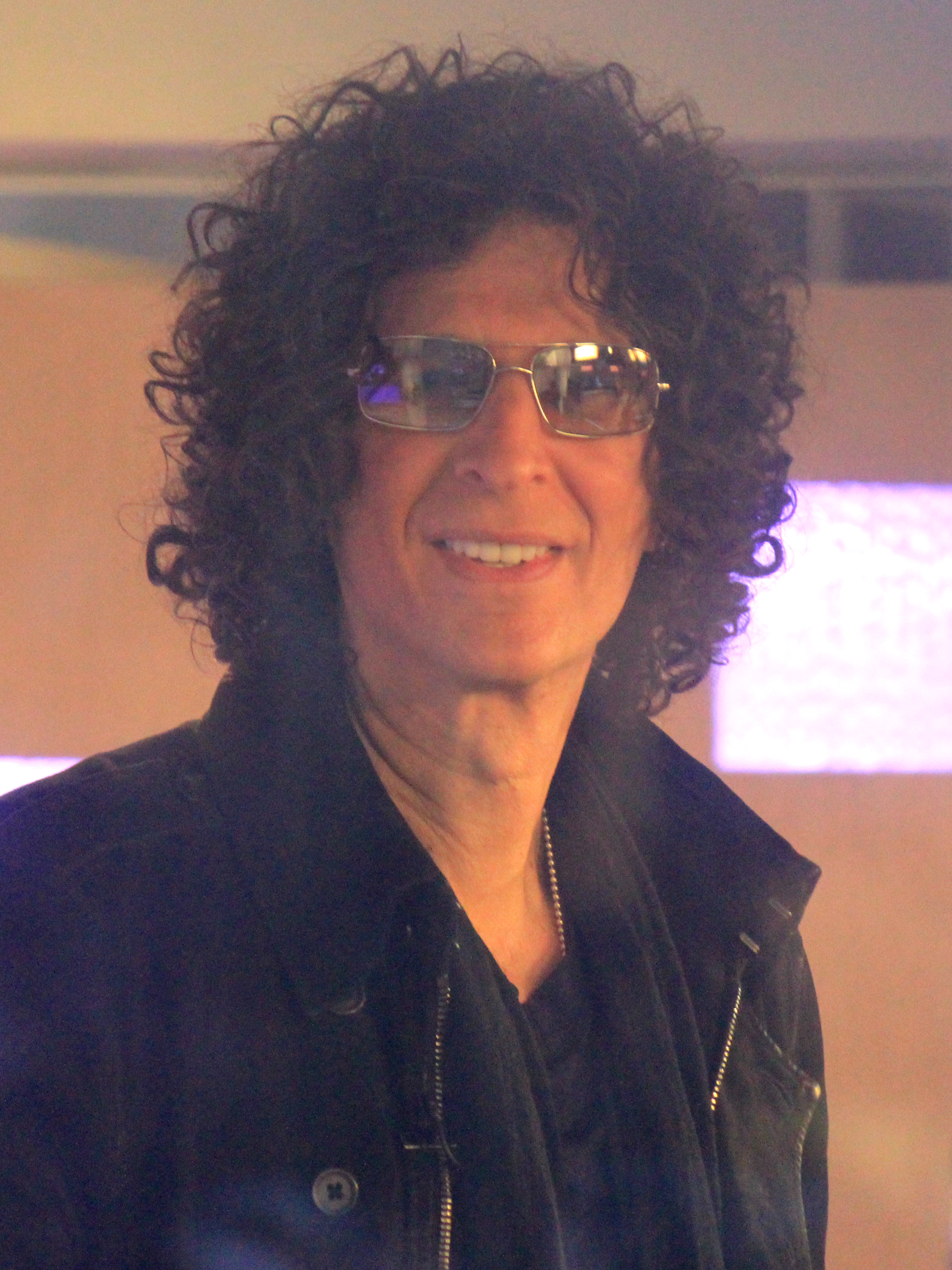
Howard Stern

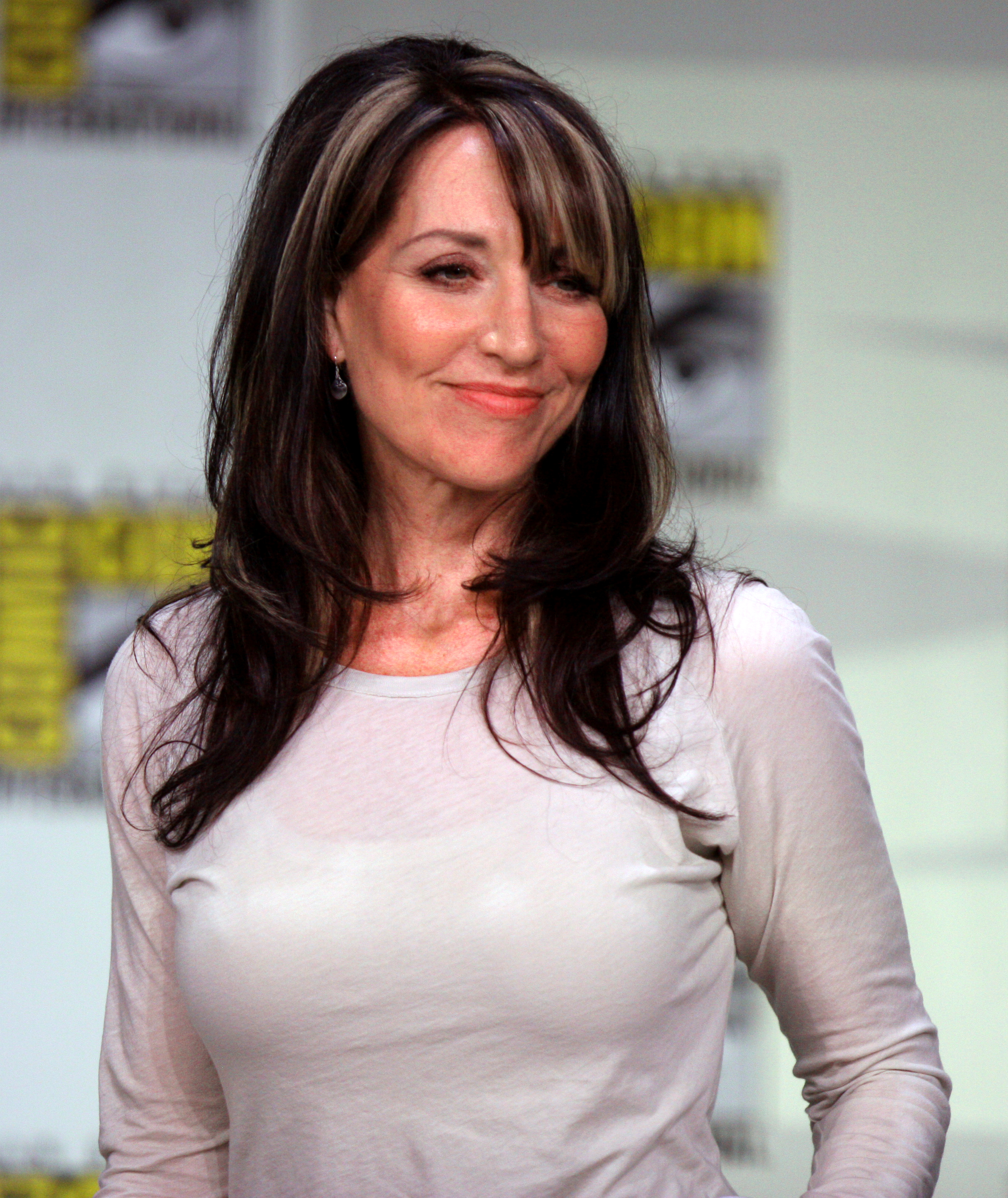
Katey Sagal

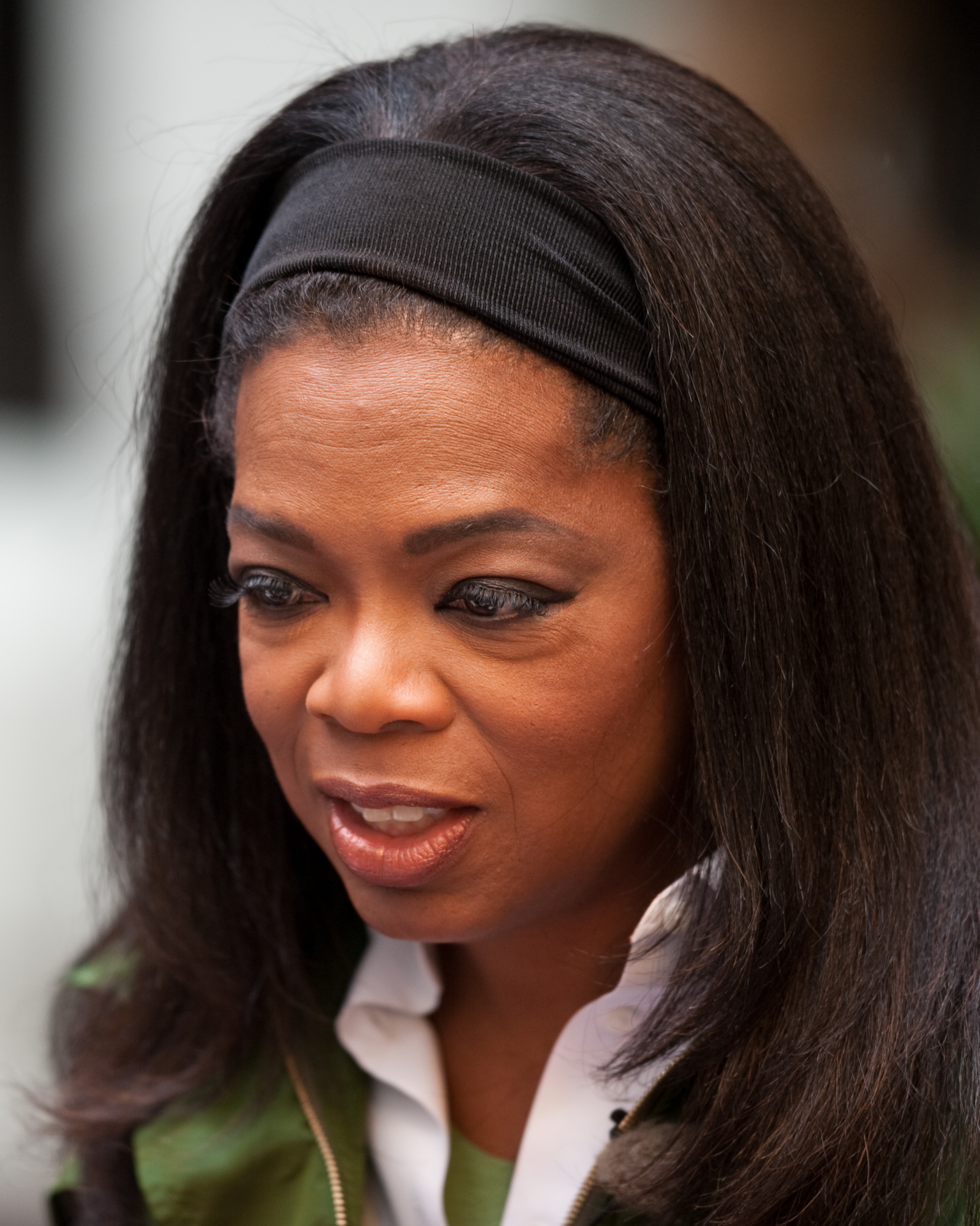
Oprah Winfrey

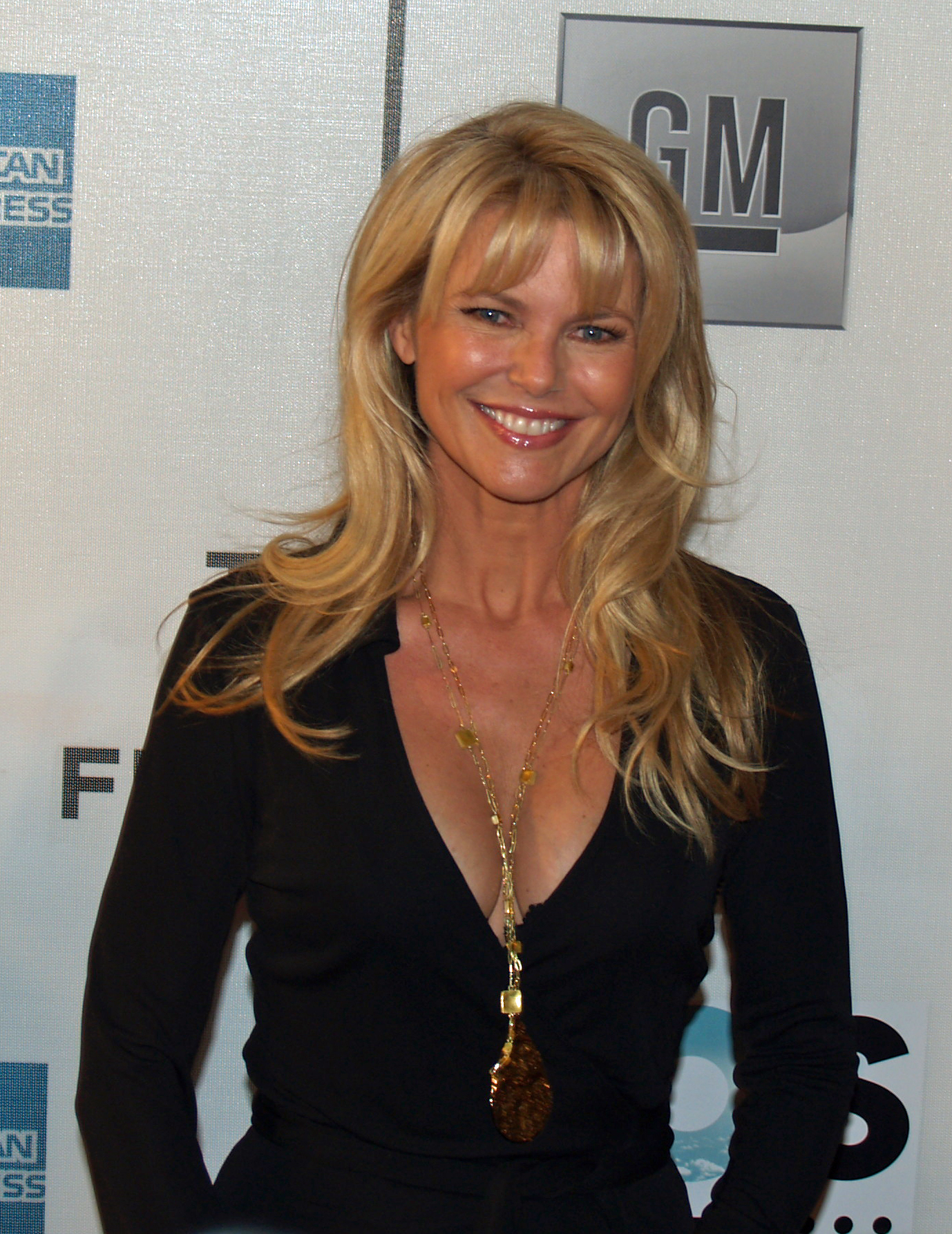
Christie Brinkley

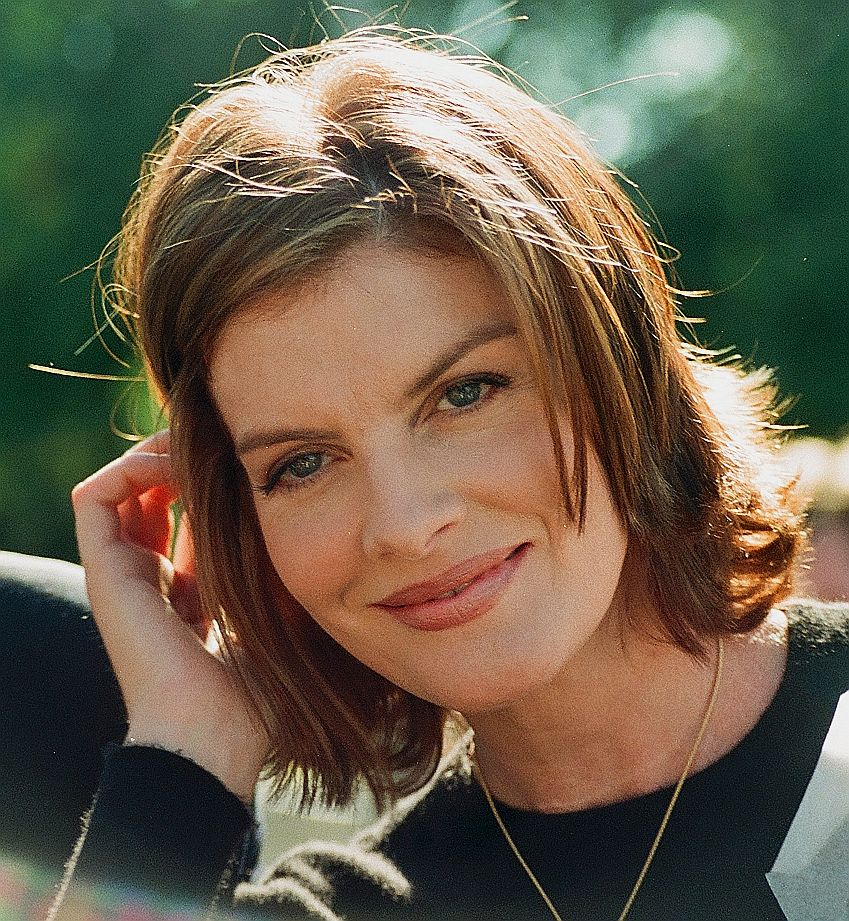
Rene Russo

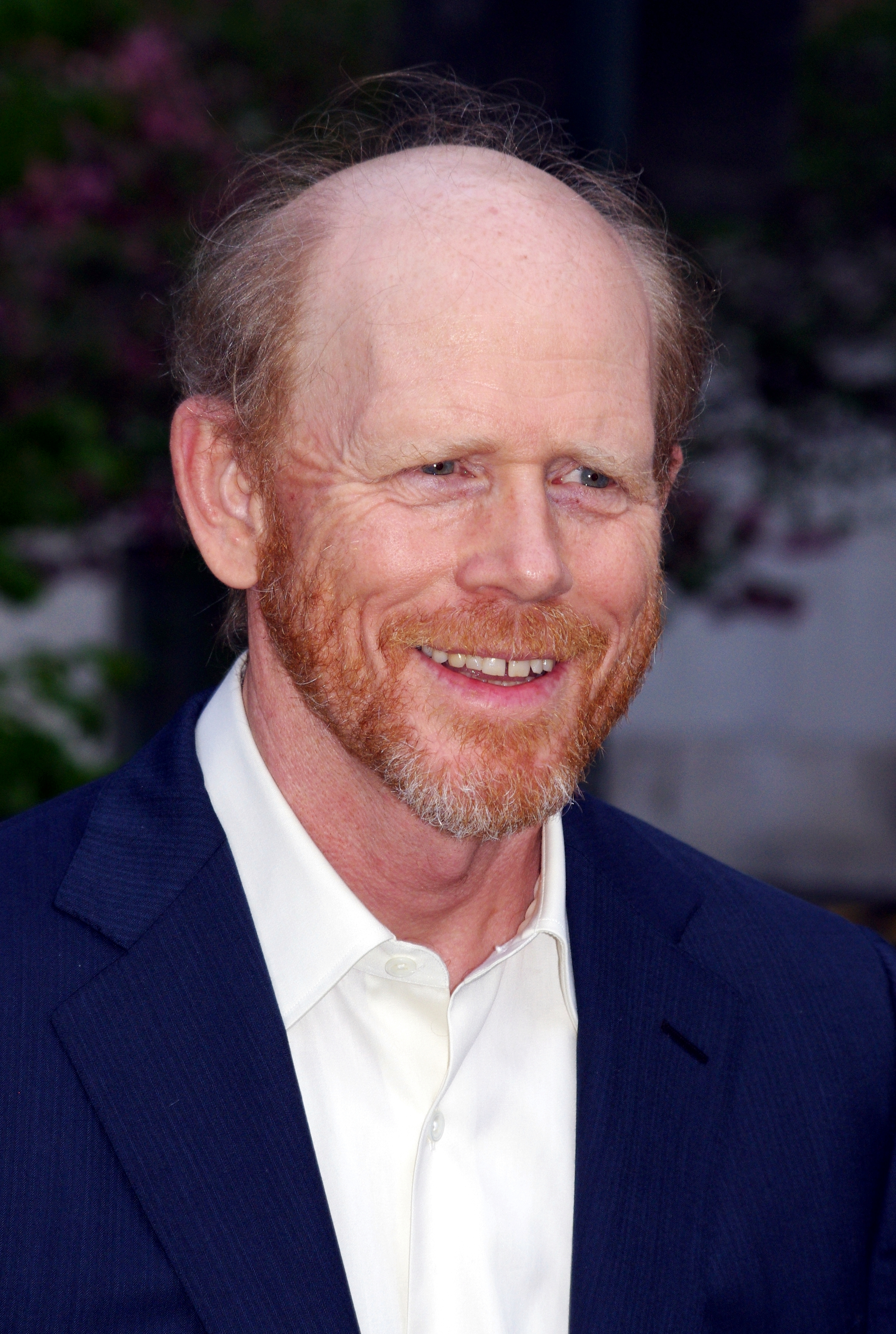
Ron Howard

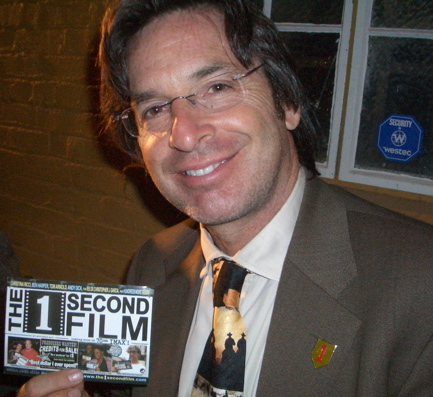
Robert Carradine

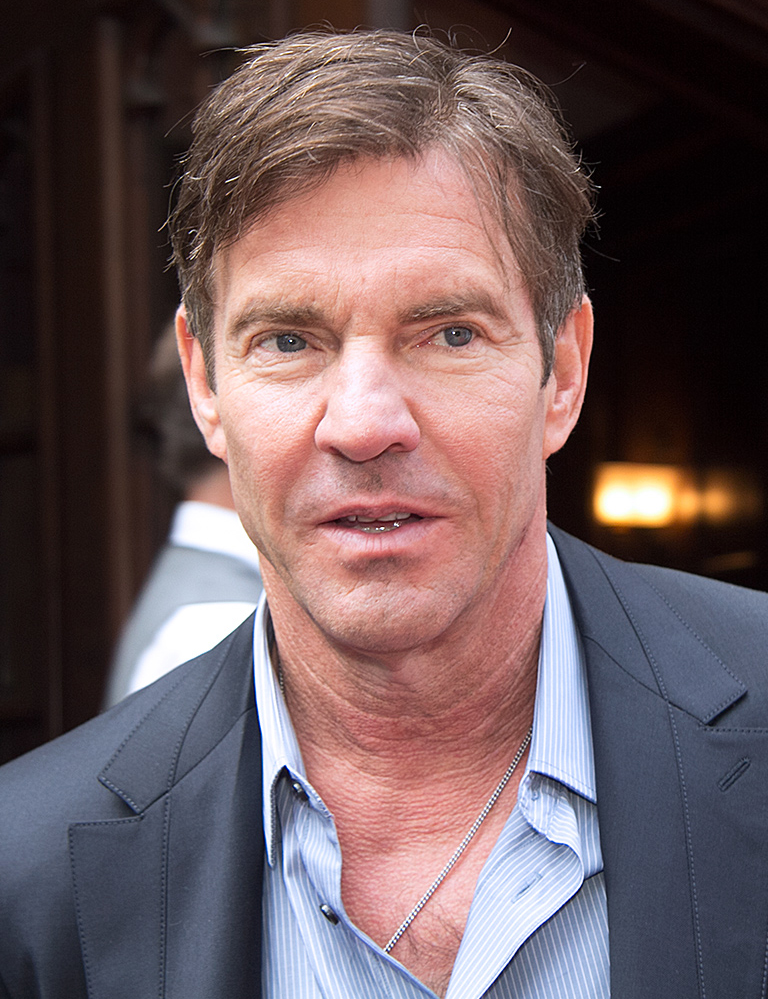
Dennis Quaid

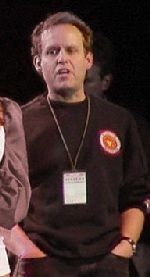
Peter MacNicol

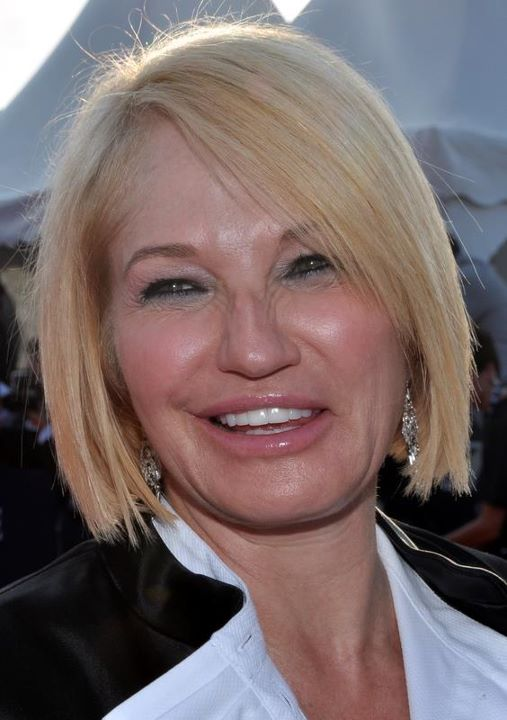
Ellen Barkin

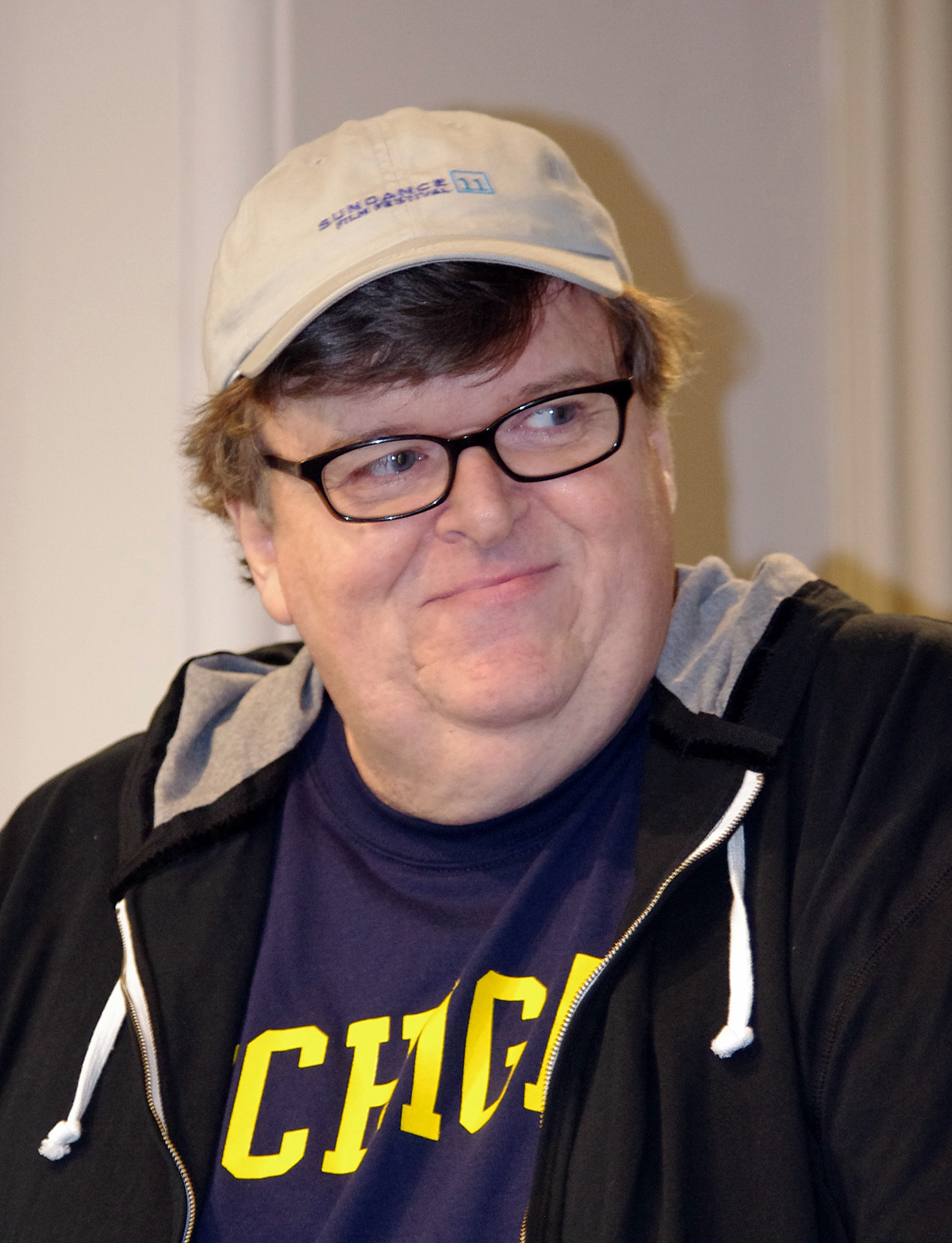
Michael Moore

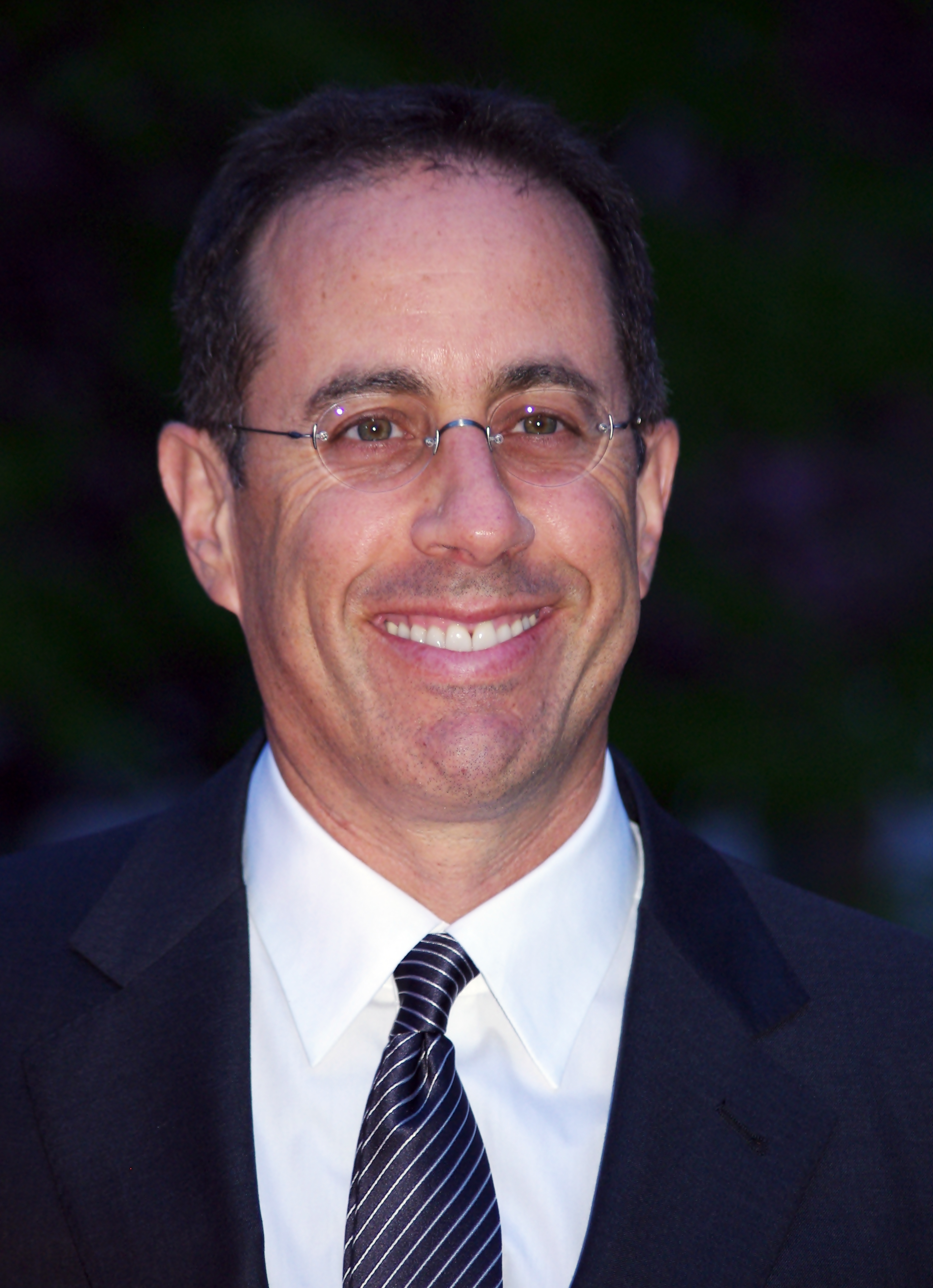
Jerry Seinfeld

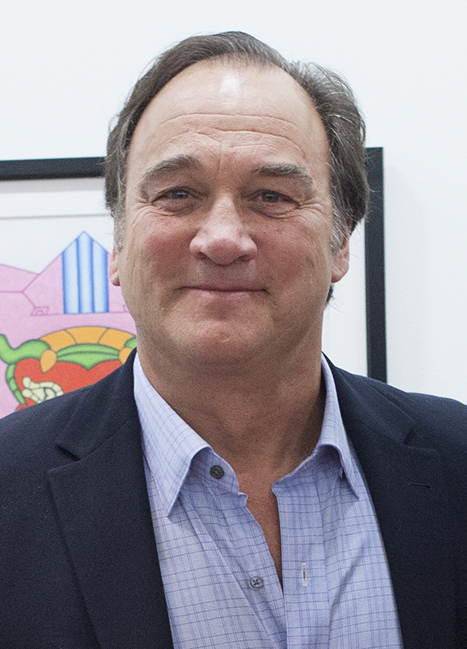
Jim Belushi

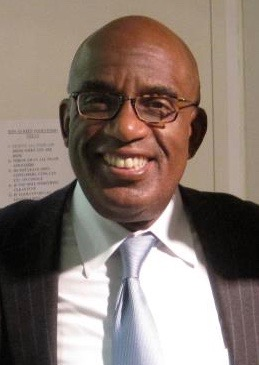
Al Roker

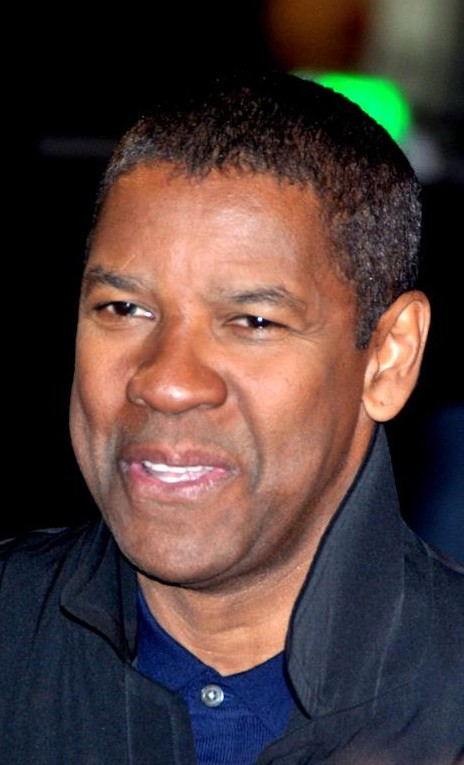
Denzel Washington

=== January–March ===
- January 1
  - Richard Edson, actor and musician
  - Bob Menendez, former U.S. Senator from New Jersey
- January 3 – Ned Lamont, Governor of Connecticut
- January 12 – Howard Stern, broadcaster and media presenter
- January 17 – Robert F. Kennedy Jr., environmental lawyer and political figure
- January 19
  - Clifford Tabin, geneticist and academic
  - Katey Sagal, actress and singer
- January 20 – Ken Page, actor and singer (d. 2024)
- January 23
  - Richard Finch, bass player, songwriter, and producer (KC and the Sunshine Band)
  - Greg Guidry, singer, songwriter (d. 2003)
- January 29
  - Bill Evers, baseball player, coach and manager
  - Oprah Winfrey, talk show host presenter, television producer, actress, author, and media proprietor.
  - Terry Kinney, actor
- February 2 – Christie Brinkley, supermodel and actress
- February 3 – Tom Barrise, basketball coach (d. 2022)
- February 7 – Joe Maddon, baseball coach and manager
- February 9 – Chris Gardner, African-American businessman, investor, stockbroker, motivational speaker, author, and philanthropist
- February 12 – Philip Zimmermann, cryptographer
- February 13
  - Gary A. Rendsburg, professor of biblical studies, Hebrew language, and ancient Judaism
  - Isiah Whitlock Jr., actor (d. 2025)
- February 15 – Matt Groening, author, cartoonist, producer and screenwriter
- February 16 – Margaux Hemingway, fashion model and actress, sister of Mariel Hemingway (d. 1996)
- February 17 – Rene Russo, actress
- February 18 – John Travolta, actor and singer
- February 20 – Patty Hearst, heiress and kidnap victim
- February 22 – Nathan Phillips, Native American activist
- March 1 – Ron Howard, director and film producer
- March 19 – Jill Abramson, writer, journalist, and academic
- March 20 – Louis Sachar, author
- March 24
  - Mike Braun, businessman and politician
  - Robert Carradine, actor (d. 2026)
- March 26 – Curtis Sliwa, activist, radio talk show host and politician

=== April–June ===
- April 1 – Jeff Porcaro, drummer and songwriter (Toto) (d. 1992)
- April 3 – Chuck Deardorf, musician (d. 2022)
- April 5 – David Edward Maust, serial killer (d. 2006)
- April 8 – Gary Carter, baseball player (d. 2012)
- April 9 – Dennis Quaid, actor
- April 10 – Peter MacNicol, actor
- April 13 – Glen Keane, animator and director
- April 16 – Ellen Barkin, actress
- April 23 – Michael Moore, filmmaker, writer, social critic and activist
- April 29
  - Jerry Seinfeld, comedian and actor
  - Joe D'Alessandris, American football coach (d. 2024)
- May 1
  - Ray Parker Jr., musician and composer
  - Alan Poul, screen producer and director
- May 4 – Doug Jones, U.S. Senator from Alabama from 2018 to 2021
- May 8
  - Pam Arciero, puppeteer and voice actress
  - David Keith, actor and director
  - John Michael Talbot, Christian musician
- May 10 – Mike Hagerty, actor (d. 2022)
- May 11 – John Clayton, sportswriter (d. 2022)
- May 12 – Rafael Yglesias, novelist and screenwriter
- May 20
  - Cindy McCain, diplomat and wife of John McCain
  - David Paterson, politician, attorney, and former Governor of New York
- May 21 – Janice Karman, film producer, record producer, singer and voice artist, wife of Ross Bagdasarian Jr.
- May 23 – Marvelous Marvin Hagler, middleweight boxer (d. 2021)
- May 26 – Danny Rolling, murderer (d. 2006)
- May 28
  - Townsend Coleman, voice actor
  - Jasper White, chef (d. 2024)
- May 29 – Jerry Moran, U.S. Senator from Kansas from 2011
- June 2 – Dennis Haysbert, actor
- June 8
  - Greg Ginn, punk rock guitarist, singer, and songwriter (Black Flag)
  - Woodrow Lowe, American football player (d. 2025)
- June 14 – Cyrus Vance, Jr., New York County District Attorney from 2010 to 2022
- June 15 – Jim Belushi, actor and comedian
- June 19 – Kathleen Turner, actress
- June 25 – Sonia Sotomayor, Associate Justice of the Supreme Court of the United States of America
- June 27 – Ron Griffin, artist

=== July–September ===
- July 1 – Keith Whitley, country music singer (d. 1989)
- July 3 – Pennie Lane Trumbull, socialite
- July 13 – Andrew Klavan, novelist and political commentator
- July 15 – Jeff Jarvis, journalist and blogger
- July 16 – Jeanette Mott Oxford, politician
- July 23 – Janet Cooke, disgraced journalist, forced to return a Pulitzer Prize for a fabricated story
- July 25 – Walter Payton, football running back playing for the Chicago Bears (d. 1999)
- August 1 – Philip Trenary, businessman (d. 2018)
- August 19 – Lin Brehmer, disc jockey and radio personality (d. 2023)
- August 20 – Al Roker, meteorologist and television presenter from Today
- August 24 – Ed Buck, Democratic political activist and fundraiser
- August 30 – David Paymer, actor and television director
- September 6 – Carly Fiorina, businesswoman, CEO of Hewlett-Packard
- September 8 – Raymond T. Odierno, army general (d. 2021)
- September 15 – Barry Shabaka Henley, character actor
- September 17 – Jubilant Sykes, singer (d. 2025)
- September 21 – Cass Sunstein, legal scholar
- September 23 – Melanie Skillman, archer
- September 24 – Ash Carter, 25th United States Secretary of Defense (d. 2022)
- September 27
  - Sylvester Turner, politician, mayor of Houston (d. 2025)
  - Larry Wall, computer programmer
- September 29 – Cindy Morgan, actress (d. 2023)

=== October–December ===
- October 3
  - Dennis Eckersley, baseball player
  - Joe Gates, baseball player and coach (d. 2010)
  - Al Sharpton, pastor and activist
- October 9 – John O'Hurley, actor, comedian, author, game show host and television personality
- October 26 – Stephen L. Carter, African American author of legal thrillers
- November 12 – Rob Lytle, American football player (d. 2010)
- November 14
  - Anson Funderburgh, guitarist and bandleader
  - Condoleezza Rice, first female African American Secretary of State, in office from 2005 to 2009
- November 24 – Clem Burke, drummer from Blondie (d. 2025)
- December 1 – Bob Goen, television personality and game show host
- December 2 – Stone Phillips, journalist and educator
- December 4 – Tony Todd, actor (d. 2024)
- December 9 – Jack Sonni, guitarist (d. 2023)
- December 10 – Gavin Smith, film studio executive (d. 2012)
- December 11 – Jermaine Jackson, member of Jacksons
- December 15 – Mark Warner, U.S. Senator from Virginia from 2009
- December 18 – Ray Liotta, actor and producer (d. 2022)
- December 24 – Karla Burns, opera singer (d. 2021)
- December 26 – Ozzie Smith, baseball player
- December 28
  - Denzel Washington, actor
  - Gayle King, television journalist
- December 29 – Alan Myers, new wave rock drummer (Devo) (d. 2013)

== Deaths ==
=== January–March ===
- January 1 – Leonard Bacon, poet (b. 1887)
- January 6 – Rabbit Maranville, baseball player (b. 1891)
- January 12
  - William H. P. Blandy, admiral (b. 1890)
  - Elmer H. Geran, politician (b. 1875)
- January 17 – Leonard Eugene Dickson, mathematician (b. 1874)
- January 30 – John Murray Anderson, Canadian-born American actor, dancer, theatre director (b. 1886)
- January 31
  - Edwin Armstrong, electrical engineer (b. 1890)
  - Florence Bates, character actress (b. 1888)
- February 6 – Maxwell Bodenheim, poet and novelist (murdered) (b. 1892)
- February 8 – Laurence Trimble, silent film director and actor (b. 1885)
- February 9 – Mabel Paige, actress (b. 1880)
- February 16 –Senda Berenson Abbott, basketball pioneer (b. 1868)
- February 21 – William K. Howard, film director (b. 1899)
- March 5 – Zella de Milhau, artist, ambulance driver, community organizer and motorcycle policewoman (b. 1870)
- March 7 – Will H. Hays, politician and first chairman of the Motion Picture Producers and Distributors of America (b. 1879)
- March 26 – Louis Silvers, film composer (b. 1889)
- March 30 – Horatio Dresser, New Thought religious leader (b. 1866)

=== April–June ===
- April 2
  - Hoyt Vandenberg, U.S. Air Force general (b. 1899)
  - Maud Barger-Wallach, tennis player (b. 1870)
- April 8 – Fritzi Scheff, singer and actress (b. 1879 in Austria)
- April 19 – Russell Davenport, journalist and publisher (b. 1899)
- April 21 – Emil Post, mathematician and logician (b. 1897)
- April 29 – Joe May, film director (b. 1880 in Austria)
- May 1 – Tom Tyler, film actor (b. 1903)
- May 3 – Earnest Hooton, writer on anthropology (b. 1887)
- May 15 – William March, fiction writer and marine (b. 1893)
- May 19 – Charles Ives, composer (b. 1874)
- May 22 – Chief Bender, Native American baseball player (Philadelphia Athletics) (b. 1884)
- May 25 – Robert Capa, photojournalist (killed on location in Vietnam) (b. 1913 in Hungary)
- June 9 – Alain LeRoy Locke, African American cultural leader (b. 1885)
- June 21 – Harvey A. Carr, psychologist (b. 1873)
- June 22 – Don Hollenbeck, newscaster (b. 1905)

=== July–September ===
- July 3 – Reginald Marsh, painter (b. 1898)
- July 13
  - Irving Pichel, actor and director (b. 1891)
  - Grantland Rice, sportswriter (b. 1880)
- July 14 – Jackie Saunders, silent screen actress (b. 1892)
- July 17 – Machine Gun Kelly, gangster (b. 1895)
- August 3 – Bess Streeter Aldrich, novelist (b. 1881)
- August 17 – Billy Murray, singer (b. 1877)
- August 31 – Elsa Barker, writer (b. 1869)
- September 1 – Bert Acosta, aviator (b. 1895)
- September 3 – Eugene Pallette, film actor (b. 1889)
- September 6 – Edward C. Kalbfus, admiral (b. 1877)
- September 7
  - Bud Fisher, cartoonist (b. 1885)
  - Glenn Scobey Warner, college football coach (b. 1871)
- September 20 – Washington Phillips, gospel singer and instrumentalist (b. 1880)
- September 26 – Ellen Roosevelt, tennis player (b. 1868)
- September 28
  - Bert Lytell, actor (b. 1885)
  - Pat McCarran, Democratic U.S. Senator from Nevada from 1933 to 1954 (b. 1876)

=== October–December ===
- October 3 – Herbert Prior, actor (b. 1867)
- October 9 – Robert H. Jackson, U.S. Supreme Court associate justice, chief prosecutor at the Nuremberg Trials (b. 1892)
- October 12 – George Welch, aviator (b. 1918)
- October 19 – Hugh Duffy, baseball player (b. 1866)
- October 22 – Earl Whitehill, baseball player (b. 1899)
- October 30 – Wilbur Shaw, racing driver (b. 1902)
- November 15 – Lionel Barrymore, actor (b. 1878)
- November 16 – Albert Francis Blakeslee, botanist (b. 1874)
- November 20 – Clyde Cessna, aviator and aircraft designer and manufacturer (b. 1879)
- November 22
  - Jess McMahon, professional boxing and wrestling promoter (b. 1882)
  - Moroni Olsen, actor (b. 1889)
- November 29
  - Enrico Fermi, nuclear physicist (b. 1901 in Italy)
  - Dink Johnson, Dixieland jazz performer (b. 1892)
- December 1 – Fred Rose, songwriter (b. 1898)
- December 8 – Gladys George, actress (b. 1904)
- December 15 – Papa Celestin, jazz bandleader, singer, cornetist, and trumpeter (b. 1884)
- December 25
  - Johnny Ace, R&B singer (shooting accident) (b. 1929)
  - Liberty Hyde Bailey, botanist (b. 1858)
- December 27 – Adolph Otto Niedner, cartridge designer (b. 1863)

== See also ==
- List of American films of 1954
- Timeline of United States history (1950–1969)
