= Paul Griffin =

Paul Griffin may refer to:

- Paul Griffin (basketball) (born 1954), American basketball player
- Paul Griffin (boxer) (born 1971), Irish boxer
- Paul Griffin (Gaelic footballer)
- Paul Griffin (musician) (1937–2000), pianist
- Paul Griffin (rower) (born 1979), Irish rower
- Paul A. Griffin, accountant, academic, and author
- Paul Griffin (journalist), Australian television and radio journalist

== See also ==
- Griffin (surname)
- Paul Griffen, New Zealand-born rugby union player who represented Italy
