= William Griffin =

William, Willie, Will, Billy or Bill Griffin may refer to:

== Arts and entertainment ==
- William Griffin (painter) (1811–1870), New Zealand painter
- Billy Griffin (born 1950), American singer-songwriter
- Rakim (William Michael Griffin Jr., born 1968), American rapper
- Bill Griffin (musician), American mandolinist and luthier

== Religion ==
- William Richard Griffin (1882–1944), American Roman Catholic bishop
- William A. Griffin (Roman Catholic bishop) (1885–1950), American Roman Catholic Bishop of Trenton
- William A. Griffin (Christian churches and churches of Christ) (fl. 1980s–2000s), Christian preacher and President of Mid-Atlantic Christian University

== Sports ==
- Willie Griffin (1922–1983), Irish hurler
- Billy Griffin (footballer) (born 1940), English footballer, see List of Sheffield Wednesday F.C. players
- William Griffin (rugby) (fl. 1950s), Welsh rugby union and rugby league footballer

== Others ==
- William Henry Griffin (1812–1900), Canadian civil servant
- William D. Griffin (1936–2011), American historian, author, and educator
- William Griffin (geologist), recipient of the Clarke Medal for 2013 in the field of geology

== See also ==
- Griffin (surname)
