= Nazarbayev Intellectual Schools =

Network of schools in Kazakhstan

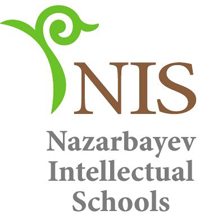
- Kazakhstan

Information
- Type: Intellectual Schools of Physics and Mathematics, schools of Chemistry and Biology, International Baccalaureate
- Established: 2008 - today
- Language: Kazakh, Russian, English
- Website: nis.edu.kz

The Nazarbayev Intellectual Schools (NIS) is a network of schools for students of age 11 to 18 throughout Kazakhstan. The schools are named after Nursultan Abishuly Nazarbayev, former president of Kazakhstan, who has promoted the idea as a means of developing the intellectual life of the country. Previously, each school focused primarily on a specific set of subjects: either physical sciences and mathematics, or chemical and biological sciences, as well as foreign languages. However, this division later faded, and schools were renamed after districts they are located in, and now most schools share the same curriculum based on Cambridge O Level and A Level, except for NIS IB in Astana. Instruction is trilingual, in Kazakh, Russian and English.

== Partnerships ==
The program was initially set up with the assistance of faculty members from the University of Pennsylvania Graduate School of Education. Subsequently, Nazarbayev Intellectual Schools partnered with the University of Cambridge Faculty of Education on curriculum development; Cambridge Assessment on design of the assessment system; CiTO, Netherlands on the testing and measurement; and Johns Hopkins University on working with talented youth. Some schools were later accredited by CIS

== Schools ==
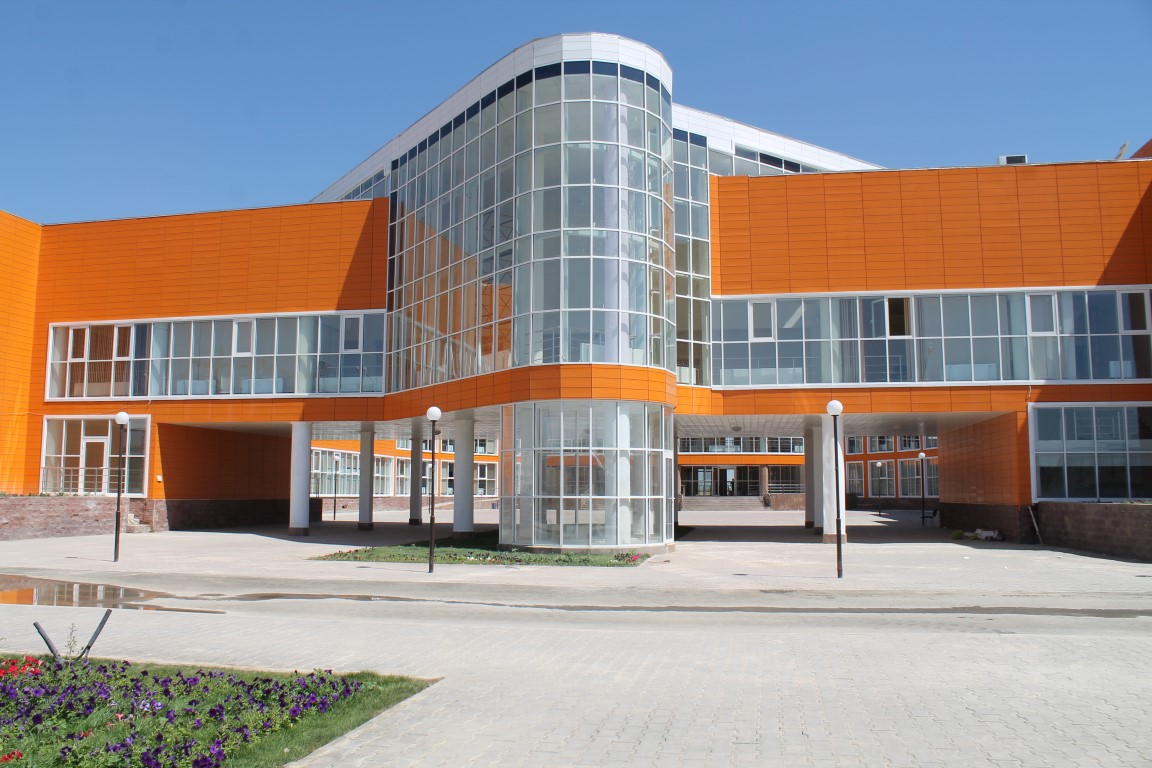
Nazarbayev Intellectual school in Shymkent

Currently there are 20 NIS or associated schools located in the following localities:

- Astana: Two schools (NIS Astana PhM, NIS Astana) and International Baccalaureate.
- Semey: One school (NIS Semey PhM)
- Kokshetau: One school (NIS Kokshetau PhM)
- Taldykorgan: One school (NIS Taldykorgan PhM)
- Uralsk: One school (NIS Uralsk PhM)
- Oskemen: One school (NIS Oskemen ChB)
- Aktobe: One school (NIS Aktobe PhM)
- Karaganda: One school (NIS Karaganda ChB)
- Shymkent: Two schools (NIS Shymkent PhM and NIS Shymkent ChB)
- Taraz: One school (NIS Taraz PhM)
- Kyzylorda: One school (NIS Kyzylorda ChB)
- Pavlodar: One school (NIS Pavlodar ChB)
- Atyrau: One school (NIS Atyrau ChB)
- Almaty: Two schools (NIS Almaty PhM and NIS Almaty ChB)
- Kostanay: One school (NIS Kostanai PhM)
- Petropavlovsk: One school (NIS Petropavlovsk ChB)
- Aktau: One school (NIS Aktau ChB)
- Turkestan: One school (NIS Turkestan ChB)

Currently NIS operates twenty intellectual schools throughout the country, in addition to an international school and specialist mathematics school in Astana.

== Conferences ==
The NIS International Conference is one of the largest educational conferences in Central Asia, and the largest focusing exclusively on preschool, primary and secondary education, typically attracting around 1000 participants. Previous keynote speakers have included Colleen McLaughlin, Patrick Griffin, Fred Genesee, William Schmidt, Richard Phelps, Miho Taguma, David Bridges, and John Elliott.

== Criticism ==
The Nazarbayev network has been criticized for its concentration on only the best and brightest at the expense of the bulk of the rest of the student population.
