= Arthur Griffiths =

Arthur Griffiths may refer to:

- Arthur Griffiths (author) (1838–1908), prison administrator and author
- Arthur Griffiths (footballer, born 1879) (1879–1955), footballer for Bristol Rovers and Notts County
- Arthur Griffiths (cyclist) (1881–?), British Olympic cyclist
- Arthur Griffiths (footballer, born 1885) (1885–1944), footballer for Stoke City and Oldham
- Arthur Griffiths (footballer, born 1908) (1914–1995), footballer for Torquay, Rochdale and Stoke City
- Arthur Griffiths (businessman) (born 1957), Canadian businessman, philanthropist, and former candidate for political office
- Arthur Griffiths (rugby league), Australian rugby league player

== See also ==
- Arthur Griffin (disambiguation)
- Arthur Griffith (disambiguation)
- Arfon Griffiths
