= Rob Griffin =

Rob Griffin may refer to:

- Rob Griffin, character in Janus (TV series)
- Rob Griffin, member of the band Howards Alias

== See also ==
- Robert Griffin (disambiguation)
- Bob Griffin (disambiguation)
