= Patrick Griffin =

Patrick or Pat Griffin may refer to:

- Patrick Griffin (academic), Australian professor of education
- Patrick Griffin (politician) (1841–?), American politician
- Pat Griffin (1944–2019), former Gaelic football player
- Pat Griffin (baseball) (1893–1927), pitcher
- Pat Griffin (sledge hockey) (born 1960), Canadian sledge hockey player

== See also ==
- Griffin (surname)
