= Francis Griffith =

Francis Griffith may refer to:

- Francis Griffith (police officer) (1878–1942), Inspector General, Bombay Police and Chief Constable, New Scotland Yard
- Francis Huntly Griffith (1885–1958), Welsh-born tea planter in Ceylon, member of the Parliament of Ceylon (1947–1952)
- Francis M. Griffith (1849–1927), U.S. Representative from Indiana
- Francis Llewellyn Griffith (1862–1934), British Egyptologist

== See also ==
- Frank Griffith (disambiguation)
- Francis Griffin (disambiguation)
