= Arthur Griffin =

Arthur Griffin may refer to:

- Arthur Griffin (architect) (1883–1967), New Zealand architect
- Arthur Griffin (cricketer) (1887–1962), English cricketer
- Arthur Griffin (footballer) (1871–1945), English footballer
- Arthur Griffin (photographer) (1903–2001), American photographer
- A. Harry Griffin (1911–2004), British journalist and mountaineer
- A. J. Griffin (born 1988), American baseball pitcher
- Arthur Griffin, a character in American TV series Big Time Rush

== See also ==
- James Arthur Griffin better known as Jimmy Griffin
- Arthur
- Griffin (surname)
- Archie Griffin (born 1954), American football player
- Arthur Griffith (disambiguation)
- Arthur Griffiths (disambiguation)
