= Edward Griffin =

Edward, Eddie or Ed Griffin may refer to:

- Edward Griffin (attorney), Solicitor General and Attorney General for England and Wales, 1545–1559
- Edward Griffin (MP) (1587–1681), English Member of Parliament 1640–1644, and Treasurer of the Chamber, 1660–1679
- Edward Griffin, 1st Baron Griffin of Braybrooke, English Treasurer of the Chamber, 1679–1689
- Edward Dorr Griffin (1770–1837), American clergyman and president of Williams College, 1821–1836
- G. Edward Griffin (born 1931), American film producer, author, and conspiracy theorist
- Eddie Griffin (born 1968), American actor and comedian
- Eddie Griffin (basketball) (1982–2007), American professional basketball player
- Eddie Griffin (coach), American wrestling coach at Clemson University and University of Central Oklahoma
- Ted Griffin (orca capturer) (Edward Griffin), aquarium owner and entrepreneur

== See also ==
- Ted Griffin (born 1970), American screenwriter
- Ted Griffin (footballer) (1913–1998), Australian rules footballer
