= David Griffin =

David Griffin may refer to:

- David Griffin (actor) (born 1943), English actor
- David Griffin (American football) (born 1991), American football offensive lineman
- David Griffin (athlete) (1905–1944), Canadian athlete and journalist
- David Griffin (basketball) (born 1973), American basketball executive
- David Griffin (hurler) (born 1997), Irish hurler
- David Griffin (politician) (1915–2004), Australian politician
- David Griffin (swimmer) (born 1967), Australian swimmer
- David Ray Griffin (1939–2022), American philosopher and theologian
- Dave Lee Travis (born David Patrick Griffin; 1945), English radio presenter and DJ
