= Marty Griffin (disambiguation) =

L. Martin Griffin (1920–2024) was an American environmentalist and conservationist

Marty Griffin may refer to:

- Marty Griffin (baseball) (1901–1951), American pitcher in Major League Baseball
- Marty Griffin (journalist) (born 1959), American investigative reporter and radio talk show host

== See also ==
- Martin Griffin (disambiguation)
