= Surname map =

Map showing distribution of surnames

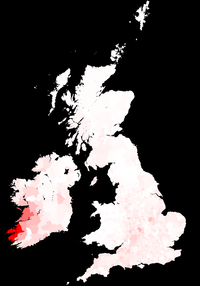
A map of the surname Griffin in the U.K., Ireland and the Isle of Man.

Surname maps are maps which display and indicate the highest concentration of residents with a particular surname, or set of surnames. This information can be useful for studying the current or historic distribution of surnames, and occasionally their origin. Surname maps are generally created using population lists, such as censuses, electoral rolls, taxation records and telephone directories. Where the surname concentration is at the highest, is useful to the genealogical researcher in indicating the region a given spelling of the name was first adopted.
