= Frank Griffith =

Frank Griffith may refer to:

- Frank Griffith (cricketer) (born 1968), English cricketer
- F. Kingsley Griffith (1889–1962), British politician, barrister and judge
- Frank Griffith (baseball) (1872–1908), Major League baseball player

== See also ==
- Francis Griffith (disambiguation)
