= Arthur Griffith (disambiguation) =

Arthur Griffith (1871–1922) was the founder and third leader of Sinn Féin.

Arthur Griffith may also refer to:

- Sir Arthur Griffith (Australian politician) (1913–1982), Australian politician; member of the Western Australian Legislative Assembly
- Arthur F. Griffith (1880–1911), calculating prodigy
- Arthur Hill Griffith (1861–1946), Australian politician; minister in the Government of New South Wales
- Arthur Troyte Griffith (1864–1942), British architect immortalized in the Enigma Variations

== See also ==
- Arthur Griffin (disambiguation)
- Arthur Griffiths (disambiguation)
