= Willie Griffin =

Irish hurler

Personal information
- Native name: Liam Mac Dhuifinn (Irish)
- Born: 21 June 1922 Shanballymore, County Cork, Ireland
- Died: 16 March 1983 (aged 60) Mallow, County Cork, Ireland
- Occupation: Farmer
- Height: 5 ft 9 in (175 cm)

Sport
- Sport: Hurling
- Position: Right wing-forward
Club
- Years: Club
- Shanballymore
Club titles
- Cork titles: 0
Inter-county
Years	County	Apps (scores)
1950-1952	Cork	4 (0-02)
Inter-county titles
- Munster titles: 1
- All-Irelands: 1
- NHL: 0

William Griffin (21 June 1922 – 16 March 1983) was an Irish hurler who played for club side Shanballymore and at inter-county level with the Cork senior hurling team.

== Career ==
A member of the Shanballymore club, Griffin enjoyed his first club success in 1942 when he was part of the County Junior Championship-winning team. He later claimed two County Intermediate Championship titles. Griffin earned a call-up to the Cork senior hurling team for the 1951 Munster Championship and made his debut at midfield in a defeat of Clare. He won a Munster Championship medal as a reserve in 1952, before claiming an All-Ireland title on the field of play after a defeat of Dublin in the 1952 final.

== Personal life and death ==
Although born in Shanballymore, County Cork, Griffin spent most of his adult life working as a farmer in nearby Killavullen. He died at St. Colman's Hospital in Mallow on 16 March 1983.

== Honours ==
=== Shanballymore ===
- Cork Intermediate Hurling Championship: 1943, 1951
- Cork Junior Hurling Championship: 1942

=== Cork ===
- All-Ireland Senior Hurling Championship: 1952
- Munster Senior Hurling Championship: 1952
