= 1954 Eureka earthquake =

Earthquake in California, United States

- Location within California
- UTC time: 1954-12-21 19:56:29
- ISC event: 891371
- USGS-ANSS: ComCat
- Local date: December 21, 1954; 71 years ago
- Local time: 11:56 am Pacific Time
- Magnitude: 6.5 M_{w}
- Epicenter: 40.78°N 123.87°W
- Type: Unknown
- Areas affected: North Coast (California); United States
- Total damage: $2 million
- Max. intensity: MMI VII (Very strong)
- Casualties: 1 death, 50 injuries

The 1954 Eureka earthquake occurred at 11:56 am on December 21, just east of Eureka and Arcata, California in the United States. The unknown type shock had a moment magnitude of 6.5 and a maximum Mercalli intensity of VII (Very strong). Buildings swayed, windows were broken, and the Humboldt County Courthouse collapsed. A total of US$2 million damages was counted, with one death and 50 injuries.

== Geology ==
The earthquake was located within the Franciscan subduction complex, taking up northwestern California. The history of the subduction complex spans for about 150 million years, with significant events happening in this time period. Regularly, faults are hidden beneath the ocean, but at this particular subduction complex, the faults can be spotted piercing through land. The faults are considered active, with evidence of rupture originating within the last 10,000 years.

== Earthquake ==
The earthquake struck Eureka, Arcata, and the surrounding Humboldt County on December 21, 1954, at approximately 11:56 am. The earthquake had a magnitude of 6.5 M_{w} with an unknown depth. There have been an estimated 10 attempts to locate the earthquake. Contributing to this problem was the reduction of operating seismic stations within Humboldt County, with a total of two seismic stations. Other nearby seismic stations also recorded the earthquake, though these attempts were not that useful. For the earthquake, a total of two radio signals were sent, which helped identify the time of the earthquake.

=== Damage ===
In local areas, chimneys toppled, windows shattered, and ancient buildings swayed dangerously. The earthquake caused the Humboldt County courthouse to be deemed uninhabitable, prompting reconstruction of the building. The Sweasey Dam broke, threatening nearby areas. In addition, a 65,000 U.S. gal (250,000 L) water tank fell, located near Fortuna, California.

=== Aftermath ===
Soldiers of the United States Armed Forces inspected some harbors of Humboldt County for damage. Damage was found in the jetties, prompting repair money costing US$300,000. A total of US$2 million damages was counted, with one death and 50 injuries.
