= James Griffin =

Jim, Jimmy or James Griffin may refer to:

== Arts and entertainment ==
- Jimmy Griffin (James Arthur Griffin, 1943–2005), American musician, member of Bread
- James J. Griffin (born 1949), American writer of Western novels
- James Griffin (songwriter), Australian singer / songwriter

== Law and politics ==
- James Griffin (Irish politician) (1899–1959), Irish Fianna Fáil politician
- James D. Griffin (1929–2008), American politician; mayor of Buffalo, New York
- James W. Griffin (born 1935), American politician in Iowa
- James Griffin (Australian politician), member of the New South Wales Legislative Assembly

== Sports ==
- James Griffin (American football coach) (1918–1992), American football coach
- James Griffin (defensive back) (born 1961), American football player
- Jim Griffin (footballer) (born 1967), Scottish footballer for Motherwell FC

== Others ==
- James Aloysius Griffin (1883–1948), American prelate of the Roman Catholic Church
- James Bennett Griffin (1905–1997), American archaeologist
- James Griffin (philosopher) (1933–2019), American philosopher at University of Oxford
- James Anthony Griffin (born 1934), American prelate of the Roman Catholic Church
- James D. Griffin (oncologist), American physician-scientist and cancer expert

== Other uses ==
- James Griffin Stadium, a stadium named after James S. Griffin, the first black police captain in St. Paul, MN

== See also ==
- James Griffin Boswell (1882–1952), founder of the J. G. Boswell Company
- Jim Griffen, New Zealand rugby league player
