= Harry Griffin (cricketer) =

English cricketer

Personal information
- Full name: Harry Griffin
- Born: 21 April 1873; Street, Somerset, England
- Died: 26 September 1938 (aged 65); Bristol, England
- Nickname: Joe
- Batting: Left-handed
- Bowling: Slow left-arm orthodox
- Role: Bowler

Domestic team information
- Years: Team
- 1898–1999: Somerset

Career statistics
Competition	First-class
Matches	4
Runs scored	69
Batting average	9.85
100s/50s	0/0
Top score	23
Balls bowled	595
Wickets	14
Bowling average	15.50
5 wickets in innings	1
10 wickets in match	0
Best bowling	6/40
Catches/stumpings	2/–
- Source: ESPNcricinfo, 23 October 2017

Harry "Joe" Griffin (21 April 1873 – 26 September 1938) played first-class county cricket for Somerset in 1898 and 1899. As a slow left-arm bowler, he was employed as a professional by Todmorden Cricket Club in the Lancashire League before being recruited by Somerset. He played four matches for the county, but his bowling action was questioned, with suggestions that he was guilty of throwing. He continued to play club cricket for Street for many years after.

== Life and career ==
Harry Griffin, known as "Joe" in cricketing circles, was born in Street, Somerset on 21 April 1873, born into a family of shoemakers who worked for Clarks. He followed his family into the trade, but also sought employment as a professional cricketer. In the late 1890s, he was taken on by Todmorden Cricket Club in the Lancashire League as their professional. He was invited to play a trial match with Somerset County Cricket Club in 1898, and after that was employed by the club on a professional basis. Although he was predominantly a slow left-arm orthodox spin bowler, Griffin made his debut for Somerset in 1898 as a top-order batsman, and did not bowl. Batting at number four in each innings, he scored five runs in the match, which Somerset lost by five wickets to Lancashire.

In his first of three games in 1899, he was the eighth bowler used as Gloucestershire replied to a Somerset first innings score of 476 with an opening stand of 148; Griffin, however, then took six wickets for 40 runs in 19 five-ball overs, and a further three when Gloucestershire followed on, to finish with match figures of nine for 107. Despite this success, Griffin, as a professional, was unable to secure a regular place in cash-strapped Somerset's team, and played only two further matches. In the second of these, against Yorkshire, he took the wickets of David Denton, Rockley Wilson, Lord Hawke and Schofield Haigh and made his highest first-class score of 23. But he did not appear in first-class cricket again.
