= The Treasury of Science Fiction Classics =

- Dust-jacket from the first edition
- Editor: Harold Kuebler
- Cover artist: Richard Powers
- Language: English
- Genre: Science fiction
- Publisher: Hanover House
- Publication date: 1954
- Publication place: United States
- Media type: Print (hardback)
- Pages: 694
- OCLC: 2581070

The Treasury of Science Fiction Classics is an anthology of science fiction stories, edited by Harold E. Kuebler, published in hardcover by Hanover House in 1954 with dust jacket art by Richard Powers. A Science Fiction Book Club edition followed later that year, but the volume has not otherwise been reprinted.

== Contents ==
- "Introduction", Harold W. Kuebler
- "The Conversation of Eiros and Charmion", Edgar Allan Poe (Burton’s Gentlemen’s Magazine 1839)
- "The Star", H. G. Wells (The Graphic Christmas 1897)
- When Worlds Collide (excerpt), Edwin Balmer & Philip Wylie (1932)
- "The Maracot Deep", Arthur Conan Doyle (The Saturday Evening Post 1927)
- "Round the Moon", Jules Verne (Journal des Debats Politiques et Litteraires 1869)
- "The Last Terrestrials" Olaf Stapledon (Last and First Men 1930)
- "The Machine Stops", E. M. Forster (Oxford and Cambridge Review 1909)
- "R.U.R.", Karel Capek (pl, 1921
- Brave New World (excerpt), Aldous Huxley (1932)
- Invasion from Mars, Howard Koch (1938)
- "Edison’s Conquest of Mars" (abridged), Garrett P. Serviss (New York Evening Journal 1898)
- "The Martians", Olaf Stapledon (Last and First Men 1930)
- The Time Machine (abridged), H. G. Wells (The New Review 1895)
- "The Curious Case of Benjamin Button" (abridged), F. Scott Fitzgerald (Collier's 1922)
- "The Rat", S. Fowler Wright (Weird Tales 1929)
- "The Damned Thing", Ambrose Bierce (Tales from New York Town Topics 1893)
- "Mr. Strenberry’s Tale", J. B. Priestley (The London Magazine 1930)

"Mr. Strenberry's Tale" was originally published under the title "Doomsday".

== Reception ==
J. Francis McComas, writing in The New York Times, panned the anthology as "the most routine of scissors-and-paste jobs, done without any editorial skill whatsoever." P. Schuyler Miller similarly declared "I don't, for the life of me, know who this anthology is for", faulting its editor's selection of "overly familiar," sometimes "archaic" stories.
