= David Edward Maust =

American serial killer

- Mugshot
- Born: April 5, 1954; Connellsville, Pennsylvania, U.S.
- Died: January 20, 2006 (aged 51); Crown Point, Indiana, U.S.
- Cause of death: Suicide by hanging
- Other name: Crazy Dave
- Convictions: Military; Involuntary manslaughter Larceny; Illinois; Murder; Indiana; Murder (3 counts)
- Penalty: Military; 4 years imprisonment Illinois; 35 years imprisonment Indiana; Life imprisonment without parole

Details
- Victims: 5 (one by accident)
- Span of crimes: 1974 – September 10, 2003
- Country: Germany, United States
- States: Hesse, Texas, Illinois, Indiana
- Date apprehended: December 10, 2003

David Edward Maust (April 5, 1954 – January 20, 2006) was an American serial killer who targeted predominantly male teenagers. His murders occurred in Germany and the United States. In 1984, he was sentenced to 35 years in prison; he was released under probation in June 1999. Once released and off of probation he continued murdering, leading to his final arrest and sentencing to three life terms without the possibility of parole.

In January 2006, about a month after his last sentencing, Maust killed himself by hanging in his jail cell. Jail workers found a suicide note in his cell in which he confessed to five killings, and apologized to the victims' families. Maust was 51 years old.

== Early life ==
David Edward Maust was born in Connellsville, Pennsylvania, in 1954. His parents were George and Eva Maust. The surname Maust is of Amish origins. His father divorced and left his mother when Maust was 7. Maust's father was orphaned at the age of 12, and was raised in foster homes. According to records his mother was mentally ill and diagnosed as psychotic.

Maust was confined in a mental institution at the age of nine at the request of his mother. His mother claimed he set fire to his younger brother's bed, and later tried to drown him. However, his mother was described by a social worker as "disturbed," "psychotic," "functioning marginally," "needy," and "narcissistic." She had spent a month in a mental hospital in Pennsylvania. A later report on Maust said that the institution where he was confined was filled with children who were there more often than not because family members were mentally ill and couldn't, or wouldn't, take care of them. At the institution it was felt that Maust's mother simply "dumped" him there.

Regarding his mother's stated reasons for bringing him there, "staff there did not observe the lying, stealing and out-of-control behavior." His mother was asked to be specific about trouble Maust caused during home visits, but she failed to do so. She ended up saying "she just doesn't want him at home."

In fact, Maust did have an early history of violence, having choked (but not killed) two friends for no reason. His brother remembered Maust beat a squirrel to death with a baseball bat "for fun".

The brother recalled that Maust had been molested at an early age. At the hospital Maust was well-behaved, but despondent over his mother's failure to visit him with any regularity. After Maust left the hospital, he came to live at a children's home where, at age 13, he was subjected to unwanted sexual advances by another boy.

As a young adult, he worked in construction for his uncle in Wrightsville, Georgia, and was a skilled worker, but was eventually fired after crashing a company truck.

Maust tried to return home to his mother, but she did not want him to return and in fact threatened him with a knife. His mother took him to an Army recruiter and in 1971, at age eighteen, he enlisted in the Army. He completed Basic Training at Fort Lewis and AIT at Fort Ord, and in 1972 was stationed in Frankfurt, Germany. He served as a cook, and was by all accounts an able serviceman.

== Crimes ==
In 1974, while stationed in Germany, Maust killed a 13-year-old boy, James McClister, the child of American expatriates, and was court-martialed and convicted of involuntary manslaughter and larceny (he claimed that the boy's death was the result of an accident on a moped which he had stolen.) He was sentenced to four years of prison at Fort Leavenworth. Maust requested not to be paroled, but was nevertheless released in 1977.

In 1979, in his apartment in Chicago, Maust stabbed a friend while he was sleeping. He was tried for attempted murder. In his diary, Maust said he lied on the witness stand and said he didn't do it and was found not guilty.

In 1981, Maust decided to find and kill the man who had molested him at the children's home when they were both juveniles. He was unable to find him, but encountered 15-year-old Donald Jones and decided to kill him instead. Maust eventually drowned Jones in an Elgin quarry. In Texas, this same year Maust stabbed a 14-year-old boy, was arrested, and sentenced to five years for "causing bodily injury to a child."

In 1982, while in jail in Texas, Maust was extradited to Illinois for the Jones murder. A Cook County sheriff's police officer wrote on a cover sheet of the extradition papers sent to Texas: "Bad Guy. Gacy Type." Originally found unfit to stand trial, he was held in mental health facilities. Ultimately, after those hospitalizations and roughly ten years in jail awaiting trial, Maust pleaded guilty in 1994 and was sentenced to 35 years. However, he received credit for the 12 years he was held and time off for good behavior; thus he served 17 years altogether and was released in 1999.

A fact sheet sent to the Illinois Department of Corrections by the Cook County state's attorney's office after this conviction said, "This inmate is most likely the most dangerous inmate you will house." The prosecutor urged that Maust be kept incarcerated, but under the law, Maust was eligible for this early release. Maust wrote a five-page letter to the Illinois Department of Corrections requesting to not be released from prison. "He did not meet the criteria to be placed in any other kind of facility," said Dee Dee Short, a Department of Corrections spokeswoman.

In 2001, Maust hit an acquaintance six times in the back of the head with a metal pipe in another attempted murder, but he was not prosecuted because the acquaintance, although he reported the incident to police, did not want to pursue prosecution.

On December 12, 2003, Maust was arrested for the strangling death of James Raganyi, 16. Raganyi's body was found encased in concrete in Maust's basement in Hammond, Indiana. He was later charged with the deaths of Michael Dennis, 13, and Nick James, 19, similarly wrapped in plastic and encased in concrete. Both Raganyi and Dennis were reported missing on September 10, 2003. In November 2005, he pleaded guilty for the three murders and was sentenced to three life terms.

When I got locked up in the Army, and then especially when I got locked up in 1981, I knew I should never be let out again. I [didn't] know how to act around other people and I was never taught how to make friends and keep them. When an inmate says he [doesn’t] want out, I hope that somebody listens.

— David Maust, diary notes October 30, 2005

== Aftermath ==
In January 2006, about a month after his last sentencing, Maust killed himself by hanging in his jail cell. Jail workers found a suicide note in his cell in which he confessed to five killings, and apologized to the victims’ families. Maust was 51 years old.

The Maust case helped lead Indiana public officials to pursue a state amendment requiring for a violent offender registry for convicted murderers, suggesting that, if available, the registry might have reduced the chance of Maust's continuance of murder upon release.

"Indiana Code Section 11-8-8-7 provides that sex or violent offenders must register with local law enforcement authority. Indiana Code Section 11-8-8-5(18) defines a "sex or violent offender" to include a person convicted of murder."

The Indiana Code Section 11-8-8 was enacted in July 2006, as of this date there are four types of offenders:

- Sexually Violent Predators (defined in IC 35-38-1-7.5)
- Offenders Against Children (defined in IC 35-42-4-11)
- Sex Offenders (defined in IC 11-8-8-4.5)
- Violent Offenders (defined in IC 11-8-8-5 persons convicted of Murder or Voluntary Manslaughter)

There are two registry terms of enrollment; 10 years and life.

== In popular media ==
In 2009, an official biography entitled Blood Stained: When No One Comes Looking was released by Dory Maust. Dory, who is married to a distant relative of Maust's, was contacted by Maust's brother Jeffrey and asked to write a book about him. She decided against this, instead choosing to independently work on a biography with Maust's attorney Tom Vanes.

== See also ==
- List of serial killers in the United States
