= Arthur Griffin (cricketer) =

English cricketer

Arthur Wilfrid Michael Stewart Griffin (19 February 1887 – 29 June 1962) was an English first-class cricketer active 1910 who played for Middlesex and Cambridge University. He was born in Iquique, Chile; died in East Grinstead.
