= David Griffin (hurler) =

Irish hurler

Personal information
- Native name: Daithí Ó Gríofa (Irish)
- Born: 14 May 1997 (age 29) Carrigaline, County Cork, Ireland
- Occupation: Student
- Height: 6 ft 2 in (188 cm)

Sport
- Sport: Hurling
- Position: Left wing-back
Club
- Years: Club
- 2015-present: Carrigaline
Club titles
- Cork titles: 0
College
- Years: College
- University College Cork
College titles
- Fitzgibbon titles: 2
Inter-county*
Years	County	Apps (scores)
2017-present	Cork	0 (0-00)
Inter-county titles
- Munster titles: 2
- All-Irelands: 0
- NHL: 0
- All Stars: 0
- *Inter County team apps and scores correct as of 11:01, 8 July 2018.

David Griffin (born 14 May 1997) is an Irish hurler who plays as a full-back for club sides Carrigaline and University College Cork and at inter-county level with the Cork senior hurling team. He usually lines out as a left wing-back.

== Playing career ==
=== St. Francis College ===
In secondary school, Griffin played as a dual player with St. Francis College in Rochestown. Having played both codes at every grade, he was at Centre Back on both of the college's senior teams that lost the Harty Cup and Corn Uí Mhuirí finals in 2015.

=== University College Cork ===
On 23 February 2019, Griffin lined out at left wing-back for University College Cork when they faced Mary Immaculate College in the Fitzgibbon Cup final. He scored a point from play in the 2–21 to 0–13 victory.

Griffin played in a second successive Fitzgibbon Cup final on 12 February 2020. Lining out at left corner-back, he ended the game with a second successive winners' medal after the 0–18 to 2–11 defeat of the Institute of Technology, Carlow.

=== Carrigaline ===
Griffin joined the Carrigaline club at a young age and played both hurling and Gaelic football at juvenile and underage levels. In 2014 he was at centre-back in the final as Carrigaline defeated St. Finbarr's to take the Premier 1 MFC title. Griffin was still eligible for the minor grade when he was added to the club's top adult team. On 18 October 2015, he was introduced as a substitute in the 43rd minute in Carrigaline's one-point defeat of St Michael's in the premier intermediate championship final.

=== Cork ===
==== Minor and under-21 ====
Griffin first played for Cork at minor level in 2015, however, his sole season in that grade ended without success with a defeats by Limerick. On 23 June 2016, Griffin made his first appearance for the Cork under-21 hurling team in a seven-point defeat by Limerick. He also played in Cork's championship campaign the following year.

On 4 July 2018, Griffin won a Munster medal after Cork's 2–23 to 1–13 defeat of Tipperary in the final. On 26 August 2018, he was at full-back for Cork's 3–13 to 1-16 All-Ireland final defeat by Tipperary in what was his last game in the grade.

==== Senior ====
Griffin was called up to the Cork senior panel in October 2016 and made his debut at right corner-back in a Munster League defeat of Kerry on 8 January 2017. He was introduced as a substitute for Damien Cahalane in Cork's subsequent league final defeat of Limerick on 29 January 2017. Griffin made his first start in a National League defeat of Clare on 11 February 2017 and was later added to Cork's championship panel. On 9 July 2017, he won his first Munster medal as an unused substitute following a 1–25 to 1–20 defeat of Clare in the final.

On 1 July 2018, Griffin won a second successive Munster medal as a substitute following a 2–24 to 3–19 defeat of Clare in the final.

== Career statistics ==
=== Inter-county ===
As of match played 16 March 2019.

Team	Year	National League			Munster		All-Ireland		Total	
Team	Year	Division	Apps	Score	Apps	Score	Apps	Score	Apps	Score
Cork	2017	Division 1A	3	0-00	0	0-00	0	0-00	3	0-00
Cork	2018	Division 1A	0	0-00	0	0-00	0	0-00	0	0-00
Cork	2019	Division 1A	1	0-00	0	0-00	0	0-00	1	0-00
Total			4	0-00	0	0-00	0	0-00	4	0-00

== Honours ==
University College Cork

- Fitzgibbon Cup (2): 2019, 2020

Carrigaline

- Cork Premier Intermediate Football Championship (1): 2015
- Cork Premier 1 Minor Football Championship (1): 2014

Cork

- Munster Senior Hurling Championship (2): 2017, 2018
- Munster Senior Hurling League (1): 2017
- Munster Under-21 Hurling Championship (1): 2018
