= Thomas Griffin =

Thomas, Tom, or Tommy Griffin may refer to:

== Sports ==
- Thomas Griffin (baseball) (1857–1933), American baseball player
- Tom Griffin (rugby) (1884–1950), Australian rugby union player
- Tom Griffin (boxer) (1913–1984), British boxer
- Tom Griffin (baseball) (born 1948), American baseball player
- Tommy Griffin (born 1978), Irish Gaelic football player

== Others ==
- Sir Thomas Griffin (1323–1360), English knight
- Thomas Griffin (died 1615) (1580–1615), English landowner
- Thomas Griffin (pirate) (fl. 1691), English pirate and privateer active off New England
- Thomas Griffin (Royal Navy officer) (1692–1771), British admiral and member of parliament for Arundel
- Thomas Griffin (politician) (1773–1837), American lawyer and politician from Virginia
- Thomas Griffin (Australian gold commissioner) (1832–1868), Australian police officer executed in 1868
- Thomas Griffin (farmer) (1889–1915), African American farmer executed in 1915
- Thomas Griffin (organ builder) (c. 1706–1771), British organ builder and professor of music
- Tom Griffin (aviator) (1916–2013), American aviator
- Tom Griffin (playwright) (1946–2018), American playwright
- Thomas B. Griffin (1858–1918), American painter
