= Paul A. Griffin =

Accountant, academic, and author

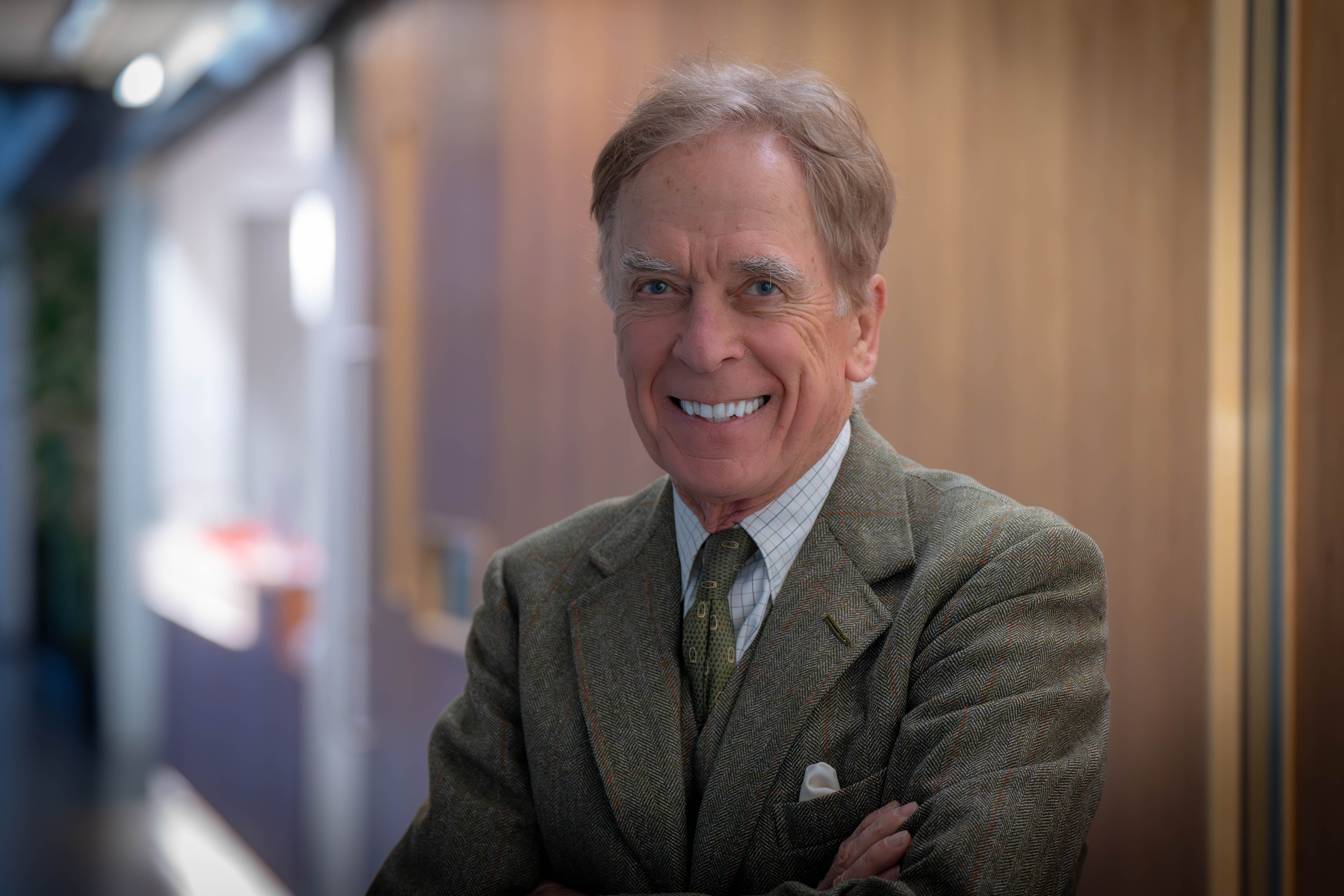
- Occupations: Accountant, academic, and author

Academic background
- Education: M.A. in Operations Research and Economic Theory; Ph.D. in Accounting
- Alma mater: Victoria University of Wellington; The Ohio State University

Academic work
- Discipline: Corporate disclosure Capital market behavior Environmental accounting
- Institutions: Graduate School of Management, University of California, Davis

Paul A. Griffin is an accountant, academic, and author. He is Distinguished Professor Emeritus at the Graduate School of Management, University of California, Davis.

Griffin is most known for his research on how corporate information impacts financial market prices. He has also studied how investors respond to accounting regulations, corporate social responsibility (CSR) disclosures, and climate-related events such as wildfires and heat waves, as well as the disclosure practices of R&D-intensive firms. In addition to his journal articles, he has authored numerous monographs, including Usefulness to Investors and Creditors of Information Provided by Financial Reporting, Cases in Corporate Financial Reporting, and Accounting for the Translation of Foreign Currencies: The Effects of Statement 52 on Equity Analysts.

Griffin is a Fellow of Chartered Accountants Australia and New Zealand and has been co-editor of the journal Accounting Horizons.

== Education ==
After completing his baccalaureate education at the Victoria University of Wellington, New Zealand, Griffin moved from his birth country to the United States, where he completed his M.A. in Operations Research and Economic Theory in 1973 and earned his Ph.D. in accounting in 1974 from the Fisher College of Business at The Ohio State University.

== Career ==
Griffin began his academic career in 1974 as an assistant professor of accounting at Stanford University's Graduate School of Business. In 1981, he joined the University of California, Davis, as an associate professor of Management and founding faculty member of the newly formed UC Davis Graduate School of Management. He advanced to the position of Professor of Management in 1984. In 2017, the University of California, Davis, appointed him to the title of Distinguished Professor of Management. He also holds the position of Honorary Professor in the Department of Accounting and Finance at the University of Otago and has been serving as a Distinguished Professor Emeritus at the Graduate School of Management, University of California, Davis.

== Research ==
Griffin's publications in scientific journals have primarily focused on topics in accounting, capital market theory, financial reporting, and corporate disclosure.

=== Quarterly earnings and market predictions ===
In his early research, Griffin studied the stochastic properties of quarterly earnings, comparing security analysts' and time-series models. He demonstrated that security analysts excel in forecasting due to their information use and timing advantage. His 1977 investigation of the time-series behavior of quarterly earnings also revealed non-Martingale patterns and interdependencies. In 1987, he studied the association between abnormal stock returns and multiple proxies for the market's assessment of unexpected quarterly earnings. This research revealed a potential measurement error interpretation in multiple regression tests of abnormal stock returns on unexpected earnings proxies and other variables, with varying effectiveness for different firm sizes and forecast periods.

=== Accounting, auditing, and financial markets ===
Griffin's research has also explored various aspects of the implications of corporate reporting for auditing and investor decision-making, with an emphasis on how corporate reporting enhances services and outcomes for managers and stakeholders. He examined the impact of financial metrics and analysts' forecasts on security returns, uncovering their role in investment decisions and elucidated the relationships among audit fees, corporate governance, and audit quality under the Sarbanes-Oxley (SOX) legislation. Together with William H. Beaver and others, he evaluated security price behavior in response to ASR 190, which required additional current cost information, revealing no significant benefits. He also assessed audit fees post-SOX, identifying significant relations among audit risk, effort, and auditor changes, leading to increased risk and higher auditing costs for complex accounting systems.

=== Market behavior, investor decision-making, and sustainability disclosures ===
Griffin has also investigated the role of short interest in credit markets, how sustainability disclosures impact stock prices, and whether investors' recognize potentially stranded assets on energy company balance sheets. In particular, he assessed how the stock market responds to bond ratings, revealing that downgrades convey information to investors, whereas upgrades show varied returns. Additionally, he analyzed investors' responses to 10-K and 10-Q filings, highlighting strong reactions to 10-Ks and 10-Qs beyond the initial earnings announcement. In later work, he identified that investors negatively price firms' greenhouse gas emissions, implying a significant equity discount for firms that disclosed emissions to the Carbon Disclosure Project. By contrast, his research on voluntary CSR disclosure identified significant positive price effects for shareholders, particularly for smaller firms. His analysis of the stock market's reaction to a 2009 Nature journal article on limited fossil fuel reserves showed only a moderate price drop for major U.S. oil and gas companies, with limited impact of the subsequent press coverage. In an article on the content of lease disclosures, he took task with the Securities and Exchange Commission for favoring large institutional investors over others by promoting complex disclosures that few can understand.

=== Extreme weather and climate change ===
Griffin's 2023 work examined how climate-change-related extreme weather events affected business performance, firm value, what companies told their shareholders, and the fees companies paid to their auditors. He established that companies disclose little about the impact of wildfires despite this being a growing environmental threat and a material concern for many companies. Furthermore, he found that auditors charge higher fees when extreme weather impacts their clients, and that stock markets are increasingly recognizing heat spells as a material risk factor, which is a threat to their market value. He has also studied whether investors distinguish between shareholder proposals on climate change that increase versus decrease firm value, finding investors are willing to accept lower returns for proposals designed to reduce carbon emissions or meet other sustainability objectives. Taken together, this work has implications for disclosure regulators in deciding what should be reported to stakeholders on how firms contribute to climate change and how climate change affects firms. Speaking to a broader audience, he has also published his work on climate change in Nature Energy.

== Awards and honors ==
- 1973 – Doctoral Consortium Fellow, American Accounting Association
- 1973 – Fellow, Deloitte Haskins & Sells
- 2012 – Fellow, New Zealand Institute of Chartered Accountants
- 2021 – Appointment as Honorary Professor, University of Otago
- 2025 - 2025-2026 Edward A. Dickson Emeriti Professor

== Bibliography ==
=== Selected books ===
- Usefulness to Investors and Creditors of Information Provided by Financial Reporting (1982) ISBN 978-0910065245
- Cases in Corporate Financial Reporting (1984) ISBN 978-0131167162
- Accounting for the Translation of Foreign Currencies: The Effects of Statement 52 on Equity Analysts (1987) ISBN 978-0910065221
- Cases in Corporate Financial Reporting: Second Edition (1991) ISBN 978-0256124057

=== Selected articles ===
- Griffin, Paul A. (1977). "The Time-Series Behavior of Quarterly Earnings: Preliminary Evidence". Journal of Accounting Research. 15 (1): 71–83. doi:10.2307/2490556. JSTOR 2490556.
- Griffin, Paul A.; Sanvicente, Antonio Z. (March 1982). "Common Stock Returns and Rating Changes: A Methodological Comparison". The Journal of Finance. 37 (1): 103–119. doi:10.1111/j.1540-6261.1982.tb01098.x.
- Brown, Lawrence D.; Hagerman, Robert L.; Griffin, Paul A.; Zmijewski, Mark E. (April 1987). "Security analyst superiority relative to univariate time-series models in forecasting quarterly earnings". Journal of Accounting and Economics. 9 (1): 61–87. doi:10.1016/0165-4101(87)90017-6.
- Brown, Lawrence D.; Hagerman, Robert L.; Griffin, Paul A.; Zmijewski, Mark E. (July 1987). "An evaluation of alternative proxies for the market's assessment of unexpected earnings". Journal of Accounting and Economics. 9 (2): 159–193. doi:10.1016/0165-4101(87)90004-8.
- Griffin, Paul A. (December 2003). "Got Information? Investor Response to Form 10-K and Form 10-Q EDGAR Filings". Review of Accounting Studies. 8 (4): 433–460. doi:10.1023/A:1027351630866.
- Griffin, Paul A.; Lont, David H.; Sun, Estelle Y. (June 2017). "The Relevance to Investors of Greenhouse Gas Emission Disclosures". Contemporary Accounting Research. 34 (2): 1265–1297. doi:10.1111/1911-3846.12298.
- Griffin, Paul A.; Jiang, Yijing; Sun, Estelle Y. (May 2023). "Threatened by wildfires: What do firms disclose in their 10-Ks?". Journal of Business Finance & Accounting. 50 (5–6): 895–942. doi:10.1111/jbfa.12674.
- Diaz-Rainey, Ivan; Griffin, Paul A.; Lont, David H.; Mateo-Márquez, Antonio J.; Zamora-Ramírez, Constancio (2024). "Shareholder Activism on Climate Change: Evolution, Determinants, and Consequences". Journal of Business Ethics. 193 (3): 481–510. doi:10.1007/s10551-023-05486-x. hdl:10072/425821. ISSN 0167-4544.
- Göttsche, Max; Griffin, Paul A.; Habermann, Florian; Schiemann, Frank; Spandel, Theresa (2025-12-01). "A double-edged sword: materiality classifications of sustainability topics". Review of Accounting Studies. 30 (4): 3596–3639. doi:10.1007/s11142-025-09908-1. ISSN 1573-7136. PMC 12637372. PMID 41281706.
- Griffin, Paul A.; Lont, David H.; Lubberink, Martien J. P. (2025-03-01). "The effects of extreme high temperature spells on financial performance". The British Accounting Review. 57 (2) 101383. doi:10.1016/j.bar.2024.101383. ISSN 0890-8389.
