= Deborah H. Griffin =

American statistician

Deborah H. Griffin is a retired American statistician who worked for many years at the United States Census Bureau.

== Education and career ==
Griffin was a mathematics major as an undergraduate at the University of Connecticut. She has also studied statistics and survey methodology at a graduate level.

She started working for the United States Census Bureau in 1977, in the bureau's Statistical Methods Division. She was a branch chief in the Decennial Planning Division in the 1980s and, following the 1990 census, headed the Census Evaluation Branch of the Decennial Statistical Studies Division. Later, she worked for the American Community Survey, became a special assistant to the chief of the American Community Survey Office, and joined the Federal Committee on Statistical Methodology. In 2013 she became head of the Undercount of Young Children Task Force.

In 2019, the Los Angeles Times listed her as retired, while quoting her about likely undercounts in the census because of immigrant concerns about the safety of participating during the first presidency of Donald Trump. She continued leading the Undercount of Young Children Research Team in her retirement.

== Recognition ==
Griffin is a three-time recipient of the Bronze Medal Award of the US Census Bureau, and was the 2010 recipient of the Jeanne E. Griffith Mentoring Award of the American Statistical Association Government Statistics Section. She was named as a Fellow of the American Statistical Association in the 2012 class of fellows.

Her work at the census bureau on undercounting young children in complex households was given an honorable mention at the 2019 Praxis Awards of the Washington Association of Professional Anthropologists.
