= Robert Griffin =

Robert Griffin may refer to:

- Robert Griffin (actor) (1902–1960), American film and television actor
- Robert Griffin (baseball) (fl. 1931), American baseball player
- Robert Griffin (offensive lineman) (born 1989), American football offensive lineman
- Robert Griffin III (born 1990), American football quarterback
- Robert F. Griffin (1925–1999), American Roman Catholic priest
- Robert G. Griffin (born 1942), professor of chemistry
- Robert P. Griffin (1923–2015), United States senator

== See also ==
- Rob Griffin (disambiguation)
- Bob Griffin (disambiguation)
