= Arthur Griffiths (footballer, born 1879) =

English footballer (1879–?)

Personal information
- Full name: Arthur Griffiths
- Date of birth: 16 March 1879
- Place of birth: Birmingham, England
- Date of death: 1955
- Position: Full-back

Youth career
- Lozells

Senior career*
Years	Team	Apps	(Gls)
1897–1898	Bristol Eastville Rovers		
1898–1904	Bristol Rovers	105	(1)
1904–1911	Notts County	163	(1)
- * Club domestic league appearances and goals

Arthur Griffiths (born 16 March 1879) was a professional footballer who played for Bristol Rovers and Notts County.

Playing as a full-back, Griffiths joined Bristol Rovers (then known as Bristol Eastville Rovers) in 1897 from Lozells. During his first two seasons Rovers played in both the Birmingham & District League and the professional section of the Western League, before becoming founder members of the Southern League in 1899. He went on to play 105 games for Rovers in the Southern League, scoring once, before joining Football League First Division side Notts County in January 1904.

== Sources ==
- Byrne, Stephen; Jay, Mike (2003). Bristol Rovers Football Club - The Definitive History 1883-2003. Stroud: Tempus. ISBN 0-7524-2717-2.
