= Harriet Griffin =

American mathematician (1903–1991)

Harriet Madeline Griffin (April 6, 1903 – January 13, 1991) was an American mathematician, and the author of a textbook on number theory. She taught for many years at Brooklyn College.

== Education and career ==
Griffin was born on April 6, 1903, in Brooklyn, one of two daughters of a furniture salesman. She was educated at Baldwin High School in Baldwin, New York, graduating as valedictorian in 1920. She earned a bachelor's degree at Hunter College in 1925, graduating Phi Beta Kappa, winning the Thomas Hunter Prize in mathematics, and becoming a founding member of Pi Mu Epsilon; her sister graduated in the same year and become a mathematics teacher.

Griffin continued at Hunter College as a tutor and instructor from 1926 to 1930, meanwhile earning a master's degree at Columbia University in 1929. Her master's thesis was Modern Geometry in Three Dimensions. When Hunter College merged with the Brooklyn campus of the City College of New York to form Brooklyn College in 1930, she became a faculty member at the newly formed college.

While continuing to work as a faculty member at Brooklyn College, she completed a Ph.D. at New York University in 1939; her dissertation, The Abelian Quasi-Group, was supervised by Donald Flanders. With the completion of her doctorate, she rose through the faculty ranks at Brooklyn College to become an assistant professor in 1940, associate professor in 1950, and full professor in 1956.

She retired as a professor emerita in 1966, continuing to teach for two years at Molloy College. She died on January 13, 1991, in Lakewood, New Jersey.

== Book ==
Griffin was the author of Elementary Theory of Numbers (McGraw-Hill, 1954). She also published two textbooks through the Brooklyn College Press, The Concepts of the Theory of Numbers (1947) and Systems of Abstract Algebra (1962).

== Recognition ==
Griffin was named a Fellow of the American Association for the Advancement of Science in 1960.
