= Peter Griffin (disambiguation) =

Peter Griffin is the main protagonist in the American animated television series Family Guy.

Peter Griffin may also refer to:

- Peter A. Griffin (1937–1998), blackjack scholar and mathematician

== See also ==
- "Peter Griffin: Husband, Father... Brother?", the 14th episode of the third season of Family Guy
