= Ben Griffin =

Ben or Benjamin Griffin may refer to:

- Ben Griffin (British Army soldier) (born 1977), former British SAS soldier and anti-war activist
- Ben Griffin (soccer) (born 1986), Australian football (soccer) player
- Ben Griffin (golfer) (born 1996), American professional golfer
- Ben Hill Griffin Jr. (1910–1990), Florida politician
- Benjamin Griffin (actor) (1680–1740), dramatist and actor
- Benjamin Griffin (alpine skier) (born 1986), New Zealand skier
- Benjamin S. Griffin (born 1946), U.S. Army general
