= 1943 Cork Intermediate Hurling Championship =

Irish hurling competition

- Champions: Shanballymore (1st title); R. McDonnell (captain)
- Runners-up: Douglas

The 1943 Cork Intermediate Hurling Championship was the 34th staging of the Cork Intermediate Hurling Championship since its establishment by the Cork County Board in 1909.

The final was played on 29 August 1943 at the Mardyke in Cork, between Shanballymore and Douglas, in what was their first ever meeting in the final. Shanballymore won the match by 7–09 to 3–02 to claim their first ever championship title.

== Results ==
=== Final ===
29 August 1943 Final	Shanballymore	7-09 – 3-02	Douglas	The Mardyke
