= John Griffin =

John Griffin may refer to:

== Lawyers ==
- John Griffin (judge) (1774/1779 – after 1823), American jurist and member of the Michigan Territorial Supreme Court, 1806–1823
- John Bowes Griffin (1903–1992), British lawyer, Chief Justice of Uganda and first Speaker of the Ugandan Parliament

== Politicians ==
- John Griffin (Allegany County, New York) (c. 1771–1846), New York politician
- John Griffin (MP) (fl. 1414), English politician
- John Gardner Griffin (1815–?), Wisconsin and Connecticut politician
- John K. Griffin (1789–1841), U.S. Congressman from South Carolina, 1831–1841
- John Strother Griffin (1816–1898), American surgeon and politician in Los Angeles
- John W. Griffin (politician) (1927–2006), American local political figure in Ohio

== Sports ==
- John Griffin (alpine skier) (1930–2005), Canadian alpine skier
- John Griffin (baseball) (1913–1984), American baseball player
- John Griffin (basketball) (born 1956), American college basketball player and coach
- John Griffin (defensive back) (born 1939), American football defensive back
- John Griffin (hurler) (born 1984), Irish hurler with the Kerry hurling team
- John Griffin (rugby league) (fl. 1970s–1980s), New Zealand rugby player
- John Griffin (rugby union) (1859–1895), English doctor who played international rugby for Wales
- John Griffin (running back) (born 1988), American football player
- John-Ford Griffin (born 1979), American Major League Baseball outfielder
- John Griffin III, American college basketball coach
- Corn Griffin (John Charles Griffin, 1911–1973), American boxer

== Others ==
- John Griffin, 4th Baron Howard de Walden (1719–1797), English nobleman and army officer
- John Howard Griffin (1920–1980), American journalist and novelist
- John Joseph Griffin (1802–1877), English chemist and publisher
- John Smith Griffin (1807–1899), American missionary in Oregon Country
- John W. Griffin (archaeologist) (1919–1993), American historian in Florida
- Johnny Griffin (1928–2008), American bop and hard bop tenor saxophonist
- John Griffin (businessman) (born 1942), British businessman and philanthropist
- John H. Griffin (1914–1988), Deputy Supreme Knight of the Knights of Columbus
- John J. Griffin (2010–2026), perpetrator of the 2026 Silver Rail Elementary School shooting

== See also ==
- John Colahan Griffin Nature Reserve, Victoria, Australia
- John Griffin Carlisle (1834–1910), American congressman from Kentucky
- Jonathon Griffin (born 1986), Australian aboriginal footballer
- Griffin (The Invisible Man), Jack Griffin, fictional character
