= Martin Griffin =

Martin Griffin may refer to:

- Martin Griffin (Gaelic footballer) (1953/4–2021), Irish Gaelic footballer for Donegal
- L. Martin Griffin (1920–2024), American environmentalist and conservationist
- Martin Ignatius Joseph Griffin (1842–1911), American Catholic journalist and historian
- Martin Griffin (Massachusetts politician), state senator in the 1867 Massachusetts legislature
- Martin Griffin (Michigan politician), state representative for Michigan's 64th House of Representatives district 2007–2010

== See also ==
- Marty Griffin (disambiguation)
