= Richard Griffin =

Richard Griffin may refer to:

- Richard Griffin (sailor) (born 1935), sailor from the United States Virgin Islands
- Richard Griffin and Company, publishers to the University of Glasgow in the 19th century
- Richard Allen Griffin (born 1952), judge for the United States Court of Appeals for the Sixth Circuit
- Richard J. Griffin, head of the Bureau of Diplomatic Security 2005–2007, acting inspector general of Department of Veterans Affairs 2013–2015
- Richard Griffin, 2nd Baron Braybrooke (1750–1825), British politician and peer
- Richard Griffin, 3rd Baron Braybrooke (1783–1858), British Whig politician and literary figure
- Ric Griffin, fictional character in Holby City
- Rick Griffin (1944–1991), American artist
- Professor Griff (born 1960), American rapper
- Dick Griffin (born 1939), American trombonist
- Richard Griffin, chairman of the Poor Law Medical Reform Association
