= Matthew Griffin =

Matthew or Matt Griffin may refer to:

- Matt Griffin (American football) (born 1968), American football coach
- Matthew Griffin (game designer) (born 1979), American game designer
- Matt Griffin (racing driver) (born 1982), Irish racing driver
- Matthew Griffin (golfer) (born 1983), Australian professional golfer
- Matthew Griffin (writer), American writer
