= Ron Griffin (artist) =

American artist (born 1954)

Ron Griffin (born June 27, 1954 in Pomona, California) is an American artist based in Venice, Los Angeles. 20 of his Works are by Museo Cantonale d'Arte of Lugano.
