= Bob Griffin =

Bob Griffin may refer to:

- Bob F. Griffin (1935–2021), Speaker of the Missouri House of Representatives
- Bob Griffin (American football coach) (born 1940), head coach of the Idaho State and Rhode Island Rams football teams
- Bob Griffin (basketball) (born 1950), American-Israeli basketball player, and English literature professor
- Bob Griffin (linebacker) (1929–2012), American football linebacker
- Bob Griffin (NASCAR) (1895–1979), NASCAR team owner
- Bob Griffin (born 1959), bassist with the BoDeans

== See also ==
- Robert Griffin (disambiguation)
