= Patrick Griffin (academic) =

Australian academic

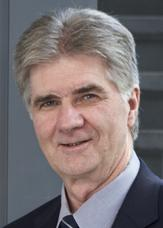
Professor Patrick Griffin

Patrick Edward Griffin (died 2025) was an Australian academic who held the Chair of Education (Assessment) at the University of Melbourne and was, for more than 25 years, the founding Director of the Assessment Research Centre. He was Deputy Dean of the Melbourne Graduate School of Education.

Professor Griffin was awarded the John Smythe medal for excellence in research for his work on profiling literacy development and his work on profile reporting was identified in the annual 1996 yearbook of the American Society for Curriculum Development in Washington as world's best practice. He was a project team leader for UNESCO in southern Africa, and was awarded, in 2005, a UNESCO Research Medal by the Ministers of Education from southern African nations. Professor Griffin was a World Bank consultant in Vietnam and China, leading national and international teams in studies of literacy and numeracy assessment and has developed a system of teacher assessment recently signed into law by the Vietnam Government to be applied to more than 380000 teachers and to be replicated in China. His work focused on item response modelling applications in interpretive frameworks for criterion referenced performance and developmental competence assessment. He also addressed major professional associations, and taught and conducted assessment and evaluation research projects in Australia, Hong Kong, France, Ireland, the United States, Vietnam, China, New Zealand, Canada and Britain. Professor Griffin was one of only six Australians admitted to the International Academy of Education. His work included the application of item response modelling to performance assessment and the development of professional standards for classroom teachers and educational managers in Australia, Vietnam and China.
