= Francis Griffin =

Francis Griffin may refer to:

- Francis Griffin (Family Guy)
- Francis Griffin (priest) (1893–1983), Irish Spiritan priest
- Francis E. Griffin (1910–1973), American architect
- L. Francis Griffin (1917–1980), American civil rights advocate
- Francis Vielé-Griffin (1864–1937), French poet
