= Ted Griffin (footballer) =

Australian rules footballer, born 1913

Personal information
- Born: 18 March 1913
- Died: 16 February 1998 (aged 84)

Playing career^{1}
Years	Club	Games (Goals)
1935	Fitzroy	1 (1)
- ^{1} Playing statistics correct to the end of 1935.

Ted Griffin (18 March 1913 – 16 February 1998) was an Australian rules footballer who played with Fitzroy in the Victorian Football League (VFL).
