= Griffith (surname) =

Origin
- Origin: Welsh
- Meaning: "strong lord"
- Region of origin: Wales

Other names
- Variant forms: Gruffydd, Griffiths

Griffith is a surname of Welsh origin which derives from the given name Gruffudd. The prefix Griff (originally Gruff) may mean "strong grip" and the suffix, udd, means "chief"/"lord". The earliest recorded example of the surname was "Gryffyth" in 1295, but the given name is older. People with the surname or its variants include:

== List of people surnamed Griffith ==
=== A–H ===
- Alan Arnold Griffith, British engineer specializing in fracture mechanics and aircraft gas turbine engines
- Alfred John Griffith (1846–1920), Congregationalist minister in Australia
- Anastasia Griffith, British actress
- Andrew Griffith, (born 1971) British Conservative politician
- Andy Griffith (1926–2012), American actor, writer and producer
- Anthony Griffith (footballer), English-born Montserrat international football player
- Arthur Griffith, Irish Republican leader
- Arthur Troyte Griffith, British architect
- Bill Griffith, (born 1944), American cartoonist
- Charles Griffith (disambiguation), various people
- Clark Griffith, baseball player, manager, executive, and member of the Hall of Fame
- Claudia Griffith (1950–2018), American politician
- Corinne Griffith, silent film era actress and author
- David Griffith (Clwydfardd) (1800–1894), Welsh poet
- David Griffith (priest) (1936–2024), Welsh Anglican priest
- D. W. Griffith, American film director
- Dan Griffith (born 1987), American DJ known as Gryffin
- Edward Griffith (zoologist), British naturalist
- Edward H. Griffith (1894–1975), American film director
- Elisabeth Griffith, American historian, educator, and activist
- Ellis Ellis-Griffith (1860–1926), British barrister and politician
- Ellis Griffith (priest) (died 1938), Welsh clergyman
- Emile Griffith (1938–2013), U.S. Virgin Islands boxer
- Eva Kinney Griffith (1852–1918), American journalist, temperance activist
- Forrest Griffith (1928–2007), American football player
- Francis Griffith (disambiguation)
- Frank Kingsley Griffith, British Liberal politician and judge
- Frederick Griffith (disambiguation), multiple people
- George Griffith, writer
- Grace Griffith, American folk singer
- Griffith J. Griffith, Welsh-American industrialist known for donating land for Griffith Park in Los Angeles
- Harold Griffith (1894–1985), Canadian anaesthetist
- Homer Griffith (1912–1990), American football player
- Hugh Griffith, Welsh actor

=== J–Z ===
- James Bray Griffith (1871–1937), American business theorist
- Jamie Bamber, born Jamie St. John Bamber Griffith, British actor
- Jason Griffith, American voice actor for Sonic the Hedgehog
- John Griffith (disambiguation), multiple people
- Jonas Griffith (born 1997), American football player
- Justin Griffith, NFL fullback with Oakland Raiders
- Keith Griffith (1947–2025), Barbadian footballer and technical director
- Kenneth Griffith, Welsh actor and documentary film maker
- Laetitia Griffith (born 1965), Dutch politician
- Lillian Griffith (1877–1972) Welsh artist and sculptor
- Manley Griffith, American actor better known as Griff Barnett
- Mari Griffith, Welsh radio announcer and writer
- Mark Griffith, British classical scholar
- Megan Griffith (born 1985), American basketball coach
- Melanie Griffith (born 1957), American actress
- Michael Griffith (disambiguation)
- Morgan Griffith, American politician from Virginia
- Nanci Griffith (1953–2021), American singer, guitarist and songwriter
- Nicola Griffith, British author
- Nathaniel Griffith Lerotholi, the fifth Paramount Chief of Lesotho
- Phillip Griffith, mathematician
- Ralph T. H. Griffith, Indologist
- Ronald H. Griffith, Vice Chief of Staff of the United States Army
- Samuel Griffith (1845–1920), Australian judge and politician
- Samuel B. Griffith, officer and commander in the United States Marine Corps
- Thomas B. Griffith, American federal judge
- Thomas Ian Griffith (born 1962), American actor, screenwriter, musician, and martial artist
- Thor Griffith, American football player
- Virgil Griffith, American hacker
- Welborn Griffith, American soldier
- William Griffith (botanist) (1810–1845), British doctor and naturalist
- Willis Griffith, American politician
- Xiomara Griffith, Venezuelan judoka
- Yolanda Griffith (born 1970), American basketball player

== Fictional characters with the name Griffith ==
- Reanne Griffith, a.k.a. Hazuki Fujiwara, from the anime series Ojamajo Doremi
  - George Griffith, a.k.a. Akira Fujiwara, her father
- Griffith (Berserk), the main antagonist from the anime and manga series Berserk

== See also ==
- Griffith (name)
- Griffiths
- Griffin (surname)
- Gruffudd
