= C. W. P. Douglas de Fenzi =

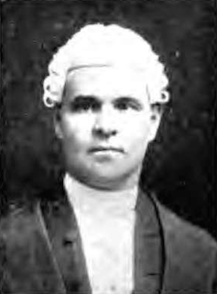
- Born: 18 June 1863; Fort White, Cape Colony
- Died: 18 June 1927 (aged 64); Pietermaritzburg, Natal, South Africa
- Occupation: Clerk to the Legislative Council of Natal

C. W. P. Douglas de Fenzi (18 June 1863 – 18 June 1927) was Clerk to the Legislative Council of Natal. He also served as Secretary on a number of Government Commissions in Natal, including Secretary of the Natal Reception Committee on the visit of the Duke and Duchess of Cornwall in 1901, was instrumental in the development of South African Rugby Union, and played a prominent role in freemasonry in Natal serving as Grand Deacon and District Grand Secretary.

== Early life ==
Charles William Perks Douglas de Fenzi was born in South Africa on 18 June 1863, the son of John Douglas de Fenzi and Sarah (née Perks), and baptised on 29 August 1863 at the Military Chapel, Keiskama Hoek. He was educated in England at Bedford Modern School between 1872 and 1881 where he was a member of the Rugby First XV in 1880 and the Cricket First XI in 1881. Douglas de Fenzi also served as Secretary of the Reading and Debating Society and took a prominent part in School Theatricals.

== Career ==
Douglas de Fenzi came to South Africa in 1881 intending to pursue a career in Government Service but, on arrival, decided to pursue a career in journalism. His journalistic endeavours proved to be short lived and he was later appointed Clerk Assistant and Librarian of the Natal Legislative Council under the Crown Colony Government.

On the establishment of the Responsible Government in 1893, he was appointed Clerk to the reformed Legislative Council. He served as Secretary to the Commission of the Glencoe Railway Accident in 1896, and variously acted as Chief Clerk at the Attorney General’s Department and Under Treasurer. In addition to these roles, he served as Secretary of a number of Government Commissions including the Botanic Gardens Commission, the Transvaal Trade Commission, the Gaol Commission and the Municipal Corporations Commission, among other positions.

In 1901, on the occasion of the visit of the Duke and Duchess of Cornwall, Douglas de Fenzi served as Secretary of the Natal Reception Committee, receiving the thanks of Their Royal Highnesses, the Governor and the Government. In 1905 he served as Organising Secretary for Natal on the visit of the British Association, receiving the thanks of the Governor, Government and the British Association itself.

== Voluntary commissions ==
Douglas de Fenzi held a commission in the Cape Town Highlanders. During the Second Boer War (1899-1902), he served as Secretary to the Pietermaritzburg Association for Aid to the Sick and Wounded, Secretary to the Parliament House (Volunteer) Hospital in Pietermaritzburg and was among the first to Ladysmith with hospital comforts after the Relief of Ladysmith.

== Sporting interests ==
Douglas de Fenzi took an active part in the development of South African Rugby, both in Natal and nationally, as a player, referee and administrator.

He began as a player for Hamiltons, a club of which he was Captain in 1883 when the Club won the Grand Challenge. In 1893 he represented Natal Rugby Union (NRU) as a delegate to a meeting of the South African Rugby Board and became Vice-President of the NRU in 1894. Douglas de Fenzi spent some time in Cape Town and was Captain of the Cape Town team in 1884 and 1885. In 1886 he was Joint Secretary of the Cape Town Gymnastic Society and a Committee Member of the Cape Town Swimming Club.

After Cape Town, Douglas de Fenzi returned to Natal and in 1889 had a significant role in the establishment of the South African Rugby Board. As a player he made appearances for Natal and made his debut as an international referee in a game between the Combined Pietermaritzburg XV (an all-Natal side) and the British Touring Team in 1891.

== Freemasonry ==
Douglas de Fenzi was an enthusiastic Freemason. On the occasion of the Coronation of the King in 1902, Douglas de Fenzi received the Natal Masonic Honour as Past Grand Deacon of the United Grand Lodge of England. He also served as District Grand Secretary for Natal.

== Personal life ==
For many years, Douglas de Fenzi was a member of the Diocesan Synod, Anglican Communion, in Natal. He was also a representative of the Natal Diocese in the Provincial Synod for South Africa.

In 1889, Douglas de Fenzi married the daughter of J. C. Berrange, a Solicitor of Cape Town. They had three children together. Charles William Perks Douglas De Fenzi died in 1927 on the day of his 64th birthday, 18 June 1927, and was buried at the Commercial Road Cemetery, Pietermaritzburg, Kwazulu-Natal.
