= Michael Griffiths =

Michael Griffiths or Mike Griffiths may refer to:

- Michael Griffiths (cabaret artist), Australian cabaret performer, winner of 2016 Helpmann Award for Best Cabaret Performer
- Michael Griffiths (TV personality), British contestant on Love Island, s.5 in 2019
- Michael Ambrose Griffiths (1928-2011), English Roman Catholic bishop
- Mike Griffiths, Welsh rugby union player
- Mike Griffiths (British Army officer) a retired British police officer

== See also ==
- Michael Griffith (disambiguation)
- Michael Griffin (disambiguation)
