= Ellis Griffith =

Ellis Griffith may refer to:

- Ellis Ellis-Griffith (1860–1926), British barrister and politician
- Ellis Griffith (priest) (died 1938), Welsh clergyman
