= Gruff =

Gruff may refer to:

- Gruff, harsh and surly in nature and/or tone of voice
- Gruffs, servants of the Summer Faerie Court in Jim Butcher's The Dresden Files series
- The Three Billy Goats Gruff, Norwegian folk-tale The Three Billy Goats Gruff
- Gruff, a character in Legend of the NeverBeast from Disney
- Gruff, a diminutive of Welsh name Gruffudd
