= Fort Hare =

British-built fort in the Eastern Cape, South Africa

Coordinates: 32°47′13″S 26°50′55″E

Fort Hare is an 1835 British-built fort on a rocky outcrop at the foothills of the Amatola Mountains, near the present-day town of Alice, Eastern Cape in South Africa.

== History ==
Fort Hare was originally constructed by the British during the wars between the British troops and the Xhosa of the 19th century.

In 1837, the British also built Fort Glamorgan on the West Bank of East London, which was annexed to the Cape Colony that same year. It is part of a series of forts established by the British, including Fort Murray, Fort White, Fort Cox, Fort Hare, and Fort Willshire, in the region known as British Kaffraria.

On 29 December 1850, during the Eighth Frontier War with the Xhosas, approximately 220 British troops were forced to retreat to Fort Hare following an unsuccessful attempt to relieve Sir Harry Smith, who was besieged at Fort Cox.

== Present Day ==
Some of the ruins of fort Hare are still visible, including the graves of some of the British soldiers who died in service there. Missionary activity (James Stewart) led to the establishment of a school for missionaries, in the early 20th century. This school gave rise to the University of Fort Hare. The university, guided by the Christian principles, offered low and heavily subsidised fees.

== See also ==
- List of Castles and Fortifications in South Africa
