= John Griffith =

John Griffith may refer to:

== Clergymen and monks ==
- John Griffith (Baptist minister) (1622?–1700), English General Baptist minister
- John Griffith (monk) (fl. 1553), Welsh præmonstratensian and Cistercian monk
- John Griffith (priest) (1818/19–1885), Anglican priest in south Wales
- John Jones (martyr) (died 1598), also known as John Griffith

== Musicians ==
- John Thomas Griffith (born 1960), American singer-songwriter with the band Cowboy Mouth
- Johnny Griffith (musician) (1936–2002), African-American musician

== Pilots ==
- John H. Griffith (1905–2011), test pilot
- John Sharpe Griffith (1898–1974), American First World War flying ace

== Politicians ==
- John Griffith (died 1580), MP for Flintshire
- John Griffith (of Plas Mawr) (died 1609), MP for Carnarvon 1571, 1572 and 1604
- John Griffith (of Llŷn), MP for Carnarvonshire 1640
- John Griffith (MP for Beaumaris) (1591–1642), Welsh politician
- John Griffith (MP for Caernarvon) (1662–1687), MP for Carnarvon 1685
- John Griffith (MP for Chester), represented Chester
- John Griffith (1687–1739), Welsh MP for Caernarvonshire
- John Wynne Griffith (1763–1834), MP for Denbigh
- John Griffith (governor of Bombay), governor of Bombay, 1795
- John K. Griffith (1882–1942), U.S. representative from Louisiana

== Sportsmen ==
- John G. Griffith (1880–1948), American football, basketball, and baseball coach at University of Idaho, University of Iowa, Oklahoma A&M University, New Mexico A&M
- John L. Griffith (1877–1944), American football, basketball, baseball, and track athlete, coach, and college athletics administrator, first commissioner of the Big Ten Conference
- Johnny Griffith (coach) (1924–2003), American football coach at South Georgia College and the University of Georgia

== Other people ==
- John Griffith (engineer) (1848–1938), Irish civil engineer
- John Stanley Griffith (1928–1972), British chemist and biophysicist
- John Griffith (journalist) (1821–1877), Welsh language journalist
- J. A. G. Griffith (John Aneurin Grey Griffith, 1918–2010), Welsh legal scholar
- John V. Griffith (born 1947), former president of Presbyterian College and Lyon College
- John William Griffith (1789–1855), English architect and surveyor

== Other uses ==
- USS John Griffith

== See also ==
- Griffith John (1831–1912), Welsh Christian missionary to China
- John Griffiths (disambiguation)
