= Peter Pike =

Peter Pike may refer to:

- Peter Pike (British politician) (1937–2021), British politician, MP (1983–2005)
- Peter Pike (Australian politician) (1879–1949), Australian politician, member of the Tasmanian House of Assembly
- Peter Pike (priest) (born 1953), Welsh Anglican priest
