= Fort Cox, Eastern Cape =

Coordinates: 32°43′48″S 27°1′32″E

Fort Cox
- South Africa

Site information
- Type: Block house
- Controlled by: South Africa
- Open to the public: Yes
- Condition: Ruins

Site history
- Built: 1835
- Battles/wars: Cape Frontier Wars

Garrison information
- Garrison: 6 Royal Artillery, British infantry, 160 Hottentots

Fort Cox near Middledrift in the Eastern Cape, South Africa was a frontier fort in the Amatola Mountains on a loop of the Keiskamma River.

== History ==
Dating back to 1835, it was named after Major William Cox of the 75th Regiment and accommodated a garrison of six Royal Artillery, one company of British Infantry and 160 Hottentots. Like many fortifications of its time, it was simply an earth redoubt reinforced with stone and consisting of a quadrangle of strong stone cottages and walls. Surrounded by high hills, Mount MacDonald and Seven Kloof Mountain towering beyond, it was well situated as a base for patrols of the valleys and ravines of the Amatola and Keiskamma Mountains during the frequent wars and unrest of the period. The ruins of the fort are still to be seen. Fort White, situated on the Debe Flats, was its nearest neighbour on the way to King William’s Town. The site was abandoned in 1836 when the British left the region, and was rebuilt in 1846 to deal with the Seventh Xhosa War.

On 29 December 1850, during the Eighth Frontier War with the Xhosas, some 220 British troops were forced to retreat to Fort Hare after an unsuccessful attempt to relieve Sir Harry Smith, besieged at Fort Cox.

The site currently houses the Fort Cox College of Agriculture & Forestry.

== See also ==
- List of Castles and Fortifications in South Africa
