= Archdeaconry of Montgomery =

Archdeaconry of Montgomery is an archdeaconry within the Diocese of St Asaph. It covers the eastern area of Montgomeryshire and includes Welshpool, Newtown, and Llanfyllin. Originally part of the Archdeaconry of Powys, which dated from the Medieval period. The Archdeaconry of Powys was reconstituted by an Order in Council in 1844, when it was split into the Archdeaconry of Montgomery and the Archdeaconry of St Asaph. In recent years the Archdeacon has lived in 17th century half-timbered Vicarage at Berriew.

== Archdeacons ==
Former Archdeacons include:

- 1848–1861: William Clive, Vicar of Welshpool 1819–1865. He was the son of William Clive MP, who was the brother of Sir Robert Clive.
- 1861–1886: Henry Powell Ffoulkes, Rector of Whittington, Oswestry, 1879–1886.
- 1886-1916: (d.) David Thomas (Archdeacon of Montgomery). Rector of Llandrinio. A notable Church historian.
- 1916–1925: (res.): Grimaldi Davis
- 1925–1938: (d.): Ellis Griffith
- 1938–1944: (ret.): Evan Thomas
- 1944–1951: (d.): John Lloyd
- 1952–1959: William A Jones
- 1959-1966: William Williams
- 1966–1976: Elidyr Glynne Jones
- 1977–1987: Owen Thomas
- 1987-1998: Bill Pritchard.
- 1998–2002: David Griffith
- 2002–2012: John Thelwell
- 2012–2018: Peter Pike
- 7 October 2018 – 31 August 2024 (ret.): Barry Wilson
- 1 September 2024 – present: Gerwyn Capon

Barry Frank Wilson (born 1958) was collated Archdeacon of Montogomery on 7 October 2018. A former teacher, he trained for the ministry on the Church of England's Northern Ordination Course; he was then made deacon at Petertide 1997 (29 June) — by Keith Sutton, Bishop of Lichfield, at Lichfield Cathedral — and ordained priest the following Petertide (27 June 1998) — by Christopher Hill, Bishop of Stafford, at his title church. Wilson served his title (curacy) at Stone until 1999, later becoming an incumbent in the same diocese — Vicar of Betley, 2004–2013. He then moved to Chester diocese, where he served as Rector of Nantwich until 2017, then a canon residentiary of the cathedral until his archidiaconal collation. In 2024, it was announced that Wilson intends to retire effective 31 August.
