= Xhosa Wars =

Series of wars in southern Africa, 1779–1879

- Part of the colonisation of Africa
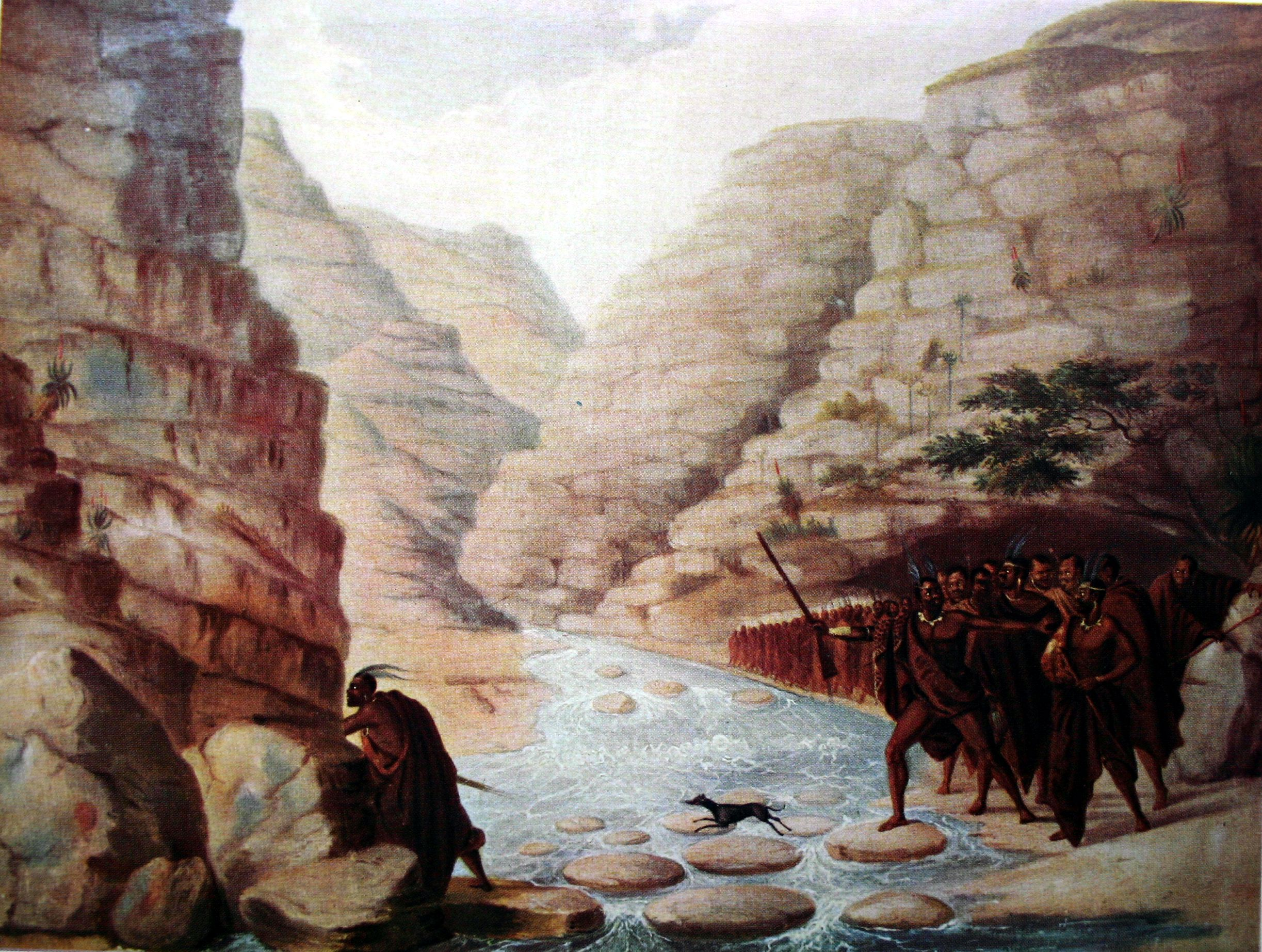
- A column of Xhosa warriors, crossing a ravine in the frontier mountains
| Date | 1779–1879 |
| Location | Southern Africa |
| Result | British and Dutch victory |
| Territorial changes | Expansion of the Cape Colony |

Belligerents
| Xhosa Kingdom | British Empire; Dutch Empire: Dutch Cape Colony (1st and 2nd); Trekboers; British Cape Colony (4th to 9th) |

The Xhosa Wars (Note: Also known as the Cape Frontier Wars, Kaffir Wars, or Hundred Years' War.) were a series of nine wars (from 1779 to 1879) between the Xhosa Kingdom and the British Empire as well as Trekboers from the Dutch colonial empire in what is now the Eastern Cape in South Africa.

Tensions existed between the various Europeans in the Cape region, tensions between Empire administration and colonial governments, and tensions within the Xhosa Kingdom, e.g. chiefs rivaling each other, which usually led to Europeans taking advantage of the situation to meddle in Xhosa politics. A perfect example of this is the case of chief Ngqika and his uncle, chief Ndlambe.

The conflicts between the Xhosa and British were covered extensively in the metropolitan British press, generating increased demand among the British public for information about their country's far-off colonial conflicts.

== Background ==
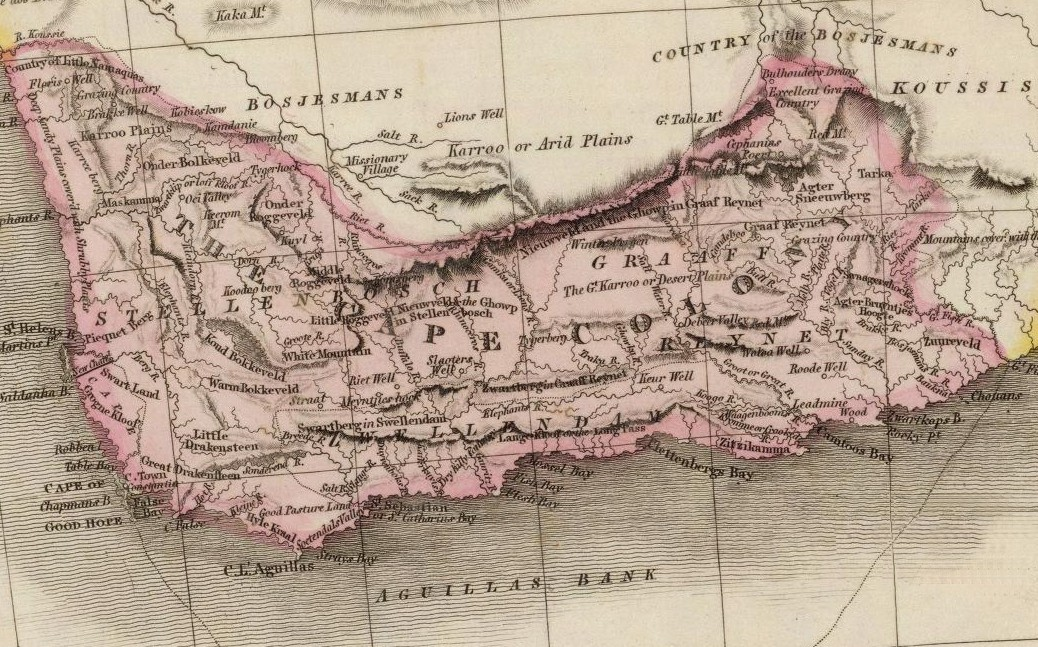
Map of the Cape Colony in 1809, showing its eastward expansion

The first European colonial settlement in modern-day South Africa was a small supply station established by the Dutch East India Company in 1652 at present-day Cape Town as a place for their merchant ships to resupply en route to and from the East Indies and Japan. Quickly expanding as a result of increasing numbers of Dutch, German, and Huguenot immigrants, the supply station soon expanded into a burgeoning settler colony. Colonial expansion from the Cape into the valleys led to the Khoikhoi–Dutch Wars between encroaching trekboers and the Khoekhoe.

By the second half of the 18th century, European colonists gradually expanded eastward up the coast and encountered the Xhosa in the region of the Great Fish River. The Xhosa were already established in the area and herded cattle, which led to tensions between them and the colonists; these tensions were the primary reason for the Cape Frontier Wars. The Dutch East India Company had demarcated the Great Fish River as the eastern boundary of the colony in 1779, though this was ignored by many settlers, leading to the First Cape Frontier War breaking out.

== Early conflicts ==
=== First war (1779–81) ===
The First Frontier War broke out in 1779 between Boer frontiersmen and the amaXhosa. In December 1779, an armed clash occurred, resulting from allegations of cattle theft by Xhosa people. In November 1780, the Cape governor, Baron van Plettenberg declared that the eastern border of the Cape colony was the entire length of the Great Fish river despite many amaXhosa polities being already established west of the river, and no negotiations involving this decision were made with them beforehand. Van Plettenberg appointed Adreaan Van Jaarsveld to lead commandoes to force the Xhosa to move east of the river, if they were unresponsive to requests to do so. This led to multiple attacks by the commandoes to forcefully remove Xhosa polities out of the area. When the imiDange refused to move, Van Jaarsveld and his commandoes had their chief, Jalamba, agree to another meeting for discussions. During the meeting he scattered large amounts of tobacco around and let the Xhosa have it. While some were distracted picking up the tobacco, Van Jaarsveld and his gunmen proceeded to shoot at them leading to a death toll of anywhere from 100 to 200, including Jalamba. Soon after this, the Van Jaarsveld commandoes began attacking and looting the cattle of multiple other chiefdoms in the Zuurveld which included the amaGwali, amaNtinde, and amaMbalu. A large amount of the Xhosa population west of the river became dispersed, and Van Jaarsveld disbanded his commandoes on July 19, 1781, feeling he had fulfilled his job of expelling the Xhosa although many of them were able to move back into the area soon after.

=== Second war (1789–93) ===
The second war involved a larger territory. It started when the Gqunukhwebe clans of the Xhosa started to penetrate back into the Zuurveld, a district between the Great Fish and the Sundays Rivers. Some frontiersmen, under Barend Lindeque, allied themselves with Ndlambe (regent of the Western Xhosas) to repel the Gqunukhwebe. Panic ensued and farms were abandoned.

== Start of British involvement ==
=== Third war (1799–1803) ===
The third war started in January 1799 with a Xhosa rebellion that General Thomas Pakenham Vandeleur crushed. Discontented Khoikhoi then revolted, joined with the Xhosa in the Zuurveld, and started attacking, raiding farms occupied by European and Dutch settlers, reaching Oudtshoorn by July 1799. Commandos from Graaf-Reinet and Swellendam then started fighting in a string of clashes. The government then made peace with the Xhosa and allowed them to stay in the Zuurveld. In 1801, another Graaff-Reinet rebellion started forcing more Khoi desertions and farm abandonments. The commandos could achieve no result, so in February 1803 a peace was arranged, leaving the Xhosas still in the big Zuurveld.

=== Fourth War (1811–12) ===
The Fourth War was the second experienced under British rule. The Zuurveld acted as a buffer zone between the Cape Colony and Xhosa territory, empty of the Boers and British to the east and the Xhosa to the west. In 1811, the Xhosa occupied the area, and flashpoint conflicts with encroaching settlers followed. An expeditionary force under the command of Colonel John Graham drove the Xhosa back beyond the Fish River in an effort that the first Governor of the Cape Colony, Lieutenant-General John Cradock, characterized as involving no more bloodshed "than was necessary to impress on the minds of these savages a proper degree of terror and respect". About four thousand 1820 Settlers subsequently (after the fifth war) settled on the Fish River. "Graham's Town" arose on the site of Colonel Graham's headquarters; in time this became Grahamstown.

=== Fifth War (1818–19) ===
The fifth frontier war, also known as the "War of Nxele", initially developed from an 1817 judgment by the Cape Colony government about stolen cattle and their restitution by the Xhosa. An issue of ducks and geese overcrowding the area brought on a civil war between the Ngqika (royal clan of the Rharhabe Xhosa) and the Gcaleka Xhosa (those that remained in their homeland). A Cape Colony-Ngqika defence treaty legally required military assistance to the Ngqika request (1818).

The Xhosa prophet Nxele (also known as Makhanda) emerged at this time and promised "to turn bullets into water". Under the command of Mdushane, AmaNdlambe's son, Nxele led a 10,000 Xhosa force attack (22 April 1819) on Grahamstown, which was held by 350 troops. A Khoikhoi group led by Jan Boesak enabled the garrison to repulse Nxele, who suffered the loss of 1,000 Xhosa. Nxele was eventually captured and imprisoned on Robben Island.

The British colonial authorities pushed the Xhosa further east beyond the Fish River to the Keiskamma River. The resulting empty territory was designated as a buffer zone for loyal Africans' settlements, but was declared to be off limits for either side's military occupation. It came to be known as the "Ceded Territories". The Albany district was established in 1820, on the Cape's side of the Fish River, and was populated with some 5,000 settlers. The Grahamstown battle site continues to be called "Egazini" ("Place of Blood"), and a monument was erected there for the fallen Xhosa in 2001. (Note: As of 2016 the Egazini monument has been vandalised and is in a bad state)

==== Battle of Amalinde ====
During the Fifth Frontier War in 1818, after a two-decade long conflict, King Ngqika ka Mlawu and his uncle Ndlambe's people clashed again in a battle called the Battle of Amalinde over several issues, including land ownership. The king appointed his eldest son Maqoma (despite him lacking experience in battle) and the renowned Jingqi to lead the fight that lasted from midday to the evening. Ngqika was defeated, losing about 500 men during what is considered by some as one of the most historical battles in Southern Africa.

== Sixth war (1834–36) ==
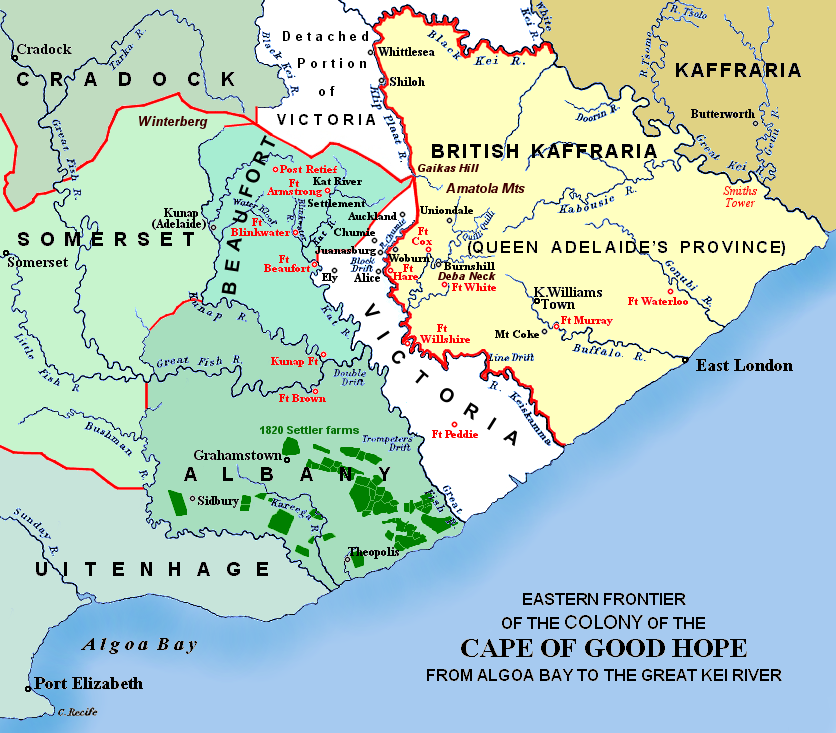
Eastern frontier of the colony, c. 1835 Settled colonial area, showing districts established in 1820 (in various shades) Neutral zone since 1820, as agreed by Lord Somerset and the Gaika (Xhosa) Tribal areas under British administration Military forts and district boundaries

The earlier Xhosa Wars did not quell British-Xhosa tension in the Cape's eastern border at the Keiskamma River. Insecurity persisted because the Xhosa remained expelled from territory (especially the so-called "Ceded Territories") that was then settled by Europeans and other African peoples. They were also subjected to territorial expansions from other Africans that were themselves under pressure from the expanding Zulu Kingdom. Nevertheless, the frontier region was seeing increasing amounts of admixture between Europeans, Khoikhoi, and Xhosa living and trading throughout the frontier region. The vacillation by the Cape Government's policy towards the return of the Xhosa to areas they previously inhabited did not dissipate Xhosa frustration toward the inability to provide for themselves, and they thus resorted to frontier cattle-raiding.

=== Outbreak ===
Cape responses to the Xhosa cattle raids varied, but in some cases were drastic and violent. On 11 December 1834, a Cape government commando party killed a chief of high rank, incensing the Xhosa: an army of 10,000 men, led by Maqoma, a brother of the chief who had been killed, swept across the frontier into the Cape Colony, pillaged and burned the homesteads, and killed all who resisted. Among the worst sufferers was a colony of freed Khoikhoi who, in 1829, had been settled in the Kat River Valley by the British authorities. Refugees from the farms and villages took to the safety of Grahamstown, where women and children found refuge in the church.

=== British campaign ===
The response was swift and multifaceted. Boer commandos mobilised under Piet Retief and inflicted a defeat on the Xhosa in the Winterberg Mountains in the north. Burgher and Khoi commandos also mobilised, and British Imperial troops arrived via Algoa Bay.

The British governor, Sir Benjamin d'Urban, mustered the combined forces under Colonel Sir Harry Smith, who reached Grahamstown on 6 January 1835, six days after news of the attack had reached Cape Town. It was from Grahamstown that the retaliatory campaign was launched and directed.

The campaign inflicted a string of defeats on the Xhosa, such as at Trompetter's Drift on the Fish River, and most of the Xhosa chiefs surrendered. However, the two primary Xhosa leaders, Maqoma and Tyali, retreated to the fastnesses of the Amatola Mountains.

=== Terms of the treaty ===
British governor Sir Benjamin d'Urban believed that Hintsa ka Khawuta, King of the amaXhosa, commanded authority over all of the Xhosa tribes and therefore held him responsible for the initial attack on the Cape Colony, and for the looted cattle. D'Urban came to the frontier in May 1835, and led a large force across the Kei river to confront Hintsa at his Great Place and dictate terms to him.

The terms stated that all the country from the Cape's prior frontier, the Keiskamma River, as far as the Great Kei River, was annexed as the British "Queen Adelaide Province", and its inhabitants declared British subjects. A site for the seat of the province's government was selected and named King William's Town. The new province was declared to be for the settlement of loyal tribes, rebel tribes who replaced their leadership, and the Fengu (known to the Europeans as the "Fingo people"), who had recently arrived fleeing from the Zulu armies and had been living under Xhosa subjection. Magistrates were appointed to administer the territory in the hope that they would gradually, with the help of missionaries, undermine tribal authority. Hostilities finally died down on 17 September 1836, after having continued for nine months.

=== The killing of King Hintsa ===
Hintsa was the King of the Xhosa Kingdom and was recognised as Paramount by all Xhosa-speaking tribes and states in the Cape; his death proved to be an enduring memory in the collective imagination of the Xhosa nation. Originally assured of his personal safety during the treaty negotiations, Hintsa rapidly found himself held hostage and pressured with massive demands for cattle "restitution". Other sources say he offered himself as a hostage until the indemnity was paid and even suggested that he accompany Colonel Smith in collecting Xhosa cattle. He attempted to escape at the Nqabarha River but was pursued, pulled off his horse, and immobilized with shots through the back and the leg. Immediately, a soldier named George Southey (brother of colonial administrator Sir Richard Southey) came up behind Hintsa and shot him in the back of the head; furthermore, Hintsa's ears were cut off after his death. Other sources say his horse bolted and Harry Smith tried to shoot the fleeing man but both his pistols misfired. Giving chase, he caught hold of Hintsa and dragged him heavily to the ground. Hintsa was still full of fight. "He was jabbing at me furiously with his assegai," Colonel Smith recalled in his autobiography, and the king succeeded in breaking away to find cover in a nearby stream bed. There, while pleading for mercy, the top of his skull was blown off by one of Smith's officers; his corpse was subsequently badly mutilated by Smith and his men. These actions shocked the government in London, which condemned and repudiated Governor D'Urban. Hintsa's killing angered the Xhosa for decades thereafter.

=== Aftermath ===
By the end of the sixth war, 7,000 people of all races were left homeless.

The settlement of the Fengu in the annexed territory had far-reaching consequences. This wandering peoples claimed to be escaping oppression at the hands of the Gcaleka and, in return for the land they were given by the Cape, they became the Cape Colony's formidable allies. They swiftly acquired firearms and formed mounted commandos for the defense of their new land. In the following wars, they fought alongside the Cape Colony as invaluable allies, not as subordinates, and won considerable renown and respect for their martial ability.

The conflict was the catalyst for Piet Retief's manifesto and the Great Trek. In total, 40 farmers (Boers) were killed and 416 farmhouses were burnt down. In addition, 5,700 horses, 115,000 head of cattle, and 162,000 sheep were plundered by Xhosa tribespeople. In retaliation, sixty thousand Xhosa cattle were taken or retaken by colonists.

The British minister of colonies, Lord Glenelg, repudiated d'Urban's actions and accused the Boer retaliation against cattle raiders as being what instigated the conflict. As a result, the Boer community lost faith in the British justice system and often took the law into their own hands when cattle rustlers were caught.

The territorial expansion and creation of "Queen Adelaide Province" was also condemned by London as being uneconomical and unjust. The province was disannexed in December 1836, the Cape's border was re-established at the Keiskamma river, and new treaties were made with the chiefs responsible for order beyond the Fish River.

== Interlude: Stockenström's treaty system ==
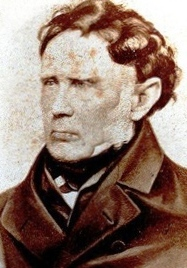
Sir Andries Stockenström, 1st Baronet, and veteran of several Xhosa wars

In the aftermath of the previous frontier war, the new lieutenant-governor of the Eastern Province, Andries Stockenström, instituted a completely new border policy. Stockenström, who professed considerable respect for the Xhosa, developed a system of formal treaties to guard the border and return any stolen cattle from either side (cattle raiding was a regular grievance). Diplomatic agents were exchanged between the Cape Colony and the Xhosa Chiefs as reliable "ambassadors", and colonial expansion into Xhosa land was forbidden. Land annexed from the Xhosa in the previous war was also returned and the displaced Xhosa moved back into this land, assuaging overpopulation in the Xhosa territories.

In the framework of this new system, the frontier settled and saw nearly a decade of peace. The Xhosa chiefs generally honoured Stockenström's treaty and returned any cattle that their people had raided. On the Cape side, Stockenström, who saw the major problem as being the land management of the colonists, used his influence to rein in the frontier settlers and prevent any expansion onto Xhosa land. A level of trust also began to develop, and the Xhosa chiefs came to hold Stockenström in exceptionally high regard as a man who, although he had defeated the Xhosa armies on multiple occasions, nonetheless treated them as diplomatic equals.

The treaty system began to unravel as the settlers gained a determined leader and spokesman in the form of Robert Godlonton, who led a large colonist movement to dismantle Stockenström's system and allow seizure of Xhosa lands. As one settler declared of the Xhosa territory: "The appearance of the country is very fine, it will make excellent sheep farms." Godlonton also used his considerable influence in the religious institutions of the Cape to drive his opinions, declaring that: "the British race was selected by God himself to colonize Kaffraria".

In the face of massive pressure and ruinous lawsuits, Stockenström was eventually dismissed and the new governor of the Cape Colony, Maitland, abrogated the treaties.

== Seventh war (1846–47) ==
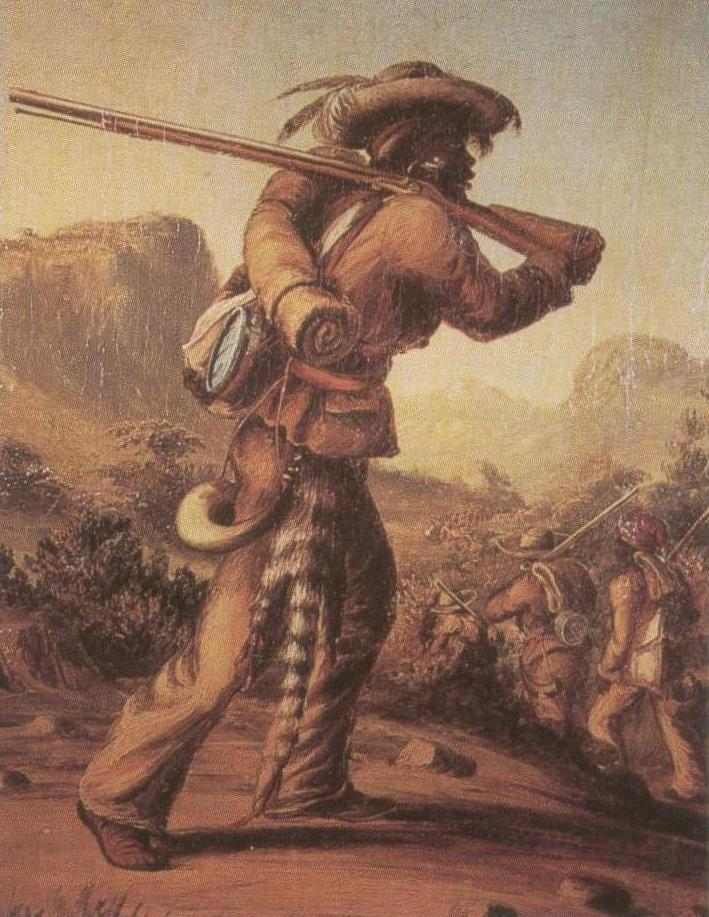
The Fengu ("Fingoes"), known across southern Africa as skilled gunmen, were invaluable allies of the Cape Colony in its frontier wars.

The Seventh Xhosa War is often referred to as the "War of the Axe" or the "Amatola War". On the colonial side, two main groups were involved: columns of imperial British troops sent from London, and local mixed-race "Burgher forces", which were mainly Khoi, Fengu, British settlers and Boer commandos, led by their commander-in-chief, Andries Stockenström. Relations between the Imperial troops and local commandos broke down completely during the war.

On the Xhosa side, the Ngqika (known to the Europeans as the "Gaika") were the chief tribe engaged in the war, assisted by portions of the Ndlambe and the Thembu. The Xhosa forces were greater in number, and some of them had by this time replaced their traditional weapons with firearms; both sides engaged in the widespread use of scorched earth tactics. The conflict was also marked by several massacres of Xhosa and Thembu people by European settlers, regular forces and Khoekhoe and Fengu auxiliaries. Many of these were justified as retribution for earlier Xhosa attacks on colonial settlements and for the Xhosa's oppression and mistreatment of the Fengu as second-class citizens following their exodus as refugees from the violence of the Mfecane into the Xhosa Kingdom. Regular forces which served in the war characterized Xhosa warriors as "treacherous savages and merciless barbarians", and after the war successive governors used these characterizations as justifications to impose ever more stringent policies on the Xhosa.

King Sandile kaNgqika led the Ngqika people in the Seventh Frontier War (1846–47), Eighth Frontier War (1850–53) and the Ninth Frontier War (1877–78), in which he was killed. These clashes marked the beginning of the use of firearms by Xhosa armies, scoring many victories for King Sandile, gaining him a reputation as a Xhosa hero and mighty warrior.

=== Background ===
Tension had been simmering between farmers and marauders, on both sides of the frontier, since the dismantlement of Stockenstrom's treaty system. Governor Maitland imposed a new system of treaties on the chiefs without consulting them, while a severe drought forced desperate Xhosa to engage in cattle raids across the frontier in order to survive. In addition, politician Robert Godlonton continued to use his newspaper the Graham's Town Journal to agitate for Eastern Cape settlers to annex and settle the land that had been returned to the Xhosa after the previous war.

The event that actually ignited the war was a trivial dispute over a raid. A Khoi escort was transporting a manacled Xhosa thief to Grahamstown to be tried for stealing an axe, when Xhosa raiders attacked and killed the Khoi escort. The Xhosa refused to surrender the murderer and war broke out in March 1846.

=== Initial British setbacks ===
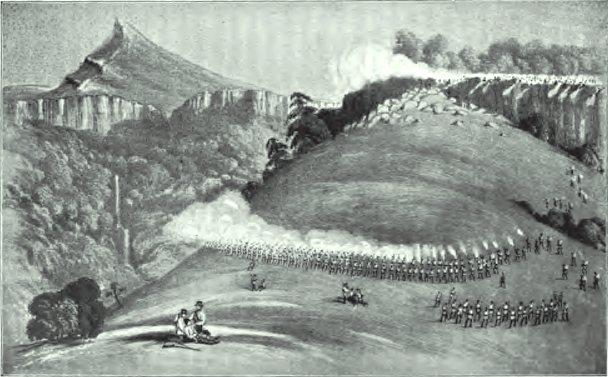
Sketch of the shoot-out as British Imperial Troops attempt to storm Sandile's position in the Amatola Mountains.

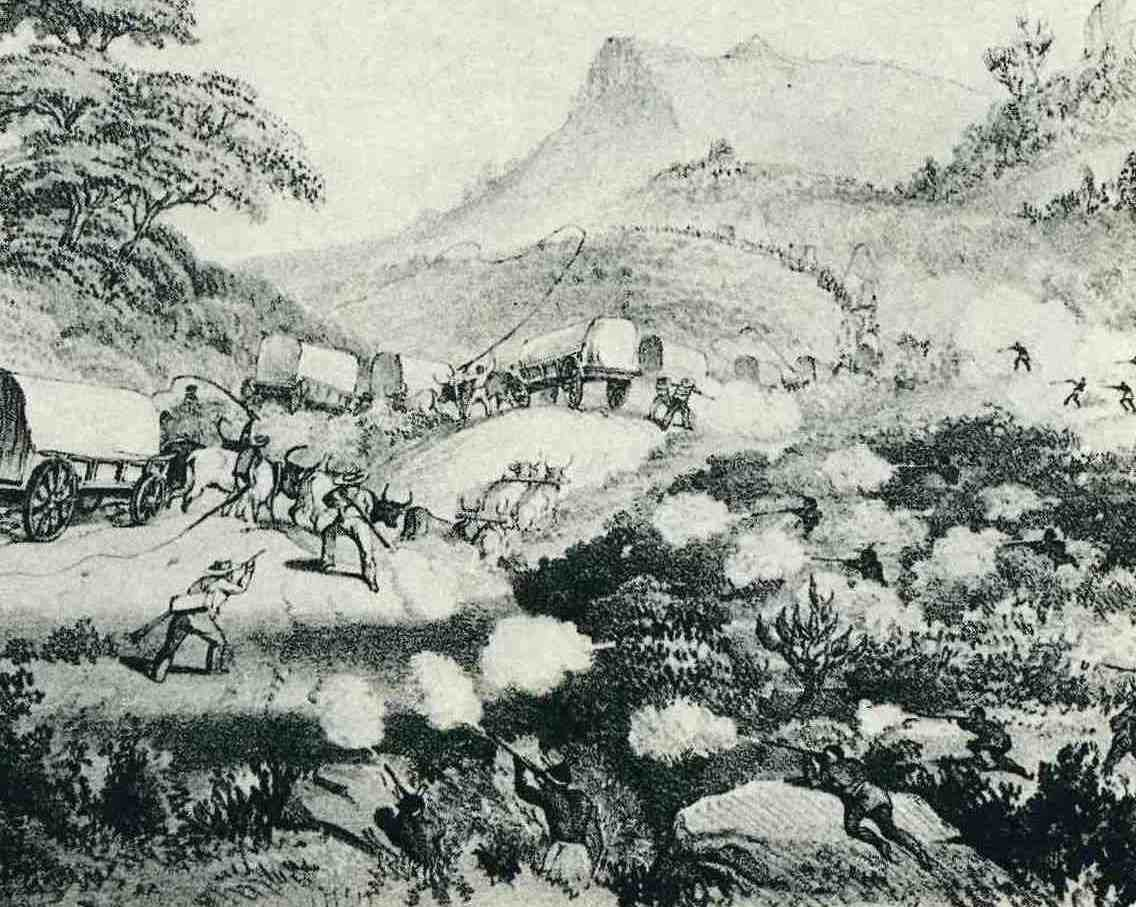
Shoot-out between Xhosa and a British army column.

The regular British forces suffered initial setbacks. A British column sent to confront the Rharhabe King, Sandile kaNgqika, was delayed at the Amatola Mountains, and the attacking Xhosa captured the centre of the three-mile long wagon train which was not being defended, carrying away the British officers' supply of wine and other supplies. Large numbers of Xhosa then poured across the border as the outnumbered imperial troops fell back, abandoning their outposts. The only successful resistance was from the local Fengu, who defended their villages from the Xhosa forces.

On 28 May, a force of 8,000 Xhosa attacked the last remaining British garrison, at Fort Peddie, but fell back after a long shootout with British and Fengu troops. The Xhosa army then marched on Grahamstown itself, but was held up when a sizable army of Ndlambe Xhosa were defeated on 7 June 1846 by General Somerset on the Gwangu, a few miles from Fort Peddie. However the slow-moving British columns, were considerably hampered by drought and were becoming desperate. After much debate, they were forced to call in Stockenström and the local Burgher forces.

=== The local Burghers' campaign ===
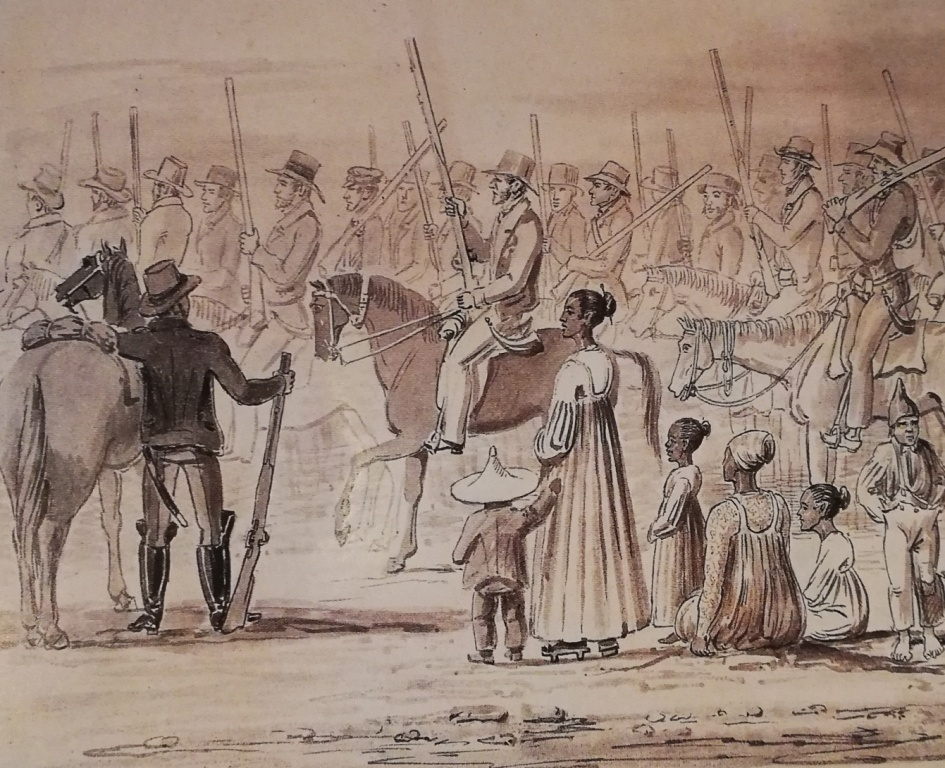
Cape Mounted Burghers, or "kommando," assembling for action in 1846 during the Seventh Xhosa War.

The local Commandos were much more effective in the rough and mountainous terrain, of which they had considerable local knowledge.

After inflicting a string of defeats on the Ngqika, Stockenström took a small and select group of his mounted commandos across the Colony's border and rapidly pushed into the independent Xhosa lands beyond the frontier. They rode deep into the Transkei Xhosa heartland, directly towards the kraal of Sarhili ("Kreli"), the paramount chief of all the Xhosa. Due in part to the speed of their approach, they were barely engaged by Xhosa forces and rode directly into Sarhili's capital.

Paramount Chief Sarhili and his generals agreed to meet Stockenström (with his commandants Groepe, Molteno and Brownlee), unarmed, on a nearby mountain ridge. The meeting was initially tense – the fathers of both Sarhili and Stockenström had been killed whilst unarmed. Both men were also veterans of several frontier wars against each other and, while they treated each other with extreme respect, Stockenström nonetheless made the extreme demand that Sarhili assume responsibility for any future Ngqika attacks.

After protracted negotiations, Sarhili agreed to return any raided cattle & other property and to relinquish claims to the Ngqika land west of the Kei. He also promised to use his limited authority over the frontier Ngqika to restrain cross-border attacks. A treaty was signed and the commandos departed on good terms.

Also leading his commando on this campaign was a young man named John Molteno, who in later life became the Cape's first Prime Minister. Significantly, his experience of what he believed to be the ineptitude and injustice of the British Empire's frontier policy later informed his government's decisions to oppose the British in the final frontier war.

=== Later stage of the conflict ===
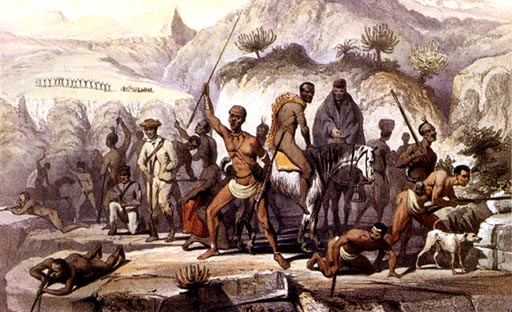
Xhosas defend a stronghold in the forested Water Kloof during the Eighth Xhosa War in 1851. Xhosa, Kat River Khoi-khoi and some army deserters are depicted

However, General Peregrine Maitland rejected the treaty and sent an insulting letter back to the Xhosa paramount-chief, demanding greater acts of submission and servility. Furious, Stockenström and his local commandos resigned and departed from the war, leaving the British and the Xhosa – both starving and afflicted by fever – to a long, drawn-out war of attrition.

The effects of the drought were worsened through the use, by both sides, of scorched earth tactics. Gradually, as the armies weakened, the conflict subsided into waves of petty and bloody recriminations. At one point, violence flared up again after Ngqika tribesmen supposedly stole four goats from the neighbouring Kat River Settlement. When the rains came, floods turned the surrounding lands into a quagmire. The violence slowly wound down as both sides weakened, immobile and fever-ridden.

The war continued until Sandile was captured during negotiations and sent to Grahamstown. Although Sandile was soon released, the other chiefs gradually stopped fighting, and by the end of 1847 the Xhosa had been completely subdued after 21 months of fighting.

In the last month of the war (December 1847) Sir Harry Smith reached Cape Town as governor of the colony, and on the 23rd, at a meeting of the Xhosa chiefs, announced the annexation of the country between the Keiskamma and the Kei rivers to the British crown, thus reabsorbing the territory abandoned by order of Lord Glenelg. It was not, however, incorporated with the Cape Colony, but made a crown dependency under the name of British Kaffraria Colony, with King William's Town as capital.

== Eighth war (1850–1853) ==
=== Background ===
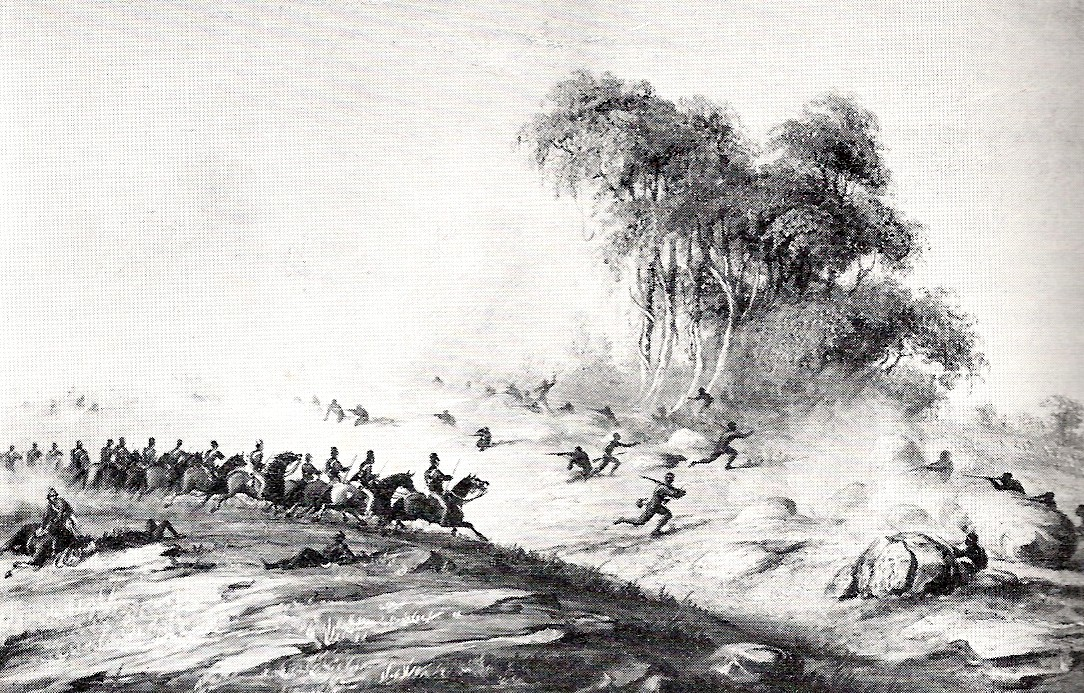
The Cape Mounted Riflemen charging the enemy at Waterkloof during the 8th Frontier War

Large numbers of Xhosa were displaced across the Keiskamma by Governor Harry Smith, and these refugees supplemented the original inhabitants there, causing overpopulation and hardship. Those Xhosa who remained in the colony were moved to towns and encouraged to adopt European lifestyles.

Smith also attacked and annexed the Orange Free State, hanging Boer leaders who resisted him, and in the process alienating the Burghers of the Cape Colony. To cover the mounting expenses he then imposed exorbitant taxes on the local people of the frontier and cut the Cape's standing forces to less than five thousand men.

In June 1850 there followed an unusually cold winter, together with an extreme drought. It was at this time that Smith ordered the displacement of large numbers of Xhosa squatters from the Kat River region.

The war became known as "Mlanjeni's War", after the prophet Mlanjeni who arose among the homeless Xhosa, and who predicted that the Xhosa would be unaffected by the colonists' bullets. Large numbers of Xhosa began leaving the colony's towns and mobilizing in the tribal areas.

=== The Outbreak of War (December 1850) ===
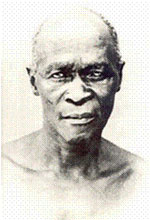
Chief Maqoma. Xhosa military leader in several of the frontier wars

Believing that the chiefs were responsible for the unrest caused by Mlanjeni's preaching, Smith travelled to meet with the prominent chiefs. When Sandile refused to attend a meeting outside Fort Cox, Smith deposed him and declared him a fugitive. On 24 December, a British detachment of 650 men under Colonel Mackinnon was attacked by Xhosa warriors in the Boomah Pass. The party was forced to retreat to Fort White, under attack from the Xhosa, having sustained forty-two casualties. The very next day, during Christmas festivities in towns throughout the border region, apparently friendly Xhosa entered the towns to partake in the festivities. At a given signal though, they fell upon the settlers who had invited them into their homes and killed them. With this attack, the bulk of the Ngqika joined the war.

=== Initial Xhosa victories ===
While the Governor was still at Fort Cox, the Xhosa forces advanced on the colony, isolating him there. The Xhosa burned British military villages along the frontier and captured the post at Line Drift. Meanwhile, the Khoi of the Blinkwater River Valley and Kat River Settlement revolted, under the leadership of a half-Khoi, half-Xhosa chief Hermanus Matroos, and managed to capture Fort Armstrong. Large numbers of the "Kaffir Police" – a paramilitary police force the British had established to combat cattle theft – deserted their posts and joined Xhosa war parties. For a while, it appeared that while the Xhosa declared war, Khoi people of the eastern Cape were also fighting and taking up arms against the British.

Smith finally fought his way out of Fort Cox with the help of the local Cape Mounted Riflemen, but found that he had alienated most of his local allies. His policies had made enemies of the Burghers and Boer Commandos, the Fengu, and the Khoi, who formed much of the Cape's local defences. Even some of the Cape Mounted Riflemen refused to fight.

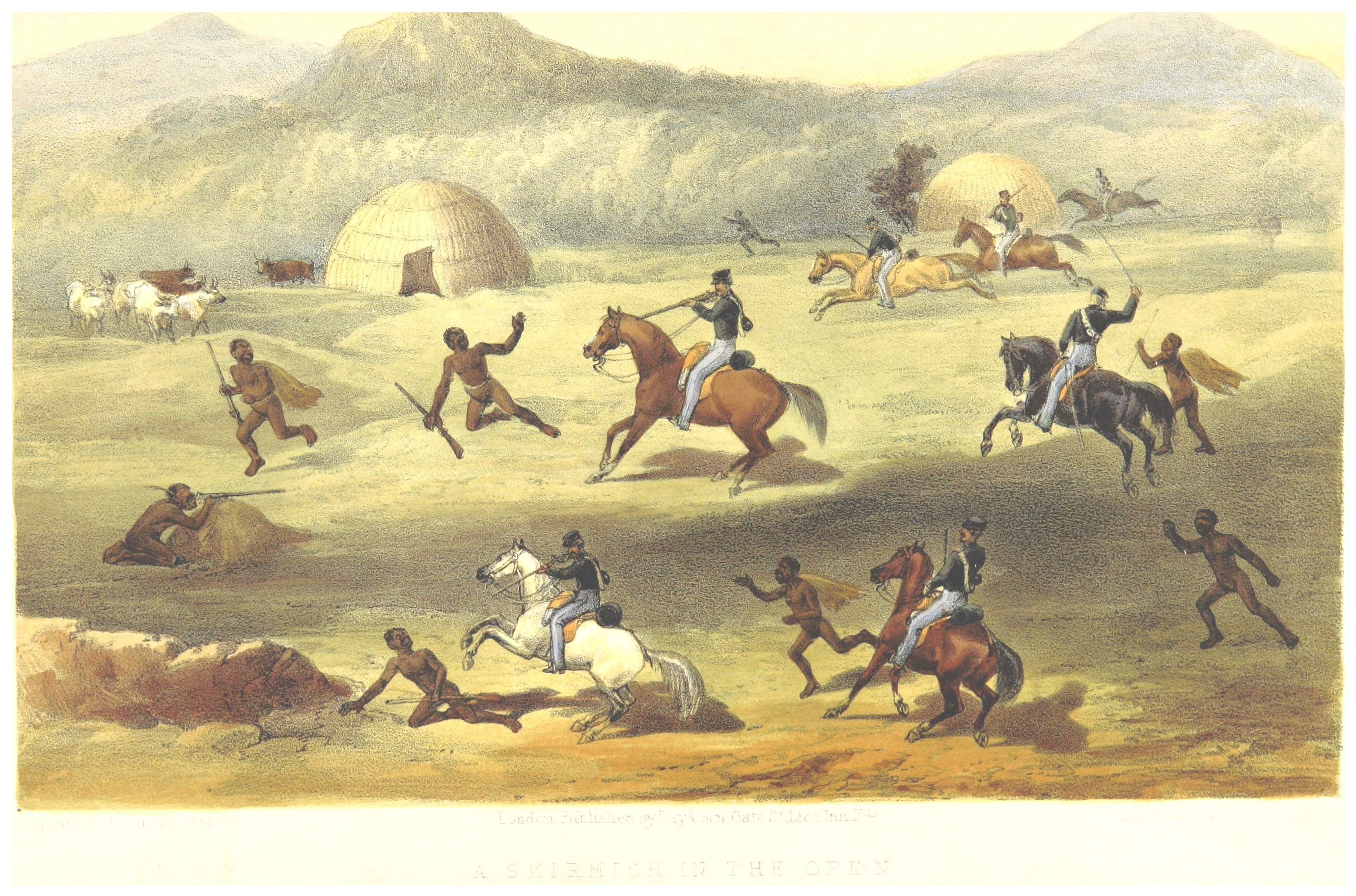
Skirmish during the Xhosa Wars

=== British counter-attack (January 1851) ===
After these initial successes, however, the Xhosa experienced a series of setbacks. Xhosa forces were repulsed in separate attacks on Fort White and Fort Hare. Similarly, on 7 January, Hermanus and his supporters launched an offensive on the town of Fort Beaufort, which was defended by a small detachment of troops and local volunteers. The attack failed however, and Hermanus was killed. The Cape Government also eventually agreed to levy a force of local gunmen (predominantly Khoi) to hold the frontier, allowing Smith to free some imperial troops for offensive action.

By the end of the month of January, the British were beginning to receive reinforcements from Cape Town and a force under Colonel Mackinnon was able to drive north from King William's Town to resupply the beleaguered garrisons at Fort White, Fort Cox and Fort Hare. With fresh men and supplies, the British expelled the remainder of Hermanus' rebel forces (now under the command of Willem Uithaalder) from Fort Armstrong and drove them west toward the Amatola Mountains. Over the coming months, increasing numbers of Imperial troops arrived, reinforcing the heavily outnumbered British and allowing Smith to lead sweeps across the frontier country.

In 1852, HMS Birkenhead was wrecked at Gansbaai while bringing reinforcements to the war at the request of Sir Harry Smith. As the ship sank, the men (mostly new recruits) stood silently in rank, while the women and children were loaded into the lifeboats. They remained in rank as the ship slipped under and over 300 died.

=== Final stages of the conflict ===
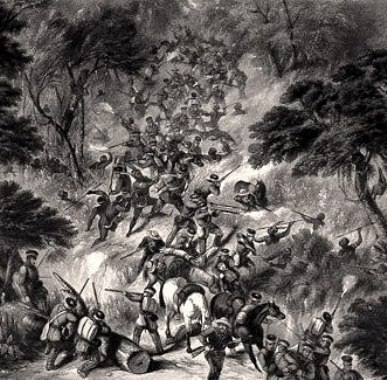
A British column (74th Highlanders) under ambush in the Waterkloof forests

Insurgents led by Maqoma established themselves in the forested Waterkloof. From this base they managed to plunder surrounding farms and torch the homesteads. Maqoma's stronghold was situated on Mount Misery, a natural fortress on a narrow neck wedged between the Waterkloof and Harry's Kloof. The Waterkloof conflicts lasted two years. Maqoma also led an attack on Fort Fordyce and inflicted heavy losses on the forces of Smith.

In February 1852, the British Government decided that Smith's inept rule had been responsible for much of the violence, and ordered him replaced by George Cathcart, who took charge in March. For the last six months, Cathcart ordered scourings of the countryside for rebels. In February 1853, Sandile and the other chiefs surrendered.

The 8th frontier war was the most bitter and brutal in the series of Xhosa wars. It lasted over two years and ended in the complete subjugation of the Ciskei Xhosa.

== Cattle-killing movement (1856–58) ==
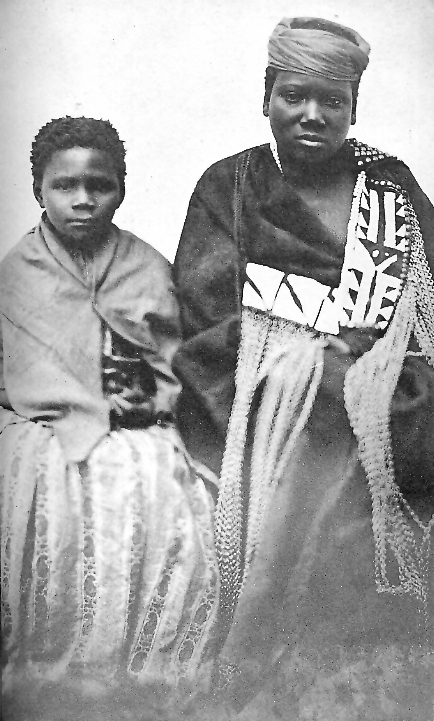
Nongqawuse (right) with fellow prophetess, Nonkosi

The great cattle-killing was a millennialist movement which began among the Xhosa in 1856, and led them to destroy their own means of subsistence in the belief that it would bring about salvation by supernatural spirits.

In April 1856 the 16-year-old Xhosa prophetess Nongqawuse began to declare that she had received a message from the Xhosa people's ancestors, promising deliverance from their hardships. She preached that the ancestors would return from the afterlife in huge numbers, drive all Europeans into the sea, and give the Xhosa bounteous gifts of horses, sheep, goats, dogs, fowls, and all manner of clothing and food in great amounts. They would also restore the elderly to youth and would usher in a utopian era of prosperity. However, she declared that the dead ancestors would only enact this on condition that the Xhosa first destroyed all their means of subsistence. They needed to kill all of their cattle and burn all of their crops.

At first no one believed Nongquwuse's prophecy and the Xhosa nation ignored her prophecy. But when King Sarili kaHintsa began to kill his cattle, more and more people began to believe that Nongquwuse was an igqirha (diviner) who could communicate with the ancestors. They too killed their cattle and destroyed their crops. The cult grew and built up momentum, sweeping across the eastern Cape. The government authorities of the Cape Colony feared chaos, famine and economic collapse, so they desperately appealed in vain to the Xhosa to ignore the prophecies. They even arrested Nongqawuse herself for disturbance caused.

The return of the ancestors was predicted to occur on 18 February 1857. The Xhosa, especially the King, Sarhili, heeded the demand to destroy food sources and clothes and enforced it on others throughout the country. When the day came, the Xhosa nation waited en masse for the momentous events to occur, only to be bitterly disappointed. With no means of subsistence, famine set in.

The cattle killings continued into 1858, leading to the starvation of thousands. Disease was also spread from the cattle killings. This gave the settlers power over the remainder of the Xhosa nation who were often forced to turn to the colonists for food, blankets and other relief.

== Ninth war (1877–79) ==
=== Background ===
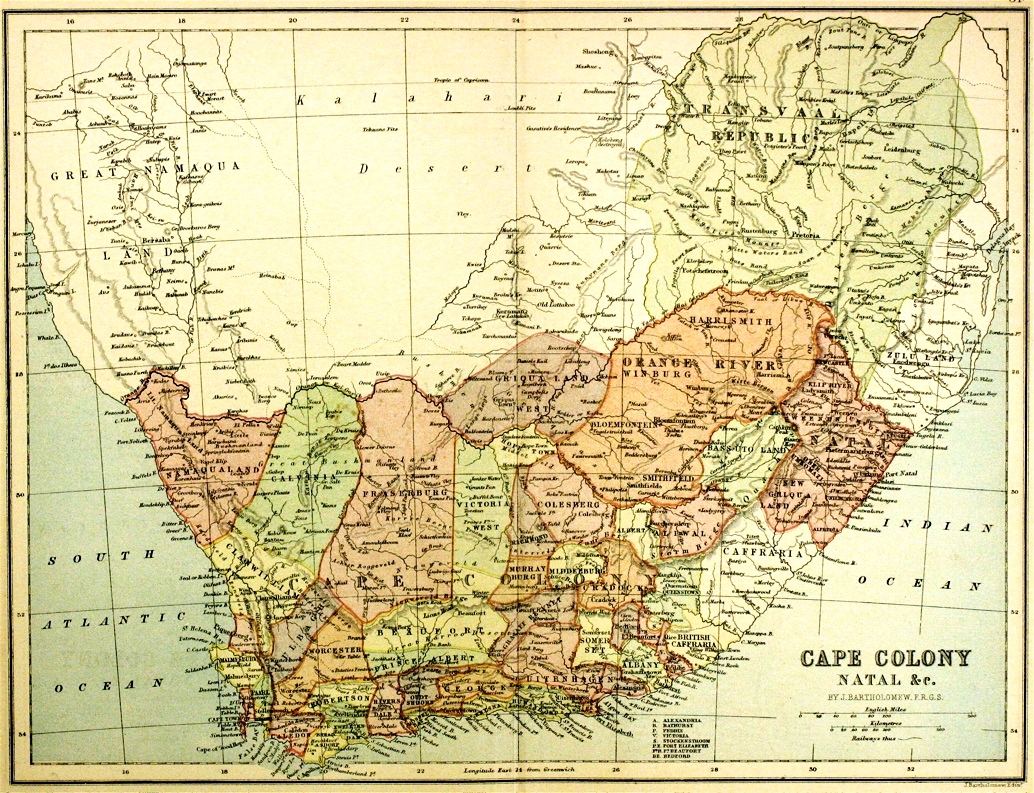
Map of southern Africa on the eve of the final frontier war (1876)

The ninth and final frontier war – also known as the "Fengu-Gcaleka War" or "Ngcayechibi's War", the latter being the name of the headman at whose feast the initial bar fight occurred – involved several competing powers: the Cape Colony Government and its Fengu allies, the British Empire, and the Xhosa armies (Gcaleka and Ngqika). The Cape Colony addressed local needs through their own devices, creating a period of peace and prosperity, and achieved partial independence from Britain with "Responsible Government"; it had relatively little interest in territorial expansion. The frontier was policed lightly using small, highly mobile, mounted mixed-race commandos that were recruited locally from Boer, Fengu, Khoi and settler frontier peoples. The multi-racial franchise, and legal recognition for indigenous systems of land tenure, had also gone some way to easing frontier tensions. Any further intrusion of the British government in Cape affairs to disrupt this state was thought unnecessary and ill-advised.

The British Government sought to increase control in southern Africa by uniting all the states of the region into a Confederation under the overall rule of the British Empire, the same policy that was successfully applied to Canada. This Confederation scheme required that the remaining independent Black States be annexed; a frontier war was seen as an ideal opportunity for such a conquest. Both the Cape Colony and Xhosa shared the view that actions to achieve such a scheme at that time would create instability.

The integration of the Black African population of the frontier into the life patterns and practices of the Cape Colony had developed unevenly. The Fengu had rapidly adapted to and accepted the changes coming to southern Africa by taking to urban trade. The Gcaleka Xhosa resided predominately in the independent Gcaleka land to the east and had suffered greatly from the effects of war, alcoholism and Nongqawuse's cattle killing. They bitterly resented the material success of the Fengu, although some Gcaleka lived within the Cape's borders.

A series of devastating droughts across the Transkei threatened the relative peace which had prevailed for the previous few decades. In the memorable summary of the historian De Kiewiet: "In South Africa, the heat of drought easily becomes the fever of war." The drought had started in 1875 in Gcalekaland and had spread to other parts of the Transkei and Basutoland, as well as to the Cape Colony controlled Ciskei. By 1877, it had become the most severe drought ever recorded. In 1877, political tensions among the Xhosa began to emerge, particularly between the Mfengu, the Thembu and the Gcaleka. A wedding celebration in September 1877 was the scene of a bar fight when the tensions emerged after Gcaleka harassed the Fengu in attendance. Later in the same day, Gcaleka attacked a Cape Colony police outpost, which was manned predominantly by a Fengu ethnic police force.

=== Outbreak ===
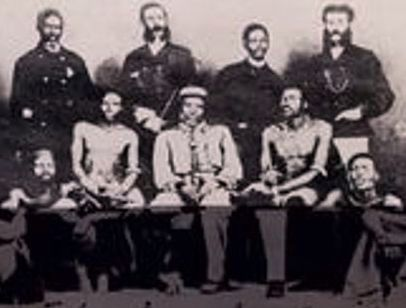
Chief Sarhili (centre seated) was under pressure from belligerent factions of his own government.

In September 1877 the Cape Colony government rejected the second attempt to implement the Confederation scheme, this time put forth by Governor Henry Bartle Frere. The attack by the Gcaleka on the predominantly Fengu ethnic police force at a Cape Colony police outpost was thought by the Cape Colony government as tribal violence best left for local police management. Frere used the incident as a pretext for launching an invasion of the independent neighbouring state of Gcalekaland. Sarhili, the paramount-chief of Gcalekaland, was summoned by Frere, but declined the invitation in fear of arrest and coercion. Frere wrote to him to declare him deposed and at war. Frere contacted radical settler groups who desired further intervention on the Cape frontier, and did not quell rumours of an impending Xhosa invasion.

=== The Cape Colony's War ===
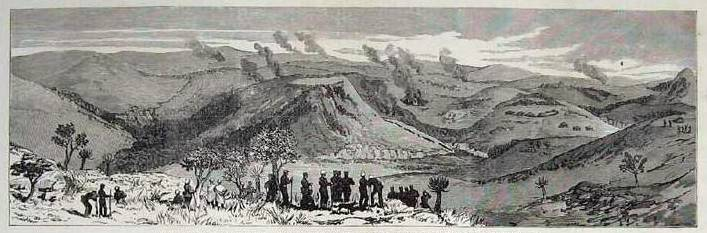
Cape Colony militia – Fengu and Boer – on the frontier, 1878

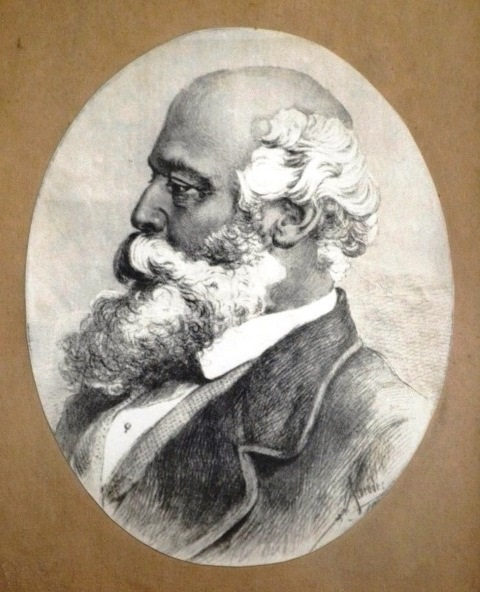
Cape Prime Minister John Molteno, a supporter of local solutions to the conflict.

Chief Sarhili faced intense pressure from belligerent factions within his own government and mobilised his armies for their movement to the frontier. The Cape Government reiterated its insistence that the matter was best left to local resolution and did not constitute an international war for imperial military intervention. High-pressure negotiations by Cape Prime Minister John Charles Molteno extracted a promise from Britain that imperial troops would stay put and on no account cross the frontier. Gcaleka forces of 8000 attacked a Cape police outpost near the frontier at Ibeka; a fierce shoot-out followed but the Gcaleka forces were dispersed. Soon, several other outposts and stations along the frontier were coming under attack. The Cape Government used all available diplomatic leverage it had to prevent imperial forces from crossing the frontier.

The Cape's local paramilitaries (mounted commandos of mainly Boer, Thembu and Fengu origin) were deployed by Molteno under the leadership of Commander Veldman Bikitsha and Chief Magistrate Charles Griffith. The commandos swiftly engaged and defeated an army of Gcaleka gunmen. They then crossed the frontier and pushed into Gcalekaland. Dividing into three lightly equipped, fast-moving columns, the commandos devastated the Gcaleka armies, which dispersed and fled eastwards. The Cape units tracked the fleeing remnants right through Gcalekaland, stopping only when they reached neutral Bomvanaland on the far side. The war was over in three weeks. Sarhili had also recently applied for peace. With few incentives to conquer or occupy the land, and with the violence subsiding, the Cape Government recalled their commandos, who returned home and disbanded.

=== Bartle Frere's War Council ===
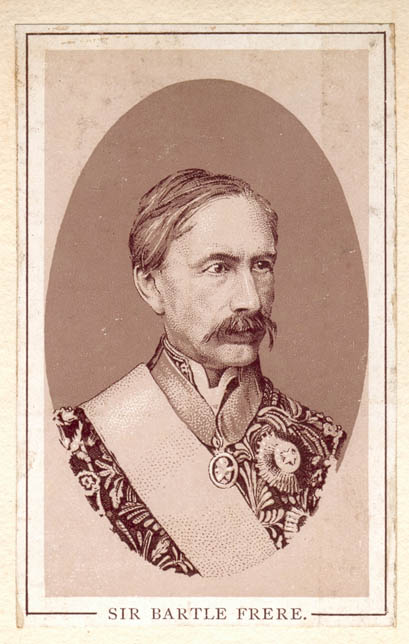
British Governor Bartle Frere sought to annex Gcalekaland to the British Empire.

During the Cape's lightning quick campaign, Governor Frere had established a "war-council" at nearby King William's Town to direct the war against Gcalekaland. Frere and his Lieutenant General Sir Arthur Cunynghame were to represent the British Crown on this council, while two of Molteno's ministers, John X. Merriman and Charles Brownlee, were appointed to represent local Cape interests. The council was torn apart by argument from the beginning, as Frere refused Gcaleka appeals and worked towards full opening of Gcalekaland to white settlement and his future confederation. Frere also increasingly insisted on having complete control of the war.

The Cape government on the other hand was reluctant to see its local Commandos brought under imperial command, in what it considered to be essentially a local border conflict, not an imperial war of conquest. The Cape had only recently attained local democracy and was extremely suspicious of Imperial infringements upon it. It also considered the slow-moving British troop columns to be unsuitable for frontier warfare – immobile, ineffective and vastly more expensive than local Cape forces. This last point of contention was chiefly exacerbated by Frere's insistence that the Cape's government pay for the imperial troops, as well as its own local forces. The Cape Government wanted to fund and use only its own local forces. It did not desire imperial troops to operate in the Cape Colony in the first place, and especially objected to being forced to fund them.

Merriman, who Molteno had appointed to oversee the Cape's war effort, initially worked hard to cooperate with Frere, but increasingly came to share Molteno's hostile views on British imperial policy in southern Africa.

=== The Imperial War ===
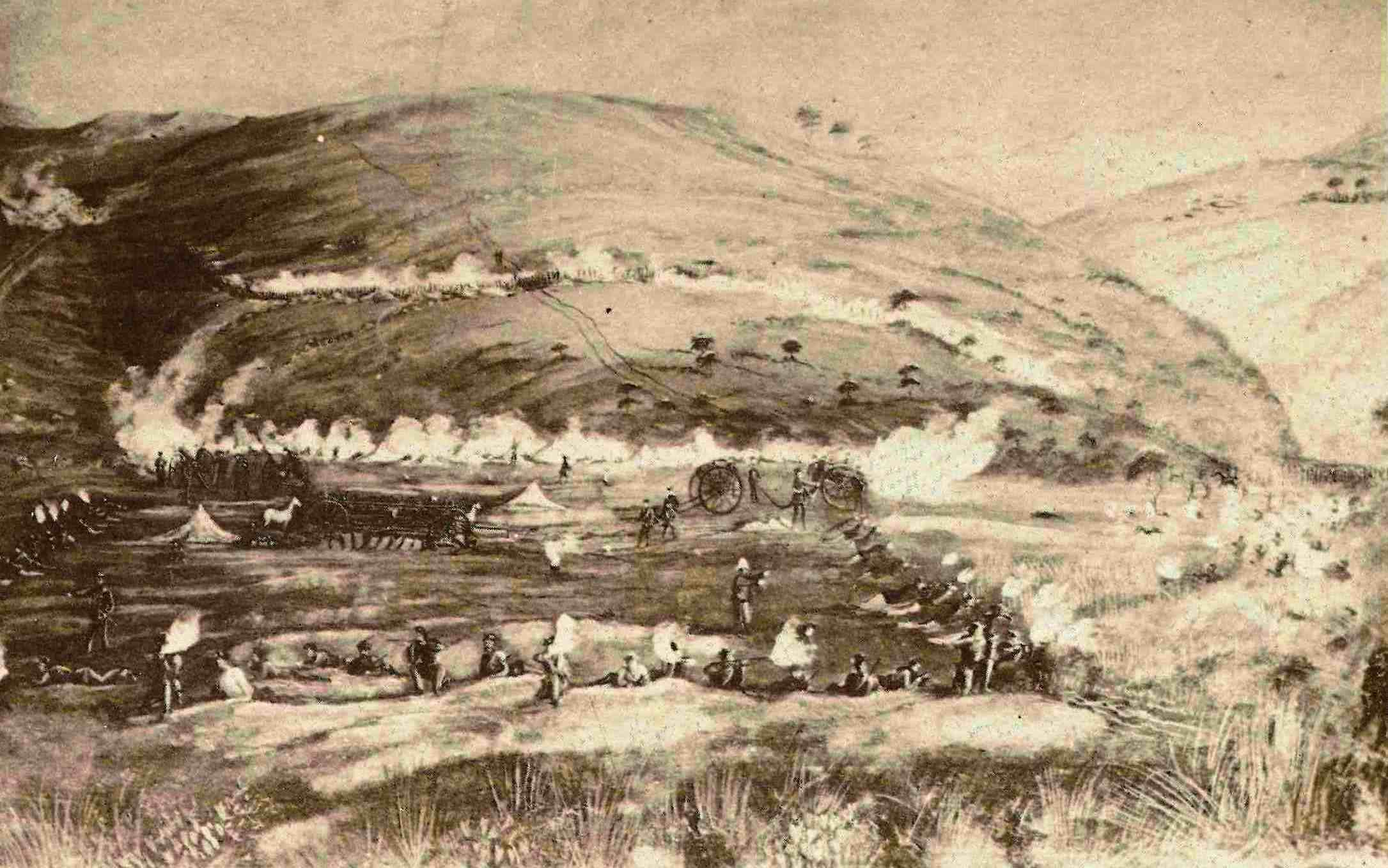
Engagement near Ibika – 1877

The second stage of the war began when Frere ordered the disarmament of all Black peoples of the Cape. There was confusion and uproar from the Cape's many black soldiers and a furious protest from the Cape Government. Militia deserted and protests erupted, in the face of which Cunynghame panicked and overreacted by unilaterally deploying the imperial troops to thinly encircle the whole of British Kaffraria. Faced with growing discontent, the Cape demanded that the British Government fire Cunynghame, abandon its racial disarmament policy, and allow the Cape to deploy its (predominantly black) paramilitaries to establish order. However Frere refused and brought in Imperial troops to enforce the disarmament, and then to invade Gcalekaland once again. This time to annex it and occupy it for the purpose of white settlement.

The British initially attempted to repeat the successful strategy of the Cape's previous campaign. After similarly dividing into three columns, the slow-moving foreign troops soon became disorientated and exhausted. They were unable to engage or even to find the dispersed Gcaleka, who were swiftly moving and regrouping. As the British scoured Gcalekaland, the regrouped Gcaleka army easily slipped past them and crossed the border into the Cape Colony. Here they were joined by Sandile who led his Ngqika nation into rebellion.

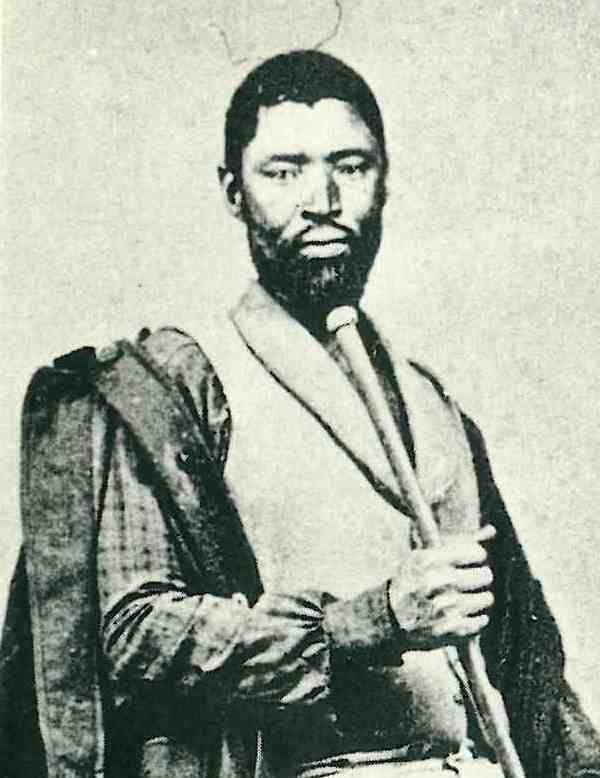
The great King of the Rharhabe, Sandile kaNgqika, veteran of several frontier wars

The combined Xhosa armies laid waste to the frontier region. Fengu towns and other frontier settlements were sacked, supply lines were cut and outposts were evacuated as the British fell back.

Up until now, Molteno had been heavily engaged in a high-level diplomatic battle with Frere to preserve the Cape Colony's constitutional independence. However, with the Cape's frontier collapsing in chaos, he now made for the frontier in person, where he confronted Frere with a heavy condemnation for bad intentions and incompetence. He demanded the free command of the Cape's indigenous forces to operate and contain the violence, making it clear that he was content to sacrifice his job rather than tolerate further interference from Frere.

Frere's next move was to appeal to the authority of the Colonial Office to formally dissolve the elected Cape government, which was now stubbornly standing in his way, and assume direct imperial control over the entire colony.

Increasing numbers of Xhosa armies now poured across the frontier. Towns and farms throughout the region were now burning, and the remaining frontier forts filled with refugees fleeing the invasion. British troops remained thin on the ground as much of them still remained idle in Gcalekaland, where they had been sent for the purpose of occupation.

However Frere was lucky in that he still had access to the frontier militia and Fengu regiments of the Cape Government he had just dissolved. These forces, again under their commander Veldman Bikitsha, managed to engage and finally defeat the Gcaleka on 13 January (near Nyumaxa).

The imperial troops assisted, but were tired, short of rations and unable to follow up on the victory. A subsequent attack was barely repelled on 7 February in the battle of Centane (Kentani or "Centane") with considerable more help from the Fengu and the local Frontier Light Horse militia.

The exhausted Gcaleka finally pulled out from the conflict, but Sandile's rebel Ngqika armies fought on. The rebels eluded the Imperial troops once again and moved into the Amatola mountain range, beginning a final stage of guerrilla warfare. Cunynghame was meanwhile removed from his authority by London, and his replacement, Lieutenant General Thesiger took over command.

=== The Guerrilla War ===
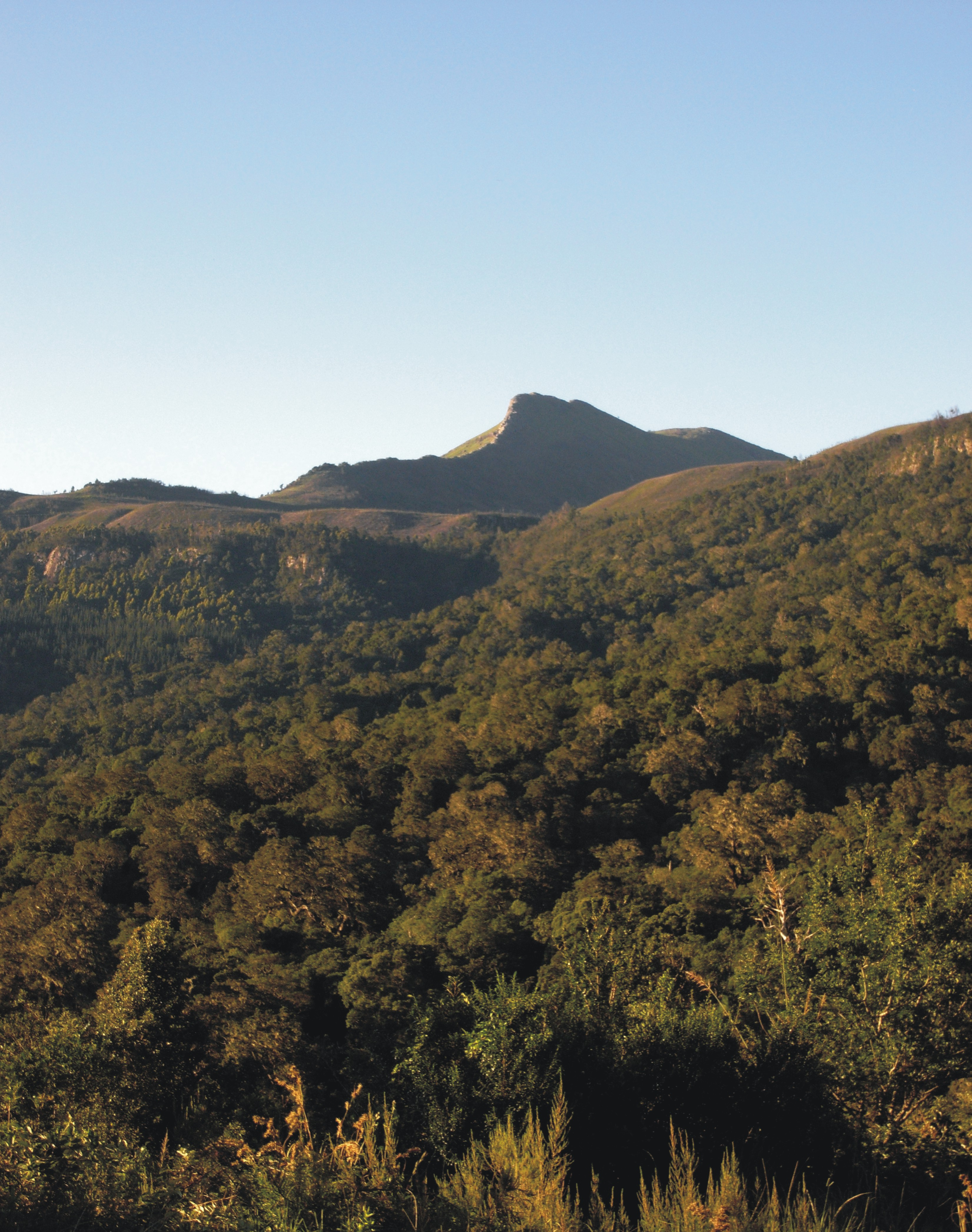
The Amatola Mountains, setting for the final stage of the war.

The Amatola Range had served as a mountain stronghold for Xhosa insurgents many times before, with its vast, dark, creeper-entwined forests.

In March 1878, British troops entered the mountain ranges to pursue Sandile's rebels but were hopelessly outmaneuvered. They were eluded, led astray and ambushed time and time again, as the rebels easily slipped past their slow-moving troop columns. Flag signalling, path systems and other techniques were tried, but to no effect. The British were unfamiliar with the environment and plagued by mismanagement, stretched supply lines, sickness and other hardships. Meanwhile, the local Cape commandos (Boer and Fengu) held back, reluctant to get involved.

Finally the British adopted the strategy which the locals had been recommending from the beginning. This involved dividing the vast territory into 11 military provinces and stationing a mounted garrison in each. If a rebel regiment was encountered it was chased, until it entered the next military province, where the next garrison (fresh and close to supplies) would take over the pursuit. The valley exits from the range were then fortified. Under this uninterrupted pressure the rebel forces quickly splintered and began to surrender, Sandile himself fled down into the valley of the Fish River where he was intercepted by a Fengu commando. In the final shoot out he was accidentally killed by a stray bullet. The surviving rebels were granted an amnesty.

=== Conclusion ===
The war had lasted a year and was a final blow for the last independent Xhosa state, Gcalekaland, which was now administered as a British territory. Initially, however, the conflict had shown no signs of being anything more than a petty intertribal quarrel. Neither the Cape Government nor the Xhosa had desired a war. Had Frere not moved to the frontier and drawn the conflict into his Confederation scheme, it would almost definitely have remained as only a brief patch of localised ethnic strife. Once the broader conflict had been ignited, however, the result was the annexation of all remaining Xhosa territory under British control. The war also led Frere to dissolve the Cape government.

Frere next applied the same tactics to invade the Zulu Kingdom in 1879. In the Anglo-Zulu War the disastrous use of Britain's slow-moving troop columns was once again demonstrated at Isandlwana. Although Frere was recalled for misconduct in 1880, and the Confederation scheme was dropped, the new series of "Confederation Wars" was to last over the next 20 years. These wars would see the ending of all Black independence in southern Africa and eventually build up to the great Second Boer War decades later.

== See also ==
- Albany, South Africa
- Amatola Mountains
- Thomas Baines, South Africa's first official war artist, who recorded the Eighth Frontier War (1850–1853)
- Hintsa ka Khawuta
- Crimean War
- History of Cape Colony from 1806 to 1870
- Kaffir (Historical usage in southern Africa)
- Kaffraria, and British Kaffraria
- Military history of South Africa
- Sandile kaNgqika
- Category:British military personnel of the 9th Cape Frontier War

== Link ==
- List of wars
- Irregular units of the 7th Xhosa War
- Burgher Commandos of the 7th Xhosa War
- HIS 311 Lecture on Southern Africa 1800–1875
- Fifth Kaffir War 1818–1819
- Nxele, Xhosa prophet who predicted that Xhosa ancestors would rise from the dead and win the battle
