= Griffith (name) =

Name of Welsh origin

Griffith, and its Welsh form Gruffudd or Gruffydd, is a name of Welsh origin that may be used as a personal name or surname, with or without the s as in Griffiths. The name has many variations as a result of the natural evolution of the name in Welsh, as well as the translation of the name from Welsh into both Latin and English. The anglicized and Welsh forms are treated as different spellings of the same name in Wales. The name can also be associated with the Irish surname Griffin.

Anglo-Norman scribes rendered Griffidd and Gruffydd as Griffith.

== See also ==
- Griffith (surname)
- Griffiths
- Gruffudd/Gruffydd

== General references ==
- Morgan, T. J.; Morgan, Prys (1985). Welsh Surnames. Cardiff: Qualitex Printing Limited. ISBN 0-7083-0880-5.
