= John Lloyd (archdeacon of Montgomery) =

Welsh clergyman (1879–1951)

John Walter Lloyd (11 March 1879 - 9 July 1951) was a Welsh clergyman, most notably Archdeacon of Montgomery from 1944 until his death on 9 July 1951, aged 72.

Lloyd was educated at Llandovery College and St David's College, Lampeter and ordained 1903. After a curacy in Denbigh he held incumbencies at Glyntraian, Broughton, Chirk and Llansantffraid.
