= Charles Griffiths =

Charles Griffiths may refer to:

- Charles Griffiths (British Army officer) (1763–1829), British soldier
- Charles Griffiths (footballer), British football manager
- Charles Griffiths (politician) (1903–1982), Australian politician

== See also ==
- Charles Griffith (disambiguation)
