= Charles Brownlee =

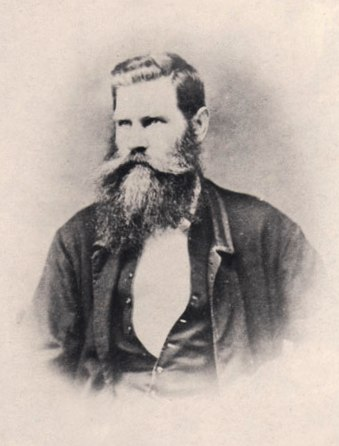
Charles Brownlee

Charles Pacalt Brownlee CMG (1821 – 13 September 1890) was a politician and writer of the Cape Colony. He was the first Secretary for Native Affairs in the Cape.

== Early life ==
Born in 1821, the son of the linguist, botanist and missionary, John Brownlee, who founded King William's Town in 1825. From his childhood, living among the Xhosa people of the Cape's eastern frontier, Charles Brownlee and his brother James grew up with mother-tongue fluency in the Xhosa language and culture. As teenagers, the brothers were employed by missionaries travelling to the Zulu Kingdom. Although Charles soon returned to the Cape, his brother was in Zululand during the Piet Retief Delegation massacre and was tasked with untangling the bodies from the still-living horses.

== Frontier work (1846-1872) ==
He was initially recorded as working as a guide to Governor Sir Harry Smith in 1846, during the frontier war. His detailed and invaluable local knowledge as well as his bravery were remarked upon, and he was soon appointed "Gaika Commissioner" in 1849 ("Gaika" was the English name at the time for the "Ngqika" branch of the Xhosa nation). He was made "Diplomatic Commissioner amongst the Gaikas" in 1851.

During the ongoing frontier wars that afflicted the vanguard of British expansion in southern Africa, Brownlee played a difficult and sometimes very awkward role as a peacemaker and cultural intermediary - sympathetic to Xhosa grievances but unable to restrain British expansion. (His unfortunate brother James Brownlee was involved in the conflict too and, in an ambush on 28 March 1851, was killed and subsequently beheaded.)

Charles Brownlee's position was done away with in 1868, when colonial policy changed, and Brownlee was re-appointed as "Civil Commissioner" for several districts of the Cape frontier, including King William's Town.

== Secretary for Native Affairs (1872-1878) ==
=== Creation of the position ===
In 1872, the Cape attained Responsible Government under the leadership of its first Prime Minister, John Molteno, and direct British rule ended.

Less interested in annexing or settling Xhosa land than the Colonial Office, the new Cape government was more concerned with ways to secure and stabilise the frontier, so that it could concentrate on internal development. In their opinion, a stable border required trust and good relations with the tribes of the neighbouring Transkei region. It also required that good relations were established with the minority of Xhosa who lived within the Cape's frontiers under traditional tribal authority - rather than under the Cape's direct laws. (The Cape had a non-racial constitution, with the multi-racial Cape Qualified Franchise system for all voters regardless of race, but many rural Xhosa remained legally subject to tribal law.)

A system of communication and understanding with these tribal authorities, who controlled much of the land on - and beyond - the Cape's eastern frontier, was thus a primary concern of the new government. So much so, that the new Prime Minister saw fit to create an entire ministry for this purpose. He also explicitly wanted a minister in his cabinet who was openly sympathetic to the Xhosa, understood their main issues and spoke their language. For this reason, he chose Charles Brownlee for this important position, later named Secretary for Native Affairs, and Brownlee gratefully resigned his Commissionership to move into government.

=== Brownlee's policies and tenure ===
For several years, Brownlee presided over the beginnings of a peace. The new government held back white expansion into Xhosa lands, while offering equal political rights to Black Africans who were citizens of the Cape. Liberals, such as the great Saul Solomon, held sway in the Cape Town parliament, and the frontier quietened and stabilised.

The lynch-pin to Brownlee's "native policy" and the primary reason for its relative success, was the legal recognition given to traditional Xhosa systems of land tenure, and the cutting of discriminatory taxation on this land. This gave protection from dispossession and abuse by white settlers, and removed one of the key grievances of the Xhosa. The policy of the government at the time was to recognise and respect the authority of the traditional Chiefs over their rural subjects, but that when Xhosa people urbanised or moved out of the tribal areas they became subject to the Cape's overall laws. Although this was intended as a compromise between forceful assimilation on the one hand and segregation on the other, it was also seen as gradually undermining the authority of traditional chiefs.

=== Imperial involvement and war ===
Beginning in the mid-1870s however, the Colonial Office became interested in more direct control of the Cape, mainly for the purpose of pushing an ill-advised plan to annex the remaining independent states in Southern Africa and to impose a system of confederation on them (similar to the Canadian Confederation. This involvement sparked conflicts across the region, culminating in the 9th Xhosa War and the First Boer War. Brownlee and the Cape government strongly opposed both the disastrous confederation scheme and the Colonial Office's expansionist policies, leading to a political collision between the Cape Government and the British imperial government based in London.

Imperial interference in a minor tribal confrontation between the Mfengu and Gcaleka tribes on the frontier led to the tribal confrontation to contribute to the outbreak of the Ninth Xhosa War. As the Cape government struggled to prevent further imperial interference, Brownlee was sent to the Cape frontier to negotiate a settlement with the Xhosa.

The governor of the Cape, Welshman Sir Henry Bartle Frere, who had taken over control of the frontier war and was bringing in imperial troops, ordered Brownlee instead to disarm all of the Cape's Black African subjects, soldiers and auxiliaries. Brownlee strongly disagreed with this policy, as did the Cape government, but was forced to carry it out, to the fury of many in the Cape. Brownlee rapidly found himself caught between three opposing forces: the Cape government, Bartle Frere, and the Xhosa. Under immense pressure, he came under criticism from all parties for his indecisive actions and consequent mishandling of the disarmament. John Molteno expected him to stand up to Frere, Bartle Frere expected him to obey his orders without question or hesistation, and the Xhosa lost all faith in him as a reliable intermediary.

== Later life as Chief Magistrate of Griqualand East (1878-1885) ==
Brownlee lost his job in 1878, when the Colonial Office suspended the Cape's elected parliament, and assumed direct imperial control over the Cape Colony. As the resulting "confederation wars" swept the sub-continent, Brownlee fell back on the position of Chief Magistrate of Griqualand East, and held this position until his retirement in 1885.

He died on 13 September 1890.
