= Michael Griffith =

Michael Griffith may refer to:

- Michael Griffith (cricketer) (1933–2018), South African cricketer
- Michael Griffith (novelist), novelist and short-story writer
- Michael Griffith, victim of manslaughter in the 1986 Howard Beach racial incident
- Mike Griffith (cricketer) (born 1943), cricketer
- Mike Griffith (politician), Maryland state legislator
- Michael Griffith (trawler); see List of shipwrecks in 1953

== See also ==
- Michael Griffin (disambiguation)
- Michael Griffiths (disambiguation)
