= Charles Griffith =

Charles Griffith may refer to:

== Politics ==
- Charles Griffith (Australian politician) (1808–1863), Australian politician and pastoralist
- Charles Duncan Griffith (1830–1906), British colonial administrator and army officer
- Charles McDonald Griffith, Barbadian politician

== Sports ==
- Charles Griffith (Australian cricketer) (1889–1928), Australian cricketer
- Charles Griffith (judoka) (born 1963), Venezuelan judoka
- Charlie Griffith (born 1938), Barbadian cricketer

== Other ==
- Charles Griffith (priest) (1857–1934), Dean of Llandaff, 1913–1926
- Charles B. Griffith (1930–2007), American screenwriter

== See also ==
- Charles Griffiths (disambiguation)
