= Bill Pritchard (priest) =

Anglican archdeacon

Thomas William (Bill) Pritchard (4 March 1933 – 8 July 2021) was a Welsh Anglican priest; he was Archdeacon of Montgomery from 1987 to 1998. He was also the author of a number of works of local history, writing as T.W. Pritchard.

== Early life ==
Pritchard was born in 1933, the son of Arthur Pritchard, a motor mechanic, and his wife Martha (née Sandford).

== Clerical career ==
Pritchard was educated at University College of North Staffordshire, where he read history and politics. He trained for ordination at St Michael's College, Llandaff, and was ordained deacon in 1957 and priest in 1958.

He served his title at Holywell (1957-61) and Ruabon (1961-63). He was then incumbent of Pontfadog (1963-70) and Llanferres with Nercwys and Eryrys (1971-77).

He was the St Asaph Diocesan Archivist from 1976 to 1998. In 1987 he was appointed archdeacon, which he held at the same time as the incumbency of Berriew and Manafon.

The study of canon law was abolished in England by Henry VIII in 1535 and only revived, in respect of the Church of England, in 1991 by Professor Norman Doe at the University of Wales, Cardiff. In 1994 Pritchard was one of the first 12 graduates of the LLM (Canon Law) degree.

== Personal life ==
Pritchard married Jean Davies in 1961.

He died in 2021, aged 88 years. He was buried in Hawarden Cemetery. His wife Jean died earlier the same year.

== List of works ==
- The Wynns at Wynnstay (1982).
- (With Ifor Edwards) The Old Parish of Ruabon in Old Picture Postcards (1990).
- Elihu Yale: The Great Welsh American (1991).
- St Asaph Cathedral; Eglwys Gadeiriol Llanelwy (1997).
- History of St. Deiniol's Library (1999).
- Remembering Ruabon; Cofio Rhiwabon (2000).
- A History of the Old Parish of Hawarden (2002).
- Gladstone's Library: St Deiniol's – 1902-2002 (2002).
- A History of the Parish of Marchwiel (2002).
- The Making of Buckley and District (2006).
- St Winefride, Her Holy Well and the Jesuit Mission c.660-1930 (2009).
- Mold Town and Country: An Historical Account (2012).
- The Glynnes of Hawarden (2017).
