= A. J. Griffith =

Alfred John Griffith MA (1846 – 3 June 1920) was an English Congregationalist minister who had a career in Australia, remembered as an "excellent preacher, an able administrator, and an earnest student of botany and philosophy".

He was successively minister of Congregationalist churches in New South Wales: Balmain 1887–1890, Croydon 1890–1894, Waverley 1894–1901; then in Brisbane 1901–1909. He subsequently served as superintendent of home missions in Victoria for three years, promoting the denomination by giving lectures and sermons throughout the state.

== History ==
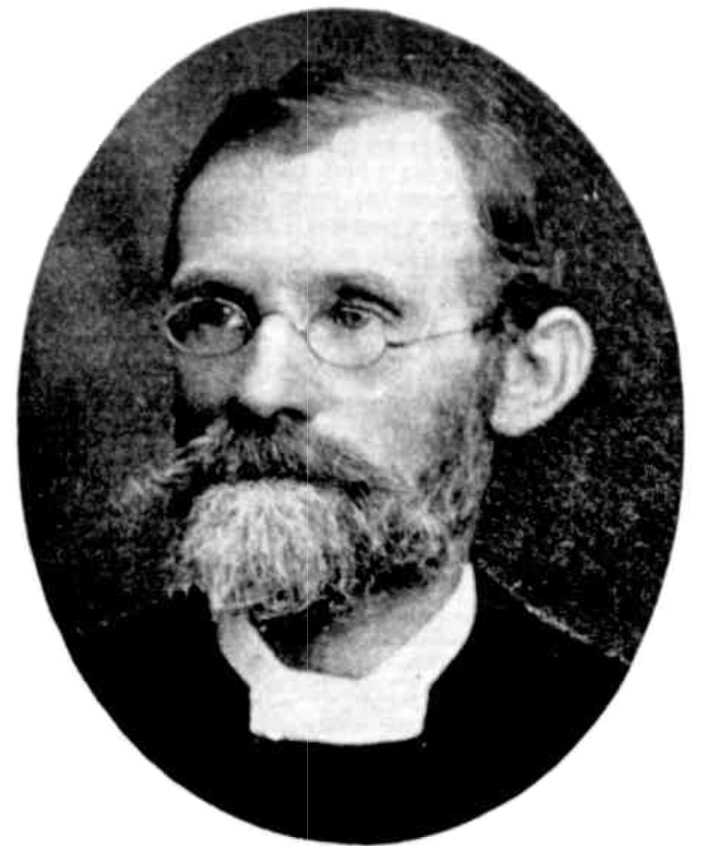
A. J. Griffith

Griffith was born in Staffordshire, a son of Rev. William Griffith, Congregationalist minister of Eastbourne, London, and educated at Silcoates School in Wakefield, Yorkshire, and Spring Hill College, Birmingham, attending Robert William Dale's church in Birmingham. He took a first-class at the Intermediate Arts Examination at London University, but did not complete the degree.

He married a fellow-parishioner from his Birmingham days sometime around 1875; they had at least three children.

He was pastor of St James' Church, Newcastle upon Tyne for several years, and his last posting in Great Britain was to the Congregationalist church at Sandown, Isle of Wight.

=== New South Wales ===
He emigrated to Sydney with his family in 1887, preaching his first sermons at Balmain Congregational Church, whose pastor, Alfred George Fry had recently accepted a call to Johnston Memorial Church, Fremantle, as successor to the eponymous Rev. Joseph Johnston., Griffith was subsequently accepted.

He was elected president of the New South Wales Auxiliary to the London Missionary Society in 1891 when the revised constitution was adopted, and elected secretary at its first Annual General Meeting.

He was admitted as a personal member of the Congregational Union of New South Wales in 1893, in 1898 succeeded F. Binns as chairman of the Union, and elected secretary in 1901.

Around 1893, while appointed to the Croydon church, he served as temporary replacement for the incapacitated Rev. J. R. Wolstenholme (Note: Wolstenholme, who was an old friend of Griffith, died in May 1894.) of the church on Brighton Road, South Brisbane, Queensland, with "much acceptance", and was offered that pulpit as a permanent position, but the congregation of the prestigious Waverley, New South Wales, church also bid for his services and was successful. He took charge of the Waverley church in 1895, and completed his degree at Sydney University, taking his M.A. in 1896.

While pastor of the Waverley Congregational Church, he was also editor of the Congregational newspaper The Australasian Independent.

In 1898 he was appointed chairman of the Congregational Union of New South Wales, and in that role was delegate to International Congregational Council held in 1899 at Boston, USA. J. Marshall Brown took his secretarial duties 1899–1900 while Griffith was in England and America.

=== Queensland ===
In 1901 the Brighton Road church again issued an invitation and this time accepted. Of necessity, he relinquished his posts as secretary of the New South Wales Auxiliary to the London Missionary Society, and the Congregational Union of New South Wales.

In 1901 he was appointed secretary of the (federal) Congregational Union of Australia, and as such was delegate to the 1908 International Congregational Council in Edinburgh, Scotland.

He was also active in the Council of Churches in Queensland, a body which brought together leaders of the various Protestant denominations to influence Parliament on questions of morality and social values. He served as its president in the year 1904–05.

He took leave to visit England and America in 1907–1908 and regretfully resigned in 1909 to take the position of superintendent of the Congregational Home Missions in Victoria. His replacement was Rev. W. S. Gunson. (Note: Not found elsewhere – perhaps a typo for W. N. Gunson)

=== Victoria ===
From October 1909 he was superintendent of Home Missions in Victoria, a position requiring a great deal of travelling throughout the state.

He was superintendent of the Congregational Union of Victoria.

He was conference secretary for the triennial Congregational conference held in Hobart in 1910, marred by the recent death of the well-known Rev. J. J. Halley.

He resigned the Home Mission appointment in 1912, but continued to act as secretary to the Congregational Union of Australia.

=== Return to New South Wales ===
He retired to his home at Lakemba, where in 1913 his wife died; he subsequently accepted a call to the Congregational Church of Lakemba–Campsie.

He continued to act as secretary of the Congregational Union of Australia but from 1916, following a serious illness, was largely ineffective and was succeeded in 1919 by Absalom Deans, who held the post for 22 years.

In June 1920 he left Sydney for Melbourne, to stay with his son, Rev. J. S. Griffith, and shortly died of a heart attack. His remains were cremated.

== Publication ==
Griffith was the author of Studia Crucis – Sermons on the Crucifixion and related themes.

== Family ==
He married Emily Frances Tell Jones (died 11 or 12 July 1913), who had also been a member of Rev. Dale's Church in Birmingham. Their children include

- Rev. J. Shaw Griffith. M.A. (10 May 1876 – 10 May 1939) (Note: James Shaw Griffith was born in Newcastle upon Tyne, educated in Brisbane and Sydney University before taking his MA at Balliol College, Oxford. He was pastor of Halstead, England, and Abingdon on Thames, in 1907 taking the Union Church, Tientsin, East China, then returned to Australia as minister of Elsternwick Congregational Church. From 1919 he was principal of the Congregational College of Victoria, Melbourne.)
- May Griffith married Herbert John Renwick on 18 December 1901; he was the second son of Sir Arthur Renwick.
- Bernard Griffith ( – ) married Irene Davies on 2 November 1912. She was a daughter of Rev. J. T. Warlow Davies, M.A.

A brother was Congregational minister of Bishopsgate chapel and Fetter Lane church, London.
