= Ramkraal Prison =

- Interactive map of the Ramkraal Prison area
- Alternative names: Old Prison – Bloemfontein

General information
- Type: Fort and Prison
- Architectural style: Victorian
- Classification: Historical building
- Location: Bloemfontein, Free State, South Africa
- Coordinates: 29°07′37″S 26°13′46″E
- Construction started: 1893
- Completed: 1895
- Cost: £16,000
- Owner: Free State Government, South Africa

Height
- Height: Interior: 55 m; Entrance foyer: 8.5 m
- Roof: Wooden trusses with corrugated iron sheeting

Technical details
- Material: Sandstone (walls 300–500 mm thick)
- Floor count: 1

Design and construction
- Designations: Declared National Monument, 13 July 1990 (Gazette No. 12608)
- Known for: Historical colonial-era prison; gallows; National Monument designation

Ramkraal was a prison in Bloemfontein which was built as a response to the growing crime rate after the introduction of the railway line. This prison was built in 1893 and continued to be used until the end of apartheid.

== Beginning ==
During the late 1800s, when the railway lines reached Bloemfontein, there was a high influx into the town. The town was expanding and with it came an increase in criminal activity. At this time, crime increased by about 66%. Most prosecutions were in line with pass laws, theft, drunkenness, and disturbance of peace and the forgery of alcohol slips. At the time, Bloemfontein housed a prison on St George Street and due to the increased criminal activity, needed a new one.

In 1829, this prison housed 70 criminals (black and white) with 8 cells, two of which were for whites and one for women. This increase even caused the District physician – Dr J Kraise – to request an increase in salary as more than half of the prison population required his services. In 1878, Dr Krause compiled a report to the Volksraad (The parliament of the former Free State Republic, which existed from 1857 to 1902, which ceased to exist after the British victory in the South African War); stressing the inhumane living conditions at the prison. He termed these conditions “a screaming injustice”. The cells were overcrowded with no source of light and/or ventilation. It was also reported that there were a lot of rats and mice in those cells. This prison was also used as a makeshift hospital and this received a huge outcry from the community. De Tijd newspaper reported that the prison was “almost too bad for a negro to live in”.

== Establishment of Ramkraal Prison ==
The construction of the new prison began in 1893 and the cost of the building amounted to £16 000. Initially, prosecutions in Bloemfontein were performed on an open space; although they were eventually moved to a place away from the city centre. With the completion of Ramkraal prison, the gallows were then moved there and they were near the circular wall enclosure. The gallows were described as “…immense, sturdy and square, erected with thick black beams and ironwork with 22 steps leading to a platform halfway to the top. Then there is the cloak of black material covering the body of the sentenced in which he or she was dressed prior to the hanging. Further up the framework was the cross-beam from which the rope hung”.

The treatment of the prisoners was still dire and although the conditions had improved from the previous prison, they were still unfavourable living conditions. Corporal punishment was still freely applied – at least to black prisoners because the Magistrate declared that he "did not like a white man to be flogged". The scourging area at the new prison was used regularly, where the black prisoners would be whipped, as punishment. All prisoners still had to wear foot shackles (often causing painful chafing) with which they had to sleep as well. Mixed working groups with black and white prisoners with a white or black supervisor were a common sight in the town.

Authorities decided to keep prisoners in chains so that they would not escape as they went to work in town. The supervisors were asked to lead their groups around the outskirts of the town to their working areas rather than through the streets. This was so much so that there would be no mingling with the community which they feared would cause the prisoners to escape.

== Architecture ==
The building was completed in 1895. The following are its architectural character:

- Ring wall with two watchtowers and symmetrical design
- Entrance foyer had a height of 8.5m but was well provided with sunlight due to large window openings
- Interior height was 55m
- Prison cells were 3.5m x 2m
- Corridors were 3m
- Building was made of sandstone and the wall thickness varied from 300mm to 500mm
- Roof was constructed with wooden trusses and corrugates iron sheeting.

== Declaration status ==
Ramkraal Prison was registered on 13 July 1990 under the National Monuments Council. Details of its heritage status are as follows:

- Province: Free State
- Magisterial District: Mangaung Metro
- Gazette Number: 12608
- Gazette Date: 1990-07-13 00:00:00
- Gazette Description(Short: The old Gaol, situated on Erf 1913, in the City of Bloemfontein, District of Bloemfontein. Deed of Transfer 19641/1907, dated 23 February 1907.
- Gazette Description(Long: No. 1582 13 July 1990 NATIONAL MONUMENTS ACT, No. 28 OF 1969 REGISTERING OF CONSERVATION - WORTHY IMMOVABLE PROPERTY In terms of section 5 (1)(cC)of the National Monuments Act, 1969 (Act No.28 of 1969), the National Monuments Council hereby makes an entry in the official register of the immovable property fully described in the Schedule hereto, which the Council regards as worthy of conservation on the ground of its historical, cultural or aesthetic interest.
- SCHEDULE: The old Gaol, situated on Erf 1913, in the City of Bloemfontein, District of Bloemfontein.
- Deed of Transfer: 19641/1907, dated 23 February 1907.
- Deeds Number 19641/1907

== Current status ==
Currently, the building has not been well maintained as a heritage site under the protection of the National Heritage Resources Act no 25 of 1999. In 2012, the prison had been occupied by homeless people. The Free State government then proposed to build a new legislature and turn the prison into a museum. People who had been illegally residing in the prison were moved.

== See also ==
- Bloemfontein
