= Fort White, Eastern Cape =

Fort in South Africa used by the British army as a base during the Xhosa Wars

Fort White
- Eastern Cape; Near King William's Town in South Africa

Site information
- Type: Fort

Location
- Location in the Eastern Cape
- Coordinates: 32.835496°S 27.118932°E

Fort White was established in 1835 as a base for the British army during the Xhosa Wars. It is the Eastern Cape province of South Africa, near King William's Town. It was named after Major TC White, Assistant Quarter-Master General of the Burgher Force and military land-surveyor and topographer, who was killed near the Mbashe River.

== See also ==
- List of Castles and Fortifications in South Africa
- Ramkraal Prison
