= Charles Duncan Griffith =

British colonial administrator and army officer

Colonel Charles Duncan Griffith CMG

Member of the Cape Colony Legislative Assembly
- Monarch: Queen Victoria
- Constituency: Thembuland

Governor's Agent and Chief Magistrate of Basutoland
- Incumbent
- Assumed office 1871
- Prime Minister: Sir John Gordon Sprigg
- Governor: Sir Henry Barkly (1870–1877); Henry Bartle Frere (1877–1880)

Personal details
- Born: 5 September 1830 Grahamstown, Eastern Cape
- Died: 17 October 1906 (aged 76) London
- Spouse: Dorothea Mounsey Gilfillan (m. 1856–1898)
- Children: 12
- Parents: Charles Griffith (father); Maria Steyne (mother)

Military service
- Allegiance: Cape Colony
- Rank: Colonel
- Battles/wars: Morosi's Mountain 1879

Colonel Charles Duncan Griffith CMG (5 September 1830 – 17 October 1906) was a British colonial administrator and army officer.

The career of Griffith has been a varied and interesting one, having fought for, and served his country with distinction in a variety of capacities. His father, a captain of the Royal Marines, landed on the shores of the Cape in 1818. Twelve years later Griffith was born at Grahamstown. He was educated there and at Cape Town; his father introduced merino sheep into the Cape Colony.

Colonel Griffith next featured as a fighter in the 1840s; he fought in all the Kaffir Wars of the period. He was a lieutenant in the Hottentot Levy, also in the Kaffir Police; and was a captain commanding the former in the Kaffir War of 1851–52. For his services he was awarded the medal, and repeatedly commended in General Orders. He was appointed Civil Commissioner and Resident Magistrate of Albert in 1858, and was subsequently promoted to the districts of Queenstown, Grahamstown, and Albany. By special request of Sir Philip Wodehouse, he was transferred in 1869 to the important division of King William’s Town.

In 1871 he was Governor’s Agent and Chief Magistrate of British Basutoland. Six years later he was again in the “tented field” commanding the Frontier Armed Mounted Police Force. He quelled, in that year, the outbreak of the Galeka and Gaika tribes, at which period he ranked in the Transkei Command as a colonel in His Majesty’s Army, and was commander-in-chief of the Imperial and Colonial Troops on the eastern side of the Kei River.

Later he was made Commandant-General of the whole of the Colonial Forces of the colony, and soon afterwards received the cordial thanks of both Houses of Parliament for the great services he had rendered the country.

In the field of politics he has not been less successful, as was evidenced in 1888 when he contested the Tembuland and defeated a strong opponent. At the general election of the same year he was returned unopposed for the same seat.

Griffith returned to England after his service in the Cape and resided at 30, St. James’ Road, Southernwood, East London, he married Dorothea Mounsey Gilfillan, the daughter of 1820 Settler, Lieutenant William Frederick Anderson Gilfillan, C.C., of the Cradock District.

Sir Henry Barkly was appointed High Commissioner of the Cape Colony on 31 December 1871. He annexed Basutoland and Charles Griffith was appointed Chief Magistrate and Governor's Agent.
