= Frederick Griffith (disambiguation) =

Frederick Griffith (c.1879–1941) was a British bacteriologist.

Frederick Griffith may also refer to:

- Frederick W. Griffith (1858–1928), New York politician
- Fred Griffith (actor) (born 1964), American actor
- Fred Griffith (TV personality) (1929–2019), American television personality (The Morning Exchange)
