= John Griffith (monk) =

Personal life
- Era: 16th century
- Education: St John's College, Oxford
- Known for: Preaching in English and Latin
- Other name: John Griffin

Religious life
- Religion: Roman Catholic
- Order: Cistercian
- Church: Halesowen Abbey

John Griffith or Griffin (fl. 1553) was a Welsh præmonstratensian and a monk of the order of Cistercians in Halesowen Abbey, Worcestershire.

== Life ==
He was educated at Oxford in the Cistercian college of St. Bernard, now St John's College, Oxford, but what degree he took is uncertain. According to Anthony Wood he was sympathetic to the reformers, but later remained a Roman Catholic.

He preached eloquently in English and in Latin. The time of his death and his place of burial are both uncertain, as he had been expelled from his monastery several years before the dissolution of the monasteries; but he was still living in the reign of Edward VI, and perhaps in that of Mary I.

== Works ==
He wrote in Latin ‘Conciones Æstivales’ (‘modicum etiam non videbitis mel’), and ‘Conciones Hyemales’ (‘cum appropinquasset Iesus lerosolymam’).
