= USS John Griffith =

Mortar schooner acquired by the Union Navy

History

United States
- Acquired: 16 September 1861
- Commissioned: 20 January 1862
- Decommissioned: 1 June 1864
- In service: 23 August 1864
- Out of service: 21 August 1865
- Fate: Sold, 8 September 1865

General characteristics
- Displacement: 240 tons
- Length: 113 ft 8 in (34.65 m)
- Beam: 8 ft 4 in (2.54 m)
- Propulsion: sail
- Complement: 39
- Armament: 1 × 13 in (330 mm) mortar; 2 × 32-pounder guns; 2 × 12-pounder howitzers

USS John Griffith was a mortar schooner acquired by the Union Navy during the American Civil War. She was used for various purposes, but especially for bombardment because of her large 13-inch mortar and 12-pounder howitzers that could fire up and over tall defensive riverbanks.

== Service history ==
John Griffith was purchased by the Navy at New York City from B. P. Woolsey 16 September 1861; and commissioned at New York Navy Yard 20 January 1862, Lt. K. Randolph Breese in command. The schooner was ordered to Key West, Florida, to join the Mortar Flotilla being organized by Comdr. David D. Porter for the decisive attack up the Mississippi River. The flotilla sailed from Key West on 6 March and on 11 March anchored at Ship Island, Mississippi, the staging area for Flag Officer David Farragut's New Orleans, Louisiana, campaign. A week later John Griffith was towed across the bar at Pass a l'Outre with Porter's other mortar schooners. For the next month, while Farragut labored to move his deep-draft, sea-going ships across the bar and into the Mississippi, Porter's vessels drilled and prepared for the fight awaiting them.

The mortar boats moved into terminal position 18 April and opened fire on Fort Jackson and Fort St. Philip. John Griffith, now under Acting Master Henry Brown, was in the 3rd Division commanded by her old skipper, Lt. Breese, who placed his schooners along the western bank of the river just below the lower limit of Fort Jackson's fire. John Griffith pressed the attack with great vigor, leading the ships of her division on 4 days of the weeklong bombardment which continued until Farragut had succeeded in fighting his mighty fleet past the forts to capture New Orleans in one of the war's most daring and strategically significant operations. This bold stroke deprived the South of her largest and wealthiest city, tightened the Union blockade, and gave promise of restoring the entire Mississippi Valley to the Union. When he was barely beyond the forts, Farragut paused to bury his dead, repair his ships, and dash off a note of thanks to Porter for the help of the mortars: "You supported us most nobly."

John Griffith's next major operation came on Farragut's second passage up the Mississippi River. The mortars rained their 8-inch shells on the Confederate batteries at Vicksburg, Mississippi, while the heavy ships steamed by the forts to meet Flag Officer Davis and his Mississippi Flotilla. The schooners then waited for Farragut below Vicksburg, occasionally enlivening their vigil by hurling a few shells at the forts. On 15 July they resumed the bombardment in earnest when the sound of heavy firing announced Farragut's approach.

John Griffith continued to serve the West Gulf Blockading Squadron until ordered north 18 May 1864. The schooner decommissioned for repairs 1 June and she re-commissioned 23 August 1864. The following day she received orders to sail to Port Royal, South Carolina, for service in the South Atlantic Blockading Squadron. She arrived at Port Royal 8 September and served on blockade duty and at the mouth of the Altamaha River, Georgia, until ordered 12 December to the Savannah River, where General William Tecumseh Sherman had just emerged at the end of his famous march to the sea. Five days later John Griffith shelled Fort Beaulieu, the Confederate fortress defending the mouths of the Vernon and Burnside Rivers. With USS Sonoma (1862) she maintained her steady and deliberate fire until the defenders finally evacuated 21 December. Thereafter John Griffith remained on blockade duty until after the end of the war. She decommissioned 21 August 1865 and was sold at public auction at Boston Navy Yard to C. Foster 8 September 1865.
