= David Griffith (priest) =

Welsh Anglican priest (1936–2024)

David Vaughan Griffith (14 June 1936 – 1 December 2024) was a Welsh Anglican priest who was Archdeacon of Montgomery from 1998 to 2002.

== Early life ==
Griffith was born in 1936 in Caernarvon. His older brother John (1933–2022) was also a clergyman.

== Clerical career ==
Griffith was educated at St David's College, Lampeter. He was ordained deacon in 1962 and priest in 1963.

He served his title at Llanfairfechan (1962–66) and Dolgellau (1966–70). He was then incumbent of Llanfair Talhaiarn (1970–82), Llanfairtalhaiarn and Llansannan (1982–85) and Llandewi (1977–85), and Colwyn (1985–98). In 1998 he was appointed archdeacon, which he held at the same time as the incumbency of Berriew and Manafon; he was also Prebendary of St Asaph Cathedral. Overlapping these appointments, from 1991 to 1999 he was St Asaph Diocesan Warden of Readers.

== Personal life and death ==
Griffith married Patricia Jones in 1966. He died on 1 December 2024, aged 88. His wife Pat survived him. His funeral took place at St Asaph Cathedral.
