= Gruffudd =

Gruffudd or Gruffydd (Welsh pronunciation: [ˈɡrɨ̞fɨ̞ð] or [ˈɡrɪfɪð], in either case) is a Welsh name, originating in Old Welsh as a given name and today used as both a given and a surname. It is the origin of the Anglicised name Griffith[s], and was historically sometimes treated as interchangeable with the etymologically unrelated Germanic name Galfrid (Latinised as Galfridus). The Welsh form evolved from the Common Brittonic Grippiud or Gripuid. The meaning of the name is “strong lord.”

== Evolution and history ==
One of the oldest forms which gave rise to all other variations is Grippiud or Gripuid, which evolved into Old Welsh Griffudd. The second element of the name, iudd, as a noun has a meaning of 'lord' and is found in other Welsh names such as Meredith (Mared[i]udd) and Bleidd[i]udd. In North Wales Griffudd evolved into Gruffudd. “When u came to have the same quality as the clear y (the y of monosyllables and final syllables) the name generally became Gruffydd, and this is now regarded as the standard form,” according to T.J. Morgan and Prys Morgan. Gruffudd of Old Welsh became spelt as Gruffydd in Middle Welsh and Modern Welsh of today. The high central vowel sound of u/y was lost entirely in South Wales and replaced by the i sound, and the form Griffidd became standard in the south, the region to first be encountered by Anglo-Norman scribes.

== Variations ==
Anglo-Norman scribes rendered Griffidd and Gruffydd as Griffith, with both Gruffydd and Griffith becoming the standardized forms for the same name since the High Middle Ages and into the modern era. The form of the name encountered in Latin texts is Griffith, Griffini and Gruffin.

Many variations have evolved since the Middle Ages and Tudor period, with many springing from abbreviated forms such as Griff.

Griffri, Griffith, Griffyn, Griffei, Griffies, Griffitte, Griffits, Griffitts, Griffes, Griffyths, Gripthis, Gripphes, Griffithi, Griffen, Griffee, Griffey, Gruffudd, Gruffydd

Patronymics evolving from Griffith include Griffiths and Griffyths, son of Griffith.

== Hypocoristic forms ==
Hypocoristic forms, or “pet names”, included Guto, Gutyn, Gitto, Getyn, Gitton, and Gutta, with many of these becoming surnames themselves. Derivations of Gruffydd by way of Guto/Gitto include Gittos, Gittose, Gittoss, Gittas, Gyttes, Gitts, Gytts, Gittus, Gitthouse, Gyttors, Gittonce, Gittal, Gittall, Gyttall, Gittall, Gethyn.

The name Gatehouse may have originated in some parts of Wales and the March from Gittose or a variant as a conscious effort to further anglicize the name.

== Names ==
The name may refer to the following people, often with either spelling used, among other variants such as Gruffuth, Griffudd, etc.:

=== As a given name ===
- Gruffudd ab Adda (fl. mid 14th century) was a Welsh language poet and musician
- Gruffudd ab Owain Glyndŵr (c. 1375 – c. 1412) led a major revolt in Wales
- Gruffudd ab yr Ynad Coch (1277–1282), Welsh court poet
- Gruffudd ap Cynan
- Gruffudd ap Cynan ab Owain Gwynedd, the grandson of the king of Gwynedd
- Gruffudd Fychan I
- Gruffudd Fychan II
- Gruffudd Gryg (1340–1380), Welsh poet from Anglesey, North Wales
- Gruffydd ap Gwenwynwyn
- Gruffudd Hiraethog (died 1564), Welsh language poet
- Gruffudd ap Llywelyn
- Gruffudd ap Llywelyn Fawr (c. 1198 – March 1, 1244), son of Llywelyn the Great
- Gruffudd Llwyd (1380–1410), Welsh language poet
- Gruffydd ap Madog Fychan
- Gruffydd Maelor (died 1191)
- Gruffudd Maelor (died 1269)
- Gruffudd ap Nicolas
- Gruffydd Robert, Welsh priest
- Gruffydd ap Rhydderch
- Gruffydd ap Rhys
- Gruffydd ap Rhys II
- Gruffudd Vychan, (born 1395), Lord of Burgedin, Treflydan, Garth and Gearfawr, Wales

=== As a surname or patronymic ===
- Ioan Gruffudd (born 1973), Welsh actor
- Rhodri ap Gruffudd (1230–1315), the third or fourth son of Gruffydd ap Llywelyn Fawr

== See also ==
- Galfrid
- Griffith (name)
- Griffith (surname)
- Griffiths
