= Peter Pike (priest) =

Peter John Pike (b 1953) is a retired Anglican priest: he was Archdeacon of Montgomery, 2012–2018)

Pike was educated at the University of Southampton and ordained 1985. After a curacy in Broughton he held incumbencies at Woodplumpton, Briercliffe, Bempton and Berriew.
