= Michael Griffin =

Mike or Michael Griffin may refer to:

== Public officials ==
- Michael Griffin (Wisconsin politician) (1842–1899), Irish-born American congressman
- Michael D. Griffin (born 1949), American physicist, NASA administrator and Under Secretary of Defense
- Michael Griffin (Indiana politician), American state senator in 2022

== Sportsmen ==
- Mike Griffin (outfielder) (1865–1908), American baseball manager for Brooklyn Bridegrooms
- Michael Griffin (footballer) (1886–1923), English striker
- Mike Griffin (basketball) (born 1943), American coach at Rensselaer Polytechnic Institute
- Mike Griffin (pitcher) (born 1957), American pitching coach for Norfolk Tides
- Michael Griffin (American football) (born 1985), safety for NFL Tennessee Titans
- Michael Griffin II (born 1998), American gridiron football defensive back

== Others ==
- Michael Griffin (Irish priest) (1892–1920), victim of fatal shooting during Irish War of Independence
- Michael Griffin (surgeon) (born 1955), British clinical researcher in early cancer diagnosis
- Michael Griffin (escape artist) (born 1961), American magician and illusionist
- Michael F. Griffin (born 1962), American convicted for Murder of David Gunn
