= Ellis Griffith (priest) =

Welsh clergyman (died 1938)

Ellis Hughes Griffith, MBE was a Welsh clergyman, most notably the Archdeacon of Montgomery from 1925 until his death on 6 February 1938, aged 71.

Griffith was educated at St David's College, Lampeter and ordained 1896. After curacies in Llandyfrydog and Carnarvon he held incumbencies at Llangadwaladr and Welshpool.
