= Griffin (disambiguation) =

A griffin is a mythical creature, with the body of a lion and head and wings of an eagle.

Griffin(s) or The Griffin(s) may also refer to:

== Arts and entertainment ==
=== Fictional characters ===
- Griffin (The Invisible Man), the title character in H. G. Wells' novel
- Griffin (DC Comics), a character in the DC Comics universe
- Griffin (Marvel Comics), a character in the Marvel Comics universe
- Griffin, in the Australian-New Zealand film The Navigator: A Medieval Odyssey
- Griffin Callenreese, in the Japanese manga and anime series Banana Fish
- Griffin Castillo, in the American television soap opera All My Children
- Griffin Pierce-Taylor, in the Canadian television series Degrassi: The Next Generation
- Griffin Turner, a character in Ninjago
- Griffin Moss, one of the main characters of The Griffin and Sabine Saga
- Griffin, also known as the Invisible Man, is one of the main characters in the Hotel Transylvania film series
- Griffin emblem of Midland Bank, later used as a character in advertisements for the bank
- Griffin Spade player character of BattleTanx and Battletanx: Global Assault

=== Other uses in arts and entertainment ===
- Griffin Poetry Prize, a Canadian poetry award
- "The Griffin" (fairy tale), a German fairy tale collected by the Brothers Grimm
- The Griffin, the undergraduate student magazine of Downing College, Cambridge, England
- The Griffin, the annual literary journal of Gwynedd Mercy University, Pennsylvania, U.S.
- Griffin Theatre Company, in Sydney, Australia

== Businesses and organisations ==
=== Education ===
- Griffin College, in Seattle, Washington, U.S., 1909–1993
- Griffin Elementary School, in Lakeland, Florida, U.S.
- Griffin High School (Georgia), U.S.
- Griffin School District, Washington, U.S.
- Griffin Technical College, Griffin, Georgia, U.S.

=== Other businesses and organisations ===
- Griffin (bank), a British bank based in London, England
- Griffin Communications, an American media company
- Griffin Hospital, Derby, Connecticut, U.S.
- Griffin Investigations, an American private investigation firm
- Griffin Music, a Canadian independent record label
- Griffin's Foods, a New Zealand-based food company

== Hotels and public houses ==
- The Griffin, Bowdon, a pub in Greater Manchester, England
- The Griffin, Monmouth, a former pub in Wales
- Griffin Hotel, Attleborough, a hotel in Norfolk, England
- Griffin Hotel, Wigan, a former pub in Greater Manchester
- The Griffins Hotel, a hotel in Adelaide, South Australia

== Military ==
- Heinkel He 177 Greif (German, 'griffin'), a World War II German heavy bomber
- Bell Griffin, a helicopter
- Saab JAS 39 Gripen ('Griffin'), a Swedish fighter aircraft
- AGM-176 Griffin, a precision-guided munition by Raytheon
- No. 9 Squadron (Pakistan Air Force), named The Griffins
- Griffin LGB, an Israeli laser guided bomb system
- General Dynamics Griffin, a variant of the ASCOD armoured fighting vehicle

== People ==
- Larry Griffin, 1995 executed murderer
- Griffin (given name), including a list of people with the name
- Griffin (surname), including a list of people and fictional characters with the name
- House of Griffin or Griffin dynasty, a dynasty ruling the Duchy of Pomerania from the 12th century until 1637

== Places ==
=== Canada ===
- Rural Municipality of Griffin No. 66, Saskatchewan
  - Griffin, Saskatchewan
- Griffin Inlet, Nunavut

=== United States ===
- Griffin Township, Pope County, Arkansas
- Griffin, Georgia
- Griffin, Illinois
- Griffin, Indiana
- Griffin, Missouri
- Griffin Bay State Park, Washington
- Griffin Island, a mountain in Massachusetts
- Fort Griffin, Texas
- Lake Griffin State Park, Florida

=== Other countries ===
- Griffin, Queensland, a suburb in the Moreton Bay Region, Australia
- Griffin Cove, South Shetland Islands, Antarctica
- Griffin Nunatak, Oates Land, Antarctica
- Mount Griffin, Victoria Land, Antarctica
- 4995 Griffin, an asteroid

== Ships ==
- Griffin (ship), a 17th-century English sailing ship in British America
- Griffin (1807 ship), a prize that made one voyage as a whaler
- Gribshunden or Griffen ('Griffin'), a 15th-century Danish warship
- HMS Griffin, several ships of the Royal Navy
- Hired armed cutter Griffin, two Royal Navy vessels
- Le Griffon ('The Griffin'), a 17th-century French ship
- USS Griffin, a U.S. Navy submarine tender during World War II

== Sports ==
- Grand Rapids Griffins, an American hockey team
- Griffin (esports), a South Korean professional esports team
- Griffin (mascot), the College of William & Mary's official mascot
- Griffin, the mascot of Grossmont College, California, U.S.
- Kotka Griffins, a Finnish rugby union team

== Other uses ==
- Griffin moon lander, constructed by Astrobotic
- Griffin beaker, a "low-form" glass beaker
- Griffin (processor), an AMD microprocessor
- Project Griffin, a counter-terrorism project

== See also ==
- Griff (disambiguation)
- Griffen
- Griffin Creek (disambiguation)
- Griffin House (disambiguation)
- Griffin Inn (disambiguation)
- Griffin Stadium (disambiguation)
- Griffon (disambiguation)
- Gryffin, stage name of American musician Dan Griffith
- Gryphon (disambiguation)
- Justice Griffin (disambiguation)
