= Griffon =

Griffon may refer to:

- Griffin, or griffon, a mythical creature, with the body of a lion and head and wings of an eagle

== Businesses ==
- Griffon Aerospace, an American aerospace and defense company
- Griffon Corporation, a multinational conglomerate holding company
- Griffon Hoverwork, a British hovercraft designer and manufacturer

== Species ==
- Griffon (dog type), a collection of breeds that were originally hunting dogs
- The griffons, several birds of prey in the genus Gyps

== Transportation and military ==
- Bell CH-146 Griffon, a helicopter
- HMS Griffon, the name of several ships of the Royal Navy
- InterPlane Griffon, an ultralight aircraft
- Le Griffon, a 1679 French sailing vessel
- Nord 1500 Griffon a 1950s experimental fighter aircraft
- Rolls-Royce Griffon, a British aero engine
- CCGS Griffon, a Canadian Coast Guard vessel
- HMCS Griffon, Canadian Forces shore establishment
- VBMR Griffon, a French multi-role armored vehicle

== Other uses ==
- Griffon (framework), an open source rich client platform framework
- Griffon (roller coaster), in Busch Gardens Williamsburg, U.S.
- Griffons (rugby union), a South African rugby union team
- Missouri Western Griffons, sports teams of Missouri Western State University, U.S.
- Griffon Ramsey (born 1980), an American chainsaw carving artist
- Griffon (Devil May Cry), a demon in the video game series Devil May Cry

== See also ==
- Griffen
- Griffin (disambiguation)
- Gryphon (disambiguation)
