= Gryphon (disambiguation) =

A gryphon, or griffin, is a mythical creature, with the body of a lion and head and wings of an eagle.

Gryphon may also refer to:

== Arts, entertainment and media ==
- Gryphon (band), a British progressive rock band, and their self-titled 1973 album
- Gryphon (film), a 2007 TV film
- Gryphon Trio, a Canadian classical piano trio
- Gryphon, a 1990 installment of the TV anthology series WonderWorks
- Gryphon (Alice's Adventures in Wonderland), a fictional character
- The Gryphon, formerly Leeds Student, a British weekly student newspaper
- The Gryphon (TV series), a 2023 German TV Series

== Businesses and organisations ==
- Gryphon Airlines, an American airline
- Gryphon Audio Designs, a Danish maker of audio equipment
- Gryphon Publications, an American independent publishing company
- The Gryphon School, in Sherborne, Dorset, England

== Other uses ==
- Gryphon (geology), a mud volcano
- Gryphon (parachute system), a military parachute system
- BGM-109G Ground Launched Cruise Missile, or Gryphon, an American cruise missile
- 6136 Gryphon, an asteroid

== See also ==
- Griffin (disambiguation)
- Griffon (disambiguation)
- Gryphon Software
