= Griffin Creek =

Griffin Creek may refer to:

- Griffin Creek (Alberta), a stream in Alberta
- Griffin Creek (Flathead County, Montana), a stream in Montana
- Griffin Creek (Bear Creek tributary), a stream in Oregon
