= Miller-Melone Ranch =

Historic house in California, United States

- U.S. National Register of Historic Places
- Charles Miller House
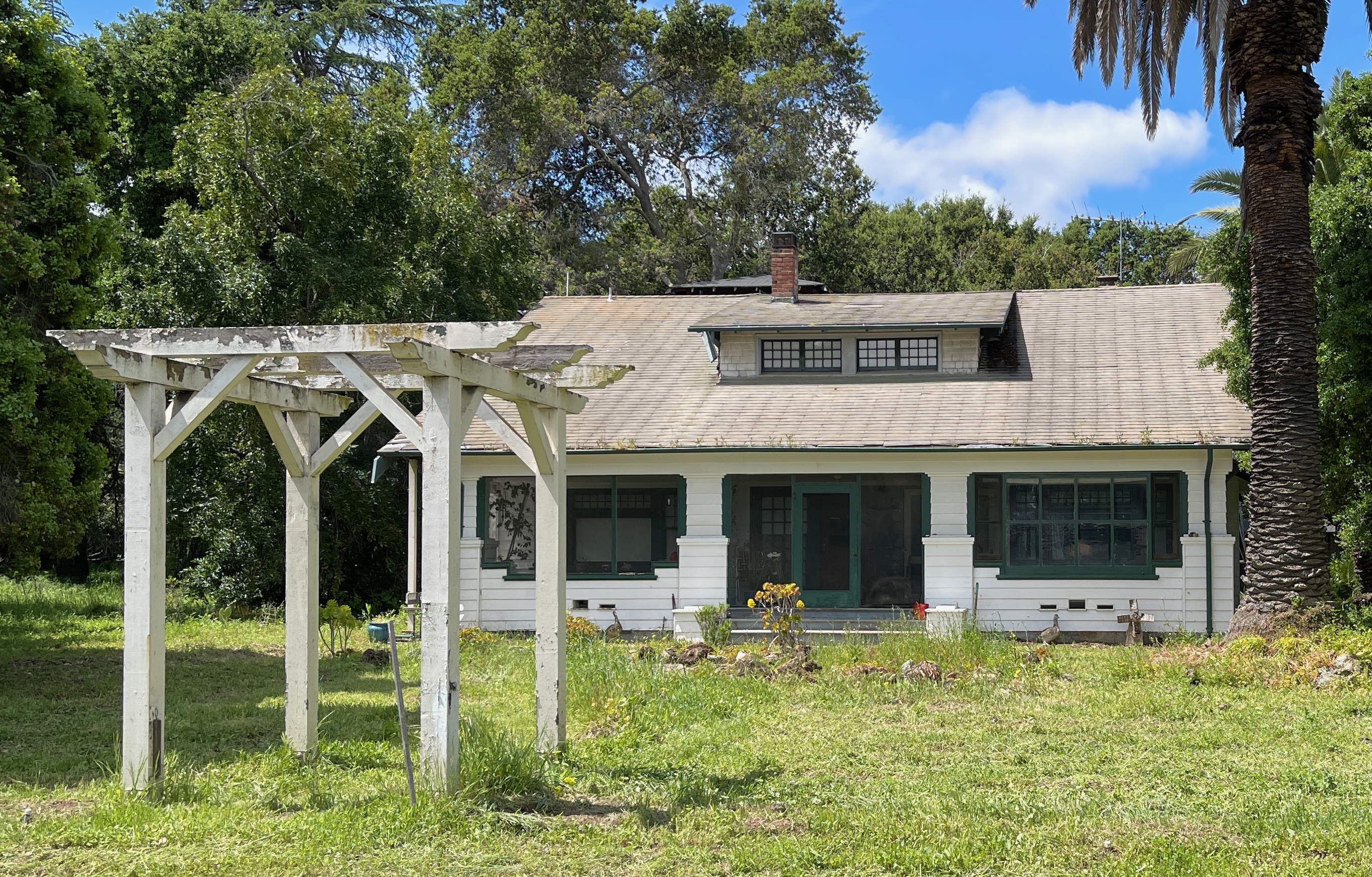
- Miller-Melone Ranch House

- Location within San Jose, California
- Location: 12795 Saratoga-Sunnyvale Road, Saratoga, California, US
- Coordinates: 37°16′57″N 122°01′58″W
- Area: 2.8 acres (1.1 ha)
- Built: 1911
- Built by: Frank Delos Wolfe
- Architect: Frank Delos Wolfe
- Architectural style: American Craftsman
- NRHP reference No.: 93000260
- Added to NRHP: April 1, 1993

Miller-Melone Ranch is a historic American Craftsman ranch-style homestead, located in Saratoga, California. The ranch house was designed and built by architect Frank Delos Wolfe in 1911 for Charles Miller and his wife Lillian Fern Melone. It is the last remaining prune ranch home in the Saratoga area. The Miller-Melone Ranch was listed in the National Register of Historic Places on April 1, 1993.

== History ==
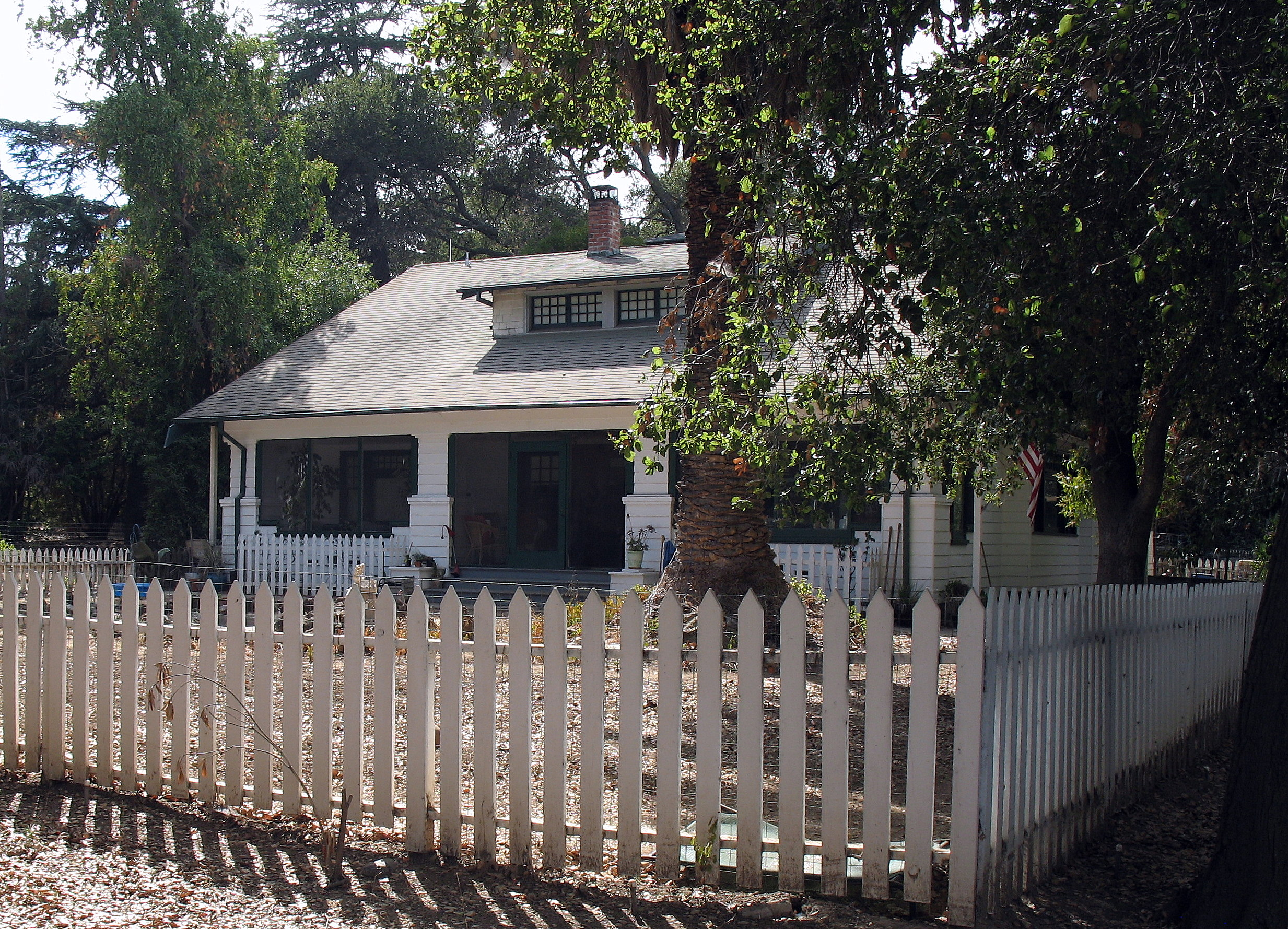
Miller-Melone Ranch House in 2012

In 1876, William Thomas Melone married Lucy A. Melone. In 1887, they moved from Illinois to Saratoga with their five children. There, they acquired several parcels of orchard land. Following Lucy Melone's death in 1905, she left land to each of her children. Lillian Fern Melone inherited 21.23 acres (8.59 ha). Lillian, who later married Charles Miller, built the Miller-Melone house on a portion of the inherited acreage.

The Miller-Melone Ranch remains the only existing prune ranch home and orchard in the Saratoga area, preserving its original outbuildings. This property includes a 200 ft (61 m) driveway off Saratoga-Sunnyvale Road, ranch house, a garage, a tank house, and a windmill. From 1911 to 1986, Charlie Miller and his family resided in the residence that served as the home for the prune orchardist. During their seventy-five years on this ranch, the Millers witnessed the latter stages of the prime era of agriculture in the Santa Clara Valley Santa Clara Valley, its subsequent decline, and the shift from a rural, crop-dependent transition to an urbanized society. Throughout their residency in the Craftsman house, the experiences of the Miller family closely mirrored many other fruit ranching families in Santa Clara County, California. From 1905 to 1986, the majority of the 21 acres were sold to various buyers, leaving only 2.8 acres (1.1 ha) remaining.

=== Design ===
The Miller-Melone Ranch has a two-bedroom, one-bath American Craftsman-style ranch house, with a garage, tank house, windmill, a non-contributing aviary, and a well-preserved cast-iron lidded fuel oil container. Built in 1910–11, the ranch house has undergone only two alterations: an 8 ft (2.4 m) rear porch addition, and the porch used for sleeping was enclosed. The owner has preserved the 1 1/2-and-one-half story side-gabled Craftsman.

The 2.4 acres (0.97 ha) property features a 200 ft (61 m) driveway that has access to the main road. Next to the main entrance in the east lies a shallow garden pond, with low shrubs lining the front porch. Towards the rear of the house, there is a tank house and a one-car garage. On the west side of the back porch, a windmill and a deteriorating aviary. The property is encircled by heritage oaks, mature redwood, mountain elm, buckeye, and palm trees. Situated 60 ft (18 m) from the back door is the original prune orchard.

The interior layout of the house closely follows the original architect's plans. The living room is centrally located and directly accessible from the front porch through the front door. Adjacent to it, there is a dining room, and the kitchen extends to the screened back porch. An open porch, now enclosed, is connected to the living room that is through a hallway. This hallway serves as a passage to the kitchen on the north and a bedroom on the south, which is connected to a bathroom. The bathroom further connects to another bedroom.

The house has two identical multi-pane windows on the south side. Each window is located on the north side of the dining room and kitchen and on the south side in the two bedrooms. Constructed in the Craftsman style, this house is made of wood, with frame, post, and beam construction. The exterior walls of the first story are covered with 8 ft (2.4 m) wide clapboard, while the upper story with framing of the shed dormer, has wood shingles arranged in a coursed pattern.

The roof is clad in synthetic shingles, featuring a wide, unenclosed eave overhang. There are no exposed rafter tails under the roofline. On each side along the rake edge, three beams extend to the roof edge, creating triangular knee braces collectively. The front facade has a full-width front porch. The southern half of the porch is screened for summer, while the northern half is enclosed with glass for winter use. The entire porch is sheltered under the main roof, which is upheld by four two-tiered square columns extending to ground level. These columns are covered in clapboard. Flanking the entry steps on both sides are matching pillars, each standing at a height of 2 ft (0.61 m).

== Historical status ==
The Miller-Melone Ranch was registered with the National Register of Historic Places on April 1, 1993. The City of Saratoga's General Plan includes the Miller-Melone Ranch as a historic landmark.

The ranch is historically significant under Criterion A, in the areas of agriculture due to its association with the 75-year time span within the latter phase of the agricultural golden era in the San Clara Valley. Additionally, the ranch house holds significance under Criterion C in architecture as an early example of the American Craftsman-style house. It was designed and built by Frank Delos Wolfe, a Craftsman designer in Santa Clara Valley. The period of significance from 1911 to 1940.

== See also ==
- National Register of Historic Places listings in Santa Clara County, California
