= Griffin (comics) =

Griffin, in comics, may refer to:

- Griffin (Dan Vado), an AWOL space mercenary originally published by DC Comics
- Griffin (DC Comics), a DC Comics character who is a novice superhero and roommate to Bart Allen
- Griffin (Marvel Comics), a Marvel comics supervillain
- Griffin, an alias used by the Clown in Marvel Comics' World War Hulk: Gamma Corps mini-series

== See also ==
- Griffin (disambiguation)
