= Griffen (surname) =

Griffen is a German surname. Notable people with the surname include:

- Anders Griffen, American musician and composer
- Davenport Griffen (1894–1986), American artist and muralist
- Everson Griffen (born 1987), American football player
- Hal Griffen (1902–1947), American football player and coach
- Horace B. Griffen Jr. (1894–1972), American baseball player, newspaperman and politician
- Jim Griffen (born 1885, deceased), New Zealand rugby league footballer
- Paul Griffen (born 1975), New Zealand-born rugby union player
- Ryan Griffen (born 1986), Australian rules footballer
- Vanessa Griffen, Fijian academic and campaigner
- Bridget Griffen-Foley (born 1970), Australian professor
- J. Griffen Greene (1910–1987), American educator

== See also ==
- Griffen (disambiguation)
- Griffin (surname)
