= Griffin House =

Griffin House may refer to:

== People ==
- Griffin House (musician), American musician

== Places ==
in Canada

- Griffin House (Ancaster), a 19th-century house and museum, site along the Underground Railroad

in the United States

(by state then town or city)

- Alfred Griffin House, Yuma, Arizona, listed on the National Register of Historic Places (NRHP) in Yuma County
- Willard Griffin House and Carriage House, Los Altos, California, listed on the NRHP in Santa Clara County
- Smith Griffin House, Hampton, Georgia, listed on the NRHP in Henry County
- Griffin House (Portland, Maine), NRHP-listed
- Griffin House (Moss Point, Mississippi), NRHP-listed
- Griffin-Spragins House, Greenville, Mississippi, NRHP-listed
- Smart-Griffin House, Natchez, Mississippi, listed on the NRHP in Adams County
- W. W. Griffin Farm, Williamston, North Carolina, listed on the NRHP in Martin County
- A.B. Griffin-O.H. Griffin House, Ravenna, Ohio, listed on the NRHP in Portage County
- Alexander B. Griffin House, Ravenna, Ohio, listed on the NRHP in Portage County
- Griffin House (Chickasha, Oklahoma), listed on the NRHP in Grady County
- John N. Griffin House, Astoria, Oregon, NRHP-listed
- Griffin-Christopher House, Pickens, South Carolina, NRHP-listed
- Mary S. and Gordon Griffin House, McAllen, Texas, listed on the NRHP in Hidalgo County
