= Willard Griffin House and Carriage House =

Historic house in Santa Clara County, California, United States

- U.S. National Register of Historic Places
- Griffin House
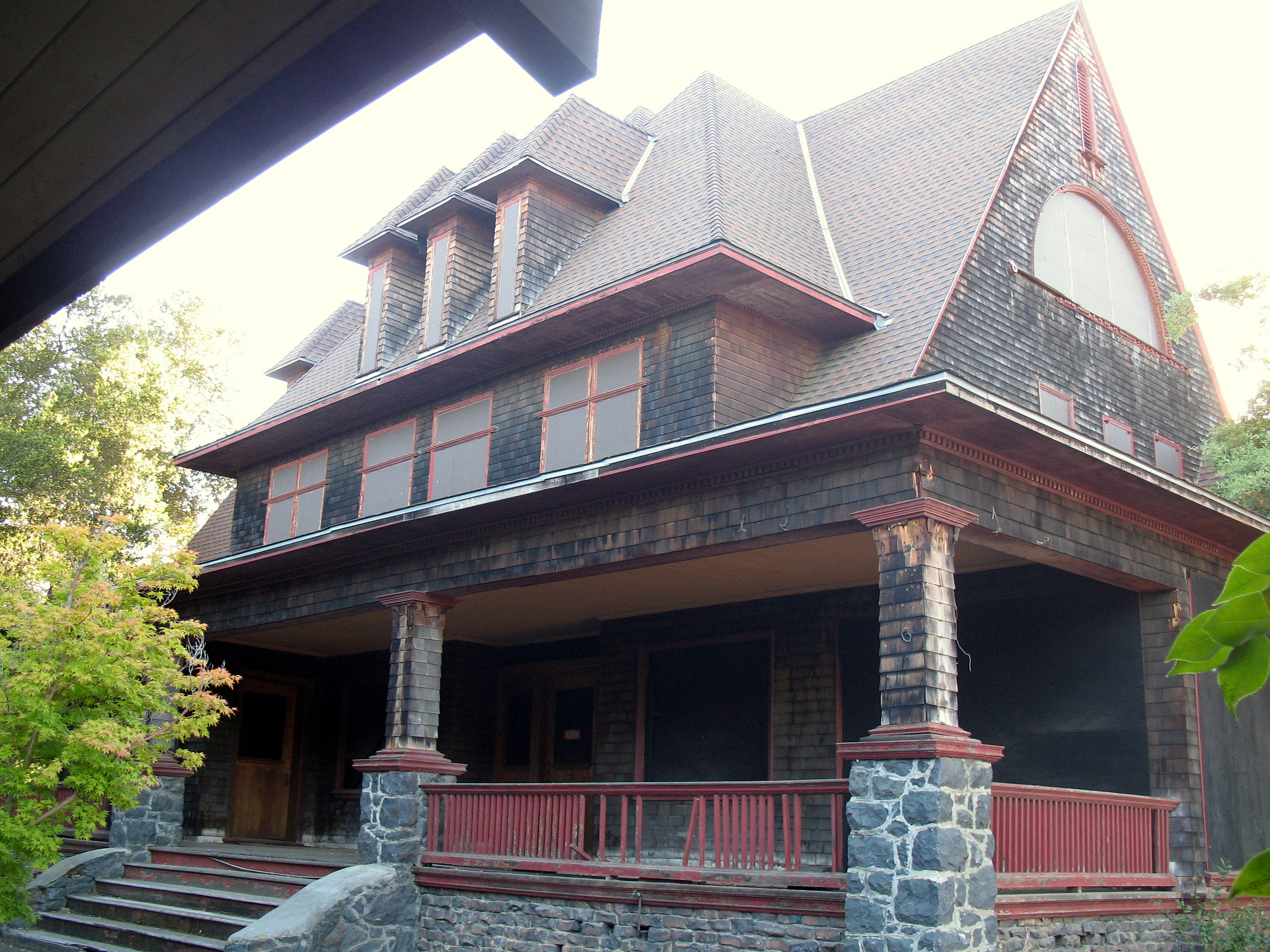
- Willard Griffin House

- Location within San Francisco Bay Area
- Location: 12345 S. El Monte Avenue, Los Altos, California, US
- Coordinates: 37°21′43″N 122°7′30″W
- Built: 1901
- Architect: Frank Delos Wolfe and Charles McKenzie
- Architectural style: American Craftsman
- NRHP reference No.: 77000342
- Added to NRHP: April 13, 1977

The Willard Griffin House and Carriage House is a historic mansion and carriage house located in Los Altos, California. The estate, constructed in 1901, features a three-story main house designed in the American Craftsman style. The Willard Griffin House and Carriage House was placed on the National Register of Historic Places on April 13, 1977. Today, the house and carriage house are located at the lower section of the Foothill College campus.

== History ==
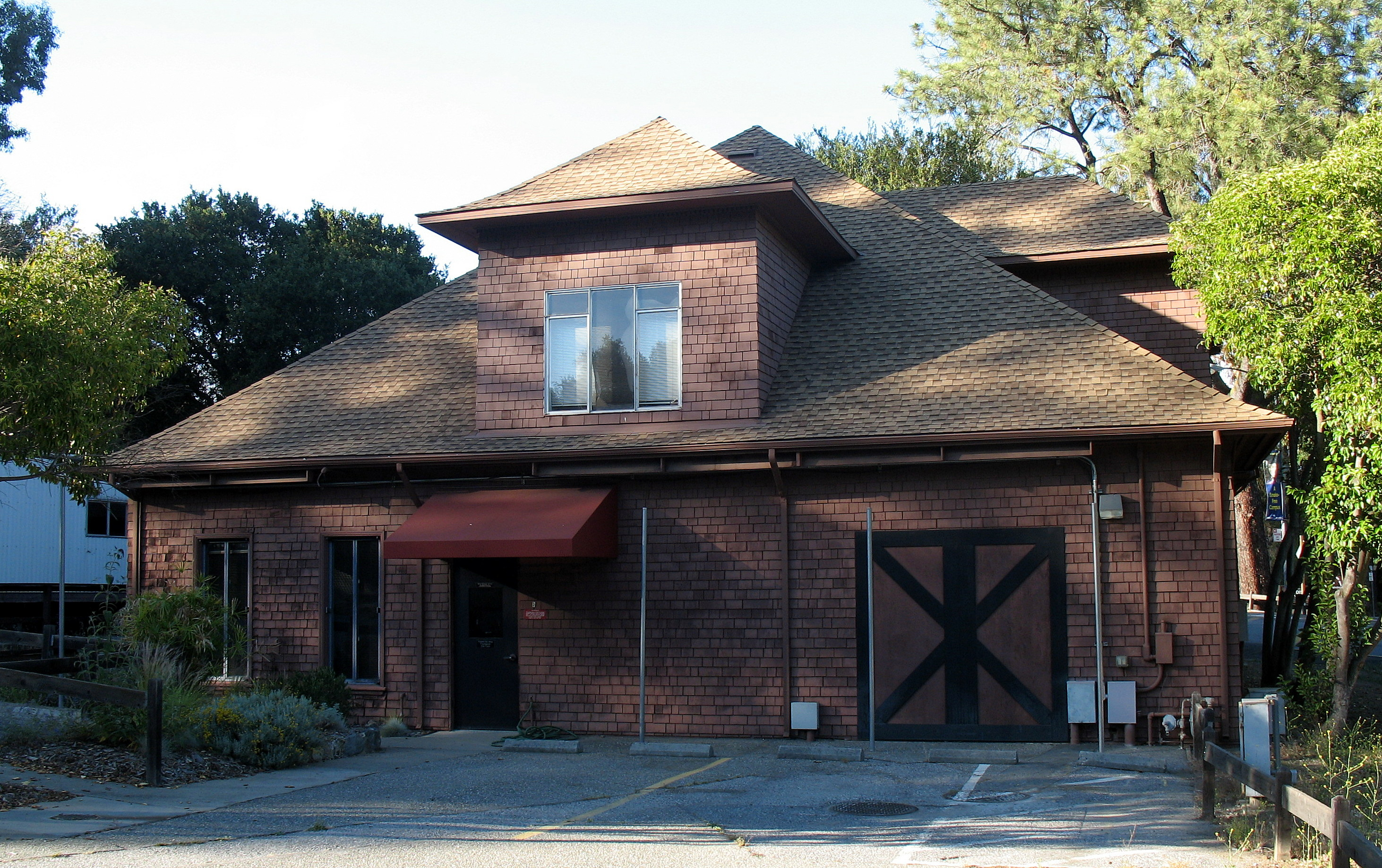
The Carriage House, 12345 S. El Monte Ave., Los Altos, CA.

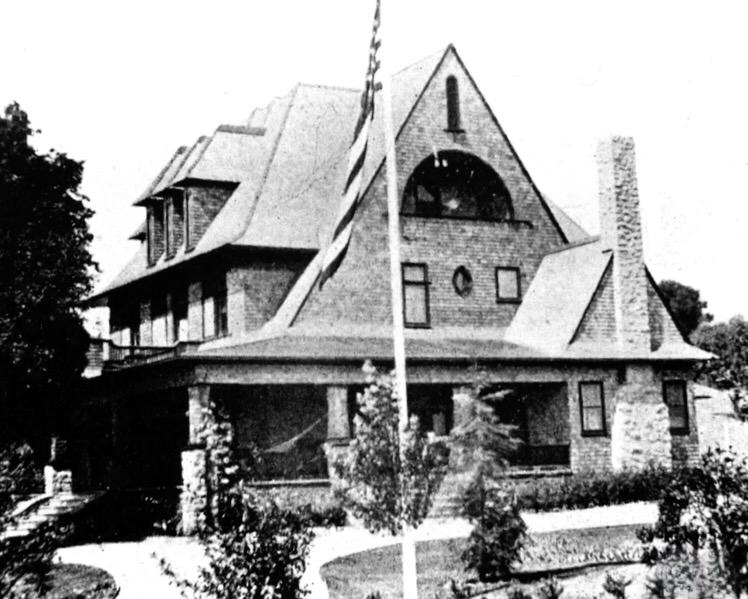
Griffin family home built in 1901

In the mid-1870s, Willard M. Griffin (1841-1913) and his family moved from Stockton Springs, Maine to California. Then, Griffin established Griffin & Skelley, a dried fruit packing company that joined with other firms to create the California Packing Corporation, known today as Del Monte Foods. Griffin purchased a 100 acres (40 ha) estate known as "Lake Grove" in Los Altos Hills. In 1901, he proceeded to build what is today known as the Willard Griffin House, or the Griffin House. The shingled American Craftsman style residence was designed by architects Frank Delos Wolfe and Charles McKenzie, while the construction was overseen by Edwin Greenwood and George Culver. The Carriage House, located on the same property as the main house, was used for the maintenance and storage of carriages, cows, and six horses. It later served as the station for the Los Altos Hills Fire Department for an extended period. The Carriage House now serves as the repository for the Foothill–De Anza Community College District's historic archives.

Griffin recruited a team of Japanese artisans from Japan to craft and care for the gardens across the property. They were responsible for the creation of the a tea house, as well as the construction of a bridge leading to it, along with various other garden structures.

Willard C. Griffin, the grandson of Willard M. Griffin, acquired the 100 acres (40 ha) property in 1936. He later retired to Portola Valley and died on April 1, 1975. In 1959, the property was acquired by the Foothill–De Anza Community College District, paving the way for the construction of Foothill College around the historic site. Ernest J. Kump, the campus architect, drew much of his design on elements based on the Griffin House. The remnants of the Griffin's fish pond and tea garden are still present, situated near the football field and directly behind the building that serves as the headquarters for Educational Technology Services.

The "Committee to Save the Griffin House," initiated in the 1990s, achieved a significant milestone in 1996. They successfully gathered $101,000 in public donations to address essential repairs, including reinforcing the foundation, adding a new shear wall, and completely replacing the sloping roof. As of November 2022, the Griffin House and Carriage House have been included in the project descriptions outlined in the Foothill-De Anza Community College District Sustainability Action Plan. These descriptions pertain to the installation of new heating and cooling systems in the buildings, along with the necessary connections to existing or new utilities.

== Design ==
The Griffin House, designed by architects Frank Delos Wolfe and Charles McKenzie, spans three levels. The ground floor comprises a living room, dining room, study, kitchen, and pantry. The living room of the Griffin House had a brick fireplace, serving as the main heat source. On the second floor, there are five bedrooms and an indoor bathroom. The third floor primarily serves as an attic, yet it has a balcony on one side.

The Griffin House was in the 1907 Book of Designs, a publication featuring various home designs from across the country. It was the sole entry in the book to showcase both its exterior and interior design. The home has over 5,000 square feet (460 m^{2}), and it was constructed entirely using California redwood.

== Historical significance ==
The Willard Griffin House and Carriage House was placed on the National Register of Historic Places on April 13, 1977, by the United States Department of the Interior. This house and carriage house holds historical significance under Criterion A within the field of architecture, as it is closely associated with Frank Delos Wolfe 1862–1926) and Charles McKenzie, who played a significant role in shaping the architectural landscape of now-historic neighborhoods in the Santa Clara Valley. Four of their undertakings have earned a place on the National Register of Historic Places.

== See also ==
- National Register of Historic Places listings in Santa Clara County, California
