= Cayuga Island =

Island in the Niagara River

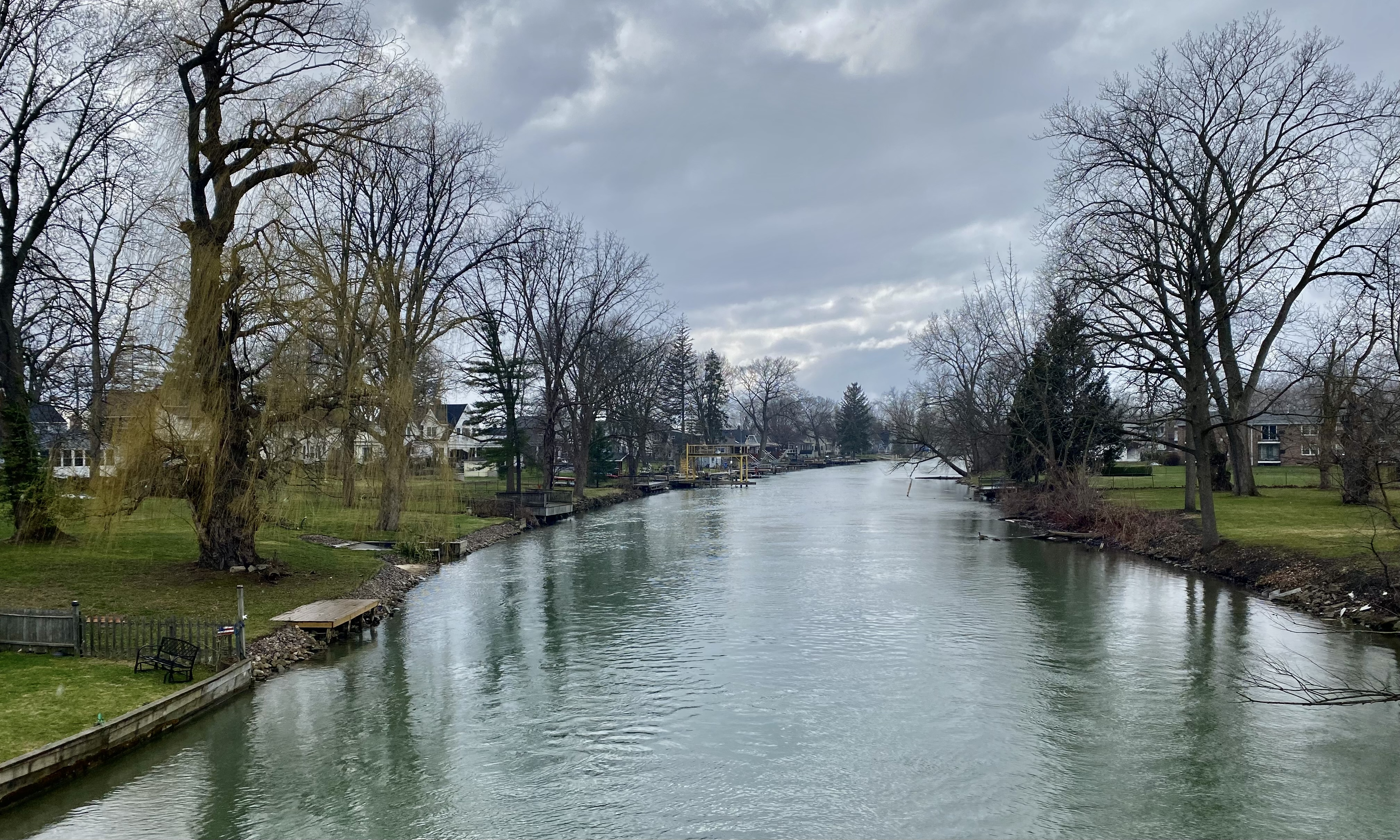
- Little River, and Cayuga Island on right

- Location within New York Location within the United States

Geography
- Location: Niagara River
- Coordinates: 43°04′24″N 78°57′29″W
- Area: 140 acres (57 ha)
- Length: 1.25 mi (2.01 km)
- Width: 0.35 mi (0.56 km)
- Highest elevation: 571 ft (174 m)

Administration
- United States
- State: New York
- County: Niagara County

Cayuga Island is an island in Niagara County, New York, United States. The Niagara River flows along the south side of the island, and a stream, Little River (also called "Little Niagara River"), forms a channel along the north side.

It is part of the LaSalle area of Niagara Falls, New York. It consists of middle-class housing and a city park.

The island is believed to be the place where 17th-century French explorer Rene-Robert Cavelier, Sieur de La Salle built his barque called Le Griffon in 1679.

== See also ==
- List of islands of New York
- Niagara River#Islands
