= Vanessa Griffen =

Fijian academic and writer

Vanessa Griffen is a Fijian academic and writer who campaigns against the use and proliferation of nuclear weapons.

== Biography ==
Griffen was born in Suva, Fiji and attended the University of the South Pacific. She and a group of fellow students and graduates formed a writers' group, University of the South Pacific Arts Group (UNISPAC) to promote creative writing and encourage each other to have their work published. Griffen specialises in writing short stories, which she began to publish from 1969. These stories make a major contribution to Pacific literature.

As a student, Griffen became aware of the environmental and genetic impacts of radioactivity from French nuclear weapons testing in French Polynesia. She joined the anti-nuclear movement ATOM (Against Testing on Mururoa) and helped form the Nuclear Free and Independent Pacific network. In 1975 she was part of a group of 5 Fijian women who attended the United Nations' International Year of the Woman conference in Mexico City, including Amelia Rokotuivuna. She later joined the International Campaign to Abolish Nuclear Weapons and presented a statement at the United Nations negotiations on the Treaty on the Prohibition of Nuclear Weapons.

== Publications ==
- Women's role in Fiji (co-writer), South Pacific Social Services Association, 1975
- Women Speak Out! A Report of the Pacific Women's Conference, The Pacific Women's Conference, 1976
- Caring for Ourselves: A Health Handbook for Pacific Women (editor), University of the South Pacific, 1983
- Women, Development and Empowerment: A Pacific Feminist Perspective (editor), Asian and Pacific Development Centre, 1989
