= Judge Griffin =

Judge Griffin may refer to:

- Cyrus Griffin (1748–1810), judge of the United States District Court for the District of Virginia
- Frank Griffin (judge) (1919–2016), judge of the Supreme Court of Ireland
- Jefferson Griffin (fl. 2010s–2020s), judge of the North Carolina Court of Appeals
- Jürgen Griffin, fictional character from Judge Dredd media
- Marc Griffin (born 1956), American lawyer who became the world's youngest judge at age 17 in 1974
- Richard Allen Griffin (born 1952), judge of the United States Court of Appeals for the Sixth Circuit

== See also ==
- Justice Griffin (disambiguation)
