= Griffen =

Griffen may refer to:

- Gribshunden or Griffen, a 15th-century Danish warship
- Griffen, Austria, a town in the district of Völkermarkt in Carinthia
- Griffen Gun, an artillery cannon invented by John Griffen and used by the North during the American Civil War
- Griffen Island, West Virginia, U.S.

== People with the name ==
- Griffen (surname), German language surname
- Griffen Molino (born 1994), American ice hockey player
- Griffen Palmer (born 1995), Canadian singer and songwriter

== See also ==
- Griffin (disambiguation)
- Griffon (disambiguation)
