= Griffin (given name) =

Griffin is a masculine given name of Welsh origin. The name derives from Griffinus, which is a Latinised version of Griffith which was commonly used in medieval Wales. Griffith is an Anglicized form of Gruffydd, which ultimately derives from the Old Welsh Grippiud (prince).

The name may refer to:

- Griffin Alexander Stedman (1838-1864), Union Army Colonel in the American Civil War
- Griffin Barrows (born 1987 or 1988), American gay pornographic film actor
- Griffin Bell (1918-2009), American lawyer and former U.S. Attorney General
- Griffin Boice, American multi-platinum record producer, mixer, songwriter, and composer
- Griffin Canning (born 1996), American MLB player
- Griffin Colapinto (born 1998), American professional surfer
- Griffin Colby (born 1992), South African rugby referee
- Griffin Conine (born 1997), American professional baseball player
- Griffin Curteys (by 1521-1587), English Member of Parliament
- Griffin De Vroe (born 1984), Belgian footballer
- Griffin Dillon (born 2003), American soccer player
- Griffin Dorsey (born 1999), American soccer player
- Griffin Dunne (born 1955), American actor, film producer and director
- Griffin Easter (born 1991), American cyclist
- Griffin Frazen (born 1987), American actor
- Griffin Gluck (born 2000), American actor
- Griffin Greene (1749-1804), Continental Army officer during the American Revolutionary War and pioneer settler in what is now Ohio
- Griffin Higgs (1589-1659), English churchman
- Griffin House (musician) (born 1980), American musician and songwriter
- Griffin Jax (born 1994), American MLB player
- Griffin Layne, American country music singer and songwriter
- Griffin Logue (born 1988), Australian footballer
- Griffin Lotson (born 1954), African-American historian
- Griffin Markham (died after 1644), English soldier
- Griffin Matthews (born 1981/82), American actor, writer, and director
- Griffin McElroy (born 1987), American podcaster and co-founder of Polygon
- Griffin McMaster (born 1983), Australian footballer
- Griffin Money (1865-1958), Australian politician
- Griffin Murray, Irish archaeologist and art historian
- Griffin Neal, American football player
- Griffin Neame (born 2001), New Zealand professional rugby league footballer
- Griffin Newman (born 1989), American actor and comedian
- Griffin Oakes (born 1995), American football player
- Griffin O'Neal (born 1964), American actor, son of actor Ryan O'Neal
- Griffin P. Rodgers, American director, researcher, physician, scientist, and hematologist
- Griffin Reinhart (born 1994), Canadian ice hockey player
- Griffin Roberts (born 1996), American MLB player
- Griffin Sabatini (born 1998), Swiss professional footballer
- Griffin Seward (1842-1908), American Civil War Medal of Honor recipient
- Griffin Smith (1885-1955), Chief Justice of the Arkansas Supreme Court
- Griffin Yow (born 2002), American professional soccer player
