= Gryphon Audio Designs =

Gryphon Audio Designs is a manufacturer of high-end audio equipment located in Denmark. Gryphon is known for their extremely expensive cost-no-object audio equipment, with few updates and product changes compared to their competition.

== History ==
Gryphon was started by Flemming E. Rasmussen, after he obtained a degree in graphics arts from the Aarhus Art Academy in Denmark and he had been involved in the local music community as well as employed as a designer for a sportswear company. Mr. Rasmussen first founded 2R Marketing, which was an importer of high end audio products into Denmark, and developed a moving coil preamplifier for record players. After this preamp (which became the "Gryphon Head Amp") was shown at the 1986 Consumer Electronics Show it developed sufficient interest in Japan to justify the formation of a sister company, which has become Gryphon Audio Designs. Gryphon Audio Designs became a formal company in 1985, and gradually the importing of audio components into Denmark by 2R Marketing was phased out until it ceased in 1993.

Mr. Rasmussen owns a collection of master reel to reel tapes from the 1950s and 1960s. These tapes are played on a modified Studer A80 Reel to Reel tape deck to listen to products as they are being designed, in order to achieve a final product with the desired sound.

Gryphon products are designed and built by Gryphon Audio Designs at the factory in Ry, Denmark. Service is accomplished by Gryphon Audio Designs at their facility. To aid in service, the individual circuit boards in each Gryphon product has its own quality control certificate, while the completed unit also has its own quality control certificate. Records of all boards and devices are maintained at Gryphon Audio Designs, and all products are fully traceable.

== Characteristics of Gryphon products ==
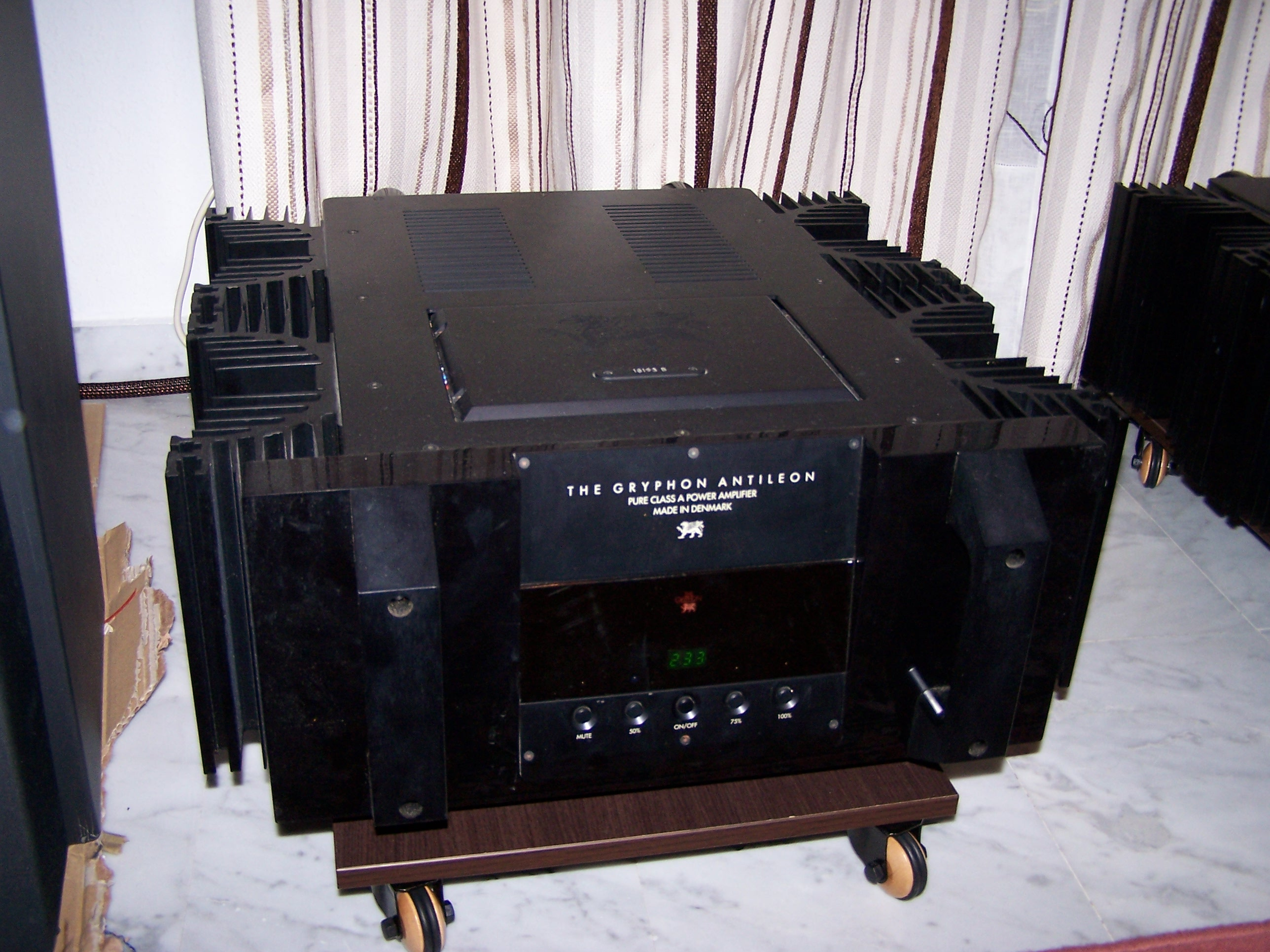
Gryphon Antileon Solo Monoblock Amplifier

Gryphon products are almost always dual mono, meaning each stereo channel is independent of the other, including separate power supplies and power transformers. Some even have separate power cords.

Gryphon products are almost always black, with black acrylic on the front panel.

Gryphon products typically have a very wide frequency response, much higher than 20 kHz, which is around the threshold of what is heard by humans.

Gryphon amplifiers have always been pure "class A" in circuit design, until the introduction of the Gryphon "Encore" amplifier. Class-A amplifiers set their output transistors to be operated in their most accurate, and most inefficient, range. Gryphon 100-watt-per-channel class-A amplifiers dissipate over 400 watts per channel even with no signal applied to their inputs. Gryphon uses large heat sinks and/or fans in their amplifiers to dissipate this large amount of heat.
