= Griffin College =

Coordinates: 47.615476°N 122.348436°W

Griffin College, also referred to as Griffin Business College, was founded as a family-owned business college in Seattle, Washington in 1909. In 1986, Griffin was sold to Phillips Colleges, a national chain of 92 private schools. Aggressive expansion of the school coincided with accreditation renewal issues and eventually the college closed in 1993.
