= HMS Griffon =

Six ships of the Royal Navy have borne the name HMS Griffon, an alternative spelling of the legendary creature, the Griffin. Another ship was planned, but later cancelled and reordered from a different dockyard:

- HMS Griffon (1758) was a 28-gun sixth rate launched in 1758 and wrecked in 1761.
- HMS Griffon (1808) was a French 16-gun brig-sloop launched in 1806. HMS Bacchante captured her in 1808 and the navy sold her in 1819. She then served as a merchant vessel until c. 1846.
- HMS Griffon was to have been a 10-gun Cherokee-class brig-sloop, ordered in 1820 but cancelled in 1828 and reordered, this time from Chatham Dockyard.
- HMS Griffon (1832) was a 10-gun Cherokee-class brig-sloop launched in 1832. She was on harbour service from 1854, was used as a coal hulk from 1857 and was broken up in 1869. She was listed as HMS Griffin from 1858.
- HMS Griffon (1860) was a wooden screw gunvessel launched in 1860 and stranded after a collision in 1866.
- HMS Griffon (1876) was a composite screw gunvessel launched in 1876 and sold to the Board of Trade in 1891 as the hulk Richmond.
- HMS Griffon (1896) was an Earnest-class destroyer launched in 1896, reclassified as a B-class destroyer in 1913 and sold in 1920.

== See also ==
- HMS Griffin
