= Amelia Rokotuivuna =

Fijian feminist and anti-nuclear activist

- Born: Amelia Vakasokolaca Rokotuivuna; 7 August 1941; Tailevu Province, Viti Levu, Fiji
- Died: 2 June 2005 (aged 63)
- Occupation: General Secretary of Fiji’s YWCA
- Known for: Activism for women’s and worker’ rights; opposition to Fijian coups; opposition to nuclear tests in the Pacific
- Children: One son

Amelia Rokotuivuna was a Fijian socialist and feminist community leader and activist, who was known for her opposition to French nuclear tests in the Pacific and to the Fijian military coups in 1987 and 2000.

== Early life ==
Amelia Vakasokolaca Rokotuivuna was born on 7 August 1941 in the village of Vatukarasa in Tailevu Province on Fiji's largest island of Viti Levu. Her childhood was spent at the Vatukoula mine, also on Viti Levu, where her father was a cook. Her intelligence enabled her to go as a boarder to Adi Cakobau School, Fiji's leading school for girls, where she became head girl. Rokotuivuna was the first staff member of the Fiji YWCA, which had been established by two Australians, Ruth Lechte and Anne S. Walker, in 1962. She worked as a receptionist and coordinator of the YWCA's Girls Clubs. In 1967, she obtained a diploma in social administration and development from the University of Swansea in Wales.

== Career and activism ==
With Fiji's Independence from the United Kingdom scheduled for 1970, there was widespread debate over the issue of political representation in the country's new parliament, and the number of seats reserved for each of Fiji's ethnic communities, Rokotuivuna and other YWCA members took part in a 1965 forum to hear women's views on the future constitution and electoral system. She used this opportunity to challenge the existing communal system of electoral representation, strongly criticising the colonial practice of reserving Legislative Council positions for members of the Great Council of Chiefs and arguing that the Council should be disbanded. The Council was finally disestablished in 2012, after her death, but at the time her ideas provoked considerable opposition, with indigenous Fijians arguing that she was putting forward an "Indian agenda".

In 1973, Rokotuivuna became general secretary of the YWCA. Under her leadership, the organization became an activist organization that worked for peace and democracy, in a country where there were often significant conflicts between the indigenous Melanesian population and the descendants of indentured Indian labourers who were sent to Fiji to work on sugar plantations. Although many Fijians opposed the YWCA's involvement in such activities, she led the fight for equal rights for women, a nuclear-free Pacific, and political reform in Fiji's multicultural society, and became the key spokesperson for all NGOs. Early members of the YMCA found that, unlike the well-established women's organizations whose leadership structures generally reflected age or social status hierarchies, the YWCA encouraged young, educated, community-minded local women with an interest in social and political change. Lacking the necessary social status, Rokotuivuna could never have risen to the top of other women's organizations in the country. She worked hard to establish strong links with university students. In 1974, the YWCA controversially presented a submission to government calling for increased activity in the area of family planning, and the legalisation of abortion, drawing attention to the number of deaths occurring due to back-street abortions. In addition to advocacy, the YMCA organized vocational training, attracting up to 500 students per year.

Although the YWCA attracted donations from the private sector, Rokotuivuna did not compromise her socialist beliefs when promoting workers' rights, advocating for the formation of trade unions. She was also keen to upgrade the position of household workers, supporting their efforts to create a union.

From 1992 to 1995, Rokotuivuna worked as Programme Secretary for Advocacy for the World YWCA headquarters in Geneva, Switzerland. At the time of her death, she was President of the Fiji YWCA Board of Directors and a lecturer at the University of the South Pacific in Suva.

== Anti-nuclear activism ==
Protests against French nuclear tests in the region, which Rokotuivuna played a leading role in organizing, became almost daily events. These were particularly organized outside the office of the French airline UTA, which serviced French territories and colonies. She was one of the founders of ATOM (Against Testing on Moruroa), FANG (Fiji Anti-Nuclear Group), and NFIP (Nuclear Free and Independent Pacific), which arose out of a regional conference called by ATOM and later became PCRC (Pacific Concerns Resource Centre). She was very much involved with that Conference, which was held in Suva in April, 1975. International awareness of her opposition to French testing led to an invitation to participate in an NGO meeting held in parallel with the first United Nations World Conference on Women, held in Mexico City in 1975, where she spoke out against nuclear testing in the Pacific by the French, American and British nuclear powers.

== Opposition to military coups ==
In 1980, Rokotuivuna co-organised a protest against the Chilean dictator, Augusto Pinochet, when his plane landed in Fiji for refuelling, throwing tomatoes at the plane and persuading the airport ground staff to refuse to refuel the plane, resulting in the Fijian military having to do the job. During the two Fijian coups in 1987, which were aimed at ensuring that the indigenous Fijians would not lose power to the Indo-Fijians, Rokotuivuna paid a personal price by defying many fellow Fijians to argue for a multicultural and tolerant vision of Fiji. She was briefly imprisoned for her ideas. Rokotuivuna has said that the major challenge for Fiji people was to understand human rights. She led a youth protest march after the first of the two coups. Later, she worked with the Citizens' Constitutional Forum in the 1990s to secure popular agreement on a new democratic constitution.

== Publications ==
- Working with women: a community development handbook for Pacific women. 1988. South Pacific Commission Handbook No. 29.
- Fiji: a developing Australian colony. 1973. International Development Action. In this paper, Rokotuivuna argued that Australia's position as the dominant economic power in Fiji would contribute to the exacerbation in the future of existing problems, particularly in light of the country's reliance upon a sugar industry that was largely controlled by the Australian company, Colonial Sugar Refinery.

== Death ==
Amelia Rokotuivuna died of cancer on 2 June 2005. She had one son.

== See also ==
- List of peace activists
