= Gryphon (parachute system) =

Military parachute system

The Gryphon is a military wingpack that currently allows paratroopers to exit an aircraft at an altitude of 10 kilometres, then fly 40 kilometres while carrying up to 100 pounds of equipment. The system is still in development and the goal, according to Elektroniksystem- und Logistik-GmbH (Electronic System and Logistics Group or ESG), is to allow paratroopers to fly up to 200 kilometres per hour, thus enabling them to penetrate enemy airspace without compromising the safety of the aircraft or being detected by radar.

Skydivers can currently use it to leave an aircraft at an altitude of 10 km, glide 40 km to a landing site, and carry 100 kg of equipment. Paragliders are significantly superior to the Gryphon in terms of performance, but the Gryphon flies much faster. Extreme athlete Felix Baumgartner demonstrated the flight suit's capabilities on July 31, 2003, when he crossed the English Channel wearing the predecessor model, SkyRay.

A further goal of the development is to extend the gliding distance to 200 km, thus enabling the Gryphon to be used for longer-range military surprise attacks by paratroopers, as is currently already the case with slower paragliders.
