= Griffin House (Moss Point, Mississippi) =

Historic house in Mississippi, United States

- U.S. National Register of Historic Places
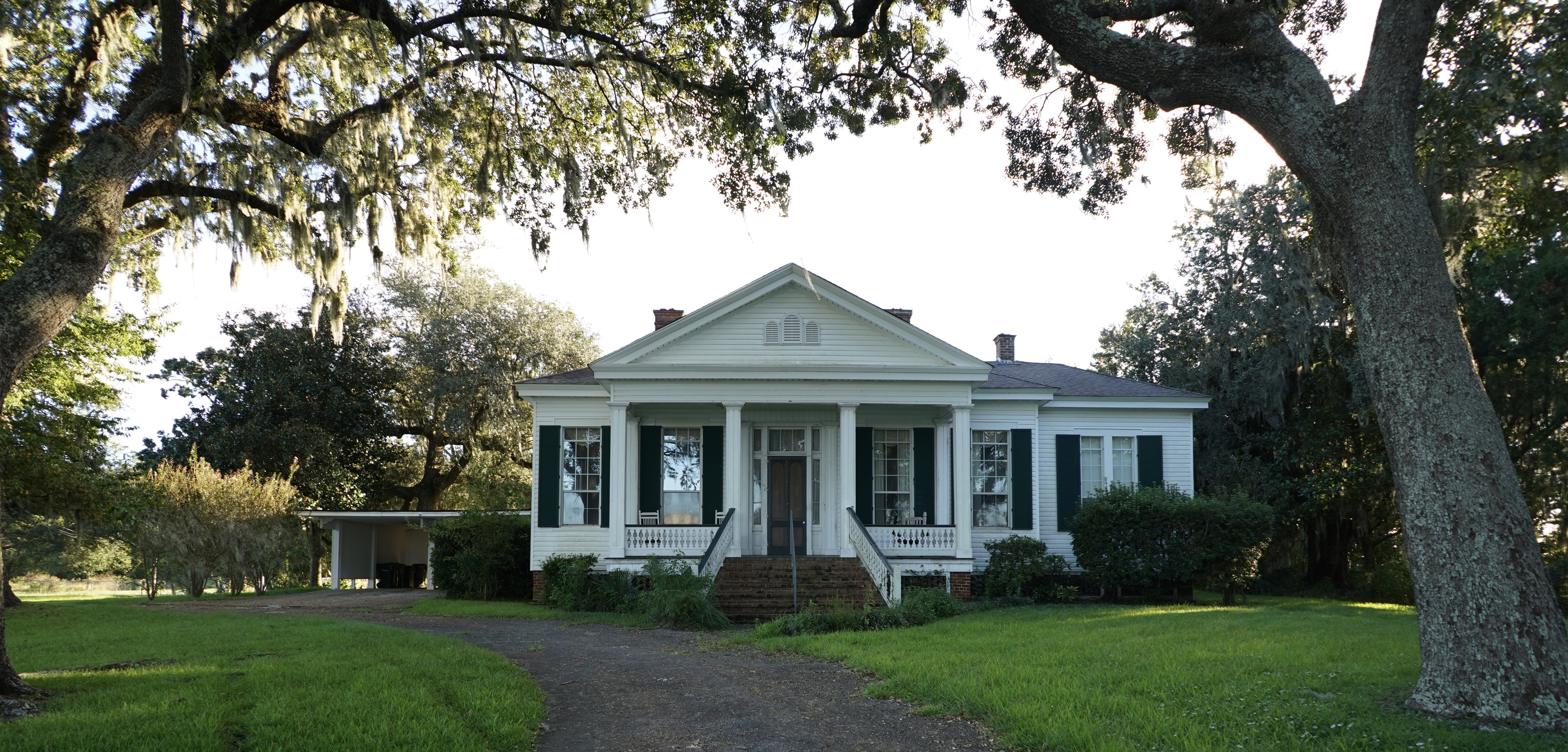

- Location within Mississippi Location within the United States
- Location: 100 Griffin St., Moss Point, Mississippi
- Coordinates: 30°25′17″N 88°33′30″W
- Architectural style: Greek Revival
- NRHP reference No.: 83000955
- Added to NRHP: July 7, 1983

Griffin House in Moss Point, Mississippi, United States, is a Greek Revival building built in the mid-1800s. It is located on a 50-acre (20 ha) property overlooking the joining of the Pascagoula River and the Escatawpa River, about 5 miles (8.0 km) in from the outlet of the Pascagoula to the Gulf of Mexico. It was listed on the National Register of Historic Places in 1983.

It was deemed significant as "one of the more architecturally and historically significant buildings in Jackson County...a good example of late Greek Revival architecture with Italianate influence...[and] one of the few surviving mid-nineteenth-century residences in the area."

Its historical importance relates to its continuous association with the Griffin and Dantzler families, who were pioneers in the lumber industry of Mississippi. William Griffin opened the first successful lumber mill (in the state?). The house was built for Dr. Erasmus T. Griffin, son of William. It served as the business office for the Dantzler Lumber Company during the early 1900s. As of 1983, it was still in the family, owned by William Griffin's great-grandson A. F. Dantzler.
