= Griffin-Christopher House =

Historic house in South Carolina, United States

- U.S. National Register of Historic Places
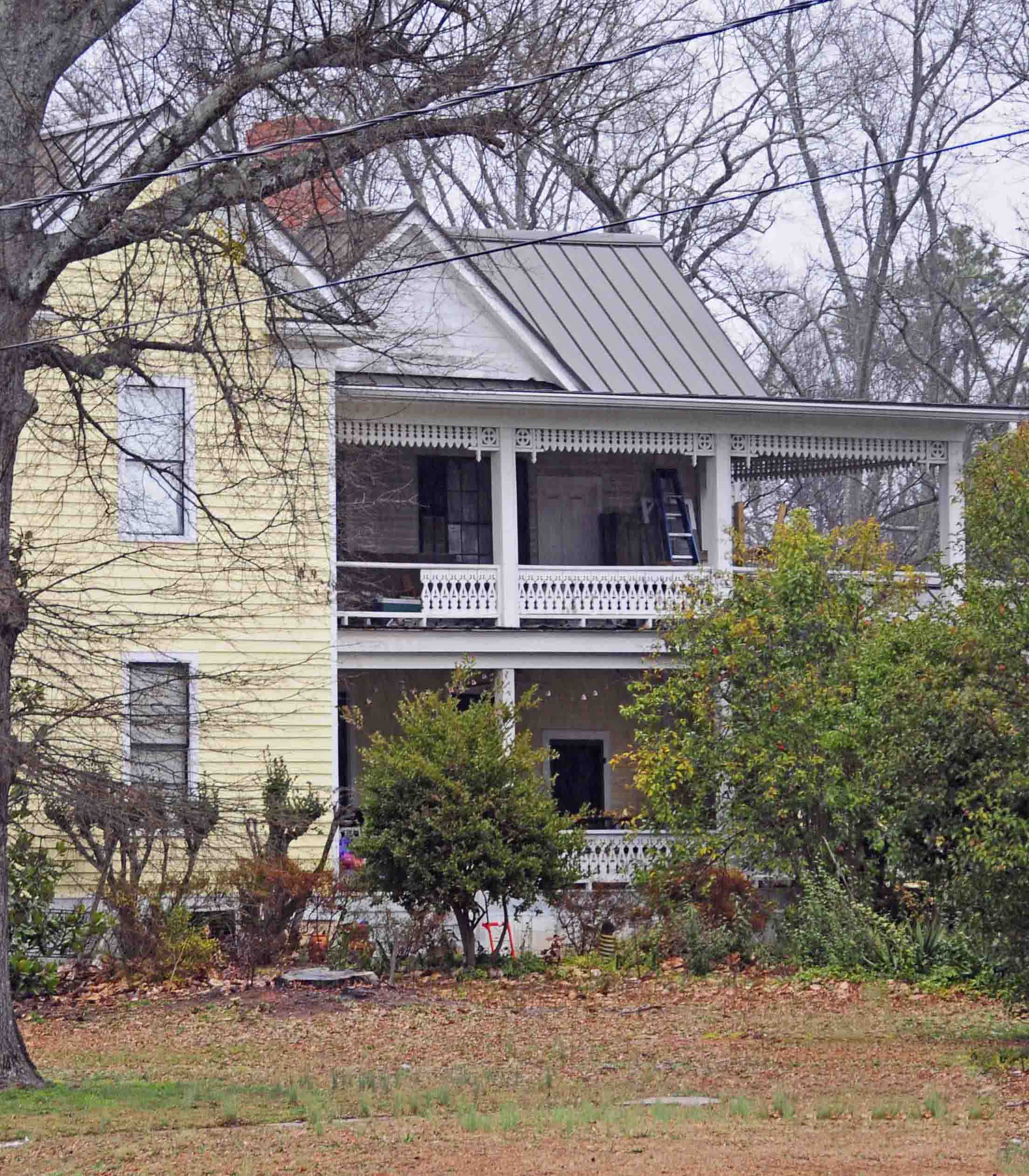
- Griffin-Christopher House, February 2012

- Location within South Carolina Location within the United States
- Location: 208 Ann St., Pickens, South Carolina
- Coordinates: 34°54′10″N 82°37′03″W
- Area: less than one acre
- Built: 1887
- Architectural style: Folk Victorian I-house
- NRHP reference No.: 01001160
- Added to NRHP: October 21, 2001

Griffin-Christopher House is a historic home located Pickens, Pickens County, South Carolina. It was built in 1887, and is a two-story, frame "L"-plan, I-house with a two-story rear addition. It features a two-tiered full-height front and side porches with Folk Victorian decorative elements including jig-saw cut wood trim.

It was listed on the National Register of Historic Places in 2001.
