= Griffin Inn =

Griffin inn may refer to:

- Griffin Inn, a popular Pub name
- Griffin Inn, Nantwich, England, an 18th-century inn
- The Griffin, Widnes, England, now a Chef & Brewer pub, an 18th-century inn

== See also ==
- Fuller's Brewery#Griffin Brewery
- The Griffin, Monmouth, Wales, a public house
