= Griffin Creek (Bear Creek tributary) =

Geographic feature in Oregon, United States

Coordinates: 42°23′42″N 122°55′33″W

Griffin Creek is a stream in the U.S. state of Oregon. It is a tributary to Bear Creek.

Griffin Creek was named in 1852 after Captain B.B. Griffin.
