= Frank Delos Wolfe =

American architect

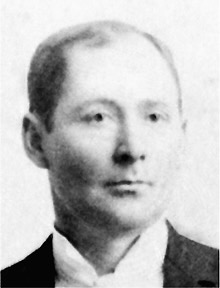
- Wolfe in his early 30s
- Born: September 29, 1862; Green Springs, Ohio, US
- Died: August 19, 1926 (aged 63); San Francisco, California, US
- Occupation: Architect
- Buildings: Willard Griffin House and Carriage House
- Projects: Naglee Park
- Design: Prairie style

Frank Delos Wolfe (September 29, 1862–August 19, 1926) was an American architect who played a significant role in shaping the architectural landscape of now-historic neighborhoods in the Santa Clara Valley. He also designed schools, hospital, and apartments.

== Early life ==
Frank Wolfe was born on September 29, 1862 in Green Springs, Sandusky, Ohio. In 1888 he moved to San Jose, California.

== Career ==
In 1892 he began work as an architect. He worked with architect Joseph O. McKee where he met Charles McKenzie. Wolfe partnered with McKenzie from 1899 to 1910 and created the architectural firm "Wolfe and McKenzie." Together they designed hundreds of buildings. Wolfe and McKenzie worked on houses in Naglee Park beginning in 1902 and then Hanchett Park beginning in 1907. Frank's son Carl joined him as an associate in 1912.

Under the Wolfe & Wolfe partnership Wolfe designed several California Prairie style homes. He introduced Prairie-style homes to the Santa Clara Valley. Wolfe designed houses of Palm Haven in Willow Glen.

In 1917, Wolfe became partners with his son and the architect William Ernest Higgins from Santa Clara to establish the firm Wolfe & Higgins, which operated from 1917-1931.

== Death ==
Wolfe died of cancer at Lane hospital in San Francisco on August 19, 1926. Following Wolfe's death in 1926, his son Carl took over the partnership.

== See also ==
- National Register of Historic Places listings in Santa Clara County, California
