= Griffin Hotel, Attleborough =

Hotel in Attleborough, Norfolk, England

Griffin Hotel
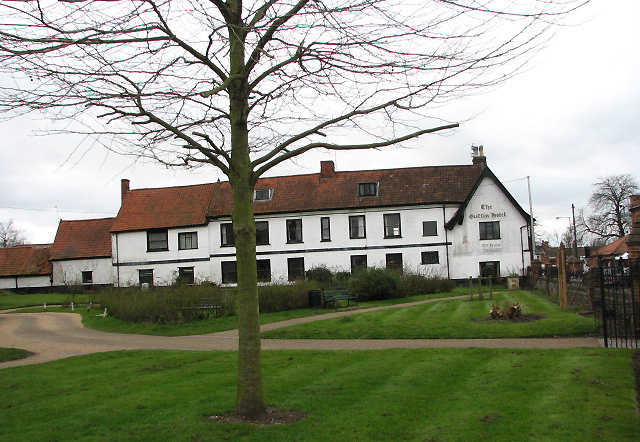

- Norfolk

General information
- Location: Attleborough, Breckland, Norfolk, England, 19 Church Street; Attleborough; Norfolk; NR17 2AH
- Coordinates: 52°31′4.70″N 1°1′3.39″E
- Opening: cica 1560

Technical details
- Floor count: 2

Other information
- Number of rooms: 6 en-suite bedrooms
- Number of restaurants: 1
- Parking: yes

Website
- Hotel website

Listed Building – Grade II
- Designated: 21 July 1951
- Reference no.: 1077545

The Griffin Hotel is located in the English town of Attleborough in the county of Norfolk. It has been a Grade II listed building since the 21 July 1951.

== Location ==
The hotel is located on Church Street in the centre of the town. The hotel is next to, and overlooks the parish church of the Assumption of the Blessed Virgin Mary. The hotel is 0.4 miles (0.64 km) north west of Attleborough railway station. The hotel is 15.2 miles (24.5 km) south west of the city of Norwich. The nearest airport is also at Norwich and that is 17.7 miles (28.5 km) north east of the hotel.

== History ==
The first inn on this site opened its doors to travelers in 1560 during the early part of the reign of Queen Elizabeth I. The original inn is located in the front of the building facing on to Church Street. The hotel was extended in the 17th and 18th centuries with and this part of the buildings frontage faces east towards the parish church. By this time the Griffin had become a busy coaching inn. An interesting feature of the archway and courtyard were the use of wooden cobbles installed to muffle the horse's hooves, so as not to disturb the guests sleeping upstairs.
