= Griffins RFC =

- Full name: Griffins Rugby Football Club
- Nickname(s): Griffins
- Founded: 2011
- Location: Kotka, Finland
- Chairman: Petri Maaskola
Team kit

Griffins RFC is a Finnish rugby club in Kotka.

== History ==
The club was founded in 2011.
