= Griffin Stadium =

Griffin Stadium may refer to:

- Ben Hill Griffin Stadium, the football stadium of the University of Florida
- James Griffin Stadium, the football stadium of the Concordia University, Saint Paul

See also

- Griffith Stadium
