= Griffin Inlet =

Inlet in Nunavut, Canada

Coordinates: 75°07′06″N 092°10′04″W

Griffin Inlet is a body of water in the Qikiqtaaluk Region of Nunavut, Canada. Situated in Wellington Channel, it lies north of Cape Bowden, off the southwestern coast of Devon Island, in the eastern high Arctic.

It was discovered by and named for Samuel P. Griffin, commander of the ship Rescue during the search for the lost Sir John Franklin expedition.
