= Justice Griffin =

Justice Griffin may refer to:

- John Griffin (judge) (fl. 1770s–1800s), associate justice of the Supreme Court of Michigan Territory
- Joseph Ruble Griffin (1923–1988), associate justice of the Mississippi Supreme Court
- Meade F. Griffin (1894–1974), justice of the Texas Supreme Court
- Piper D. Griffin (born 1962), associate justice of the Louisiana Supreme Court
- Robert P. Griffin (1923–2015), associate justice of the Michigan Supreme Court

== See also ==
- Judge Griffin (disambiguation)
