= HMS Griffin =

Six ships of the Royal Navy have borne the name HMS Griffin, after the legendary creature, the Griffin:

- HMS Griffin (1655) was a 12-gun Royalist ship, captured by the Parliamentarians in 1655. She foundered in 1664.
- HMS Griffin (1690) was an 8-gun fireship launched in 1690, rebuilt in 1702 and sold in 1737.
- HMS Griffin (1712) was a 44-gun fifth rate, previously the French Griffon. She was captured in 1712 and restored to France in 1713.
- HMS Griffin (1758) was a 28-gun sixth rate launched in 1758 and wrecked in 1761.
- HMS Griffin (1778) was a 12-gun cutter purchased in 1778 and sold in 1786. Under the command of Lieutenant Inglis, she captured a French privateer brig of sixteen 6-pounder guns on about 21 May 1779.
- HMS Griffin (H31) was a G-class destroyer launched in 1935. She was transferred to the Royal Canadian Navy in 1943 and renamed HMCS Ottawa, and was sold in 1946.

== See also ==
- HMS Griffon
- Hired armed cutter Griffin
