= Griffin Creek (Alberta) =

Stream in Alberta, Canada

Coordinates: 55.98337°N 117.8027°W

Griffin Creek is a stream in Alberta, Canada.

Griffin Creek has the name of Thomas Griffin, a pioneer citizen.

== See also ==
- List of rivers of Alberta
