= Griffin De Vroe =

Belgian footballer

Personal information
- Date of birth: 2 November 1984 (age 41)
- Position: Goalkeeper

Senior career*
Years	Team	Apps	(Gls)
2004–2008	Lokeren	3	(0)
2008–2012	Standard Wetteren		
2012–2015	Racing Mechelen	23	(0)
2015–2019	VW Hamme		
2019–2020	K.S.V. Oudenaarde		
2020–2022	HSV Hoek		
- * Club domestic league appearances and goals

Griffin De Vroe (born 2 November 1984) is a Belgian former football goalkeeper. Early in his career he played for Belgian side Lokeren, saving a penalty in a league match in April 2007 after starting goalkeeper Jugoslav Lazić had been sent off. De Vroe moved to Standard Wetteren after the 2007–08 season. He finished his career with HSV Hoek in 2022, subsequently becoming goalkeeping coach at the same club.
