= Paratrooper =

Military parachutists functioning as part of an airborne operation

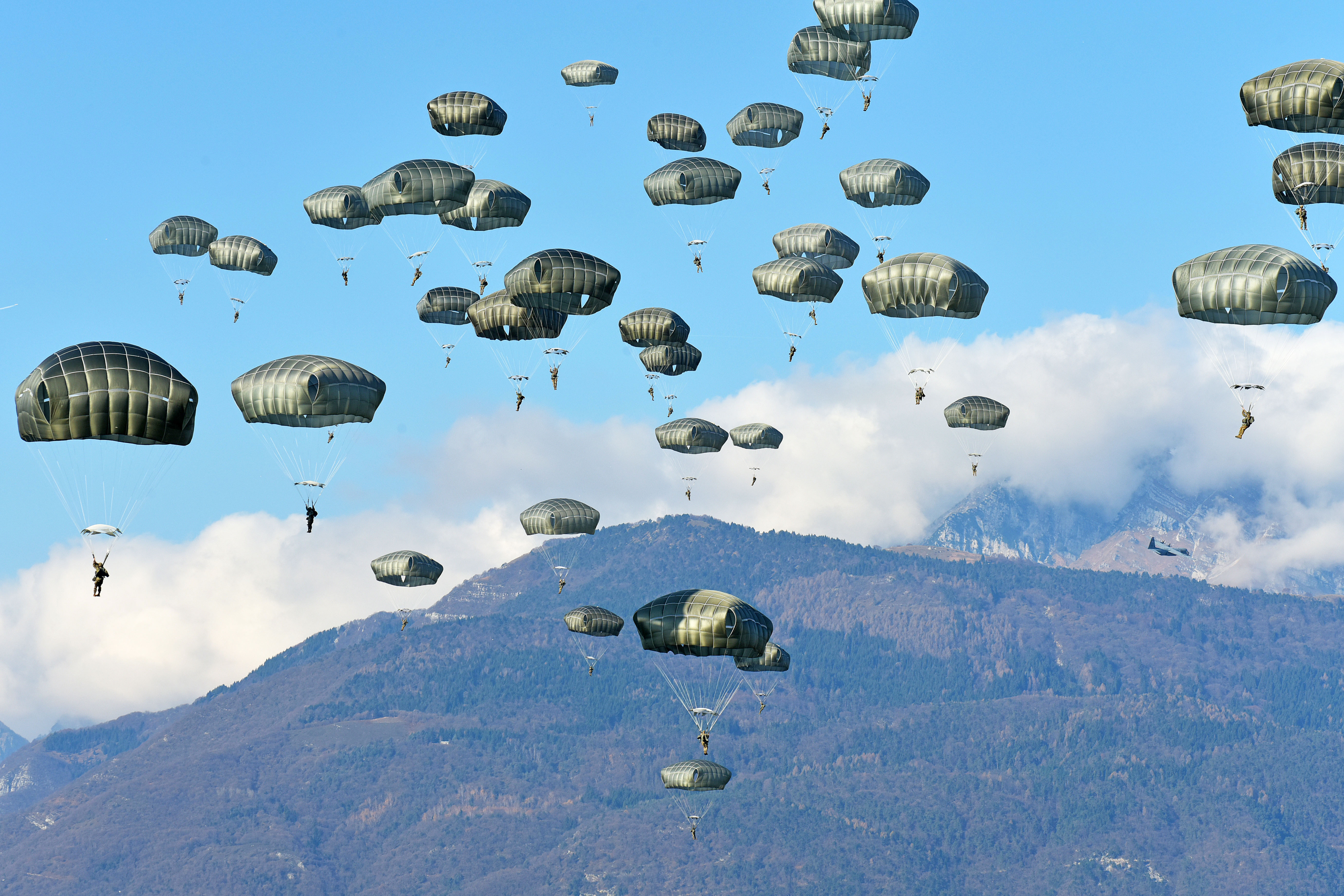
Paratroopers of the armies of Britain, Italy, Turkey and the United States during an exercise in Pordenone, Italy, 2019.

A paratrooper or military parachutist is a soldier trained to conduct military operations by parachuting directly into an area of operations, usually as part of a large airborne forces unit. Traditionally paratroopers fight only as light infantry armed with small arms and light weapons, although some paratroopers can also function as artillerymen or mechanized infantry by utilizing field guns, infantry fighting vehicles and light tanks that are often used in surprise attacks to seize strategic positions behind enemy lines such as airfields, bridges and major roads.

== Overview ==
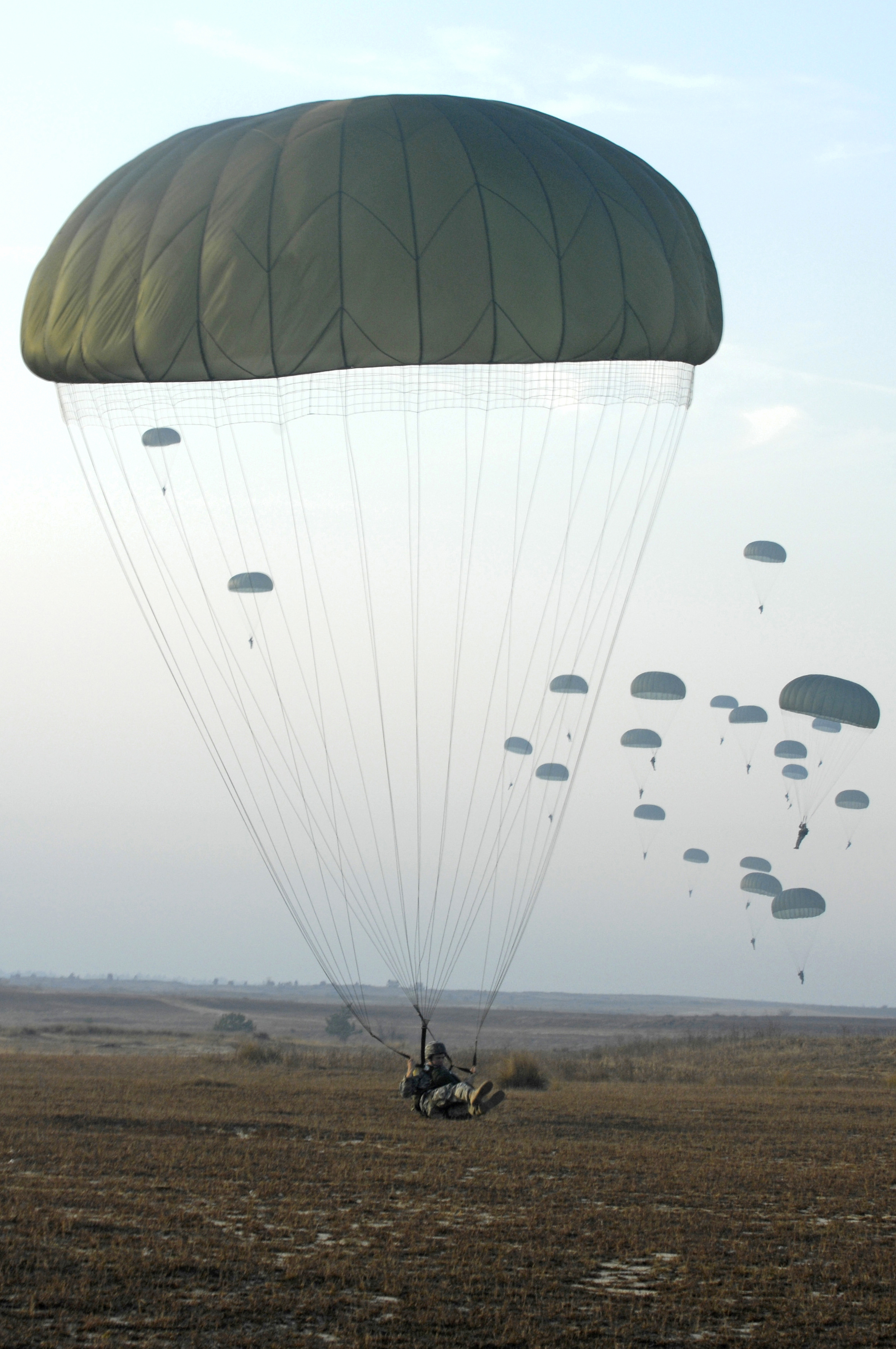
U.S. Army paratroopers with the 82nd Airborne Division parachute from a C-130 Hercules aircraft during Operation Toy Drop 2007 at Pope Air Force Base.

Paratroopers jump out of aircraft and use parachutes to land. This is one of the three types of "forced entry" strategic techniques for entering a theater of war; the other two being by land and by water. Their tactical advantage of entering the battlefield from the air is that they can attack areas not directly accessible by other transport. The ability of airborne assault to enter the battlefield from any location allows paratroopers to evade emplaced fortifications that guard from attack from a specific direction. The possible use of paratroopers also forces defenders to spread out to protect other areas which would otherwise be safe. Another common use for paratroopers is to establish an airhead for landing other units (as at the Battle of Crete).

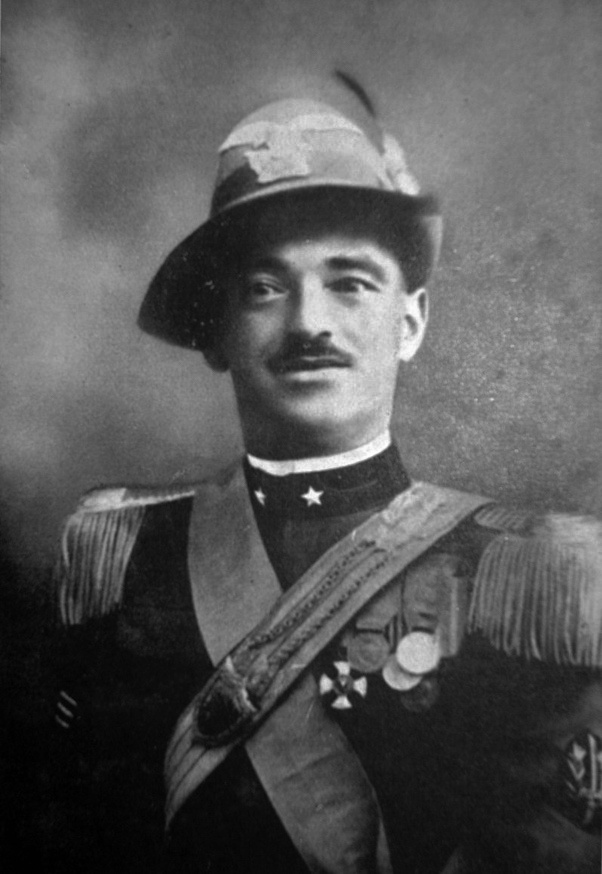
Alessandro Tandura

This doctrine was first practically applied in 1916 by the Imperial German Army, followed by the Royal Italian Army, in different theatres. The first airborne operation in military history was carried out by Maximilian von Cossel, then an Oberleutnant in the Prussian Army and his pilot, Rudolf Windisch, then a Vizefeldwebel in the Saxon Army. Windisch, flying a Roland Walfisch two-seater, landed in a wooded area behind the Russian front, after which Windisch returned to his base. During the night of October 2/3, 1916, Cossel blew up the Rowno–Brody (Rivne-Brody) railway line, 85 kilometers behind the eastern front, in several places. He was picked up by Windisch the following day. Their mission was mentioned by Ludendorff in the army report of October 4, 1916: "Cossel, who was set down from the plane southwest of Rowno by Vizefeldwebel Windisch and picked up again after 24 hours, interrupted the Rowno-Brody railway line at several points by means of explosives..." According to Russian reports, however, the tracks were only slightly damaged in one place, so that a train just passing them could continue its journey unhindered.

Italian troops made the second operational military parachute jump, from 490 metres (1,600 ft), on the night of August 8—9 1918. Arditi Lieutenant Alessandro Tandura jumped from a Savoia-Pomilio SP.4 aircraft of the Gruppo speciale Aviazione I piloted by Canadian Major William George Barker and British Captain William Wedgwood Benn (both Royal Air Force pilots), when Tandura dropped behind Austro-Hungarian lines near Vittorio Veneto on a reconnaissance and sabotage mission, followed on later nights by Lts. Ferruccio Nicoloso and Pier Arrigo Barnaba.

The first extensive use of paratroopers (Fallschirmjäger) was by the Germans during World War II. Later in the conflict paratroopers were used extensively by the Allied Forces. Cargo aircraft of the period (for example the German Junkers Ju 52 and the American Douglas C-47 Skytrain/Dakota) being small, they rarely, if ever, jumped in groups much larger than 20 from one aircraft. In English, this load of paratroopers is called a "stick," while any load of soldiers gathered for air movement is known as a "chalk." The terms come from the common use of white chalk on the sides of aircraft and vehicles to mark and update numbers of personnel and equipment being emplaned.

In World War II, paratroopers most often used parachutes of a circular design. These parachutes could be steered to a small degree by pulling on the risers (four straps connecting the paratrooper's harness to the connectors) and suspension lines which attach to the parachute canopy itself. German paratroopers, whose harnesses had only a single riser attached at the back, could not manipulate their parachutes in such a manner. Today, paratroopers still use round parachutes, or round parachutes modified so as to be more fully controlled with toggles. The parachutes are usually deployed by a static line. Mobility of the parachutes is often deliberately limited to prevent scattering of the troops when a large number parachute together.

Some military exhibition units and special forces units use "ram-air" parachutes, which offer a high degree of maneuverability and are deployed manually (without a static line) from the desired altitude. Some use high-altitude military parachuting, also deploying manually.

== Paratrooper forces around the world ==
Many countries have one or several paratrooper units, usually associated with the national Army or Air Force, but in some cases the Navy.

=== Argentina ===
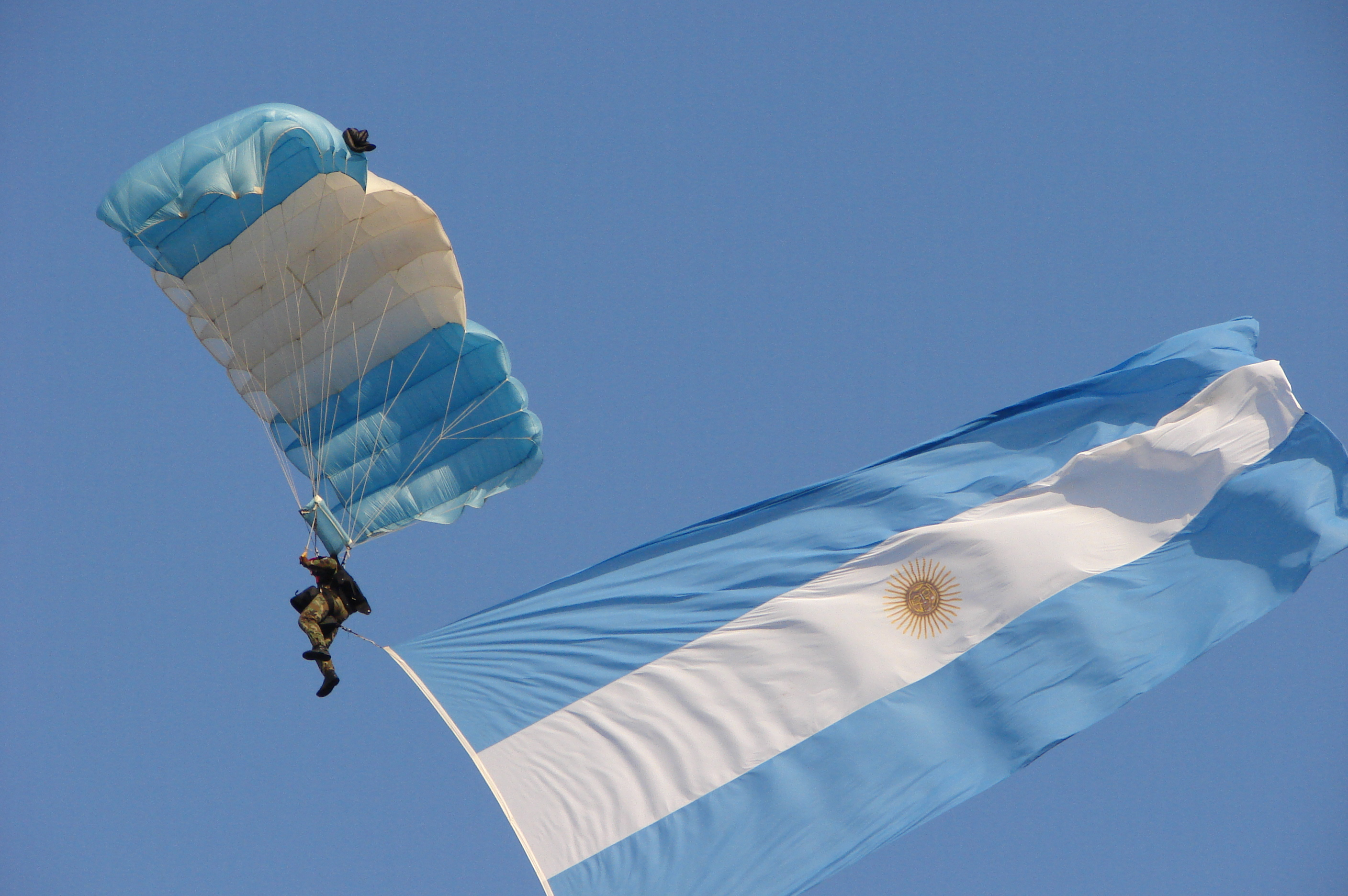
Military exhibition

In 1944, Argentina became the second country on the continent of South America to use Paratroopers, after Peru. The first paratroopers were issued jump helmets similar to that used by the British at the time, with other equipment based on the Fallschirmjäger. The 4th Parachute Brigade (4 Brigada Paracaidista) is a unit of the Argentine Army specialised in airborne assault operations. It is based in Córdoba, Córdoba Province. The Fuerza de Despliegue Rápido ("Rapid Deployment Force") is based on this unit. The members of the unit wear Red berets (Boina Rojas) of the paratroopers with unit badges. As of 2022 it consists of:

- 4th Airborne Brigade HQ (Córdoba)
- 2nd Paratroopers Regiment "General Balcarce" (Córdoba)
- 14th Paratroopers Regiment (Córdoba)
- 601st Air Assault Regiment (Campo de Mayo)
- 4th Paratrooper Artillery Group (Córdoba)
- 4th Paratrooper Cavalry Scout Squadron (Córdoba)
- 4th Paratrooper Engineer Company (Córdoba)
- 4th Paratrooper Signal Company (Córdoba)
- 4th Paratrooper Jump Support Company (Córdoba)
- Logistic & Support Base "Córdoba" (Córdoba)

=== Australia ===
Airborne forces raised by Australia have included a small number of conventional and special forces units. During the Second World War the Australian Army formed the 1st Parachute Battalion; however, it did not see action. In the post-war period Australia's parachute capability was primarily maintained by special forces units. In the 1970s and 1980s a parachute infantry capability was revived, while a Parachute Battalion Group based on the 3rd Battalion, Royal Australian Regiment (3 RAR) was established in 1983. However, following a reorganisation 3 RAR relinquished the parachute role in 2011, and this capability is now maintained by units of Special Operations Command.

=== France ===
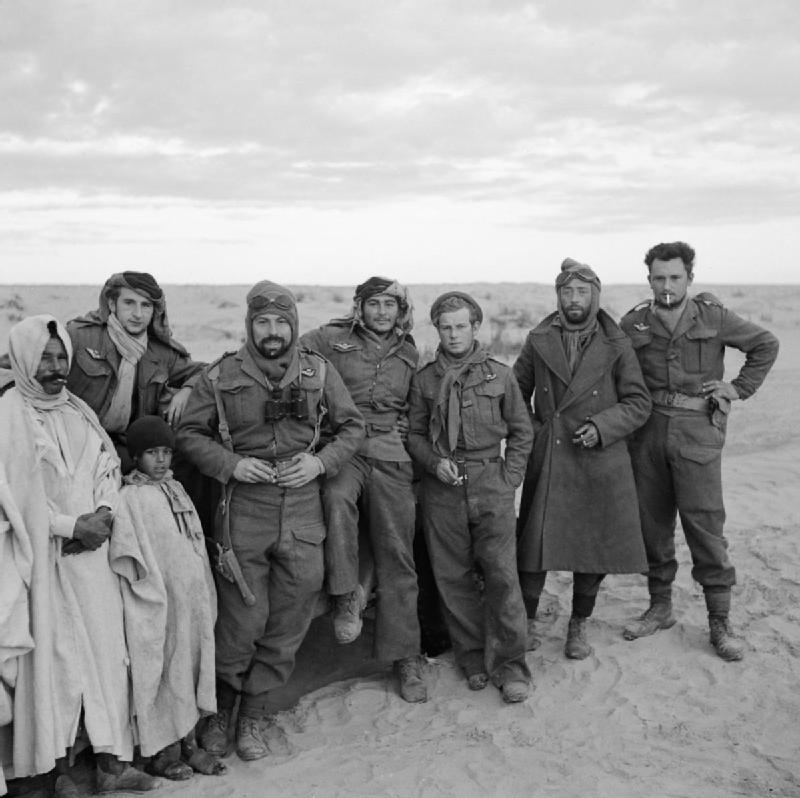
Members of the 1st Marine Infantry Parachute Regiment during the Second World War (Free French SAS)

Constant "Marin" Duclos was the first French soldier to execute a parachute jump on November 17, 1915. He performed 23 test and exhibition parachute drops without problems to publicise the system and overcome the prejudice aviators had for such life-saving equipment.

In 1935, Captain Geille of the French Air Force created the Avignon-Pujaut Paratroopers Schools after he trained in Moscow at the Soviet Airborne Academy. From this, the French military created two combat units called Groupes d’Infanterie de l’Air.

Following the Battle of France, General Charles de Gaulle formed the 1re Compagnie d’Infanterie de l’Air in September 1940 from members of the Free French forces who had escaped to Britain. It was transformed into the Compagnie de Chasseurs Parachutistes in October 1941. By June 1942, these units were fighting in Crete and Cyrenaica alongside the British 1st SAS Regiment. As part of the SAS Brigade, two independent French SAS units were also created in addition to the other French Airborne units. They operated until 1945.

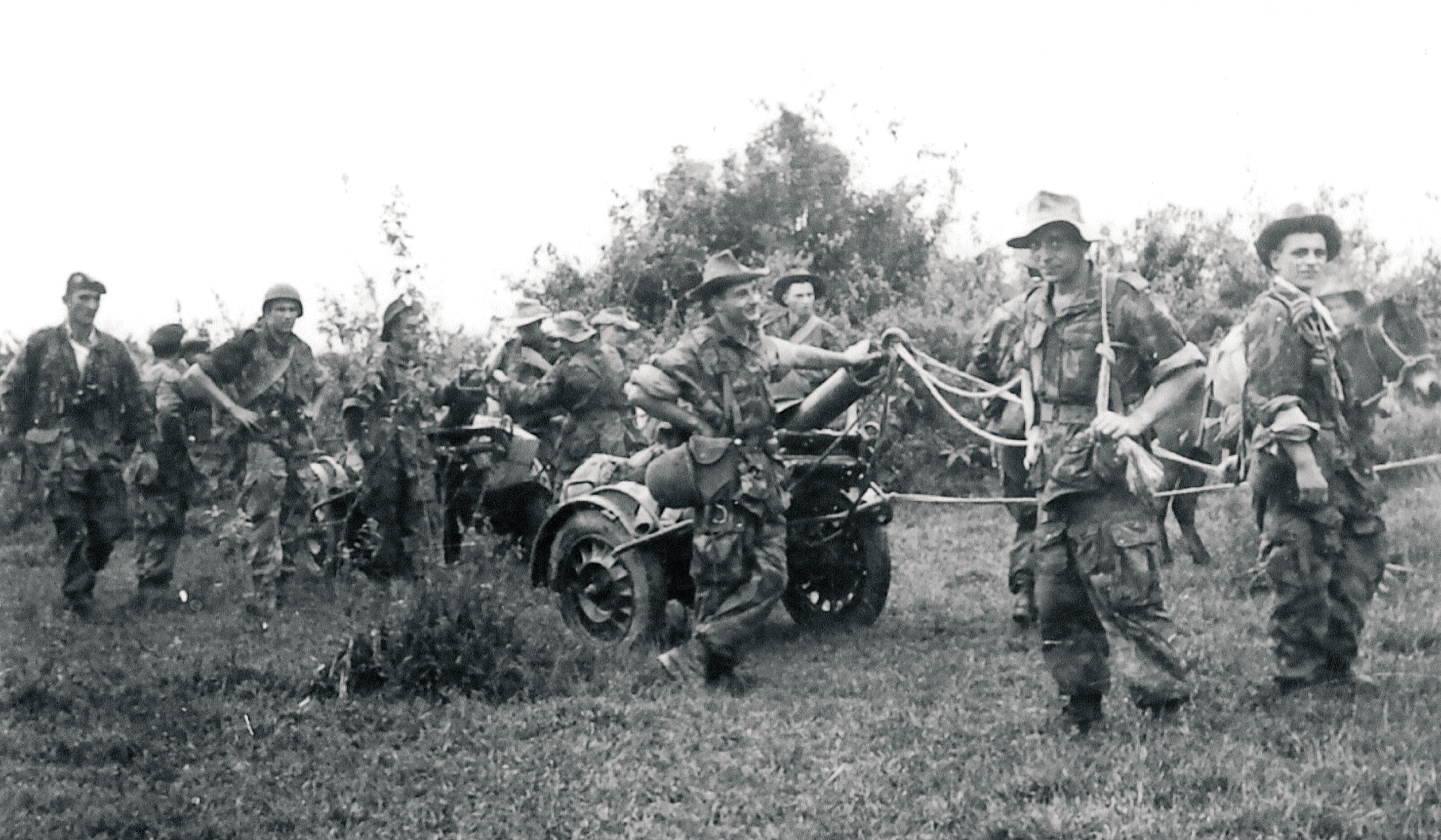
Members of the 1st Foreign Parachute Heavy Mortar Company in Indochina

In May 1943, the 1er Régiment de Chasseurs Parachutistes was created from the 601e Groupe d'Infanterie de l'Air in Morocco and the 3e and 4e Bataillons d'Infanterie de l'Air (BIA) in England in the Special Air Service. The 2e and 3e Régiments de Chasseurs Parachutistes followed in July 1944. During the Invasion of Normandy, French Airborne forces fought in Brittany, (Operation Dingson, Operation Samwest). The first Allied soldier to land in France was Free French SAS Captain Pierre Marienne who jumped into Brittany (Plumelec, Morbihan) on June 5 with 17 Free French paratroopers. The first Allied soldier killed in the liberation of France was Free French SAS Corporal Emile Bouétard of the 4e Bataillon d’Infanterie de l’Air, also in Brittany in Plumelec: June 6, 0 h 40. Captain Pierre Marienne was killed on July 12 in Plumelec. French SAS paratroopers also fought in the Loire Valley in September 1944, in Belgium on January, and in Netherlands in April 1945. The 1er Régiment Parachutiste de Choc carried out operations in Provence.

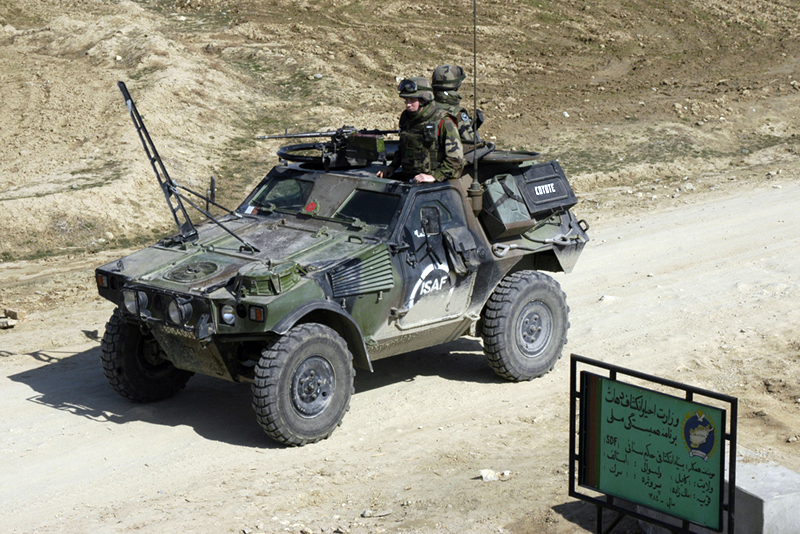
VBL (armoured light vehicle) of the 1st Parachute Hussar Regiment in Afghanistan

After World War II, the post-war French military of the Fourth Republic created several new airborne units. Among them were the Bataillon de Parachutistes Coloniaux (BPC) based in Vannes-Meucon, the Metropolitan Paratroopers, and the Colonial Paratroopers and Bataillons Étrangers de Parachutistes (French Foreign Legion), which coexisted until 1954. During the First Indochina War, a Bataillon Parachutiste Viet Nam was created (BPVN) in southeast Asia. In total, 150 different airborne operations took place in Indochina between 1945 and 1954. These included five major combat missions against the Viet Minh strongholds and areas of concentration.

When the French left Vietnam in 1954, all airborne battalions were upgraded to regiments over the next two years. Only the French Air Force's Commandos de l'Air (Air Force) were excluded. In 1956, the 2e Régiment de Parachutiste Coloniaux took part in the Suez Crisis.

Next, the French Army regrouped all its Army Airborne regiments into two parachute divisions in 1956. The 10th parachute division (10e Division Parachutiste, 10e DP) came under the command of General Jacques Massu and General Henri Sauvagnac took over the 25th Parachute Division (25e Division Parachutiste, 25e DP). Again the Commandos de l'Air were kept under command of the Air Force.

By the late 1950s, in Algeria, the FLN had launched its War of Independence. French paratroopers were used as counter insurgency units by the French Army. This was the first time in airborne operations troops used helicopters for air assault and fire support.

But in the aftermath of the Algiers putsch, the 10e and 25e Parachute divisions were disbanded and their regiments merged into the Light Intervention Division (Division Légère d'Intervention). This division became the 11th Parachute Division (11e Division Parachutiste, 11e DP) in 1971.

In the aftermath of the Cold War, the French Army reorganised and the 11e DP become the 11th Parachute Brigade in 1999.

=== Germany ===
The first known airborne commando operation in military history was conducted by Maximilian Hermann Richard Paschen von Cossel, then Leutnant of the Royal Prussian Army and his new pilot, then Royal Saxon Vice Sergeant Rudolf Windisch. Windisch flew the Roland Walfisch used for this purpose and set Cossel down in a wooded area behind the Russian front. During the night of October 2/3, 1916, Cossel blew up the Rowno–Brody railway line, 85 kilometers behind the eastern front, in several places. This was acknowledged in the army report of October 4, 1916: Eastern theater of war: ... Oberleutnant v. Cossel, who was set down from the plane southwest of Rowno by Vice Sergeant Windisch and picked up again after 24 hours, interrupted the Rowno-Brody railway line at several points by means of explosives. ... The First Quartermaster General. Ludendorff. According to Russian reports, however, the tracks were only slightly damaged in one place, so that a train just passing them could continue its journey unhindered.

Nazi Germany's Luftwaffe Fallschirmjäger units made the first airborne invasion when invading Denmark on April 9, 1940, as part of Operation Weserübung. In the early morning hours they attacked and took control of the Masnedø fort and Aalborg Airport. The Masnedø fort was positioned such as it guarded the Storstrøm Bridge between the islands of Falster and Masnedø – on the main road from the south to Copenhagen. Aalborg Airport played a key role acting as a refueling station for the Luftwaffe in the further invasion into Norway. In the same assault the bridges around Aalborg were taken. Fallschirmjäger were also used in the Low Countries against the Netherlands, although their use against The Hague was unsuccessful. Their most famous drop was the 1941 Battle of Crete, though they suffered large casualties.

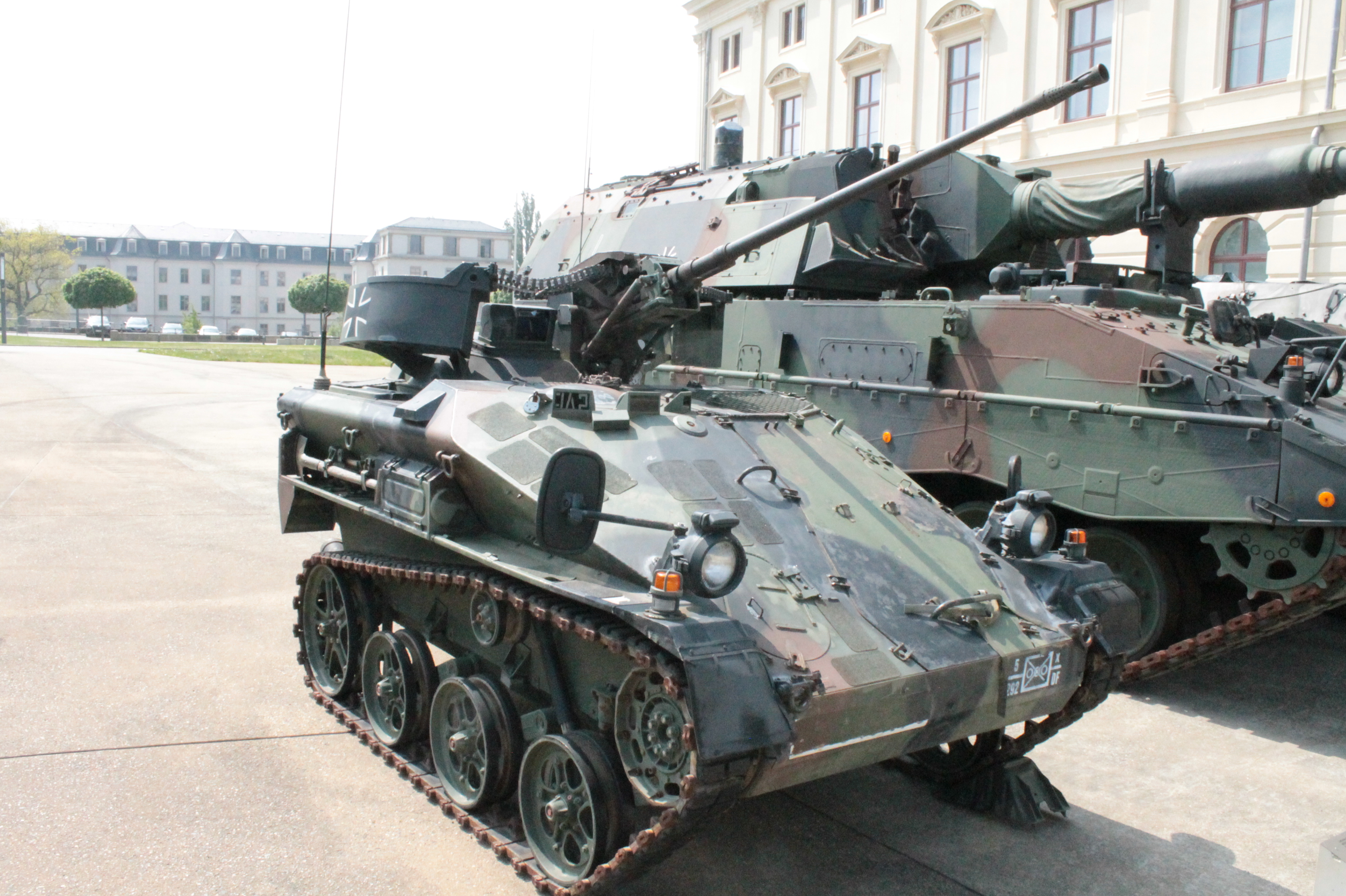
Wiesel 1 MK20 (1991) of the Bundeswehr Fallschirmjägertruppe in the Military History Museum, Dresden

Hence later in the war, the 7th Air Division's Fallschirmjäger assets were re-organised and used as the core of a new series of elite Luftwaffe Infantry divisions, numbered in a series beginning with the 1st Fallschirmjäger Division. These formations were organised and equipped as motorised infantry divisions, and often played a "fire brigade" role on the western front. Their constituents were often encountered on the battlefield as ad hoc battle groups (Kampfgruppen) detached from a division or organised from miscellaneous available assets. In accord with standard German practice, these were called by their commander's name, such as Group Erdmann in France and the Ramcke Parachute Brigade in North Africa.

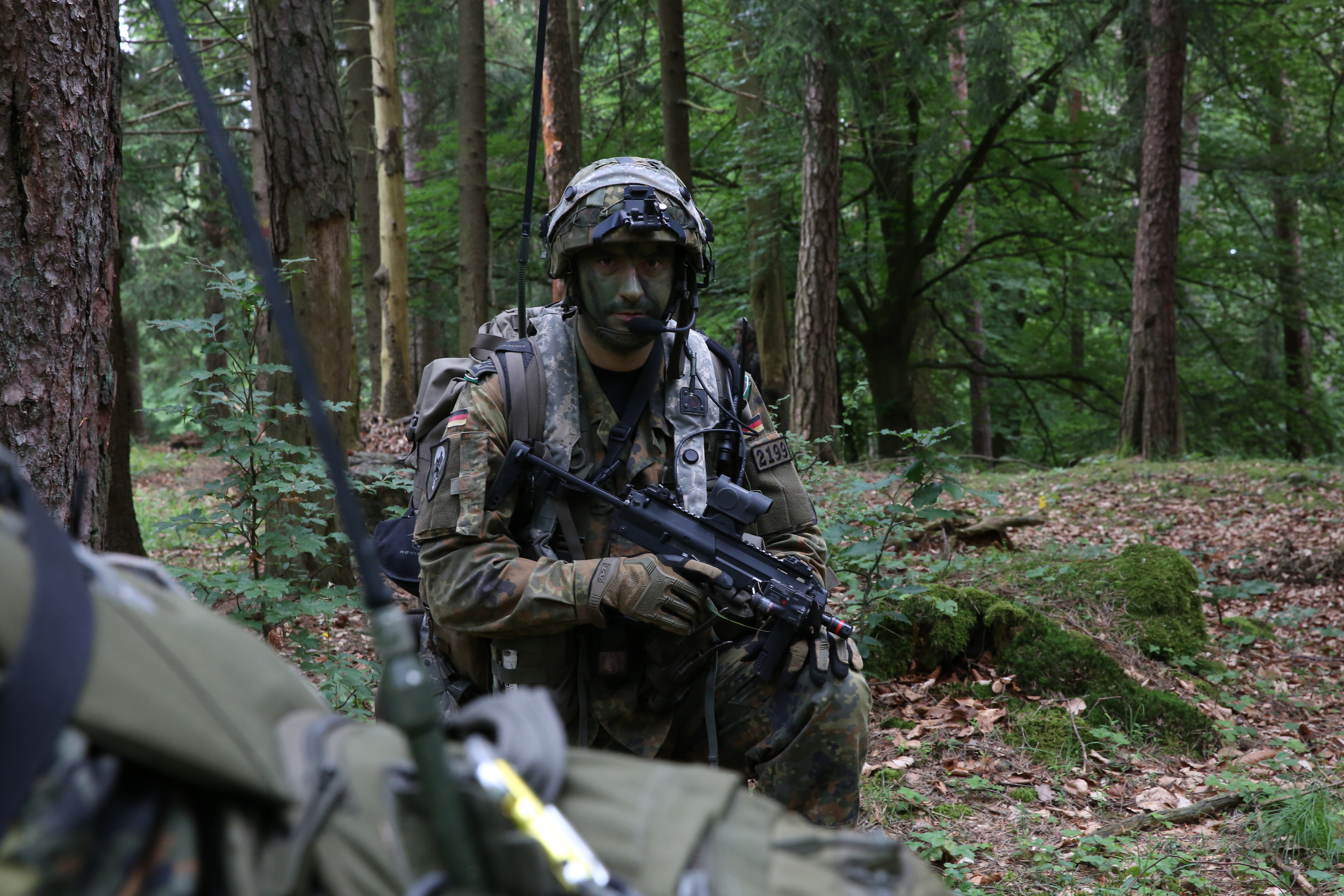
A German Bundeswehr soldier of 4th Paratrooper Company, 31st Paratrooper Regiment in 2016

After mid-1944, Fallschirmjäger were no longer trained as paratroops owing to the realities of the strategic situation, but retained the Fallschirmjäger honorific. Near the end of the war, the series of new Fallschirmjäger divisions extended to over a dozen, with a concomitant reduction in quality in the higher-numbered units of the series. Among these divisions was the 9th Fallschirmjäger Division, which was the final parachute division to be raised by Germany during World War II. The Russian army destroyed the division during the Battle of Berlin in April 1945. The Fallschirmjäger were issued specialist weapons such as the FG 42 and specially designed helmets.

In the modern German Bundeswehr, the Fallschirmjägertruppe continue to form the core of special operations units. The division has two brigade equivalents and several independent companies and battalions. All told, about 10,000 troops served in that division in 2010, most of them support or logistics personnel. The Fallschirmjägertruppe currently uses the Wiesel Armoured Weapons Carrier (AWC), a light air-transportable armoured fighting vehicle, more specifically a lightly armoured weapons carrier. It is quite similar to historical scouting tankettes in size, form and function, and is the only true modern tankette in use in Western Europe.

=== India ===
The Parachute Regiment is the Special Forces/airborne regiment of the Indian Army. The Regiment was formed in 1952

The regiment has a total of 14 regular, one Rashtriya Rifles and two Territorial Army (India) battalions; of the regular bns, five are Airborne battalions, while nine are Special Forces battalions. Formerly designated "Commando" units, they are now designated Special Forces:

Three of the Special Forces battalions were originally trained for use in certain environments; 1st Bn [strategic reserve], 9th Bn [mountain] and 10th Bn [desert]. Subsequently, the 21st Bn was raised for jungle warfare. Currently, all Special Forces battalions are cross trained for all environments.

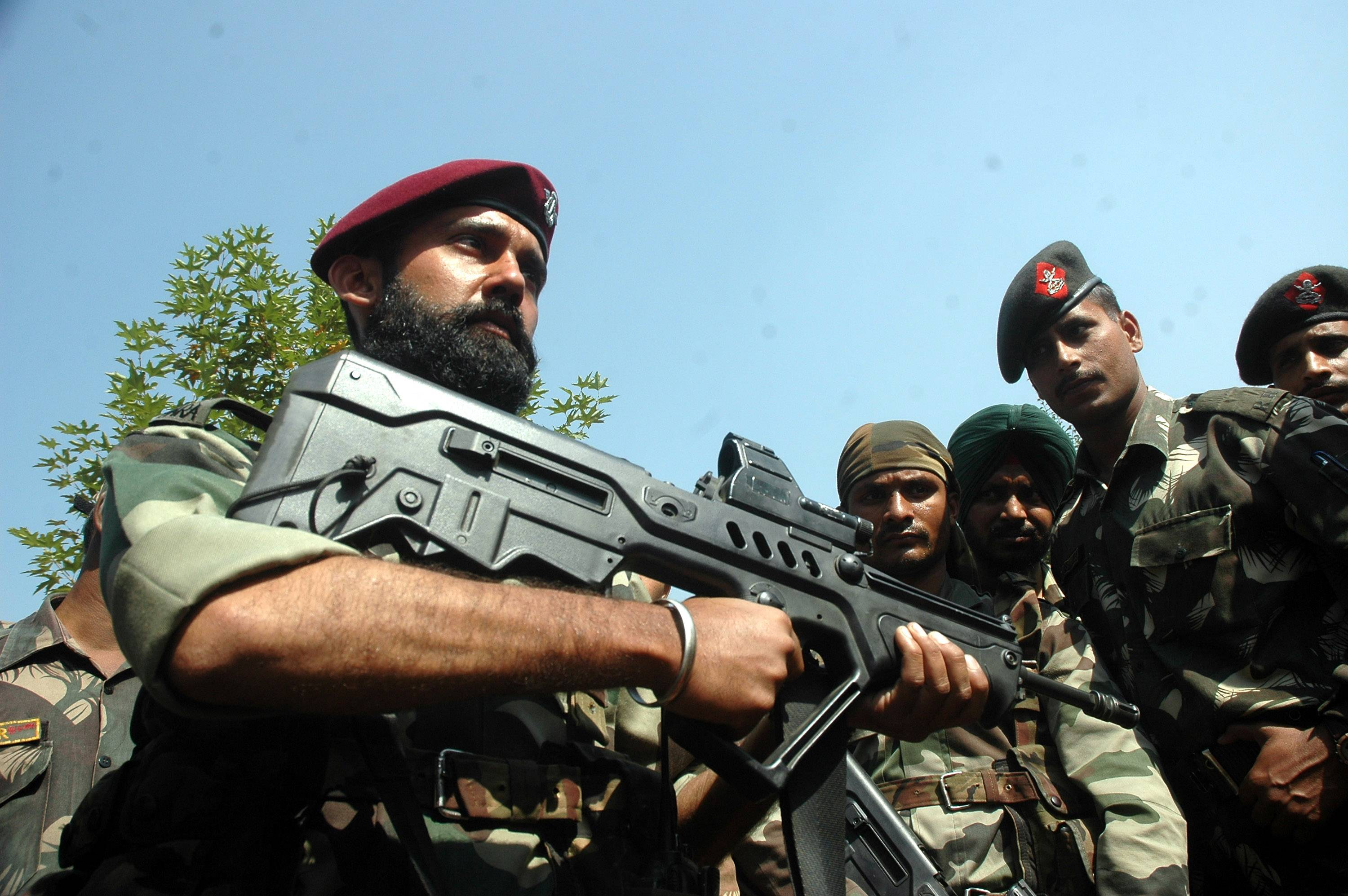
Elite soldiers of Indian Army's 9 Para Commandos

The 8th Battalion became 16th Battalion, Mahar Regiment in 1976 before reconverting to the 12th Battalion, Mechanised Infantry Regiment. A sizable part of the battalion was retained in the airborne role for some time, forming the armoured element of the 50th (Independent) Parachute Brigade and equipped with their BMP-2 Infantry Combat Vehicles. But due to administrative and logistic reasons, it was discontinued and their role being taken over by the para battalions themselves, with a platoon strength of each battalion being trained and equipped for the mechanized role within the brigade.

The 50th (Independent) Parachute Brigade comprises the following units:

- 03 Airborne battalions
- 01 Parachute Field Regiment (Artillery) (9 & 17 Parachute Field Regiments in rotation)
- 60 Parachute Field Hospital
- 411 (Independent) Parachute Field Company (Bombay Sappers)
- 622 Parachute Composite Company (ASC)
- 50th (Independent) Parachute Brigade OFP (Ordnance)
- 50th (Independent) Parachute Brigade Signal Company
- 2 (Independent) Parachute Field Workshop Company (EME)
- 252 (Para) Air Defence Battery

( 50th (Independent) Parachute Brigade Provost Section.

The President's Body Guard also forms part of the brigade as the pathfinders company.

Three Airborne units in rotation form part of the Parachute Brigade alternatively serving their field tenures in counter-insurgency/high altitude areas. One of the two field regiments (9 Para Fd Regt and 17 Para Fd Regt) also forms part of the brigade while the other serves out its field tenure on rotation.

The two Territorial Army battalions, 106th (Bangalore) and 116th (Deolali) form the airborne element of the Terriers (as the Territorial Army is popularly known) and are presently involved in COIN operations.

31st Battalion (Commando), Rashtriya Rifles, is also affiliated to the Parachute Regiment, for special operations conducted by the counter-insurgency force.

=== Israel ===
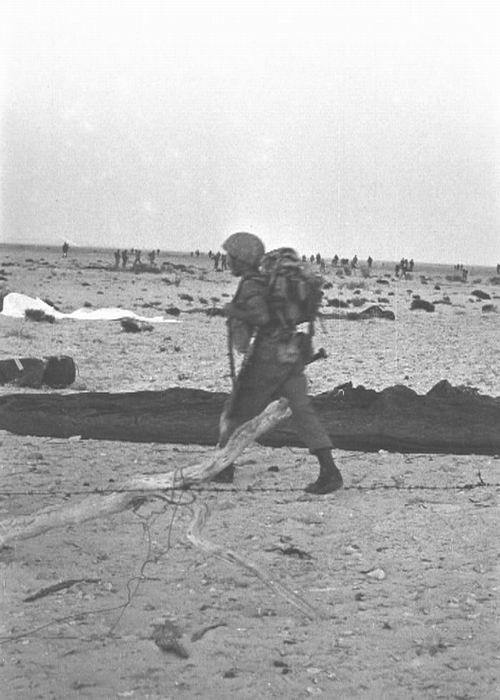
IDF Paratrooper at the Mitla Pass, 1956

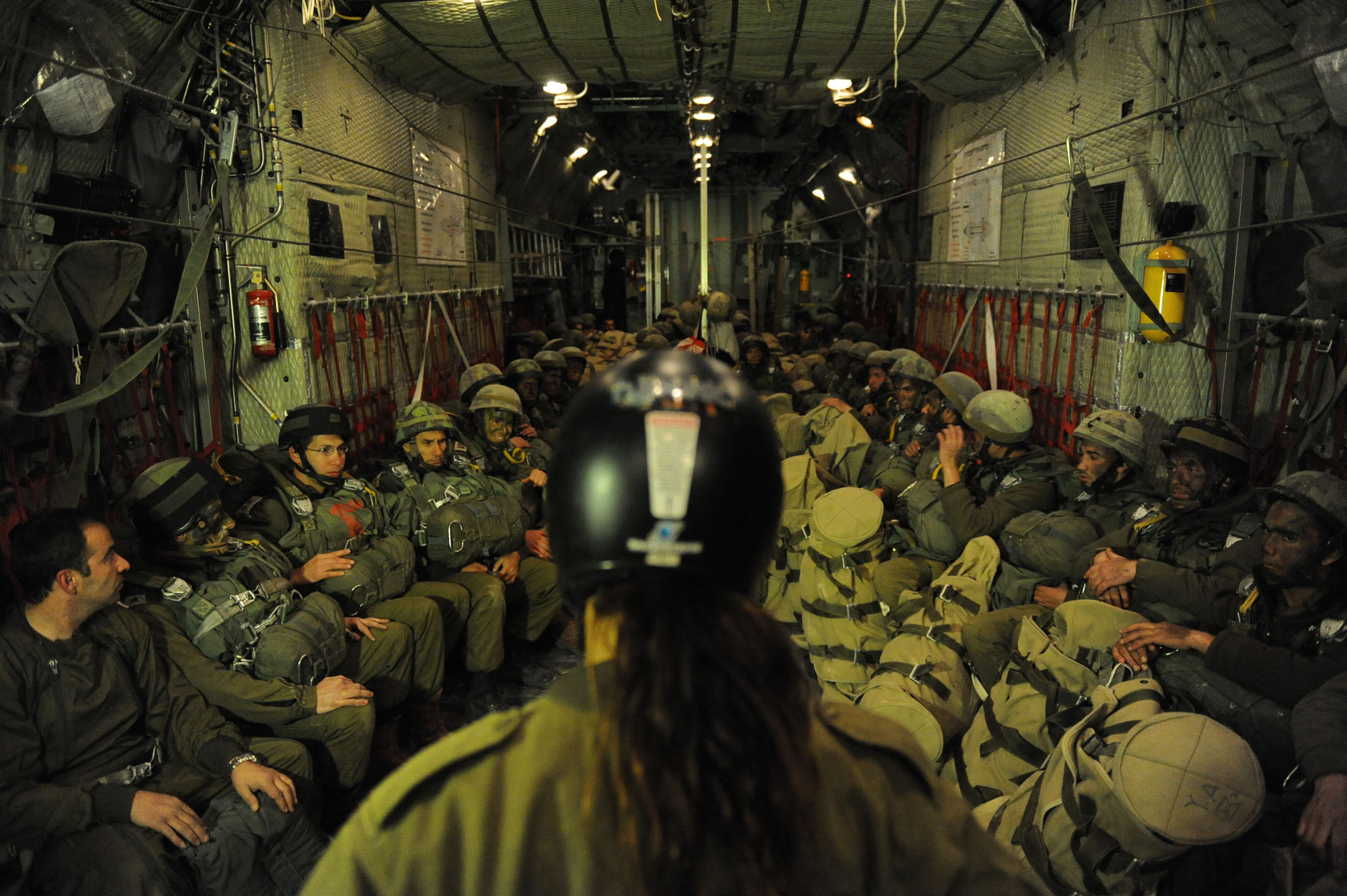
IDF's 35th Brigade during training

Israel Defense Forces (IDF) paratroopers have a history of carrying out special forces-style missions dating back to the 1950s. In 1956 the IDF conducted a large paratroop drop at the Mitla Pass, as part of Operation Kadesh.

Paratrooper Brigade soldiers wear maroon berets with the infantry pin and reddish-brown boots. Distinct from all other soldiers of the IDF, Paratroopers wear a tunic and belt over the shirt. The IDF has one active paratrooper brigade and four reserve brigades consisting of personnel who served their mandatory time in the 35th brigade, and who are mostly relatively recently discharged, aside from officers. The IDF paratrooper brigades include:

- 35th Paratroopers Brigade - Has been active since 1955 and is part of Central Command
- 55th Paratroopers Brigade (Reserve)
- 226th Paratroopers Brigade (Reserve)
- 551st Paratroopers Brigade (Reserve)
- 646th Paratroopers Brigade (Reserve)

=== Italy ===
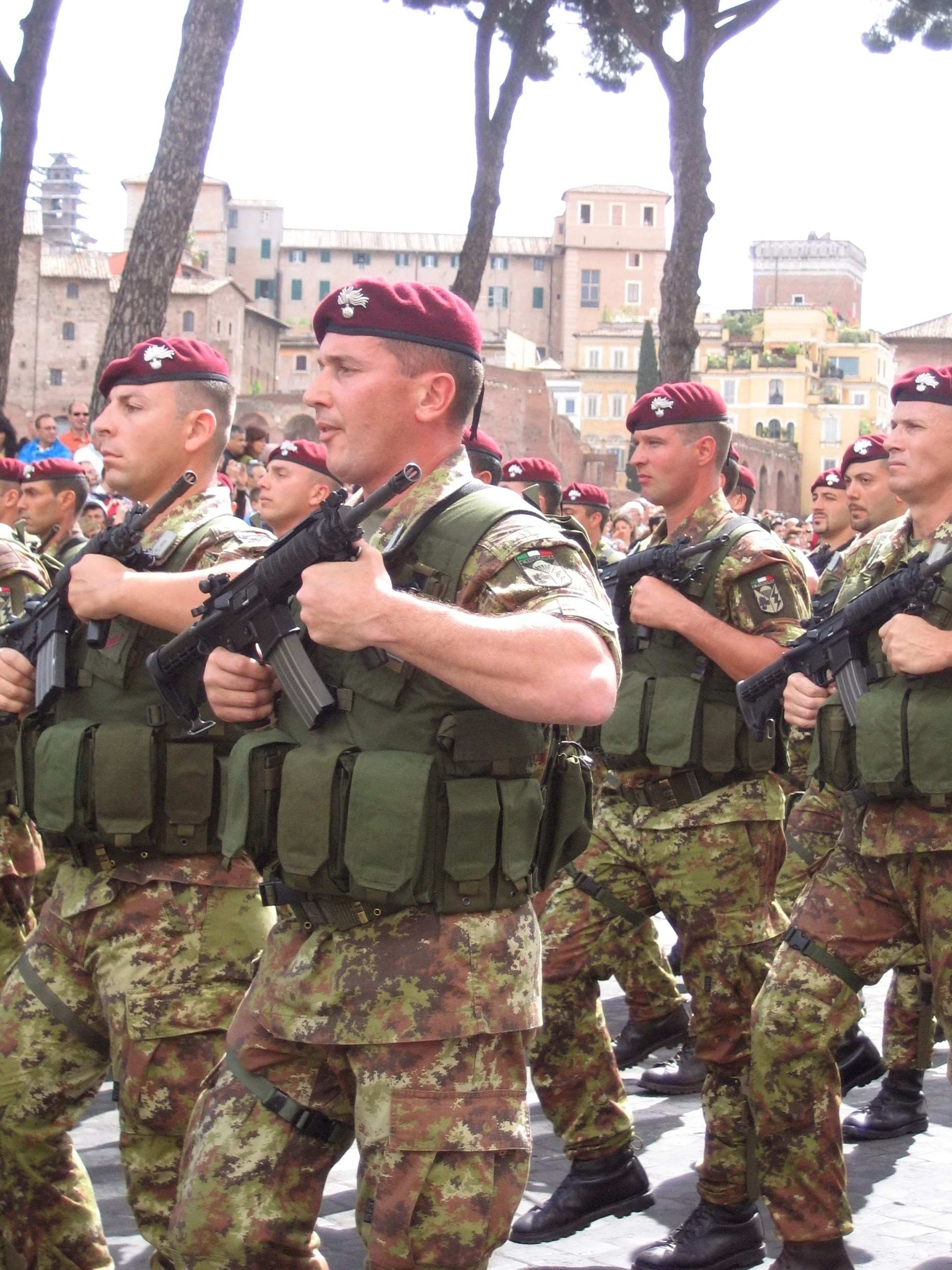
Italian paratroopers of the Carabinieri Regiment "Tuscania"

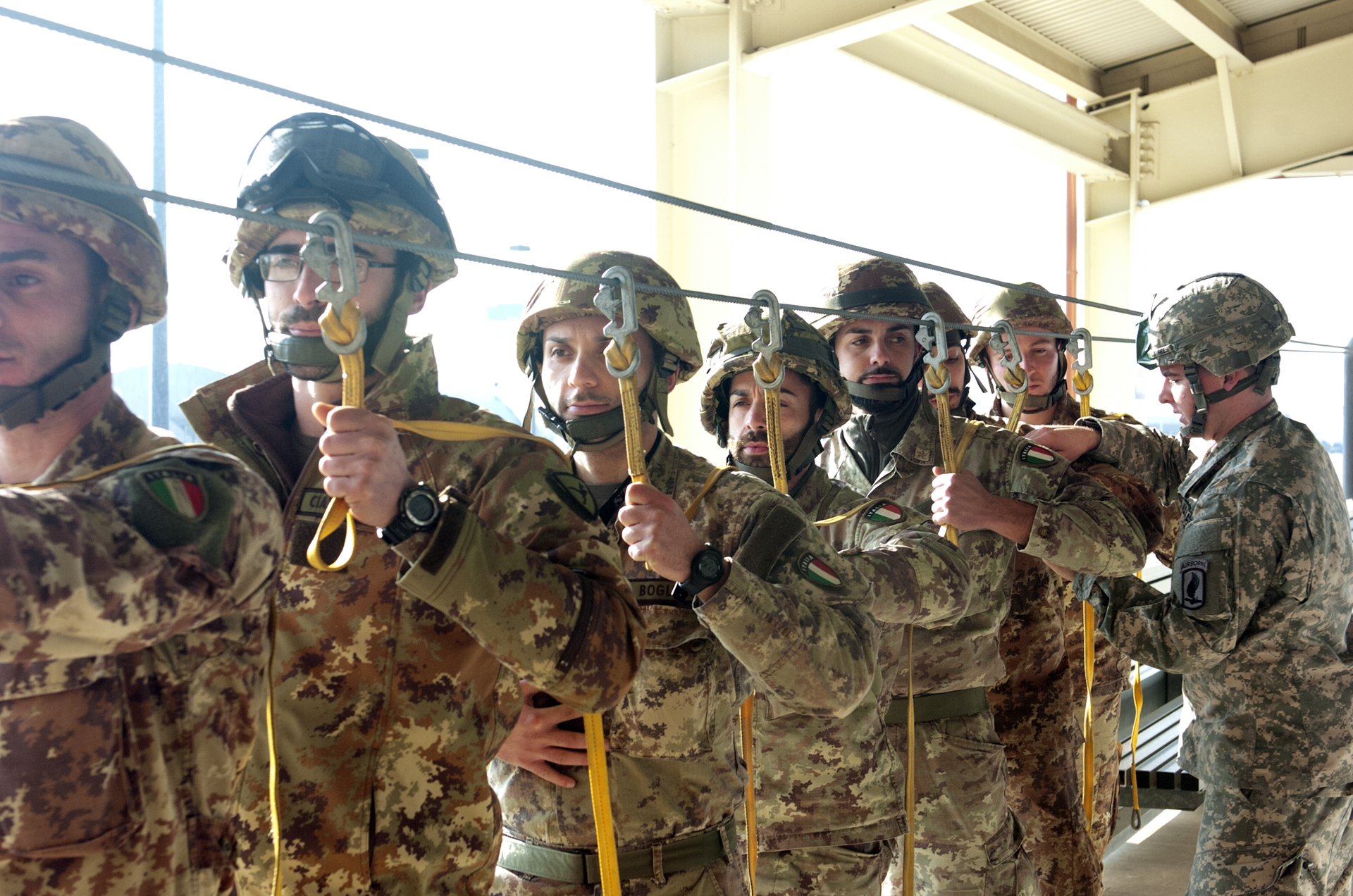
Paratroopers of the Paratroopers Brigade "Folgore"

The first units of Italian parachutists were trained and formed shortly before the Second World War in Castel Benito, near Tripoli (Libya), where the first Military school of Parachuting was located. They were two native battalions of the Royal Libyan Troops Corps and two battalions of Italian troops, later joined by the Carabinieri Paratroopers Battalion.

Moved back to Italy in 1941, the staff of the Castel Benito school was expanded into the Paratroopers School at Tarquinia and became a massive training program. In 1941, a Parachutist division was completed and was designated the 185th Infantry Division "Folgore". It was trained for the assault on Malta but was used instead in ground combat operations in the North African Campaign, where it fought with great distinction during the Second battle of El Alamein, effectively stalling the southern part of the Commonwealth attack until the general retreat of the Axis forces, when it was destroyed.

Another major paratroopers division was formed during 1942 (the 184th Infantry Division "Nembo") and a third had started forming in 1943 (the 184th Parachute Division "Ciclone"). After the September 8th 1943 Armistice, elements of the "Nembo" division joined the Allies against the germans as part of the Italian Liberation Corps (Corpo Italiano di Liberazione) and later as part of the Combat Group "Folgore" (Gruppo di Combattimento "Folgore") of the Italian Co-belligerent Army. Other scattered elements joined the Italian Social Republic, where they formed several Parachute units that continued to operate alongside the Germans against the Allies, fighting with distinction during the Battle of Anzio.

After WW2, the Italian Army conscripted the Paratroopers Brigade "Folgore", currently the largest unit of paratroopers of the Italian Army. The Brigade operates as Light Infantry with airborne drop and air transport capability with secondary light mechanized capabilities, as part of the "Vittorio Veneto" Division, the on-call divisional HQ controlling the rapid reaction components of the Italian Army.

In 1982 the Paratroopers Brigade "Folgore" landed in Beirut with the Multinational Force in Lebanon. In 1991, a Parachutist Tactical group was deployed to Kurdistan. Its mission was to provide humanitarian aid. From July 1992, the Brigade supplied personnel to the "Vespri Siciliani" and later "Strade Sicure" internal security operations. The Folgore participated in Operation Restore Hope in Somalia from 3 December 1992 to September 1993. Parts of the Brigade have been employed many times in the Balkans (IFOR/SFOR in Bosnia and KFOR in Kosovo), with MNF in Albania and INTERFET in East Timor. The Folgore participated from August 2005 to September 2005 in Operation Babylon in Iraq and to December 2014 in Afghanistan. In August 2007, the Folgore took part in United Nations Interim Force in Lebanon, under aegis of the United Nations (Resolution 1701), as a result of the war between Israel and Hezbollah of summer 2006. The Paratroopers Brigade "Folgore" is still mainly deployed abroad in international stabilization and peacekeeping operation, on rotation with the other elite units of the Italian Army.

Other paratroopers units operate as part of the Army Special Forces Command and of the other Special Forces components provided by the Navy, Air Force and Carabinieri.

=== Japan ===
Teishin Shudan (挺進集団, Raiding Group) was a Japanese special forces/airborne unit during World War II. The unit was a division-level force, and was part of the Imperial Japanese Army Air Force (IJAAF).

It was commanded by a major general, and was organized as follows:

- Headquarters company (220 personnel)
- Aviation brigade
- Raiding brigade
- Two glider infantry regiments
- Raiding artillery company (120 personnel)
- Raiding signals company (140 personnel)
- Raiding engineer company (250 personnel)

Notably, Japanese troopers fought in the Battle of Palembang and in the takeover of Celebes in the Dutch East Indies.

The 1st Airborne Brigade (Japanese: 第1空挺団, Dai-Ichi Kūtei Dan), established in 1958 is the Japan Ground Self-Defense Force's elite airborne unit meant for anti-guerilla and commando operations. The unit is currently used for homeland defense and international combat operations as part of the JGSDF’s Ground Component Command (Japanese: 陸上総隊).

=== Peru ===
During the Ecuadorian–Peruvian War, the Peruvian army had also established its own paratrooper unit and used it to great effect by seizing the Ecuadorian port city of Puerto Bolívar, on July 31, 1941, marking the first time in the Americas that airborne troops were used in combat.

In 1965, a paratrooper unit known as the Sinchis was established under the Civil Guard as a counterinsurgency and anti-narcotics force. With the dissolution of the Civil Guard in 1991, the unit became part of the National Police of Peru.

=== Poland ===
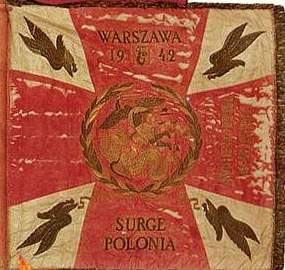
Polish paratrooper standard

The 1st (Polish) Independent Parachute Brigade was a parachute brigade under the command of Major General Stanisław Sosabowski, created during the Second World War in Scotland in September 1941, with the exclusive mission to drop into occupied Poland in order to help liberate the country. The British government, however, pressured the Poles into allowing the unit to be used in the Western theatre of war. Operation Market Garden eventually saw the unit sent into action in support of the British 1st Airborne Division at the Battle of Arnhem in 1944. The Poles were initially landed by glider from 18 September, whilst, due to bad weather over England, the parachute section of the Brigade was held up, and jumped on 21 September at Driel on the South bank of the Rhine. The Poles suffered significant casualties during the next few days of fighting, but still were able, by their presence, to cause around 2,500 German troops to be diverted to deal with them for fear of them supporting the remnants of 1st Airborne trapped over the lower Rhine in Oosterbeek.

The Brigade was originally trained close to RAF Ringway and later in Upper Largo in Scotland. It was finally based in Lincolnshire, close to RAF Spitalgate (Grantham) where it continued training until its eventual departure for Europe after D-Day.

The Brigade was formed by the Polish High Command in exile with the aim of it being used to support the Polish resistance during the nationwide uprising, a plan that encountered opposition from the British, who argued they would not be able to support it properly. The pressure of the British government eventually caused the Poles to give in and agree to let the Brigade be used on the Western Front. On 6 June 1944 the unit, originally the only Polish unit directly subordinate to the Polish government in exile and thus independent of the British command, was transferred into the same command structure as all other Polish Forces in the West. It was slotted to take part in several operations after the invasion of Normandy, but all of them were cancelled. On 27 July, aware of the imminent Warsaw Uprising, the Polish government in exile asked the British government for air support, including dropping the Brigade in the vicinity of Warsaw. This request was refused on the grounds of "operational considerations" and the "difficulties" in coordinating with the Soviet forces. Eventually, the Brigade entered combat when it was dropped during Operation Market Garden in September 1944.

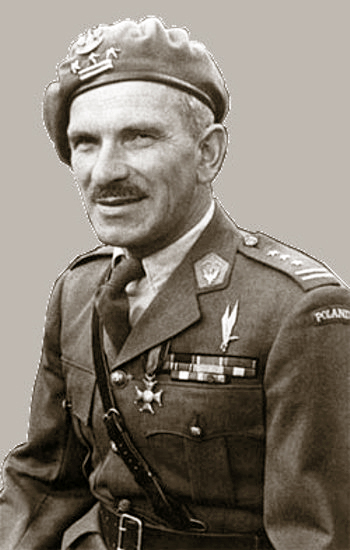
Stanisław Sosabowski, the brigade's commander

During the operation, the Brigade's anti-tank battery went into Arnhem on the third day of the battle (19 September), supporting the British paratroopers at Oosterbeek. This left Sosabowski without any anti-tank capability. The light artillery battery was left behind in England due to a shortage of gliders. Owing to bad weather and a shortage of transport planes, the drop into Driel was delayed by two days, to 21 September. The British units which were supposed to cover the landing zone were in a bad situation and out of radio contact with the main Allied forces. Finally, the 2nd Battalion, and elements of the 3rd Battalion, with support troops from the Brigade's Medical Company, Engineer Company and HQ Company, were dropped under German fire east of Driel. They overran Driel, after it was realised that the Heveadorp ferry had been destroyed. In Driel, the Polish paratroopers set up a defensive "hedgehog" position, from which over the next two nights further attempts were made to cross the Rhine.

The following day, the Poles were able to produce some makeshift boats and attempt a crossing. With great difficulty and under German fire from the heights of Westerbouwing on the north bank of the river, the 8th Parachute Company and, later, additional troops from 3rd Battalion, managed to cross the Rhine in two attempts. In total, about 200 Polish paratroopers made it across in two days, and were able to cover the subsequent withdrawal of the remnants of the British 1st Airborne Division.

On 26 September 1944, the Brigade (now including the 1st Battalion and elements of the 3rd Battalion, who were parachuted near to Grave on 23 September) was ordered to march towards Nijmegen. The Brigade had lost 25% of its fighting strength, amounting to 590 casualties.

In 1945, the Brigade was attached to the Polish 1st Armoured Division and undertook occupation duties in Northern Germany until it was disbanded on 30 June 1947. The majority of its soldiers chose to stay in exile rather than hazard returning to the new Communist Poland.

=== Portugal ===
The first Portuguese paratroopers were part of a small commando unit, organized in Australia, during World War II, with the objective to be dropped in the rearguard of the Japanese troops that were occupying Portuguese Timor.

However, the first regular parachute unit was only created in 1955, by the Portuguese Air Force, as the Parachute Caçadores Battalion. This unit adopted the green beret, which has become, since then, the principal emblem of the Portuguese paratroopers. The Battalion was expanded to a Regiment and additional parachute battalions were created in the Portuguese overseas territories of Angola, Mozambique and Guinea. These units were actively engaged in the Portuguese Colonial War, from 1961 to 1975, being involved both in airborne and air assault operations. In addition to the regular units of paratroopers, in Mozambique were also created the Parachute Special Groups, composed of African irregular troops who wore a maroon beret.

With the end of the Colonial War, the Portuguese parachute troops were reorganized as the Paratroopers Corps, with the Light Parachute Brigade as its operational unit. In 1993, the Paratroopers Corps was transferred from the Portuguese Air Force to the Portuguese Army and become the Airborne Troops Command, with the Independent Airborne Brigade as its operational unit.

The reorganization of the Portuguese Army in 2006 caused the extinction of the Airborne Troops Command. The Independent Airborne Brigade was transformed in the present Rapid Reaction Brigade, which now includes not only parachute troops but also special operations and commando troops.

=== Russia ===
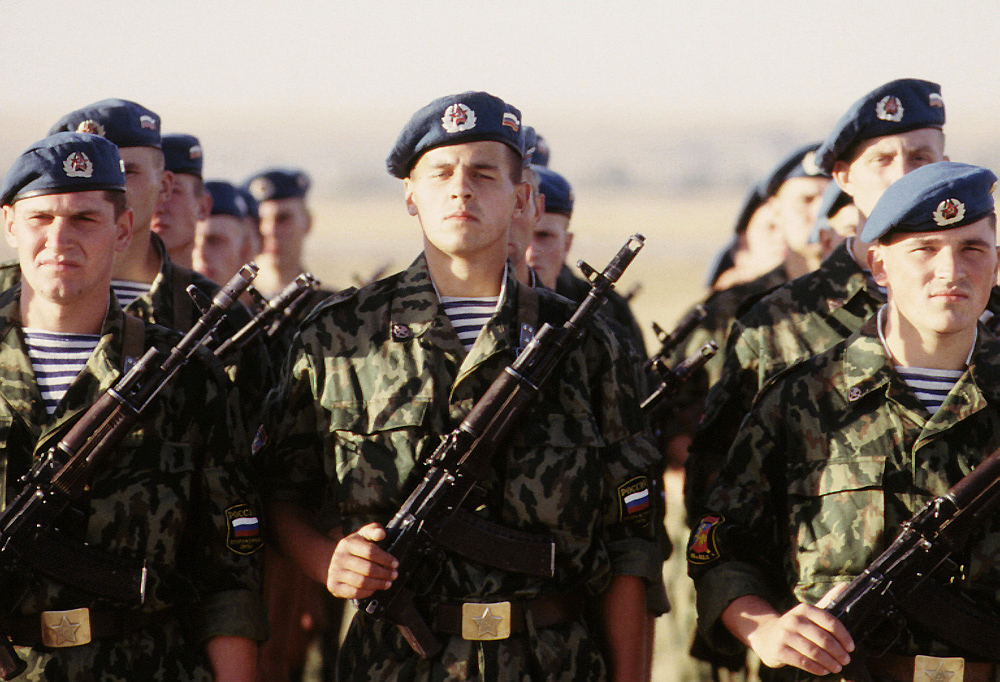
Russian paratroopers

Soviet Airborne Forces were first formed in the Soviet Union during the mid-1930s and were the first regular paratrooper units in the world. They were massively expanded during World War II, forming ten Airborne Corps plus numerous Independent Airborne Brigades, with most or all achieving Guards status. The 9th Guards Army was eventually formed with three Guards Rifle Corps (37,38,39) of Airborne divisions. One of the new units was the 100th Airborne Division. At the end of the war they were reconstituted as Guards Rifle Divisions. They were later rebuilt during the Cold War, eventually forming seven Airborne Divisions, an Independent Airborne regiment and sixteen Air Assault Brigades. These divisions were formed into their own VDV commands (Vozdushno-Desantnye Voyska) to give the Soviets a rapid strike force to spearhead strategic military operations.

Following the collapse of the Soviet Union, there has been a reduction in airborne divisions. Three VDV divisions have been disbanded, as well as one brigade and a brigade-sized training centre. Nevertheless, Russian Airborne Troops are still the largest in the world.

VDV troops participated in the rapid deployment of Russian forces in and around Pristina Airport during the Kosovo War. They were also deployed in Chechnya as an active bridgehead for other forces to follow.

=== Turkey ===
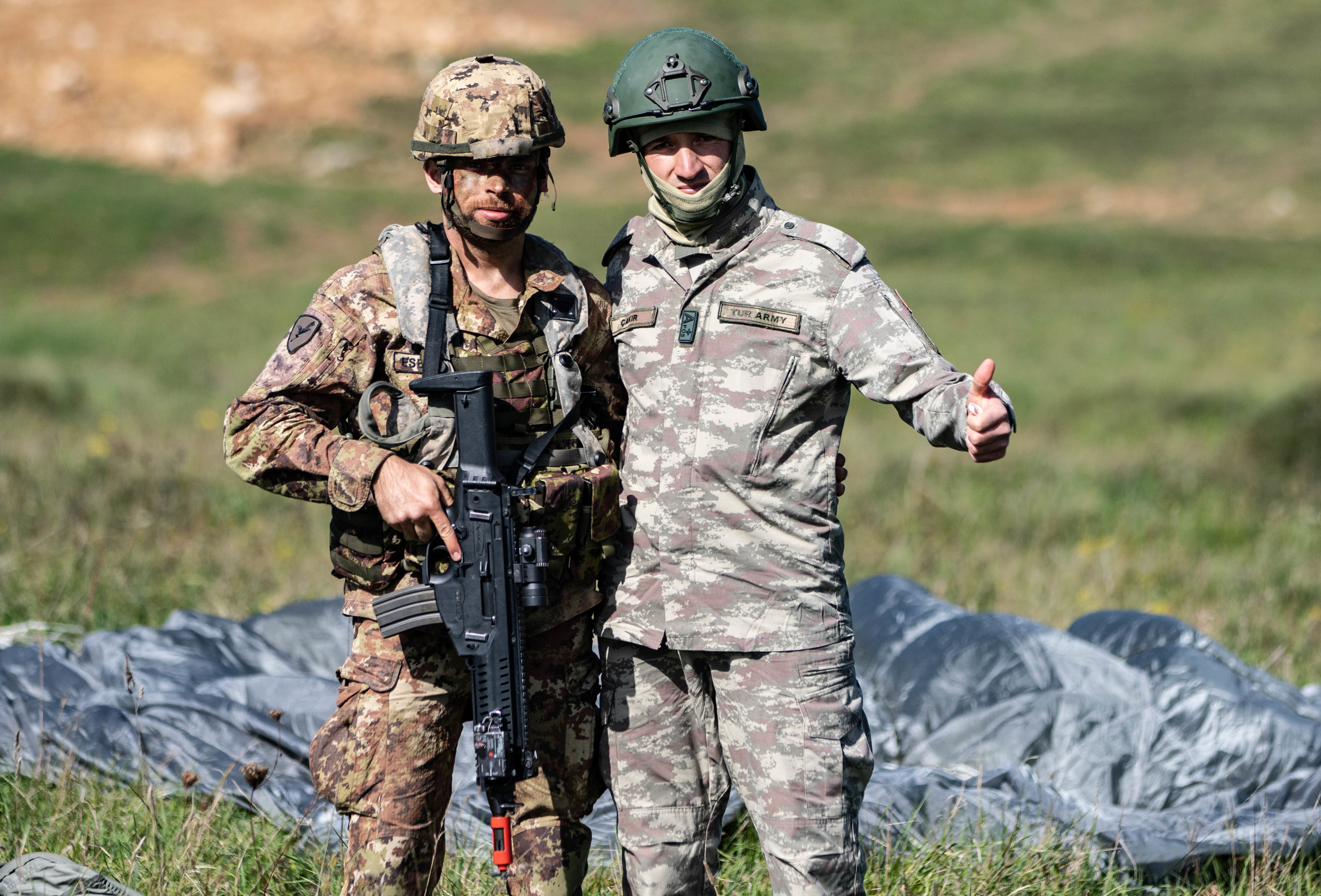
Paratroopers from the Italian Army and the Turkish Land Forces during Saber Junction 19

The Turkish Paratrooper Commando Battalion (Türk Paraşütçü Komando Tugayı) are an elite military unit within the Turkish Land Forces, established in 1952 under NATO's influence as part of a broader effort to modernize and professionalize the Turkish military. This highly trained unit specializes in airborne operations, special warfare, and rapid deployment in combat situations. The unit played a significant role in the Cyprus War of 1974, where Turkish forces intervened in response to a Greek-led coup and the subsequent threat to the Turkish Cypriot population. Paratrooper Commandos were among the first to land on the island during the initial stages of Turkey's military intervention, executing strategic airborne assaults that were crucial in securing key areas.

=== Ukraine ===
The Ukrainian Air Assault Forces (abbreviated as DShV or AAFU), known until 2017 as the Ukrainian Airmobile Forces are the airborne forces of Ukraine. After the Dissolution of the Soviet Union in 1991, several Ukraine-based units from the Soviet Airborne Forces were absorbed into the newly created Ukrainian Ground Forces, where they remained until 2016, when they separated to become one of five branches of the Armed Forces of Ukraine. The Air Assault Forces are in constant combat readiness. They are the high-mobility branch of the military, responsible for air assaults and military parachuting operations. Before the Russo-Ukrainian War they were also the main forces sent by Ukraine to peacekeeping missions around the world. They are considered the elite of Ukraine's armed forces.

=== United Kingdom ===
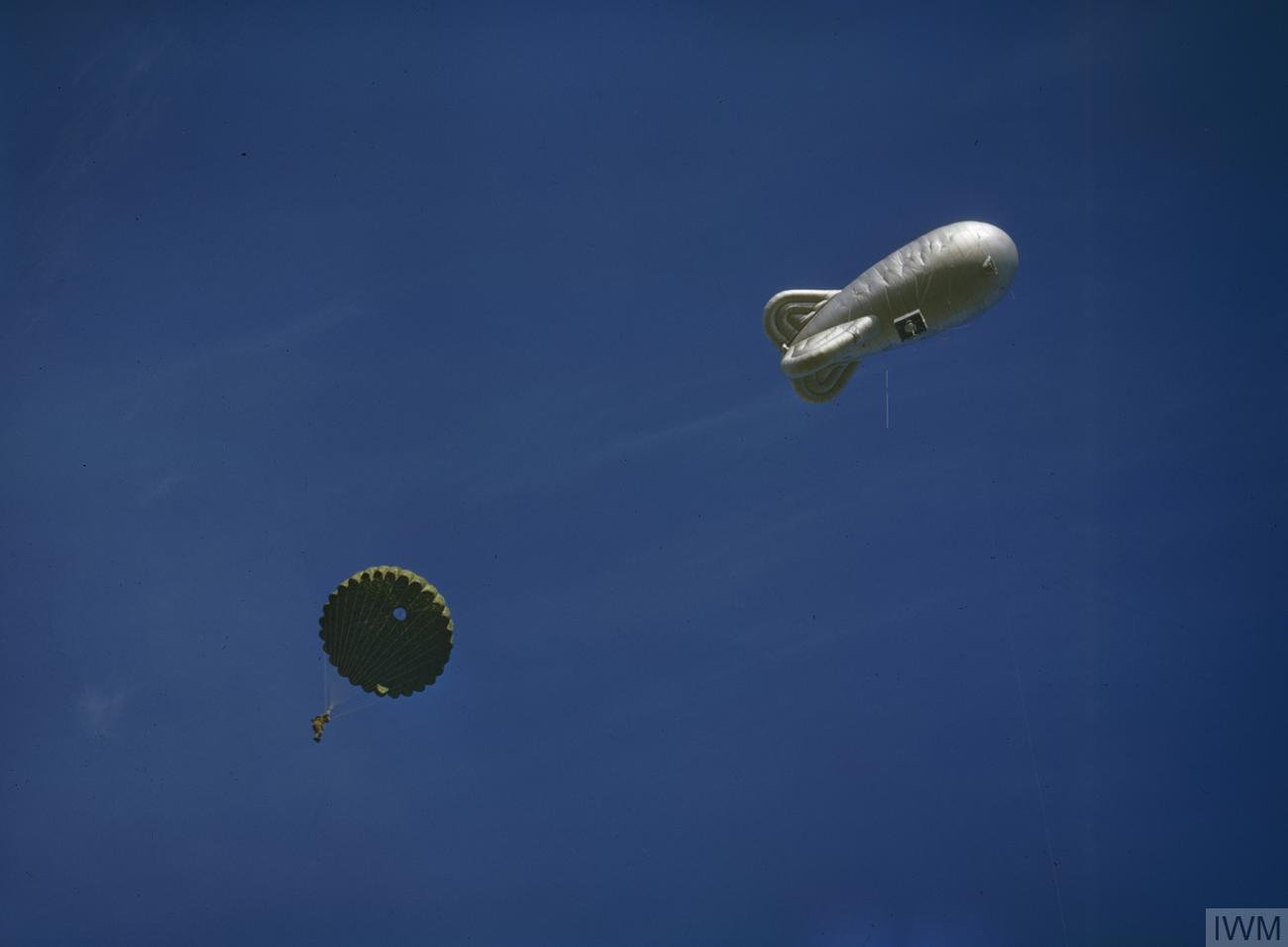
Paratroops making training drops from a tethered barrage balloon, October 1942

The Parachute Regiment has its origins in the elite force of Commandos set up by the British Army at the request of Winston Churchill, the Prime Minister, during the initial phase of the Second World War. Churchill had been an enthusiast of the concept of airborne warfare since the First World War, when he had proposed the creation of a force that might assault the German flanks deep behind the trenches of the static Western Front. In 1940 and in the aftermath of the Dunkirk evacuation and the Fall of France, Churchill's interest was caught again by the idea of taking the fight back to Europe – the airborne was now a means "to be able to storm a series of water obstacles... everywhere from the Channel to the Mediterranean and in the East".

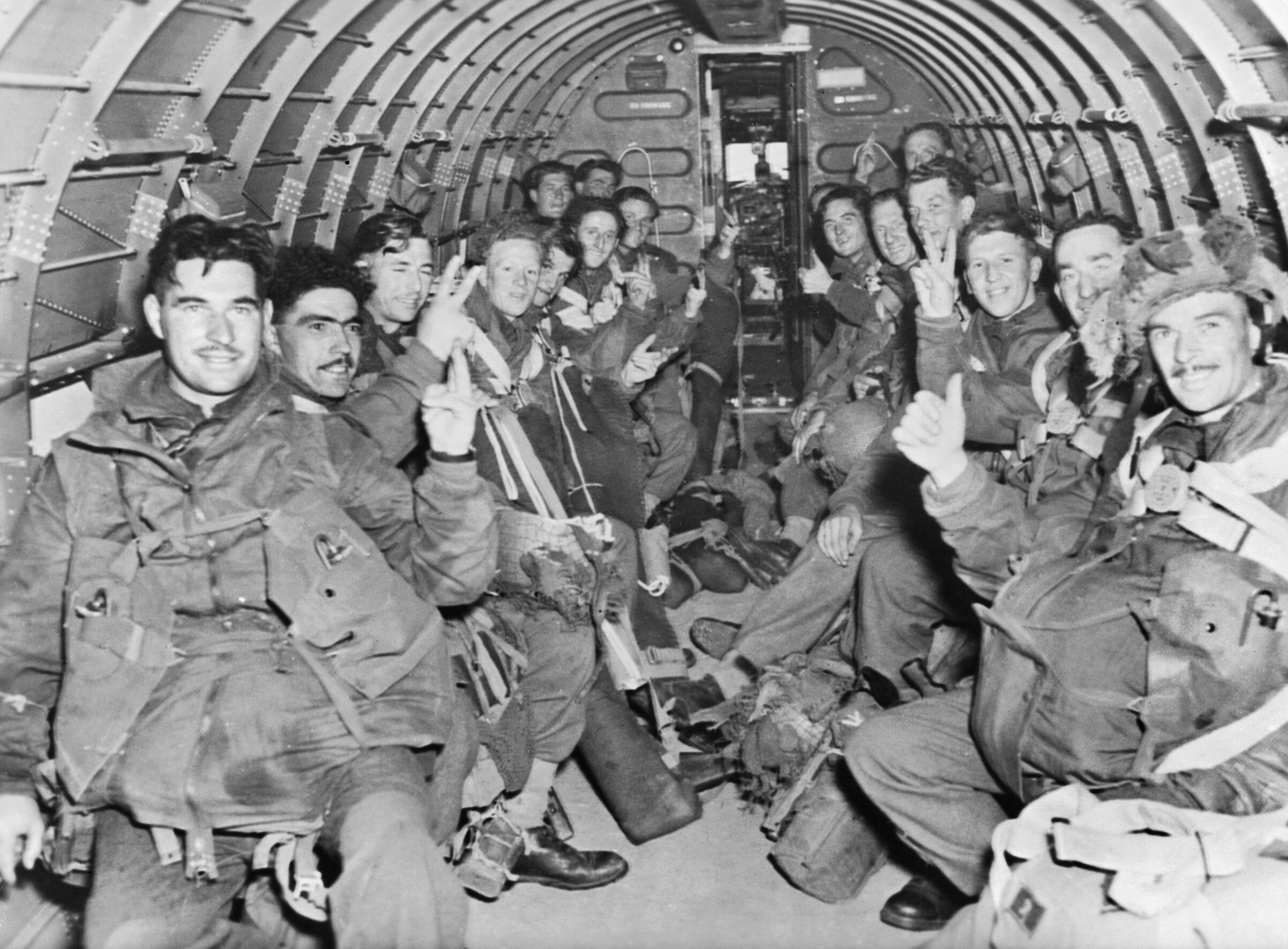
British paratroopers inside one of the C-47 transport aircraft, September 1944

Enthusiasts within the British armed forces were inspired in the creation of airborne forces (including the Parachute Regiment, Air Landing Regiment, and the Glider Pilot Regiment) by the example of the German Luftwaffe's Fallschirmjäger, which had a major role in the invasions of Norway, and the Low Countries, particularly the attack on Fort Eben-Emael in Belgium, and a pivotal, but costly role in the invasion of Crete. From the perspective of others, however, the proposed airborne units had a key weakness: they required exactly the same resources as the new strategic bomber capability, another high priority, and would also compete with the badly stretched strategic air lift capability, essential to Churchill's strategy in the Far East. It took the continued reintervention of Churchill to ensure that sufficient aircraft were devoted to the airborne project to make it viable.

Britain's first airborne assault took place on February 10, 1941, when, what was then known as II Special Air Service (some 37 men of 500 trained in No. 2 Commando plus three Italian interpreters), parachuted into Italy to blow up an aqueduct in a daring raid named Operation Colossus. After the Battle of Crete, it was agreed that Britain would need many more paratroopers for similar operations. No 2 Commando were tasked with specialising in airborne assault and became the nucleus of the Parachute Regiment, becoming the 1st Battalion. The larger scale drops in Sicily by the 1st Airborne Division in 1943 met with mixed success, and some commanders concluded the airborne experiment was a failure. Once again, it took the reintervention of senior British political leaders, looking ahead to the potential needs of the invasion of France, to continue the growth in British airborne resources.

Extensive successful drops were made during the Normandy landings by the 6th Airborne Division (see Operation Tonga), under the command of Major-General Richard Nelson Gale, but Operation Market Garden to seize a corridor across the Netherlands as far as Arnhem with the 1st Airborne Division under Roy Urquhart were less successful, and proved, in the famous phrase, to be A Bridge too far and the 1st Airborne was virtually destroyed. Later large scale drops, such as those on the Rhine under Operation Varsity and involving the British 6th and the US 17th, were successful, but less ambitious in their intent to seize ground. After the war, there was fierce debate within the cash-strapped British armed forces as to the value of airborne forces. Many noted the unique contribution they had made within the campaign. Others pointed to the extreme costs involved and the need for strict prioritisation. During the debate, the contribution of British airborne forces in the Far Eastern theatres was perhaps underplayed, to the long term detriment of the argument.

Several parachute squadrons of the Royal Air Force Regiment were formed in World War II in order to secure airfields for the RAF – this capability is currently operated by II Squadron.

=== United States ===
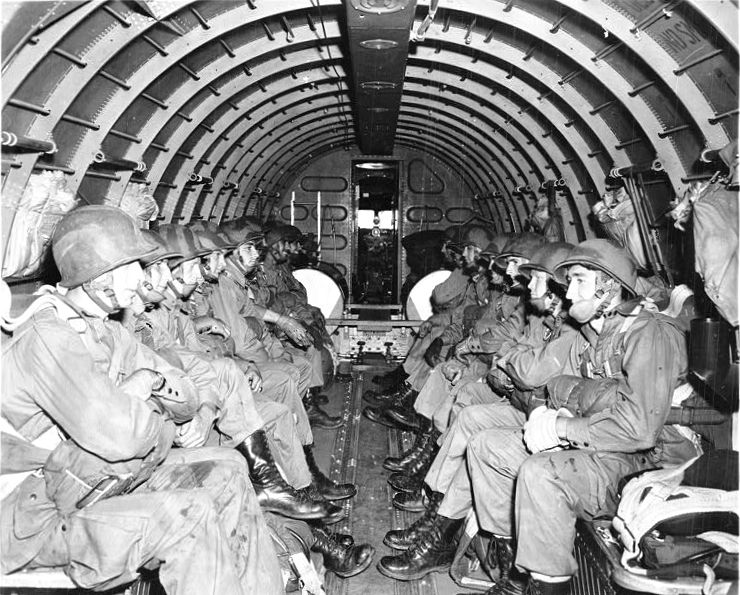
WWII U.S. paratroopers

In 1930, the U.S. Army experimented with the concept of parachuting three-man heavy-machine-gun teams. Nothing came of these early experiments.

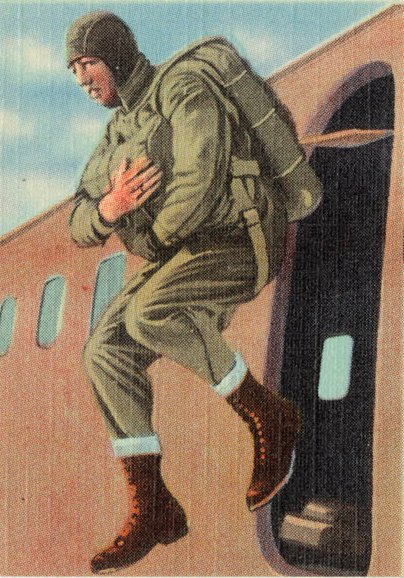
Image representing a U.S. paratrooper at Fort Belvoir, Virginia. Likely ca. 1940–1945

The concept of airborne units was not popular with the top U.S. Armed Forces commanders, but President Franklin D. Roosevelt urged their creation. In July 1940, Major General William C. Lee organized the first paratroop platoon, a test platoon formed from part of the 29th Infantry Regiment.

The platoon leader was 1st Lieutenant William T. Ryder, who made the first jump on August 16, 1940, at Lawson Field, Fort Benning, Georgia, from a B-18 bomber. He was immediately followed by Private William N. King, the first enlisted soldier to make a parachute jump.

This led to the Provisional Parachute Group, and then the United States Army Airborne Command. Lee became the first commander at the new parachute school at Fort Benning, in west-central Georgia, and is regarded by the U.S. military as the father of the Airborne.

The first U.S. combat jump was near Oran, Algeria, in North Africa on November 8, 1942, conducted by elements of the 2nd Battalion, 509th Parachute Infantry Regiment. Paratroopers figured prominently in the Normandy Landings of June 1944.

U.S. combat jumps in WWII

- Operation Torch
- Operation Husky
- Operation Postern
- Operation Avalanche
- Operation Overlord
- Operation Cyclone
- Operation Dragoon
- Operation Market Garden
- Operation Shoestring
- Operation Topside
- Raid at Los Baños
- Operation Varsity
- Operation Gypsy

== See also ==
- List of paratrooper forces
- List of largest parachute assaults
- Airborne forces
- Air Assault Troops
- Military Free Fall – HALO/HAHO
- Jumpmaster
- Pathfinder (military)
- National Airborne Day
- Airdrop
- Parachuting
- Smokejumper
- Static line
- Treejumping
- Gryphon (parachute system)
- Parachute tower
