= List of largest parachute assaults =

This is a list of the largest parachute assaults in history. The overwhelming majority of these occurred during World War II.

- Invasion of Normandy: 13,100 American paratroopers and 8,500 British and Canadian paratroopers
- Operation Varsity: March 24, 1945. 16,000 paratroopers. (Note: The airborne component of Operation Market Garden was a larger operation, but the drop zones were split over three distinct areas and spread over several days. Operation Varsity was conducted on a single day in one location, and was the largest such single airborne operation in history.)
- Operation Market Garden: September 17–25, 1944. 34,600 paratroopers.
- Battle of Crete: May 20 – June 1, 1941. 15,000 paratroopers.
- Tangail Airdrop: Over 5000 Indian Army paratroopers paradropped to capture Poongli Bridge in East Pakistan (present-day Bangladesh) during the Indo-Pakistani War of 1971, also known as the Bangladesh Liberation War.

== See also ==
- American airborne landings in Normandy
- Operation Tonga
- British airborne operations in North Africa
- List of amphibious assault operations

== Bibliography ==
- Devlin, Gerard M. (1979). Paratrooper – The Saga Of Parachute And Glider Combat Troops During World War II. Robson Books. ISBN 0-312-59652-9.
- Rawson, Andrew (2006). Rhine Crossing: Operation Varsity – 30th and 79th US Divisions and 17th US Airborne Division. Pen & Sword Military. ISBN 1-84415-232-4.
- Harclerode, Peter (2005). Wings Of War – Airborne Warfare 1918–1945. Weidenfeld & Nicolson. ISBN 0-304-36730-3.
- Smith, Claude (1992). History of the Glider Pilot Regiment. Pen & Sword Aviation. ISBN 1-84415-626-5.
