= Yoshitatsu Yasuda =

Japanese admiral (1898–1943)

- 安田 義達
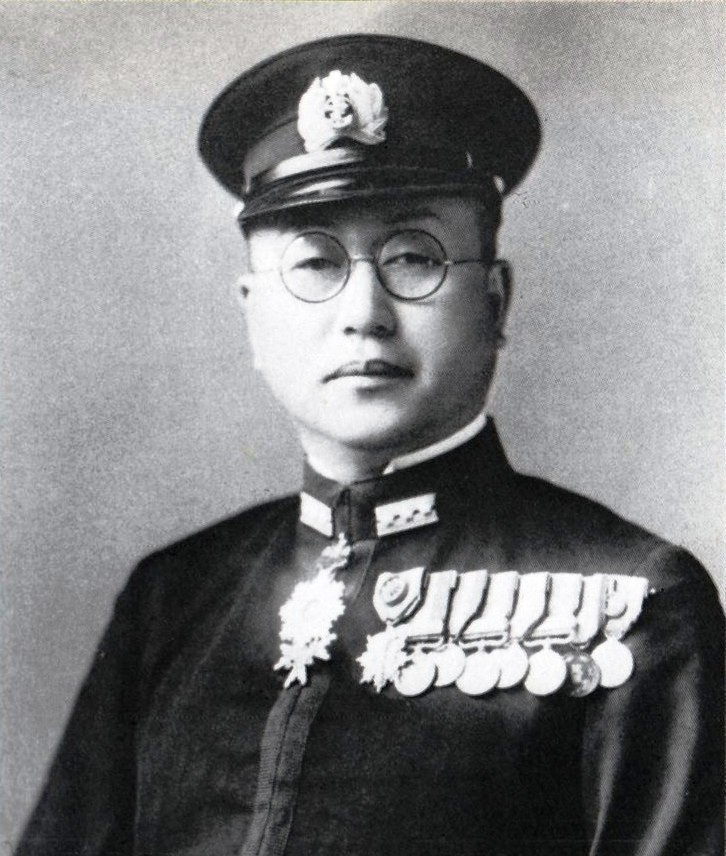
- Born: March 1, 1898; Fukuyama, Hiroshima, Japan
- Died: January 2, 1943 (aged 44); Buna, Papua New Guinea
- Military career
- Allegiance: Empire of Japan
- Branch: Imperial Japanese Navy
- Service years: 1918–1943
- Rank: Vice admiral
- Conflicts: World War II; Battle of Buna–Gona

Yoshitatsu Yasuda (安田義達, Yasuda Yoshitatsu; March 1, 1898 - January 2, 1943) was a Japanese naval officer. He was known as an authority on amphibious warfare, alongside Tada Minoru, and is remembered as a representative figure of the Imperial Japanese Navy. He posthumously received a promotion of two ranks to Vice Admiral during the Pacific War.

== Early life ==
Born in Fukuyama City, Hiroshima Prefecture, he graduated from Hiroshima High Normal School Attached Middle School and completed the 46th term of the Naval Academy in 1918 (Taisho 7). He ranked 66th out of 124. His classmate, Yamamoto Chikao, described Yasuda as "a resolute and open-hearted man, a lovable hero with a youthful spirit."

=== Expert in land warfare ===
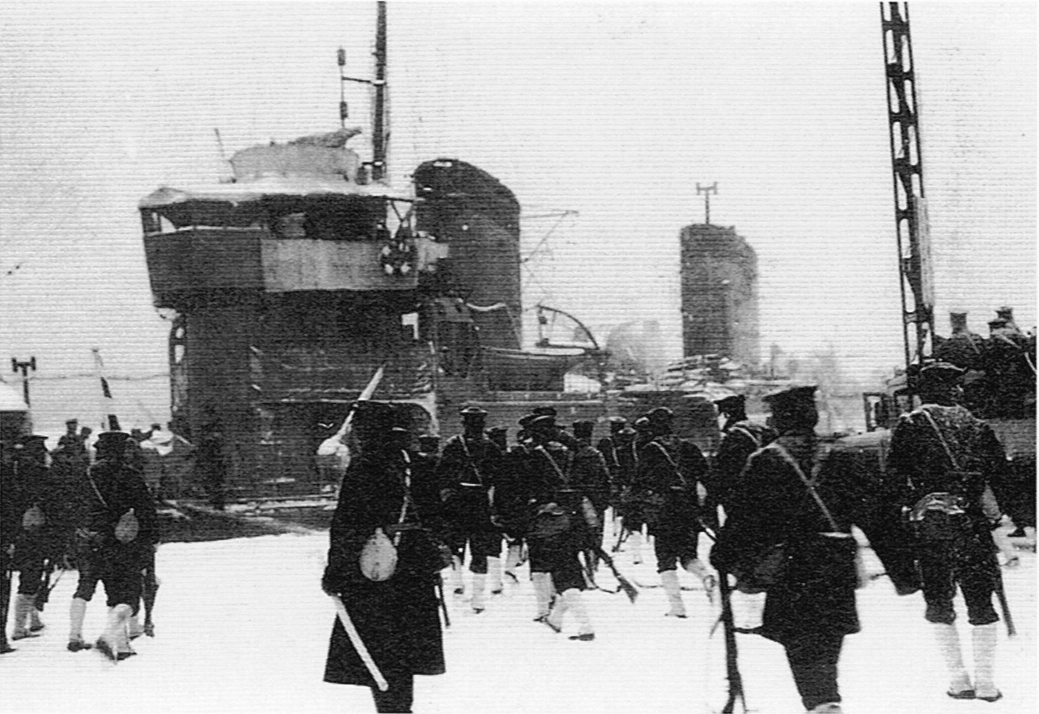
Japanese Navy Land Force deployed during the February 26 Incident. Yasuda participated as a staff officer.

After completing the advanced course at the Naval Gunnery School, he served as the leader of various squads on the battleships Hiei and Mutsu. He later became a student in the specialized course at the Gunnery School and was dispatched to the Imperial Japanese Army Infantry School. Graduates of the specialized course at the Gunnery School were a rarity, with only seven becoming experts in land warfare by 1942 (17th year of Showa). Yasuda was one of the first to achieve this.

In 1930 (5th year of Showa), he was promoted to Navy Lieutenant Commander. During his time as a Lieutenant Commander, he served as a Gunnery School instructor for nearly six years. He also served as a staff officer for the Special Naval Landing Forces in Shanghai, and as the commander of the 1st Special Naval Landing Forces in the Second Sino-Japanese War. He later became the staff officer for the 1st Combined Special Naval Landing Forces, establishing himself as an authority on land warfare within the Navy. He also served as the Executive Officer of the cruiser Tone.

During the February 26 Incident, he became a staff officer for the Navy Ministry's defense and was dispatched from the Yokosuka Naval District to Tokyo on the same day of the incident. In 1940 (15th year of Showa), he was promoted to Navy Captain. During this time, he earned the nickname "Colonel Yasuda". He was later appointed as the headmaster of the Kannonzaki Gunnery School, which was established to provide education in land warfare and anti-aircraft artillery for the Navy. This school introduced the first specialized courses for land warfare in the Imperial Japanese Navy. He later assumed the position of Commander of the 5th Special Naval Landing Forces at the Yokosuka Naval District, just as the Pacific War began.

== Battle at Buna and death ==
Under the command of Taichi Ota, Yokogotoku was initially assigned to the Midway Landing Force. However, following the defeat at the Battle of Midway, they returned to Guam. Subsequently, they were divided and assigned to places like Guadalcanal and Kiska. Yasuda was responsible for the defense of Buna in eastern New Guinea. The combined forces under his command included 292 members of Yokogotoku, 110 members of the Sasebo Naval District Fifth Special Landing Force, and 399 members of the Fourteenth Settsu Detachment. Out of these, there were 482 military personnel, equipped with weak armaments such as 8 cm AA guns, 2 twin 25mm machine guns, 3 rapid-fire guns, and 3 13mm machine guns, with limited supplies. On November 16, 1942, when the landing operation of the US-Australian Allied forces, commanded by Lieutenant General Eichelberger, began, Yasuda abandoned the existing headquarters facilities and established a new headquarters near the Allies landing point. This decision by Yasuda boosted the morale of the troops.

Working in cooperation with Colonel Shigekuni Yamamoto, the commander of the 144th Infantry Regiment, and Engineer Major Tsunekazu Yamamoto, they resisted the Allied forces for about 50 days. It is said that their last moments were either due to a final assault or choosing self-sacrifice when facing the enemy. With the exception of the vice commander who escaped as ordered, the unit was nearly wiped out. The battle at Buna is described as one of the fiercest battles in the US-published war history.

== After death ==
Yasuda left behind a substantial will, resembling a tactical manual that detailed the Allied forces' attack methods, habits, and countermeasures, which was appreciated by the Army. The Mainichi Shimbun newspaper serialized "The Legend of Vice Admiral Yasuda" in its evening edition, and it was published under the title "Commander of Yasuda Land Force" towards the end of the war. The author was naval ensign Eiji Yoshikawa.
