= Giropa Point =

Giropa Point is a point to the east of Buna, Oro Province, Papua New Guinea. The area was the scene of fierce fighting the last stages of the battle of Buna–Gona during World War II.
