= Battle of Buna–Gona: Allied forces and order of battle =

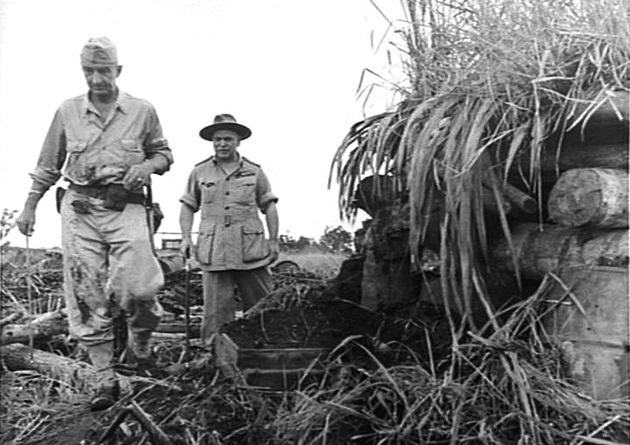
General Thomas Blamey and Lieutenant General Robert Eichelberger inspect a captured bunker at Buna. AWM 014092 (Note: Australian War Memorial.)

The battle of Buna–Gona was part of the New Guinea campaign in the Pacific theatre during World War II. It followed the conclusion of the Kokoda Track campaign and lasted from 16 November 1942 until 22 January 1943. The battle was conducted by Australian and United States forces against the Japanese beachheads at Buna, Sanananda and Gona. The Allied advance on the Japanese positions at Buna–Gona was made by the 16th and 25th Brigades of the Australian 7th Division and the 126th and 128th Infantry Regiments of the US 32nd Infantry Division. During the course of the battle, a further four infantry brigades, two infantry regiments and an armoured squadron of 19 M3 Stuart tanks were deployed.

Significant criticism has been levelled at the combat effectiveness of US troops and specifically the 32nd Division, both within the US command and in subsequent histories. A lack of training is most often cited in defence of their performance. Several historians have also commented on the lack of training afforded Australian militia units engaged in the battle although some had the benefit of a "stiffening" of experienced junior officers posted to them from the Australian Imperial Force (AIF).

Before the Allied forces arrived on the Buna–Gona coast, Richard K. Sutherland, then major general and chief of staff to General Douglas MacArthur, Supreme Commander of Allied Forces in the Southwest Pacific Area, had "glibly" referred to the Japanese coastal fortifications as "hasty field entrenchments." Both the strength and the overall combat effectiveness of the Japanese defenders was severely underestimated. Maps of the area were inaccurate and lacked detail. Aerial photos were not generally available to commanders in the field. Allied command had failed to make effective provision for supply of artillery or tanks believing quite mistakenly that air support could replace the need for these. (Note: Historian, Adrian Threlfall, among others, notes that tactical air support in jungle conditions was in its infancy and that the amount of support provided was insufficient.) Allied commanders in the field were unable to provide fire support capable of suppressing, let alone neutralizing the Japanese positions to an extent that would permit attacking infantry to close with and overwhelm them. Logistical limitations constrained efforts to make good these deficiencies.

Scanty, ill-informed intelligence led MacArthur to believe that Buna could be taken with relative ease. MacArthur never visited the front during the campaign. He had no understanding of the conditions faced by his commanders and troops, yet he continued to interfere and pressure them to achieve unreasonable outcomes. Terrain and persistent pressure for haste meant that there was little, if any, time given for reconnaissance. Pressure applied by MacArthur has been attributed to both protracting the duration of the battle and increasing the number of Allied casualties experienced.

== Training and equipment ==
=== US 32nd Division ===
The 32nd Infantry Division was a National Guard unit (militia) from Michigan and Wisconsin, commanded at the start of the battle by Major General Edwin F. Harding. It had been sent to Australia in April 1942. It consisted of the 126th, 127th and 128th Infantry Regiments. Together with the US 41st Division, also based in Australia, it formed US I Corps, under command of Lieutenant General Robert L. Eichelberger.

Staff officers considered the US 32nd Division unprepared and under-supplied for combat. While in the US, the division had trained for a European war. Standard US Army practices dictated that a division should train together for a year, but the 32nd had picked up more than 3,000 replacements fresh out of boot camp when the division was suddenly redirected to Australia. When in Australia, they had moved to three different camps and were tasked with building each of them, all of which cut heavily into the division's training time. Harding, commenting on the unit's training, said, "From February when I took over until November when we went into battle we were always getting ready to move, on the move, or getting settled after a move." What limited training they had received in Australia had been to prepare them to fight in Australia's outback to defend the country from Japanese attack. The 32nd was not trained, equipped or prepared to fight in the jungle nor taught Japanese tactics.

In early July, Major General Robert C. Richardson, Jr., Commanding General, US VII Corps, inspected the 32nd and found them in the "elementary stages" of training. When Eichelberger, commanding general I Corps, inspected the troops in early September, he felt the division was still unready for combat. Before he could make any changes in the training regiment, MacArthur insisted that a division be immediately moved from Australia to New Guinea. Eichelberger felt that the facilities at Camp Cable, where the 32nd Division was based, were inadequate and a further move was necessary. This pending move weighed heavily in his choice to deploy the 32nd Division to New Guinea. Blamey had been told that the 41st Division was better than the 32nd but whether this was true at the time the 32nd Division was deployed is unclear. The transfer to Port Moresby, less the 127th Infantry Regiment, was completed on 28 September. The 127th Infantry Regiment followed and joined the division in the battle area, with advanced elements arriving in early December, followed by the remainder of the regiment in the middle of the month.

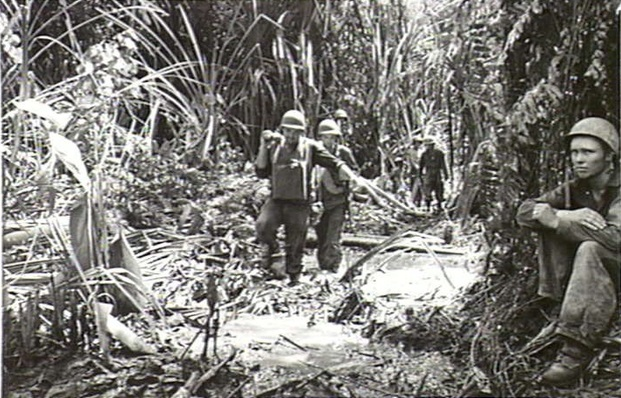
Carting ammunition forward. There was no escaping mud and water on the battlefield. AWM014244

Major J.H. Trevivian, assigned to the division as the Australian liaison officer, noted that, "the officers had no sense of responsibility for the welfare of the men entrusted to them," and that the US GIs "were treated like cattle". Conversely, no soldier appeared to have a good word for any officer.

Not only was the 32nd Division's training deficient but, after their arrival in New Guinea, the men quickly found that some of their weapons, and much of their clothing and equipment, were unsatisfactory and that they had to modify many details of their organisation. Their heavy-weight herringbone twill combat uniforms were the wrong colour. In the early part of the Kokoda Track campaign, Australian soldiers wore tan uniforms that stood out against the jungle. Learning from the experience, the Americans had two sets of their uniforms dyed a darker green at a dry cleaner in Brisbane. The dye was more like paint and would not allow the cloth to wick moisture away from the skin. This caused "hideous jungle ulcers". While they had been issued leather toilet seats they had no machetes, insect repellent, waterproof containers for medicine or personal effects, and it rained heavily every day. When they received quinine pills, water chlorination tablets, vitamin pills, or salt tablets, usually a few days supply, they began to disintegrate almost as soon as the men put them in their pockets or packs. Most of the division's heavy equipment had been left in Australia due to lack of transportation. Significantly, this included all of its field artillery (Note: None of the 105 mm howitzers initially moved to New Guinea with the division. Four 105 mm howitzers were subsequently flown to Port Moresby. Only one was eventually flown forward to the battlefield.) and about two-thirds of its 81 mm mortars.

Problems with equipment were not isolated to the Americans. Anything susceptible to moisture was likely to fail. The reliability of radios was a particular problem. In the opening engagement, a large portion of grenades used by the Americans failed to detonate. These were Australian supplied Mills bombs. The failure was attributed to them having been wet.

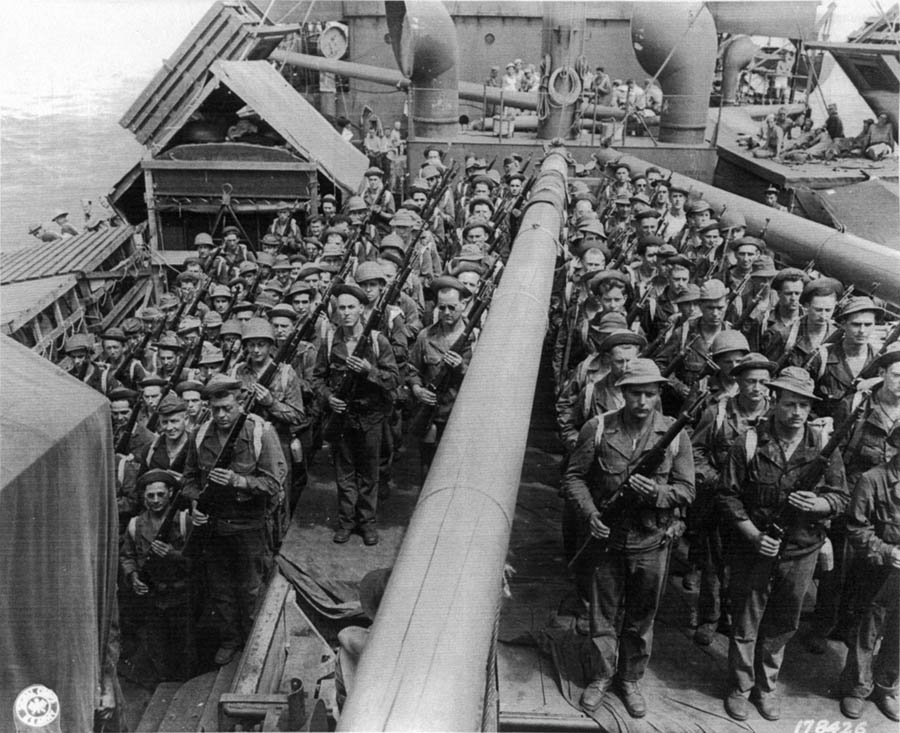
Soldiers of the 127th Infantry, 32nd Division, conducting a rifle inspection aboard the USS George Taylor en route from Brisbane, Australia to Port Moresby, New Guinea, on 18 November 1942.

The Americans had not been prepared physically for the rigors of war let alone the particularly harsh conditions they would face in New Guinea. The 2nd Battalion of the 126th Infantry Regiment was called on to trek 130 miles (210 km) from 14 October to 12 November, across the extremely rugged Kapa Kapa Trail. More than two-thirds of their men became casualties, sick with malaria and other tropical diseases. They did not encounter a single Japanese soldier. The remainder of the division was largely spared the hardships of an overland trek. Units were flown to strips inland at Fasarsi (I/126th) and on the north coast at Pongani and Wanigela. These had been developed after the departure of the II/126th.

The division went into the first day of battle with a brash cockiness. They were "joking and laughing, and sure of an easy victory." They ended the day, a badly shaken outfit. "Now they were dazed and taken aback by the mauling they had received at the hands of the Japanese." By late November, morale was low due to heavy casualties and disease. Self-inflicted wounds were increasingly responsible for American casualties. Milner writes that, "In almost two weeks of fighting they had failed to score even one noteworthy success."

Lieutenant General Edmund Herring, GOC New Guinea Force, arrived at the American front on 25 November and reported that the American infantry had "maintained a masterly inactivity at Buna". Of his inspection on 2 December, Eichelberger wrote: "The rear areas are strong and the front line is weak. Inspired leadership is lacking. ... Our patrols were dazed by the hazards of swamp and jungle; they were unwilling to undertake the patrolling which alone could safeguard their own interests." Colonel Rogers, then I Corps Intelligence Officer, in an inspection of the same time, reported:

The troops were deplorable. ... Troops were scattered along a trail toward the front line in small groups, engaged in eating, sleeping, during the time they were supposed to be in an attack. ... Outside of the 150 men in the foxholes in the front lines, the remainder of the 2,000 men in the combat area could not have been even considered a reserve – since three or four hours would have been required to organise and move them on any tactical mission.

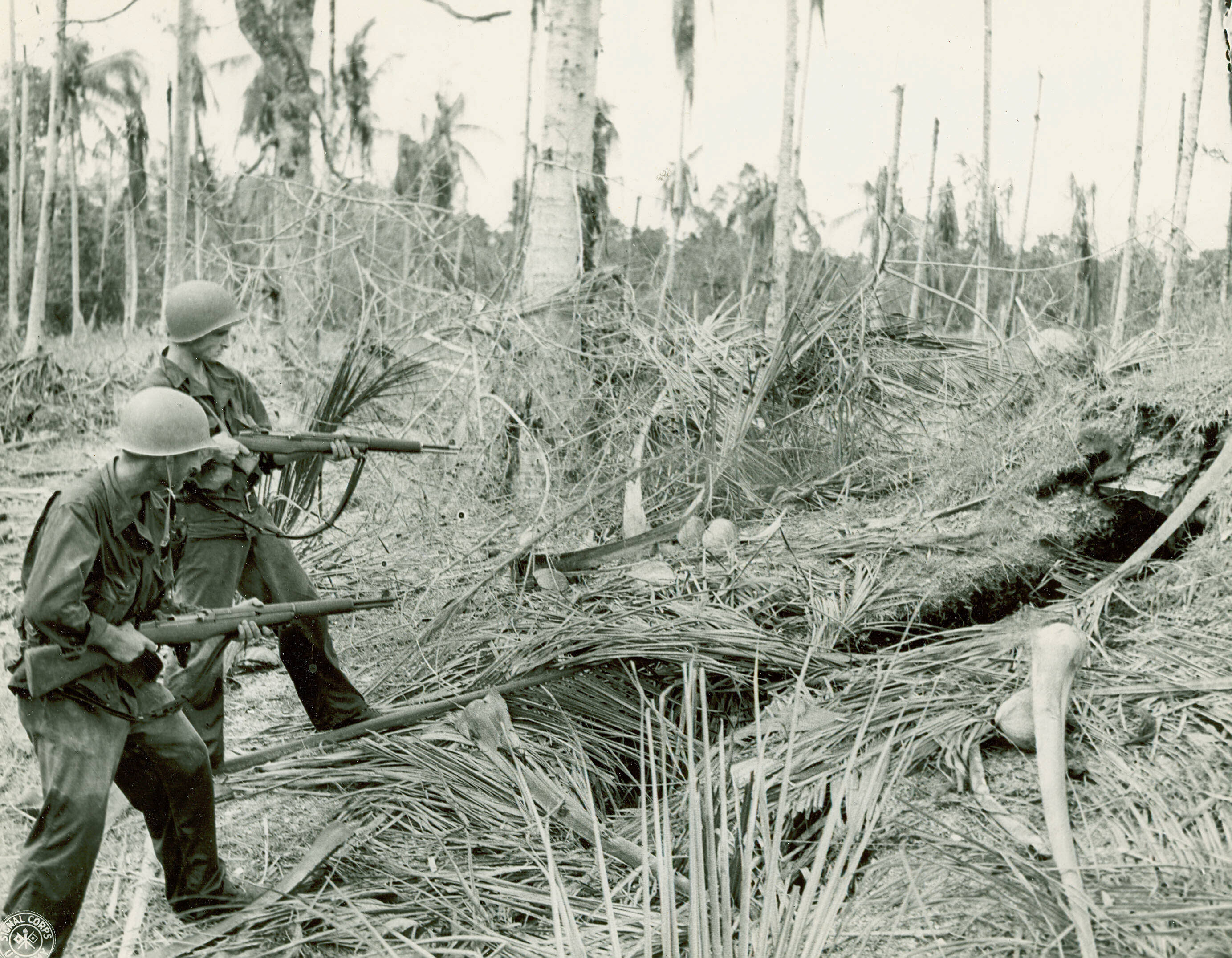
American soldiers clearing a bunker near Buna.

Colonel Clarence A. Martin, who subsequently replaced Colonel Tracy Hale as commander of Warren Force, had accompanied Rogers. Martin later admitted, after some experience with the Japanese defences, that had attacks been continued on the day he conducted his inspection, they would not have been successful. Lieutenant Colonel Larr, of MacArther's staff, was sent to Buna after the first week. He reported back that: "The GIs had not been properly trained and were reluctant to close with and kill the enemy, had abandoned weapons and had fled into the swamp." Lex McAuley observed: "This all reflects poorly on the US Regular and National Guard officers at all levels in the 32nd Division." In contrast, there were outstanding performances by junior leaders such as Staff Sergeant Herman Bottcher and many acts of individual bravery.

While lack of training and the availability of time able to be committed to this are clearly responsible for the criticism levelled at the 32nd Division, McCarthy contrasts this with what had been achieved earlier in raising the Second Australian Imperial Force (2nd AIF) in a similarly short time.

=== Australian militia ===
In fairness, Australian militia soldiers of the 30th Brigade, which included the 36th, 49th and 55th/53rd Battalions, did not fare much better. These units had spent most of their time in New Guinea unloading boats or constructing roads rather than training or in combat. Many men received their first training in the use of Bren and Owen guns or throwing grenades on their arrival at the front, just a few days prior to being sent in to battle. Private Kevin Barry recalled the experience: "Bearing in mind at this time I’d never held a rifle in my hand, never ever fired one – didn't know anything about it...Next minute we're over there [Sanananda] and we're lining up at 3:15 pm on the 7th of December, fixed bayonets..."

The 49th Battalion had received a "stiffening" of experienced AIF officers. Not so the 55th/53rd, which had amalgamated on 26 October. It lacked cohesion and training as a unit. These two units were cast into battle on 7 December. At the end of the day, 8 officers and 122 men of the 55th/53rd Battalion were listed as killed, wounded or missing. Significantly, in view of later developments within this battalion, the losses included 28 NCOs. Losses for the 49th Battalion were 6 officers and 93 men. Combined, these casualties represented nearly 60 percent of the attacking force.

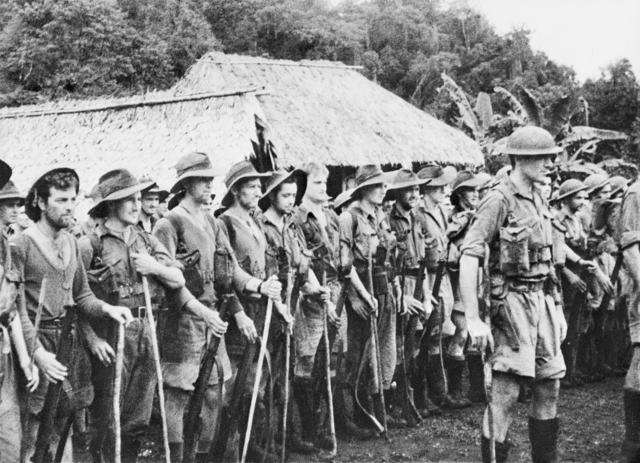
The 39th Battalion AMF on parade having returned from fighting on the Kokoda Track, 1942. AWM013289

In an attempted attack in the early morning of 13 December involving the 55th/53rd, the battalion diarist noted that their officers "had great difficulty in moving troops forward whilst dense undergrowth made maintenance of control and direction difficult. Troops were prone to go to ground and thus prevented themselves from being extricated by fire and movement."

By 22 December, Brigadier Selwyn Porter, commanding 30th Brigade, had become bitterly critical of both the 36th and 55th/53rd Battalions. In a report to Vasey, he said that any success which was theirs was "due to a percentage of personnel who are brave in the extreme"; and "the result of unskilful aggression". He was caustic in referring to their deficiencies in training and spirit. McCarthy observes however, that "it is very doubtful if any Australian units could have suffered the same percentage of losses in their first action and done much better". The final tally of casualties at Sanananda was to show that the Australian militia losses were almost one-third of the total Allied casualties suffered there.

In late December 1942 Brigade HQ noted that:

... in the 39 and 49 Aust Inf Bns the bulk of the trained and resolute leaders have become casualties, and those that remain are not up to the standard of the units when they originally arrived here. Seven members of the 39th Aust Inf Bn are under arrest on charges of cowardice; this position is not peculiar to 39th Inf Bn as similar action could be taken in numerous cases in other units.

Incidents of such seriousness were not isolated to the militia units. On 23 December, the composite 2/16th – 2/27th Battalion reported that "two soldiers have been placed under arrest for refusing to take part in a routine [reconnaissance] patrol". Morale had plummeted. Likewise, according to Dean, the "49th Bn was seen as undisciplined and under trained until late 1942. ... The battalion's history noted that 'with hindsight, it is unbelievable that Army commanders or a government could have allowed troops as inadequately prepared as the 49th to move to a war zone'." Similarly, the US 32nd Division went into battle ill-prepared and inadequately trained. (Note: Eichelberger quoted in Advance to Buna – Part 2 of The 32nd 'Red Arrow' Infantry Division in World War II.)

== Intelligence ==
Leading into the battle, Allied intelligence was severely deficient in respect to the disposition of Japanese forces at the beachheads and knowledge of the battlefield. Both the strength and the overall combat effectiveness of the Japanese defenders was severely underestimated. In what was, according to Charles Anderson, "...a major intelligence blunder, Allied staffs told frontline commanders that they faced no more than 1,500 to 2,000 enemy and could expect the Japanese to surrender by about 1 December." Other intelligence described the Japanese defenders as "sick and malnourished" when in fact, at least 6,500 from the Imperial Japanese Army and marines from the Special Naval Landing Forces held the beachhead. (Note: Papuans provided Division G2, Colonel Gordon Rogers, with information that led him to believe the Japanese garrison at Buna was about a battalion.) They were largely experienced troops, in good spirit, well prepared and well provisioned. What had filtered down to the GIs making the attack on 19 November, was that there were only two squads of Japanese at Buna.

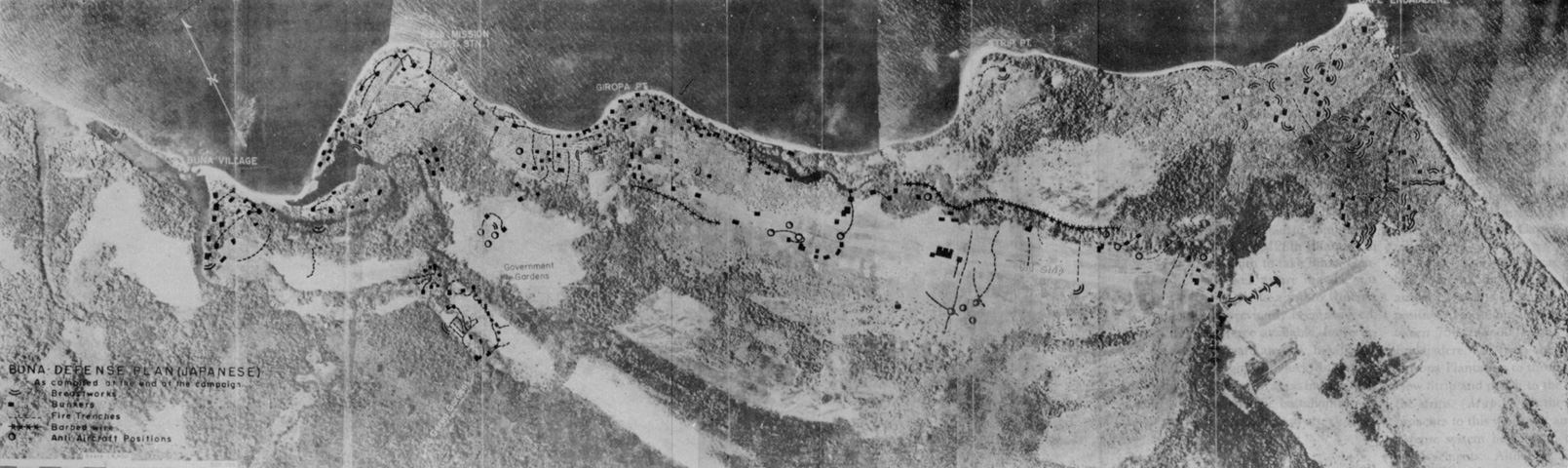
Reproduction of an original photomap from the Report of the Commanding General, Buna Forces in the Buna Campaign. Reliable maps and photographs were not readily available, particularly at the start of the battle.

Brigadier General Charles A. Willoughby told MacArthur before the operation that there was "little indication of an attempt to make a strong stand against the Allied advance." Based on what little they knew about the area, Allied intelligence believed that widespread swampland would render the construction of strongpoints in the Buna–Gona area impossible. Scanty, ill-informed intelligence led MacArthur to believe that Buna could be taken with relative ease.

Australian maps of the area were, for the most part, only sketches. They were so inaccurate that they showed some rivers flowing uphill. The lack of accurate maps of the area made it extremely difficult to accurately position and target artillery.

Aerial photos were not generally available and those photographs that were available were not produced in sufficient numbers, nor distributed in a timely fashion to commanders. The 30th Brigade at Sanananda did not receive any aerial photos of the area until 18 December, almost two weeks after arriving at the front. Brien recounts that after the battle "Lieutenant Colonel Ralph Honner, commanding the 39th Battalion, was horrified to learn that there had been a considerable number of good aerial reconnaissance photos which had not been distributed." While the photos could show a large area, they could also give the wrong impression. The dense vegetation often obscured many of the important features. Areas of ground which looked flat and relatively clear often turned out to be large patches of kunai grass or swamp. They also failed to identify many of the Japanese defensive positions.

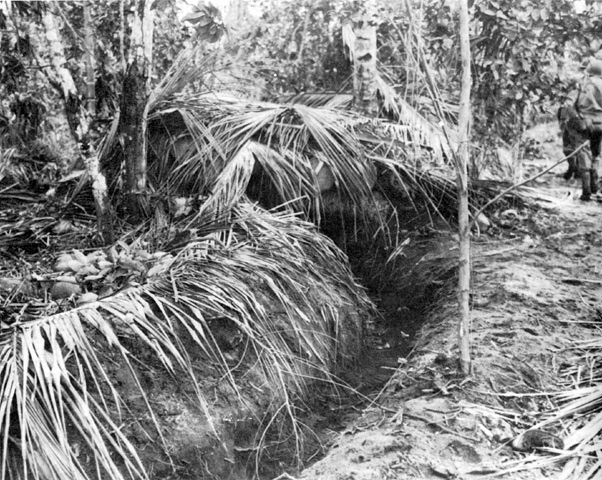
A communications trench connecting bunkers (foreground) leads to a heavily camouflaged Japanese bunker (background) made from coconut logs.

Terrain and persistent pressure for haste meant that there was little, if any, time given for reconnaissance. Intelligence gathering on the Japanese defences and dispositions was often incomplete, if attempted at all. Captain Harry Katekar, Adjutant of the 2/27th Battalion, wrote afterward:

We were thrown in with scant information about the enemy, no aerial photographs, nothing to go on. I don’t recall ever seeing a proper plan of the area showing where the 25th Brigade was at that time when we were supposed to go in or, in fact, what the 2/14th were doing on our right. The whole thing was rushed and therefore one can expect there to be what actually transpired – a slaughter of good men! The correct way to get information is to send in recce patrols. That's always the way you do it, because you get the enemy to disclose where he is. You don’t go in with a full company rushing in against something you know nothing about.

== Logistics ==
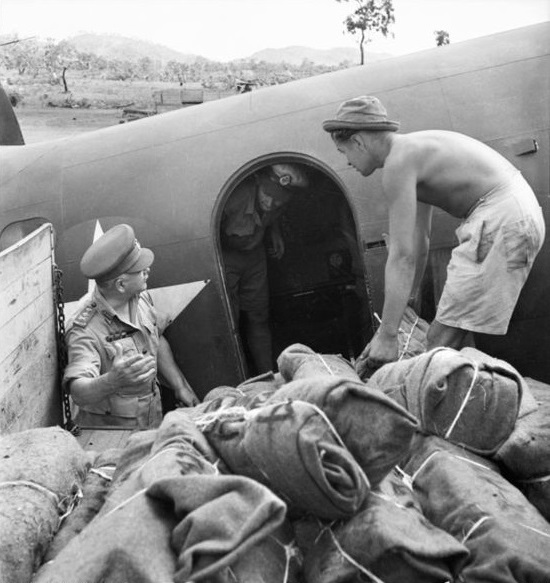
Troops load ammunition wrapped in blankets, which will be dropped to the troops in the Buna–Gona area. Blamey displays a keen interest. AWM013836

After the Battle of Milne Bay, the Allies set about developing a number of aircraft landing fields. The fields were built to enable Allied forces to more quickly deploy in response to any future Japanese landings, as forward bases for the air campaign against the Japanese, and to support the battle at the beachheads. They were used to deploy a part of the US 32nd Division to the Buna area. Colonel Leif Sverdrup was awarded the Silver Star and the Distinguished Service Medal for his efforts in reconnaissance and construction of air strips in New Guinea, including those at Fasari, Embessa and Pongani.

During the Kokoda campaign, there were three alternatives available to the Australians for resupply. Supplies and equipment could either be carried by Papuan porters overland from Port Moresby, they could be air dropped or they could be landed at a forward air strip and man-packed from there. Topography precluded the prospect of developing an overland route for motor transport. (Note: New Guinea Force Instruction No 13 assigned to Australian New Guinea Administrative Unit (ANGAU) the task of, "the construction of a road from McDonald's [Corner (just beyond Ilolo)] to Kokoda and the maintenance of supplies to the forces of the Kokoda District. ... The road was to be commenced no later than 29 June [1942]." ANGAU was responsible for the recruitment and management of Papuan labour in support of the Allied war effort. Lieutenant (later Captain) Bert Kienzle was assigned this task and was subsequently appointed to the 7th Australian Division as Officer Commanding Native Labour, He served along the Kokoda Track and at Buna–Gona, until he was evacuated sick on 22 December. He was awarded the MBE (Military Division) for his work in this capacity. The labour resources under control of Kienzel were fully committed to maintaining the line of communication along the Kokoda Track. Before enlisting, Bert Kienzle was a rubber planter and gold miner from the Yodda River Valley, near Kokoda. Of the plan to build a road, Bert Kienzel later said, "Some twit at headquarters had looked at a map and said ' We'll put a road there'." It has been described as a "pipe dream". Lieutenant Noel Owers, a surveyor with New Guinea Force, was subsequently given the task of surveying a route to Kokoda. Owers prepared a report outlining a route to Kagi (about halfway to Kokoda). The plan was cancelled when the extent of resources required was realised. Extension of the jeep track from Ilolo to Nauro, about two-thirds the way to Kagi, was begun instead. By the end of September 1942, the road had only been developed as far as Owers’ Corner, before this plan too was cancelled. Owers' Corner is 38 miles (61 km) from Port Moresby. Around 7 miles (11 km) of road was completed. The Kokoda Track Commemorative web site and James give a cross-section of the track. The cross-section gives some understanding of the enormity of the task, particularly when compared with the extent of work that was actually completed.) Supply was limited by the number of available aircraft and unsuitable weather over the Owen Stanley Range stopping flights. Civilian aircraft and pilots were pressed into service in an effort to meet demand. They were mainly used in flights between Australia and New Guinea or in rear areas in order to release military planes and personnel for service in forward areas.

Unreliable maps or poor visibility in the drop zone meant that supplies were often misdropped. Parachutes were in limited supply. As a result, only essential equipment, ammunition and medical supplies were dropped with parachutes. Rations and other supplies were "free dropped". Packaging was primitive and inadequate. The rate of recovery was low and the rate of breakage high – on average, 50 percent. Of a drop made on 22 November, it was reported that only about 5 percent was recovered. (Note: Mayo reports a drop being made half a days march from where it was expected.)

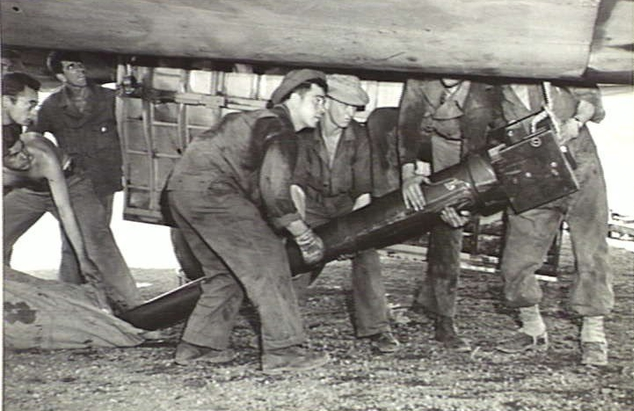
The only 105mm M3A1 howitzer used in the Battle for Buna–Gona is unloaded through the bomb bay doors of the Boeing B17 Flying Fortress used to transport it to New Guinea from Australia.

While the use of air transport generally restricted the availability of heavy equipment, some artillery was broken down and transported by air to the Buna–Gona area. Another notable exception was equipment of the 43rd General Service Regiment. On 25 November, 210 men of the regiment were flown to Dobodura to construct more runways. Transported with them were two tractors, five mowers, a sheepsfoot roller and a grader. All of these were disassembled and cut down to allow loading and then reconstructed on site.

Air strips were quickly developed at Dobodura and Popondetta to support the US 32nd Division and Australian 7th Division respectively. The first temporary strip at Dobodura was cleared by a company of the 114th Engineer Battalion. It was completed on 21 November, after a day of work. The strip at Popondetta was commenced on 19 November by the 2/6th Field Company. Completed after two days, it received its first landings on 21 November. (Note: Multiple strips were cleared at both Dobodura and Popondetta.)

The alternative of resupply by sea was equally problematic. Before the war, coastal traders approached the north coast of New Guinea from Rabaul, on the island of New Britain. This route was denied by the Japanese occupation of the island. The coastal passage from Milne Bay was treacherous and lacked an identified safe sea route. An assortment of small vessels were operated by the Small Ships Section of the US Army Services of Supply (USASOS). The vessels were "schooners, motorships, motor launches, cabin cruisers, ketches, trawlers, barges, and miscellaneous vessels, most of which were ancient and rusty." They were leased or requisitioned by the US Army and largely crewed by Australians under contract with USASOS. Initially, these vessels faced a constant threat of attack by Japanese planes. This situation eased as the Allies began to achieve air dominance near the end of 1942. The Small Ships Section was operating vessels up to 500 tons but most were significantly smaller than this.

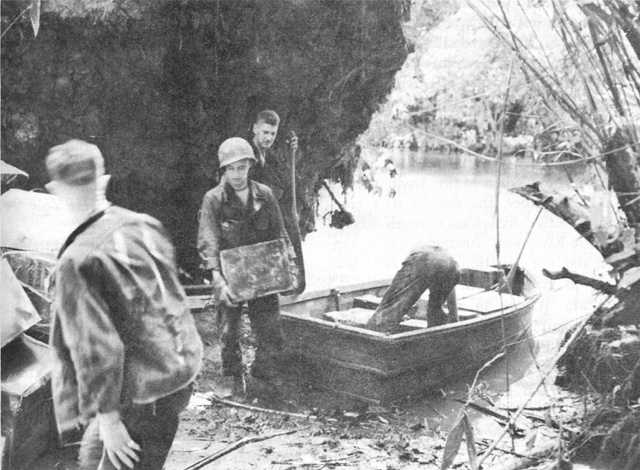
An assault boat being used to transport rations, Girua River, December 1942.

Oro Bay was the nearest suitable location to be developed as a harbour in support of the Buna–Gona operations. It is located 10 miles (16 km) southeast of Dobodura. The road eventually constructed to connect the two was 25 miles (40 km) long. Without any developed facilities, stores and equipment had to be cross-loaded onto barges or double canoes for landing. Harding's plan was to support his forces by ferrying supplies from Oro Bay to Hariko using luggers and a captured Japanese barge. Late on 16 November, making this journey, a convoy of three luggers with the barge, small boats and pontoons in tow was attacked by fourteen Japanese Zero fighters as it rounded Cape Sudest. The three boats and the barge were set ablaze. Two 25-pounders of the 2/5th Field Regiment loaded on the barge were lost; 24 soldiers and 28 Papuans were killed. Many more were wounded. Two more luggers were attacked the next morning. One was lost, while one had to return to Milne Bay for repairs. Only one lugger remained and was insufficient to support Harding's force. Sea resupply from Oro Bay was effectively suspended for three weeks while these losses were made good. Limited supplies could be paddled or man-handled around the coast; or packed overland. Apart from the critical shortages this created on the eve of battle, Harding's force had to rely on air support for resupply in the interim.

The Allies had jeeps flown in to help move stores forward. These significantly eased the workload faced by the Papuan porters. The transverse track connecting Ango, Soputa and Jumbora was developed with corduroy to allow communication between the three Allied fronts.

The Allies faced critical shortages of ammunition and rations at the start of the battle. American troops subsisted for almost a week on a daily diet of one-third of a 'C' ration and one-sixth of a 'D' ration. This was equivalent to about 1,000 calories a day. (Note: A 'D' ration is 3 chocolate bars.) The lot of the Australian troops was similar. The logistical situation improved as the battle progressed but remained a defining feature of the engagement. (Note: Milner states, "Supply at Buna, in short, had ceased to be a problem just as the fight for the place was coming to an end." The Center of Military History publication records that supply was an "extraordinarily difficult problem throughout the operation." The United States Army publication is understood to be the appendices to the Report of the Commanding General Buna Forces in the Buna Campaign. December 1, 1942 – January 25, 1943. This document lists ongoing issues in meeting the logistical requirement of the American forces at Buna–Gona. McAuley, attributing the statement to Colonel Bradley of the US 32nd Division records the opinion that, "it was fantasy to claim the Allied victory at Buna was due to superior performance; it was due to Japanese isolation and a marginally better but enduring Allied logistical system." (Note: McAuley cites Mayo as his source. He argues against this position and proposes instead, that the victory can be ascribed to Japanese command being "inflexible and incompetent at higher levels.")) Improvements in infrastructure and capacity were largely consumed by increases in the size of the force. (Note: By way of example, Milner records that Harding's request for the 127th Infantry Regiment to be deployed was denied until the level of supply could be increased. MacArthur reports, "Shipping resources and supply facilities were taxed to the limit to transport and maintain a force of this size. ... These facilities had to be developed at the same time that the troops were moved into position." Despite the significant increase in capacity resulting from Operation Lilliput (see section – 'Sea route opened'), the level of supply never reached the point where it ceased to be an "extraordinarily difficult problem". While there was significant attrition due to disease and relief of some units, four brigades, two regiments and an armoured squadron were deployed additional to the Allied forces that commenced the battle (see section – 'Allied forces') and the number of artillery pieces increased from six to over twenty (see section – 'Artillery').)

=== Sea route opened ===
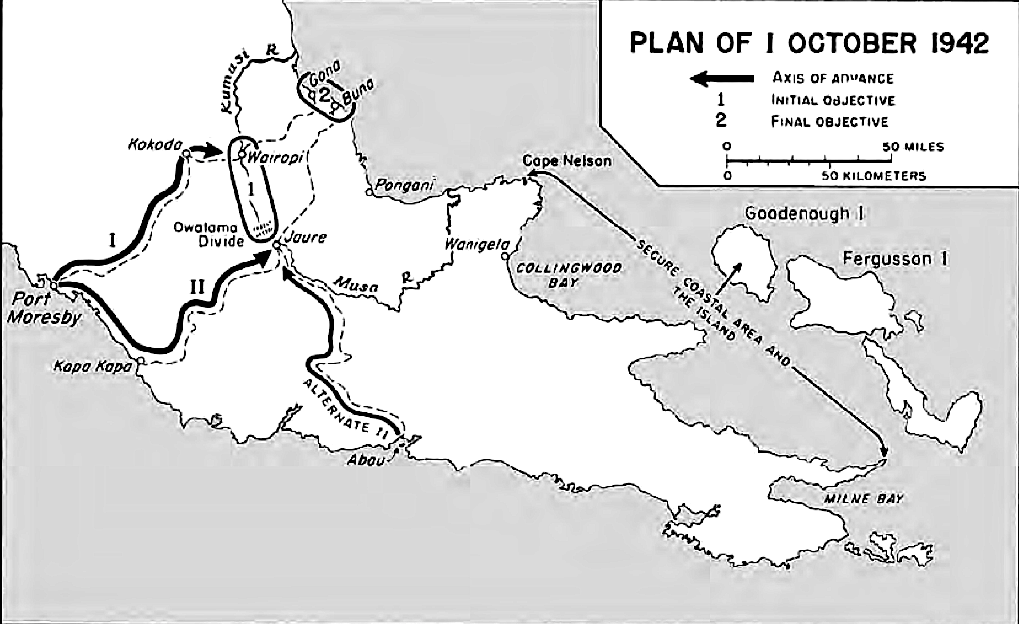
Inside passage, Milne Bay to Cape Nelson and Oro Bay.

In October, the Allies captured Goodenough Island off the northeast coast of New Guinea, with little Japanese resistance. In the hands of the Japanese, the island had potentially compromised the security of the north coast. From early 1943, the Allies developed it as a forward base.

The route between the north shore and the D'Entrecasteaux Islands had never been accurately charted. It was described by Colonel Wilson, Chief of Transportation, as "the most dangerous coastline in the world." Vessels of the Small Ships Section, apart from delivering cargo from Milne Bay to Wanigela, Pongani, Oro Bay and Hariko, made a valuable contribution to opening up the inside passage to larger shipping. Of the section, Masterson wrote: "their Australian crews rigged sails when the engines broke down, and made emergency repairs when the hulls were punctured with bullets or jagged coral." They landed elements of the invasion force and provided logistical support. To avoid Japanese attacks, they hid in rivers by day and "moved at night through uncharted waters, marking reefs with empty oil drums and keeping records of observations and soundings, which were later used in charts."

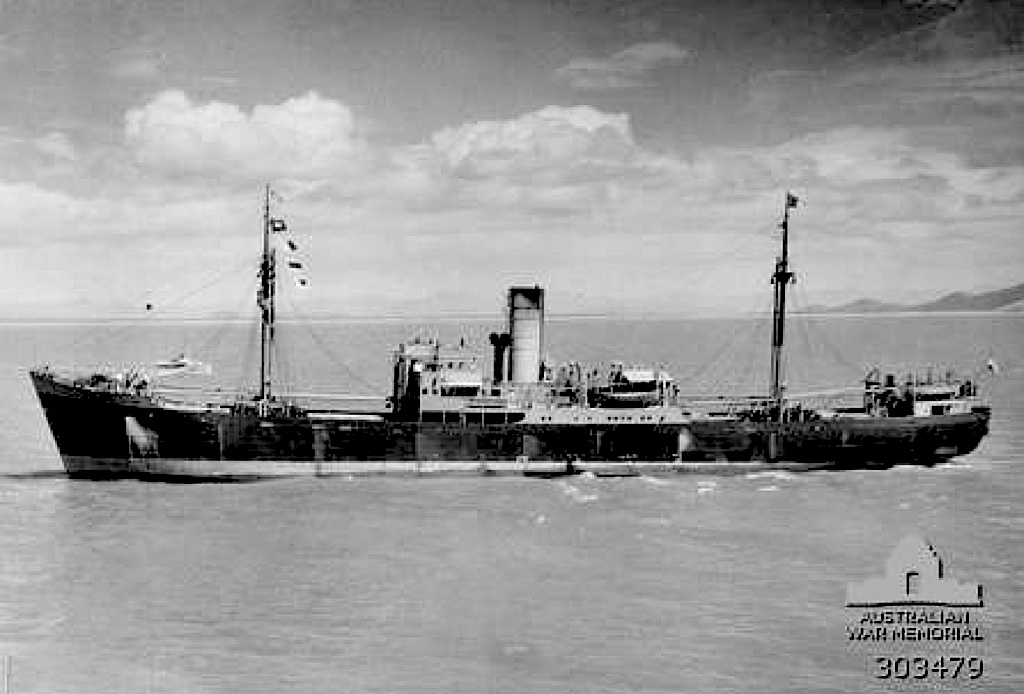
SS Karsik, the first large ship into Oro Bay.

Those efforts were augmented by the arrival of HMAS Paluma. The forty-five ton examination vessel began surveys to find a reliable approach for larger vessels from Milne Bay to Oro Bay. In addition to surveys, the vessel was to install lights, land shore parties for reconnaissance, establish radio stations and pilot ships through discovered channels. By early November Paluma had found a route around Cape Nelson suitable for larger vessels in the Small Ships fleet. Thereafter, the larger vessels discharged at Porlock. The luggers concentrated on transporting forward from there. The hydrographic section in the Royal Australian Navy (RAN) learned of the local effort and provided additional support. HMA Ships Warrego, Stella, and Polaris were tasked to survey and establish safe passage for large ships from Milne Bay to Cape Nelson. HMAS Paluma worked on the route forward to Oro Bay. These combined efforts made the large ship convoy service of Operation Lilliput a possibility.

The first large vessel to deliver supplies to Oro Bay was the SS Karsik. (Note: Karsik was the German Soneck impounded in the Netherlands East Indies. She had been used as a train ferry at Batavia, making her suited for transporting tanks to the Allied forces at Buna.) She was escorted by HMAS Lithgow, in Operation Karsik on the night of 11/12 December 1942. The cargo was four Stuart light tanks of the Australian 2/6th Armoured Regiment and seven days of supplies for the 2/9th Battalion. Karsik returned with a second load of tanks on the 14th, in Operation Tramsik. On 18 December the Japara escorted by Lithgow departed Milne Bay and arrived at Oro Bay on the 20th. This voyage inaugurated the regular supply runs of Operation Lilliput. With few exceptions, the convoys of Lilliput were composed of the Dutch KPM vessels under the control of the US Army Services of Supply escorted by an Australian corvette. (Note: The maximum lift achieved by air was on 14 December, when 74 flights delivered a total of 178 tons to Buna–Gona. Milner reports that, on 31 December, two ships arrived at Oro Bay carrying 350 and 500 tons of cargo each. In the period 11–31 December, nine ship loads delivered approximately of 4,000 tons of cargo. This was more than three times the tonnage supplied to the 32nd Division by air for the same period. In combination with smaller vessels, the average level of resupply by sea was 200 tons per day.)

== Allied command ==
MacArthur moved the advanced echelon of GHQ to Port Moresby on 6 November 1942. Blamey, commander of Allied Land Forces, had been sent forward earlier and had assumed command at Port Moresby on 23 September. The two Allied divisions, the Australian 7th and US 32nd, were under the immediate command of Lieutenant General Herring, GOC of New Guinea Force. Herring "stepped up" to an advanced headquarters (Advanced New Guinea Force) that was established at Popondetta at 8:00 pm on 28 November. Blamey assumed command of the rear New Guinea Force headquarters at Port Moresby. Eichelberger, when sent forward by MacArthur might otherwise have rightly assumed command of both Allied divisions at the beachheads. When Blamey and MacArthur returned to Australia, Herring "stepped back" to the rear headquarters on 12 January. Eichelberger then took command of the Advanced headquarters with Berryman as his chief-of-staff.

=== MacArthur's pressure and posturing ===
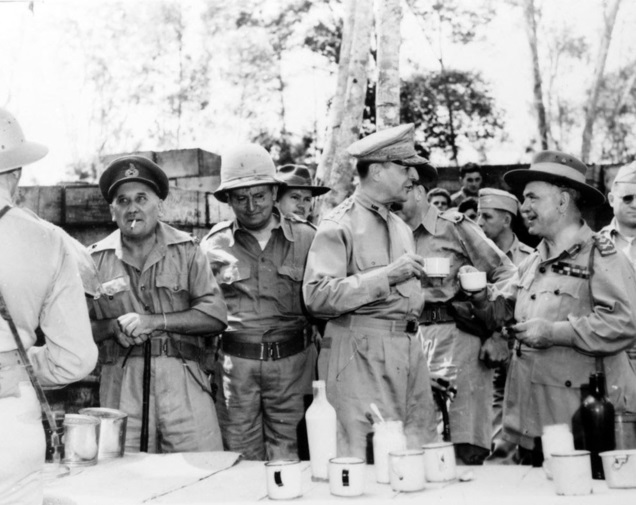
New Guinea. October 1942. A tea break at a canteen in the forward areas during a tour of inspection by US General, Douglas MacArthur. In the background, left to right, are: Major General G. S. Allen, Commander, Australian 7th Division AIF; Mr F. M. Forde, Australian Minister for the ArmyGeneral MacArthur, Supreme Commander, South West Pacific Area, and General Sir Thomas Blamey, Commander, Allied Land Forces. AWM150836

MacArthur, after being ordered to leave the Philippines, was appointed Supreme Commander of Allied Forces in the Southwest Pacific Area (SWPA). MacArthur had to compete with Admiral Chester Nimitz's plan to drive towards Japan through the central Pacific. When Port Moresby was threatened, he persuaded the Australian Prime Minister, John Curtin, to send the Australian General, Sir Thomas Blamey, commander of Allied Land Forces, to New Guinea. By this manoeuvre, MacArthur ensured that Blamey would be the scapegoat if Port Moresby fell.

==== View of Australian troops ====
MacArthur informed General George Marshall that, "the Australians have proven themselves unable to match the enemy in jungle fighting. Aggressive leadership is lacking." Jones observes, "The attitude that the Australians were poor fighters pervaded thinking at MacArthur's headquarters". As the Japanese were withdrawing, MacArthur became dissatisfied with the rate of advance of the 7th Division. On 8 October, Australian Major General Arthur Allen received a message from Blamey: "General MacArthur considers quote light casualties indicate no serious effort to displace enemy unquote. You will attack enemy with all speed at each point of resistance." Pressure from MacArthur was instrumental in persuading Blamey to relieve Allen and Australian Brigadier Arnold Potts of command.

==== Control of press ====
Ostensibly for security, the Australian Government had given MacArthur control over the media in respect to operations in the theatre. MacArthur used this power for self-promotion and to convince the US public that the war in the Pacific was being won by his actions. Press releases implied that he was personally directing the battles from the front when, in reality, he was in Brisbane or Melbourne. (Note: Jones discusses MacArthur's use of the press for self-promotion and the "untruths and misstatements" that emanated from his headquarters.) Victories at Milne Bay and Kokoda were attributed to the Allies, making the contribution of Australian forces ambiguous. Disguise this as he might, there was no paper-trail of the involvement of US troops: no medal recommendations, no casualty lists and no after action reports. "He could not let his superiors ... feel that the war in SWPA could be left to Australians." MacArthur felt pressure to produce a victory to secure his command and he needed American troops to produce it for him.

==== Demands results ====
Compounding the difficulties presented by the tactical situation was persistent pressure from General MacArthur's headquarters for the swift capture of the beachheads. MacArthur was driven to compete with the progress of Admiral William Halsey's Marines at Guadalcanal. There was also the threat that the Japanese could reinforce the beachhead positions.

MacArthur never visited the front during the campaign. He had no understanding of the conditions faced by his commanders and troops, yet he continued to interfere and pressure them to achieve unreasonable outcomes. On 20 November, MacArthur told Blamey that "all columns will be driven through to the objectives regardless of losses". The following day, he sent another missive to Harding, telling him to "take Buna today at all costs". Jones observed of MacArthur in the early stages of the war:

... most serious of General MacArthur's failings, he never got out from behind the desk to find out what was going on. On more than one occasion this failing was a life-or-death error for the troops at the front. Had MacArthur bothered to visit the Philippine Army in the field prior to the war he would have known they could not oppose the Japanese on the beaches. Had he regularly visited his troops on Bataan he would have realized that his troops were literally starving to death. Had he gone to the front in New Guinea, he would have seen the horrible combat conditions under which he directed his units forward "regardless of cost."

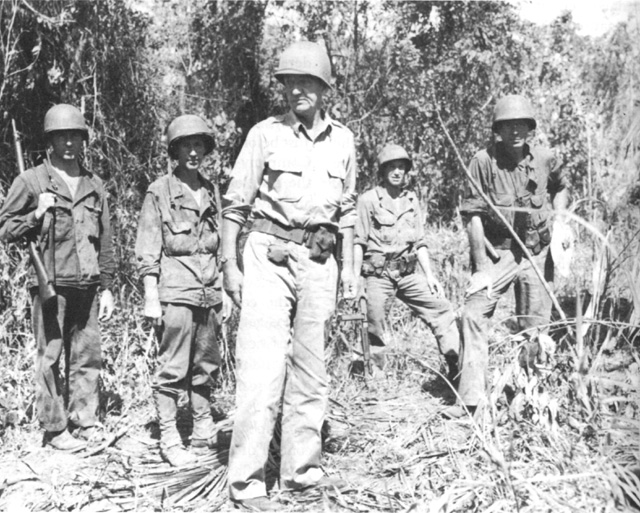
Eichelberger inspects newly taken ground in the Triangle area, near Buna Station. He was conspicuous in his presence close to the forward positions.

When MacArthur offered the US 41st Division as reinforcements for the advance on Gona, Blamey declined. He replied he would rather rely on his depleted 21st Brigade as he "knew they would fight". This was certainly payback for earlier denigrating statements by MacArthur about the fighting ability of Australian troops. Blamey was pleased with MacArthur's discomfort.

The jokes of the American officers in Australia, making fun of the Australian Army were told all over Australia. Therefore, when we've got the least thing on the American troops fighting in the Buna sector, our high command has gone to General MacArthur and rubbed salt into his wounds. [Major General Frank Berryman (Blamey's deputy chief of staff at the time and simultaneously acting chief of staff New Guinea Force while Blamey was in New Guinea) to Major General Eichelberger]

By 29 November, MacArthur had become frustrated at what he saw as poor performance by the 32nd Division, especially its commissioned officers. He told the US I Corps commander, Major General Robert L. Eichelberger:

Bob, I'm putting you in command at Buna. Relieve Harding ... I want you to remove all officers who won't fight. Relieve regimental and battalion commanders; if necessary, put sergeants in charge of battalions and corporals in charge of companies – anyone who will fight. Time is of the essence... Bob, I want you to take Buna, or not come back alive ... And that goes for your chief of staff, too.

MacArthur told Lieutenant General Edmund Herring GOC, New Guinea Force, "This situation is very serious. If we can't clear this up quickly I'll be finished and so will your General Blamey." MacArthur’s concerns were for his own personal future and his reputation. His constant exhortation for speed had led to the very situation he had feared. MacArthur was faced with a personal disaster, much of his own making.

After Harding was relieved of command, MacArthur continued to pressure Eichelberger to achieve results. Eichelberger recorded multiple instances when MacArthur urged him to hasten his efforts to rapidly defeat the Japanese. On 15 December, MacArthur sent his chief of staff, Richard K. Sutherland with authority to relieve Eichelberger and orders not to return until Buna was taken. He did return though, and made a strong report endorsing Eichelberger.

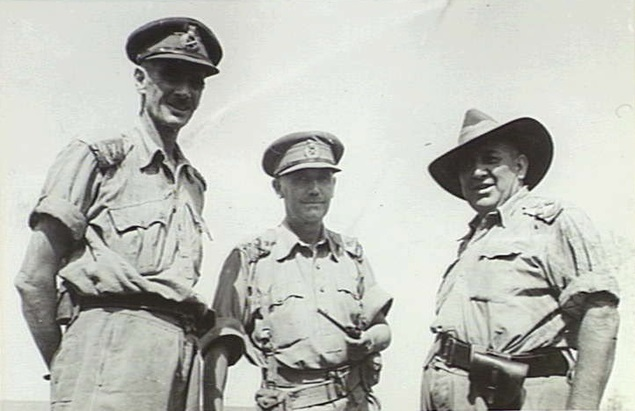
(L-R) Generals Vasey, Herring and Brigadier Wootten visiting the Sanananda front. AWM 014308

On Christmas Day, Sutherland delivered a letter to Eichelberger from MacArthur.

Where you have a company on your firing line, you should have a battalion; and where you have a battalion, you should have a regiment. And your attacks, instead of being made up of two or three hundred rifles, should be made up by two or three thousand... Your battle casualties to date compared with your total strength are slight so that you have a big margin to work with.

Vasey wrote of the pressure being applied: "For weeks and weeks now I have been trying to make bricks without straw, which in itself is bad enough, but which is made much worse when others believe you have the straw."

In public, MacArthur stated after the campaign's conclusion that, "There was no reason to hurry the attack because the time element was of little importance." (Note: In this press release MacArthur's headquarters announced that the losses had been low, less than half those of the enemy, battle casualties and sick included. It gave as the reason for this favorable result that there had been no need to hurry the attack because "the time element was in this case of little importance." Communique, United Nations Headquarters, Australia, 28 January 1943, in The New York Times, 29 January 1943. Eichelberger has written: "The statement to the correspondents in Brisbane after Buna that 'losses were small because there was no hurry' was one of the great surprises of my life. As you know, our Allied losses were heavy and as commander in the field, I had been told many times of the necessity for speed." Eichelberger to author, 8 March 1954, OCMH files (quoted by Milner).) He told the media, "The utmost care was taken for the conservation of our forces with the result that probably no campaign in history against a thoroughly prepared and trained Army produced such complete and decisive results with so low an expenditure of life and resources." Manchester comments that with this statement, MacArthur "stunned his victorious troops". Jones continues:

This is an absurdity and an outright lie. The battle of Buna (commonly referring to the Buna–Gona–Sanananda area) was one of the bloodiest battles of World War II [for US forces]. ... According to D. Clayton James, "the deepest resentment felt by the veterans of the Papuan Campaign was probably reserved for MacArthur's audacity in depicting the casualty rate as relatively light." These men were, James continued, the same veterans urged to "take all objectives regardless of cost."

Soldier and historian, Gordon Maitland, squarely attributes many of the Allied casualties to the pressure applied by MacArthur and contends that the pressure applied by him was for "his own publicity purposes". He reiterates criticisms that MacArthur failed to visit the front or gain an appropriate appreciation of the battlefield situation. Furthermore, he states that MacArthur caused attacks to be mounted without adequate preparation or support and that, in consequence of this and a failure to appreciate the strength of the Japanese position, such attacks were doomed to failure.

==== Alternative view ====
Historian, Peter Dean, acknowledges the general interpretation that the actions of MacArthur and Blamey leading up to and during the fighting at Buna, Gona and Sanananda were "to salvage their own positions at the expense of the troops" but offers an alternative rationale for insistent pressure being applied to achieve an early result. Dean reports that MacArthur, himself, was under pressure, citing a cable from the US Joint Chiefs to MacArthur of 16 October, "reminding him that they viewed the situation in Papua as 'critical'". Dean also notes that this coincided with the relief of Vice Admiral Robert Ghormley, Commander-in-Chief of US forces in the south Pacific who had operational control of the forces engaged at Guadalcanal.

Dean rationalises that MacArthur's actions were in the face of "complicated operational and strategic contexts", stating that, "an understanding of these contexts has been poorly done in most accounts of the fighting at Buna, Gona and Sanananda." This is encapsulated in correspondence from Brigadier General Chamberlin (MacArthur's operations chief) to Sutherland, of 30 October 1942: "the key to our plan of action lies in the success or failure of the South Pacific in holding Guadalcanal ..." (that is, that the position at Guadalcanal was tenuous). Dean also refers to a potential for the Japanese to deploy forces from Timor or Java.

The Naval Battle of Guadalcanal (12–15 November 1942) has been analysed as a defining event in the Guadalcanal Campaign. Dean states that: "While in hindsight this emphasis on speed from MacArthur downwards does not seem legitimate, at the time it remained a critical part of the considerations for the campaign at the beachheads, and these were only exacerbated by GHQ's original underestimation of Japanese strength in the area." Dean's analysis does not report the extent to which MacArthur was aware or otherwise of the strategic impact of events at Guadalcanal. Dean's rationale assumes that the position at Guadalcanal remained precarious, notwithstanding the capriciousness of war.

== Fire support ==
The role of field artillery (and fire support in general) in the attack is to destroy, neutralise or suppress the objective and supporting positions and to deny, delay or disrupt the enemy's capacity to support the objective positions while also preventing enemy artillery from fulfilling its role. It can also be used to deceive or cause the enemy to divert resources from the objective.

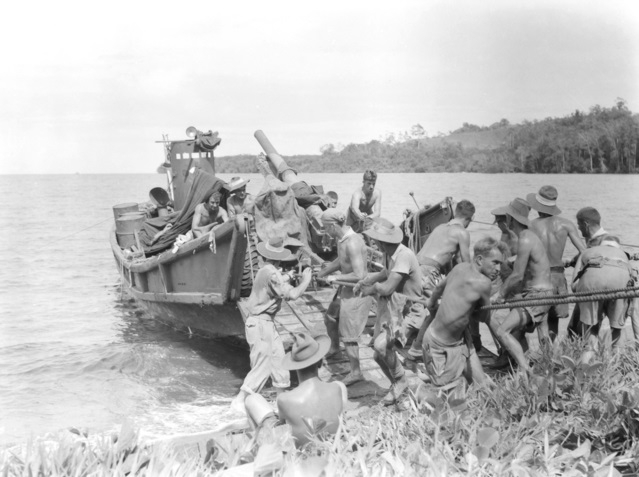
Gunners of the 2/5th Field Regiment manhandling a 25-pounder off a captured barge at Oro Bay.

Allied command had failed to make effective provision for supply of artillery or tanks as the Allied troops advanced on the Japanese positions at Buna–Gona. It was believed that air support could replace the need for these. The air support provided proved ineffective in achieving the effect required. Attacks by Allied troops were repeatedly stalled. Allied commanders in the field were unable to provide fire support capable of suppressing, let alone neutralizing the Japanese positions to an extent that would permit attacking infantry to close with and overwhelm them. Logistical limitations hindered attempts to make good the deficiency in artillery by either type, number of guns, or the availability of ammunition. While tanks were available, there was initially no means to transport them. Several authors have commented on the lack of naval support and either directly or indirectly referred to the potential of naval gunfire support. (Note: Milner, in his closing chapter on the battle, discusses naval support under a common heading, "Artillery, Air, and Naval Support". While he does not specifically mention the potential role of naval bombardment, there is a clear inference being made by the context.)

The problems of providing effective fire support, the solutions, and the lessons learned were fundamental in developing future Allied tactics and doctrine. The failure to make effective provision to support attacking infantry both protracted the battle and increased the Allied losses.

=== Artillery ===
The Allied forces commenced the battle on 19 November with two 3.7-inch mountain howitzers from the Australian 1st Mountain Battery which was in support of the US 32nd Division. A further mountain howitzer, from the Left Section of the battery, had been flown to Kokoda to support the 7th Division. (Note: McCarthy reports that a section (nominally two guns) had been deployed to Kokoda. On 5 December, this gun from the Left Section joined with the Right Section of the battery in support of the 32nd Division at Buna.) Also available in support were 3 in mortars, the US equivalent 81 mm mortar, the light 60 mm mortars in American use and the equivalent 2 in mortar in Australian use.

Using the one lugger that remained after the earlier attacks, two 25-pounders of the 2/5th Field Regiment arrived on 22 November to support the 32nd Division. On 23 November, two 25-pounders of the 2/1st Field Regiment were flown to Popondetta and a further two guns were also flown to Dobodura on the same day. This was the first move by air of 25-pounders in this theatre. The guns were not made to be transported in pieces as the components were heavy and there was a real danger of them going through the floor of the planes. Shortly after, two more guns arrived at each location. One 105-mm howitzer of Battery 'A', 129th US Field Artillery Battalion was landed at Dobodura on 29 November, taking three C-47 transports to move the gun, its crew and 200 rounds of ammunition.

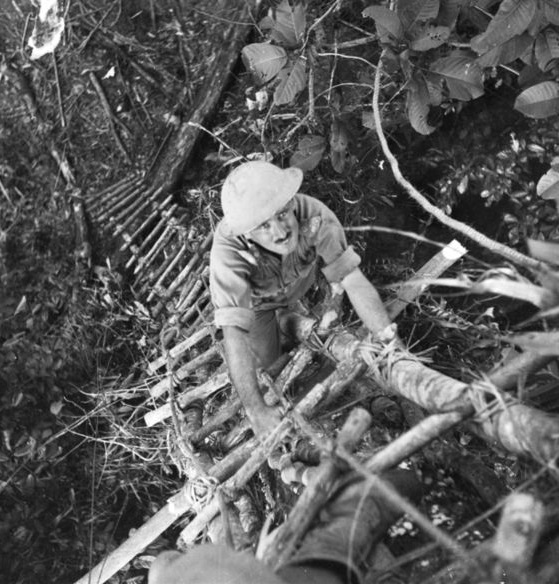
Flat terrain and thick vegetation made it a challenge to find suitable vantage points from which to direct fire. AWM013856

In context, a US infantry division would have an establishment of thirty-six 105 mm (4.1 in) howitzers and twelve 155 mm (6.1 in) howitzers in its four field artillery battalions. Each of the three infantry regiments had a cannon company with an establishment of six 75 mm (3 in) howitzers (Note: This entitlement was short lived, from August 1942 until early 1943.) and two 105 mm howitzers. An Australian division would have three field regiments (before adopting the jungle division establishment in 1943). Each regiment would have two or three batteries of 12 guns each. It could be expected that the two Allied divisions deployed might field between 144 and 180 artillery pieces. As a corps-level engagement, there may be additional non-divisional assets allocated, increasing the total of guns even further. Exacerbating this shortage in the number of guns was a severely limited supply of ammunition. The plan for the final attack at Gona on 8 December was only allocated 250 rounds of artillery. For another attack at Gona, Russell reports that only 40 rounds were allocated.

The task of destroying Japanese bunkers was found to be "beyond the scope of 25 prs". Brigadier General Waldron, the 32nd Division's artillery commander at the start of the battle, was more forthright. "The 25 pounders", he said, "annoyed the Japanese, and that's about all." The gun's flat trajectory and small explosive shell was not suited to destroying emplacements, but rather for fire support against exposed targets. (Note: A flat trajectory also made it more difficult to shoot through a tree canopy.) The high trajectory of the mountain howitzers was better suited to this task but, while a larger calibre, they fired a smaller 20 pound shell. The 3.7 in howitzer was considered accurate and capable of a high rate of fire; however, these particular guns were well worn, and accuracy was compromised as a consequence. Shells used by artillery were armed with instantaneous fuses, causing them to explode on impact. Hits achieved by the artillery were comparatively ineffective. With adequate observation, between 100 and 200 shells fired by four guns were needed to reduce a large emplacement. A delayed fuse, to postpone the explosion until the projectile had buried itself deep in the target, would have been much more effective. None were initially available, and when they were, their supply was limited. The Japanese defenders referred to delayed-fuse shells fired from the American 105 mm howitzer as "earthquake bombs". The Japanese defensive positions remained substantially proof against shell fire. The use of delayed fuses at Gona on 8 December was critical to the success of the 39th Battalion, when attacking troops spent two full minutes under their own artillery bombardment as they stormed Japanese positions.

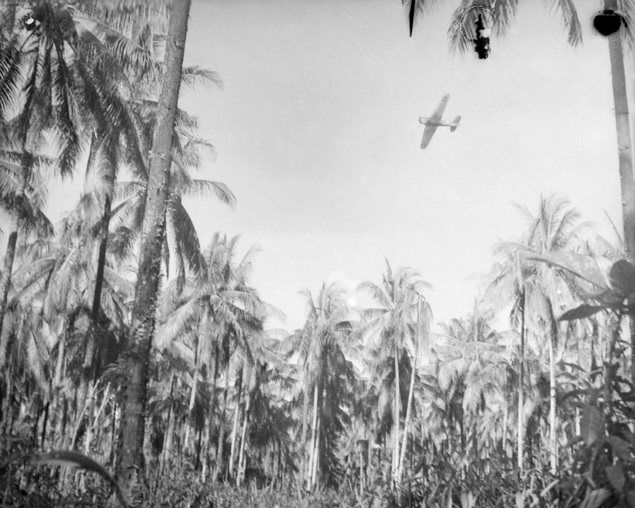
A Wirraway directing fire during an attack at Buna. AWM013954

The difficulties faced were not confined to the numbers of guns and the quantity of ammunition. The flat terrain, with dense jungle or open strips of tall grass, provided no vantage point from which to observe and adjust fire. Maps available for plotting targets were inaccurate and lacked detail. A workable map was constructed from air photos. Sound ranging was used in place of observation. By "skilful calculation", fire could be delivered to an accuracy of 200 yards (200 m). However, well-trained infantry would look to advance as near as 30 yards (25 m) to the fall of the shot. To improve visibility, forward observers would take to the trees, making them targets for Japanese snipers.

The solution to the problem of observation arrived on 28 November in the form of "slow, almost weaponless Wirraways" of No. 4 Army Cooperation Squadron, RAAF. One of these aircraft was allotted to the 32nd Division and one to the 7th Division, to work with the artillery, initially for two hours during each morning. So successful were these planes, their availability was quickly increased, operating from both Dobodura and Popondetta. They were used to adjust fire, to identify targets and to lure enemy AA into disclosing their positions so they could be attacked with counter-battery fire. It was a dangerous job as the Japanese ordered that these planes be made priority targets.

The number of guns available was increased over the course of the battle. Two more guns of the 2/5th Field Regiment arrived on 8 December. About 20 December, one troop of four QF 4.5-inch howitzers arrived. (Note: Two of these guns were flown to Dobodura on 20 December. Another two were transported by sea and landed at Hariko on 23 December. Milner gives the arrival of the first two guns as 18 December.) Eight guns of the 2/1st Field Regiment were landed at Oro Bay on 7 January. Milner compares the effectiveness of the 4.5-inch howitzer favourably with that of the 105 mm howitzer.

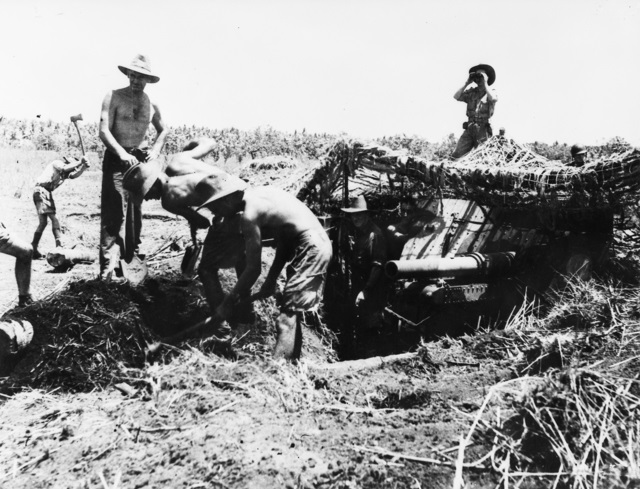
Carson's Gun, "Freddie One" placed between the airstrips at Buna. AWM014021

With more guns available, Eichelberger was able to risk bringing one of his guns closer. He believed it might be more effective firing from a forward position. A 25-pounder, "Freddie One" of the 2/5th Field Regiment, was tried in this experimental role. It became known as "Carson's Gun", after the detachment commander. It went into action on 27 December, sited forward of the bridge between the strips. Observation was from a 70-foot (20 m) high banyan tree some 1,300 yards (1,200 m) ahead of the gun, in the bush, off to the southern side of the strip. Solid, armour-piercing shot was generally used by this gun to lessen the risk of injury to the Allied infantry close to targets. The first shell disappeared through the 12-inch (300 mm) square embrasure of the target and destroyed the 75 mm gun which the strongpoint sheltered. The gun then fought a two-day duel with a triple-barrelled 25 mm piece. Carson's men claimed they eliminated three opposing crews before the 25 mm was completely silenced. The gun fired 1,000 rounds in five days. It silenced eleven bunkers. It claimed a further two 75 mm guns, a mountain gun and "many machine guns". Both the Americans and the Australians had experimented with lighter anti-tank guns in a similar way but without the same degree of success having been noted in either of the three principal sources. (Note: McCarthy refers to a 6-pounder (57 mm/2.24 in) of the 2/1st Anti-Tank Regiment being employed against positions on the Sanananda track. McCarthy is not specific as to when this occurred but it would appear to be some time shortly after 8 December. The Americans employed the lighter 37 mm anti-tank gun. Sources suggest canster rounds were commonly employed by the American gunners. The canister in this gun was employed effectively against Japanese in tree positions.)

Herring asserted that it was not the number of artillery pieces in action that was the limiting factor but rather, the supply of shells. It was not possible to provide enough shells for overwhelming artillery support without sacrificing the supply of other essentials like food, medical supplies and small arms ammunition. (Note: MacArthur reports that, "the flow of supplies and equipment [was restricted] to the barest essentials." The Center of Military History publication states that resupply was an "extraordinarily difficult problem throughout the operation" but especially so in the early part of the battle. All of the requests received at Port Moresby were marked urgent. McAuley notes that the Americans already gave precedence to ammunition over rations. Harding described the situation as, "hand-to-mouth". Blakeley states that: "Rations and medical supplies necessarily had precedence over artillery ammunition.") Author Peter Brune supports the assertion that pressure by MacArthur for results was a factor that increased Allied casualties, but argues that it was Herring's willingness to respond to such pressure that exacerbated the issue; he also argues that this pressure resulted in inadequate provisions being made to provide sufficient artillery pieces and shells. Continued pressure for early results meant that precious supplies of artillery ammunition were consumed rather than stockpiled for a concentrated effort. (Note: Milner writes, "the picture, especially in the final beachhead phase of operations, had been rather one in which the troops suffered heavy casualties while being hastily pressed forward in repeated attacks on prepared enemy positions with little more in the way of weapons than their rifles, machine guns, mortars, and hand grenades. ... hurrying the attack had become the leitmotiv of the campaign." Here, Milner was specifically referring to hast that had arisen from the pressure that had been applied by MacArthur. Troops were prematurely committed to attacks with a predictable lack of success leading to wastage of both manpower and material that might otherwise have been conserved and used more effectively. Firing was frequently restricted to conserve ammunition.)

=== Air support ===
Lieutenant General George Kenney, Commander of the Allied air forces in the Southwest Pacific Area, argued that artillery support was unnecessary. Although he had no knowledge of jungle warfare, he told MacArthur that tanks had no role in ground action in the jungle.

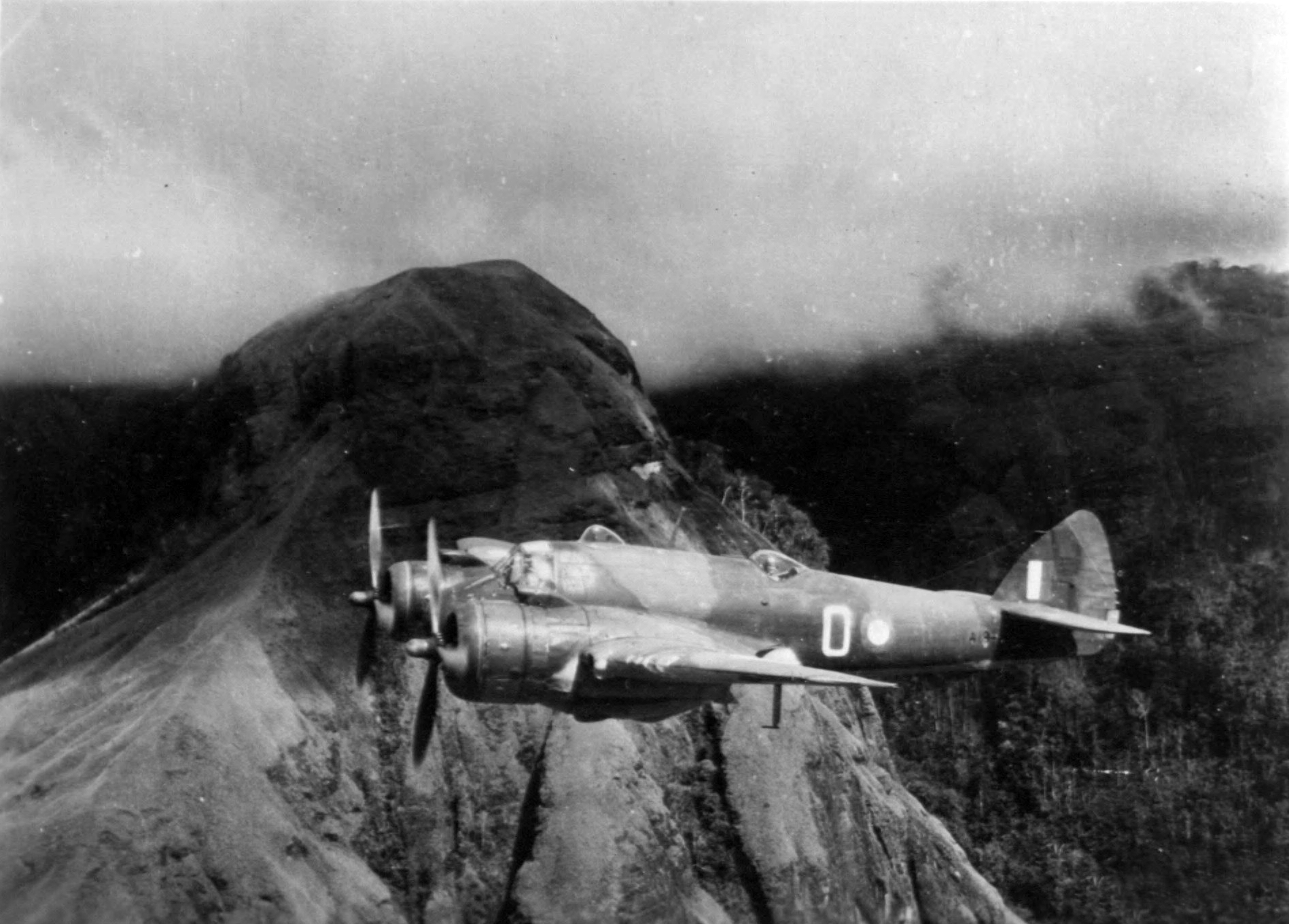
Beaufighter of No. 30 Squadron RAAF over the Owen Stanley Range, New Guinea, 1942

Tanks and heavy artillery can be reserved for the battlefields of Europe and Africa. They have no place in jungle warfare. The artillery in this theatre flies, the light mortar and machine guns, the rifle, the tommygun, the grenade and knife are the weapons carried by men who fly to war, jump in parachutes, are carried by gliders and who land from air transports on grounds which air engineers have prepared. [Lieutenant General George Kenney]

Kenney's optimism that air superiority would compensate for the shortages of artillery pieces and shells was misplaced. Aerial bombardment was even less effective at destroying the Japanese emplacements than artillery. Allied aircraft dropped 2,807 fragmentation bombs (28 tons) and 728 demolition bombs (124.5 tons) on Buna alone. Fragmentation had little effect against bunkers. The results of such heavy bombardments were much less than expected. A reliance on area bombing was, in part, to blame for this lack of success. Area bombing could not be used effectively against forward Japanese positions, particularly in support of an attack, as Allied troops needed to be withdrawn to a safe distance. (Note: Eichelberger considered that the Air Force could not provide effective close air support at this time without there being an unacceptable level of risk to attacking troops. From 22 December, American forces made no further requests for close air support. McCarthy recounts that, at Gona, Brigadier Ken Eather was told to withdraw his troops to a safe distance to "allow the air attackers full play". Vasey also commented on how forward troops had to be withdrawn to permit preparatory artillery bombardment, and how this advantaged the Japanese defenders. Watson and Rohfleisch record that vigorous patrolling occurred in the Giruwa area following 13 January and "the hand-to-hand fighting which resulted prevented any attempts at direct support by the air arm.")

The constant presence of Allied aircraft did, however, have a significant impact on the morale of the Japanese defenders. The diary of Private Kiyoshi Wada, garrisoned at Sanananda, recounted Allied strafing and bombing on a continual basis. On 1 January 1943, he wrote, "Not a single one of our planes flew overhead, and enemy strafing was very fierce". On the next day, he continued, "It would be good if two or three of our planes came over."

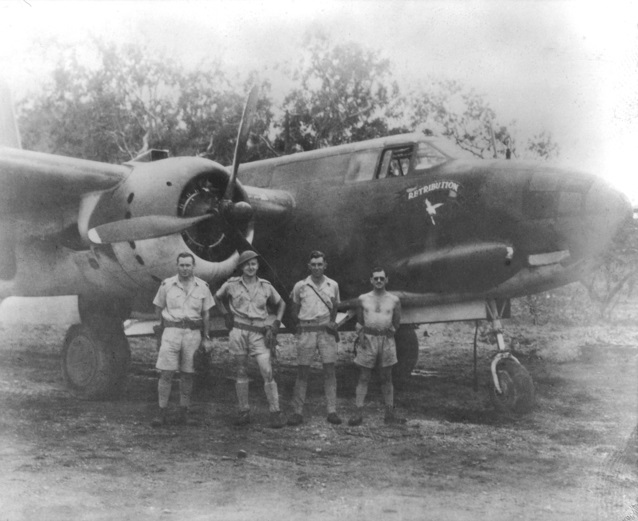
Squadron Leader K.R. McDonald (second from left) and his crew in front of their Boston bomber aircraft "Retribution" of No. 22 Squadron RAAF, which operated over Buna–Gona. AWM0G0078

The doctrine relating to the employment of close air support by Allied forces was in its infancy and the Buna–Gona battlefield posed particular problems due to the nature of the fighting and the terrain. The dense vegetation and camouflaged positions made identifying ground targets and distinguishing friendly positions extremely difficult. Procedures and protocols for co-ordination and control of close air support had not been developed. There were numerous instances of "friendly fire". (Note: "On at least six occasions, Fifth Air Force planes attacked their own troops and inflicted casualties.") This led to the development of procedures which differentiated between targets in "close support", requiring close co-ordination with ground troops, and "targets in depth", where the air force could operate freely, without risk of endangering friendly forces.

Despite this, air power played a major role in other areas. The campaign in Papua was the first military campaign to rely heavily on air transport and resupply. Air resupply was essential to the outcome of this battle. Air transport also expedited the evacuation of the sick and wounded. By the end of the year, around 6,000 men had been evacuated by air.

Air superiority was crucial to maintaining lines of communication, both air and sea, and providing air cover over the beachheads in support of Allied ground forces. The air force presence over the beachheads and at Rabaul was instrumental in severing the Japanese capacity to reinforce and resupply their positions. Bombing harassed Japanese forces landed in support of the beachheads near the mouths of the Mambare and Kumusi Rivers. These missions were supported with target identification by the coastwatchers, Lieutenant L.C. Noakes and Sergeant L.T.W. Carlson.

Most noteworthy, was the contribution of the Royal Australian Air Force (RAAF) Wirraways. On 26 November, two detached flights (four aircraft each) were based at the forward air fields at Popondetta and Dobodura These were the only planes to be based in the forward area. Their role of target identification and artillery observation was invaluable. They also provided reconnaissance, aerial photography and close air support. On 26 December, Flying Officer Jack Archer downed a Japanese Zero – the only such victory for the Wirraway. Of the Australian Wirraway crews, Eichelberger remarked: "I never hope to fight with braver men."

In tribute to the American Fifth Air Force and the RAAF, MacArthur said, "Their outstanding efforts in combat, supply, and transportation over both land and sea constituted the key-stone upon which the arch of the campaign was erected." The experiences at Buna–Gona were certainly a milestone in the developing role of air power in modern warfare. (Note: MacArthur went on to say, "They have set up new horizons for air conduct of the war.") MacArthur announced in a press release of 24 January 1943:

The destruction of the remnants of the enemy forces in the Sanananda area concludes the Papuan Campaign. The Horii Army has been annihilated. The outstanding military lesson of this campaign was the continuous calculated application of air power, inherent in the potentialities of every component of the Air Forces, employed in the most intimate tactical and logistical union with ground troops. The effect of this modern instrumentality was sharply accentuated by the geographical limitations of this theater. For months on end, air transport with constant fighter coverage moved complete infantry regiments and artillery battalions across the almost impenetrable mountains and jungles of Papua, and the reaches of the sea; transported field hospitals and other base installations to the front; supplied the troops and evacuated casualties. For hundreds of miles bombers provided all-around reconnaissance, protected the coast from hostile naval intervention, and blasted the way for the infantry as it drove forward. A new form of campaign was tested which points the way to the ultimate defeat of the enemy in the Pacific. The offensive and defensive power of the air and the adaptability, range and capacity of its transport in an effective combination with ground forces, represent tactical and strategical elements of a broadened conception of warfare that will permit the application of offensive power in swift, massive strokes, rather than the dilatory and costly island-to-island advance that some have assumed to be necessary in a theater where the enemy's far-flung strongholds are dispersed throughout a vast expanse of archipelagos. Air forces and ground forces were welded together in Papua and when in sufficient strength with proper naval support, their indissoluble union points the way to victory through new and broadened strategic and tactical conceptions. (Note: This press release says much about MacArthur. It is, perhaps, as much about self-promotion as it is about praising the efforts of the Air Forces. It states that artillery battalions were moved by air; a claim which was clearly false. The number of guns moved by air in support of the battle fell just short of the number in one artillery battalion nor did it include the heavier 155 mm howitzers that would be part of a division's artillery. It exaggerates (by omission and inference) the capacity of air resupply to sustain the needs of the forces deployed and of the capacity of air power to provide effective close air support. The phrasing relegates the future employment of naval forces to a lesser role. It is possibly indicative of territorial differences between MacArthur and Nimitz and of MacArthur's "lack of love" for the US Navy. (Note: The enmity can be attributed, at least in part, to MacArthur becoming aware that Admiral Ernest King opposed his appointment as Supreme Commander, South West Pacific Area.) One might also consider the prudence of MacArthur's statements, to the extent that they might indicate the Allies' policy, strategy, intentions and tactics for future operations. (Note: MacArthur was admonished by Marshall, Chief of Staff of the United States Army for press releases with the potential to have severely compromised Allied operations. In one instance, sufficient information was disclosed to potentially reveal that Japanese codes had been broken by the Allies. Jones (citing James) records that this was not an isolated incident and that "MacArthur's headquarters continued to dispatch numerous leaks".))

Putting the lessons of the battle in their "proper perspective", Kenney, in a letter to Lieutenant General Henry H. Arnold, Chief of Air Corps, said, "we learned a lot and the next one will be better."

=== Role of armour ===
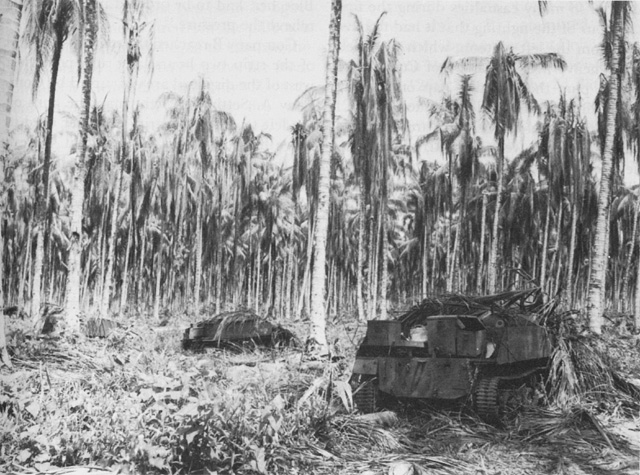
Disabled Bren carriers in the Duropa Plantation.

Artillery and air power were unable to provide sufficiently effective close support to the infantry. Commanders looked to the tank to break the stalemate that had developed. Although the expectation of Australian commanders had generally been similar to the American view that resistance in the Buna area would be light, provision had been made to support the operation with tanks. On 13 November, orders were given to dispatch a troop of the 2/6th Armoured Regiment, equipped with M3 Stuart tanks, from Milne Bay. When the first tank was loaded onto the only available craft, a captured barge, both barge and tank sank. There was no immediate prospect of moving the tanks. As a temporary measure, a platoon of Bren carriers were sent instead.

The carriers had been designed for reconnaissance and the rapid transport of troops and weapons across bullet-swept ground. Their light armour was intended to stop small-arms fire but not from close range. They were not provided with overhead protection. Doctrine was that carriers were not tanks and, "should not, indeed could not, be used as such." Each was armed with two Bren guns: One fired forward through a simple firing slit and the second was unmounted. Five carriers were brought forward from Porlock Harbour to participate in the attack on the morning of 5 December. These were manned by crews from the 2/5th Battalion and the 2/7th Battalion. This was a general attack by Warren force, at the eastern end of the Buna position. The carriers were assigned to the left flank at Duropa plantation, by the water's edge. They were to support the III/128th Battalion. One carrier was hit by a mortar round but fought on until its engine failed. The others became bellied on fallen logs. The crews were attacked by tree-top snipers or with grenades tossed into their carrier's open top. The five vehicles had been immobilized within half an hour. The losses only served to confirm doctrine: that carriers were no substitute for tanks. Attacking troops were pinned down by heavy fire and withdrew to their original positions.

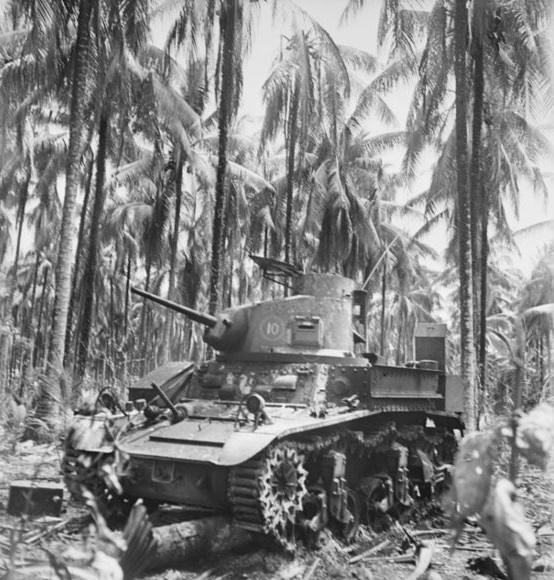
An M3 tank bellied on a log and temporarily disabled. The original source indicates that this log had been deliberately intended as an improvised tank trap. An anti-tank mine had been placed beside the log. AWM013932

Eight Stuart tanks of the 2/6th Armoured Regiment were transported in two lifts by the Karsik, from Milne Bay. This was immediately preceding commencement of Operation Lilliput. Their arrival coincided with that of 18th Brigade. The M3 Stuart was a light tank intended for the cavalry roles of reconnaissance and exploitation. The tank was only lightly armoured. Its strengths were speed and mobility. The tank's cross-country performance was severely limited in close country or boggy conditions. It was armed with a relatively light 37 mm high velocity gun. It had a .30 calibre machine gun co-axially mounted and a second, ball mounted in the front of the hull. A third was provided for an external anti-aircraft mount. By conventional wisdom, it was ill-suited as an infantry support tank and not designed to operate in this role. Infantry tanks were more heavily armoured and relatively slow. For these reasons, the M3s were likened to "race horses harnessed to heavy ploughs". It lacked an external phone for communication with supporting infantry and the crews were not trained for combined arms operations.

The Stuarts were committed in much the same location as the Bren carriers. They were to support the attack by the 2/9th Battalion on 18 December. Operational orders were issued prior to the battle outlining some basic visual signals for infantry to use to communicate with the tanks. However, signals were often missed by the crews because the tanks had poor visibility. No time was given for rehearsal or liaison between the tank crews and supporting infantry. Much was left to the ingenuity of the crews and the infantry as the battle developed. Communications between infantry and tanks, and between the tanks themselves, was very difficult. The wireless sets in the tanks were practically useless in combat. American hand-held wirelesses were tried but the operators drew too much fire from Japanese snipers. Targets were identified by firing flares or by getting the attention of the tank crew by simply climbing on board.

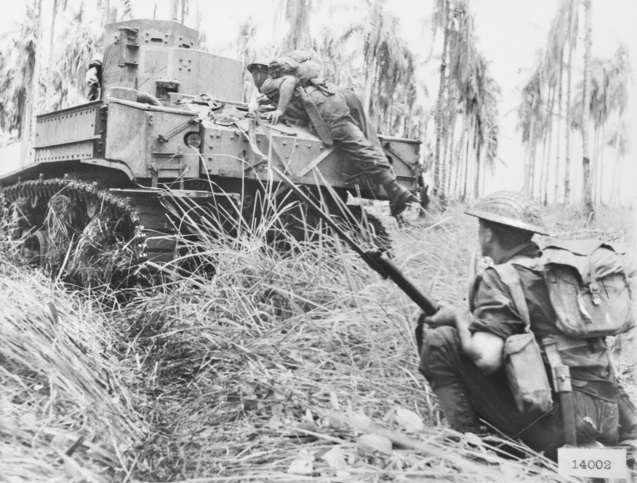
A corporal climbs aboard a tank to direct its fire during an attack at Buna. AWM 014002

The plantation was littered with coconut logs and stumps which were concealed by the undergrowth. At least two tanks were bellied on logs and immobilised. Japanese infantry showed little fear, attacking the tanks with petrol bombs and setting fires under tanks that had bellied. Mutual support between tanks and infantry was essential in achieving success. Two tanks were burnt-out after the first days fighting. When the tanks withdrew to rearm and refuel, the infantry were left exposed to counter-attack. From this lesson, it was found best to keep a number of tanks in reserve so that the armoured presence could be maintained when refuelling or rearming was required or a tank was disabled.

From 18 December until 2 January, when the Buna position was finally captured, the tanks continued to provide invaluable support. First, the strip of land from the plantation to the mouth of Simemi Creek was cleared. Then, on the southern side of the creek, from the new strip, along the length of the old strip towards the Triangle was cleared. A link with Urbana force was made at Giropa.

29 December was marred by errors. The supporting tanks failed to arrive at the start line until hours after they were due. They then bought fire to bear on attacking troops of the 2/9th Battalion, forcing them from the positions they had captured. These particular tanks had only just arrived from Milne Bay. Inexperience of the crews, unfamiliar with conditions on the battlefield, and assumptions in command and coordination undoubtedly contributed to these events.

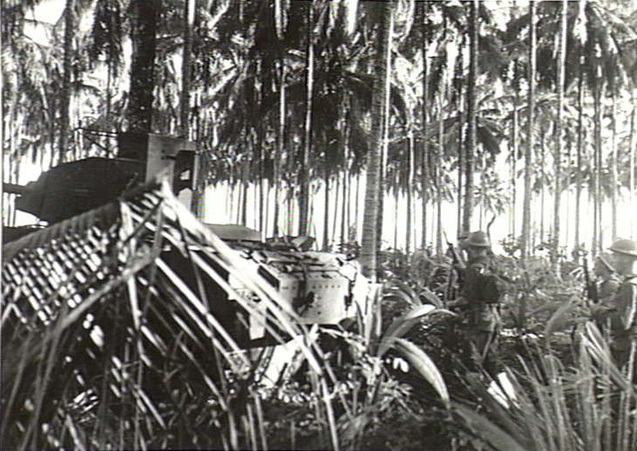
Tanks and infantry in action near Giropa Point. The tank's performance was limited by close country. AWM013961

The tanks were confined to operating on firm ground. On more than one occasion, tanks became bogged and attacks had to proceed with limited or no tank support. On 20 December, as the 2/9th Battalion emerged from the plantation near Strip Point, two of the four tanks bogged and were held fast. The left and centre companies had to continue the attack without tank support. Only on the right, by the coast, was it firm enough for the remaining tanks to operate.

The tanks were vulnerable to Japanese anti-aircraft guns employed in an anti-tank role. On 24 December, four Stuarts advanced over the open ground of the Old Strip. They were knocked out in quick succession by a Japanese 75 mm anti-aircraft gun. It was thought that this gun had been disabled when it had actually been maintaining silence as a ruse. It was hoped that an attack with tanks on 12 January would break the deadlock that had developed on the Sanananda Track. The terrain was entirely unsuited to their use. They were channelled along a narrow track by the dense growth to either side. The three tanks engaged advanced no more than 60 yards (50 m) before a well-concealed Japanese anti-tank gun opened fire. It promptly knocked out all three tanks. Without room to manoeuvre, they were easily targeted. The attack, involving the three battalions of the 18th Brigade failed.

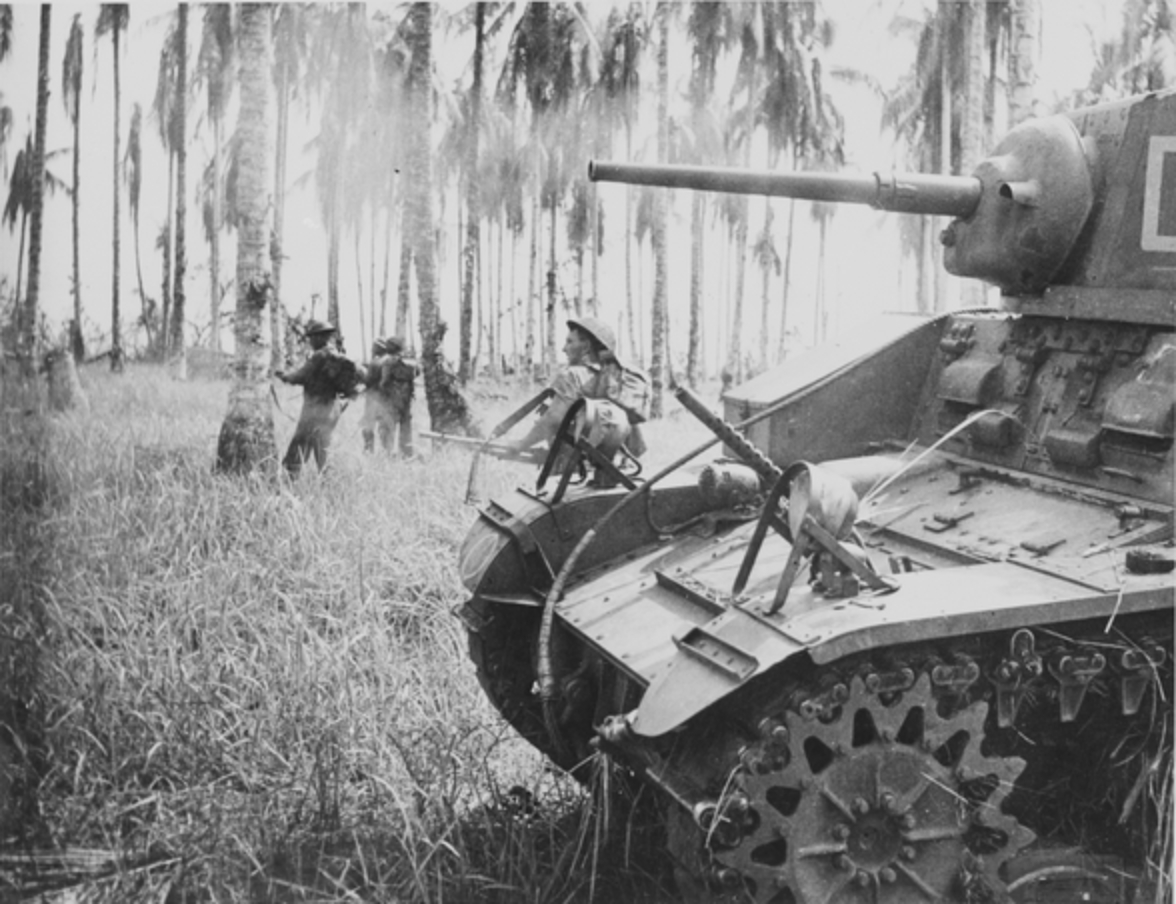
An M3 of the 2/6th Armoured Regiment supports infantry advancing through a coconut grove at Buna. Note the machine gun which is firing upward into the trees against snipers. AWM014008

Referring to the use of tanks at Buna–Gona, the American historian, Mayo notes in On Beachhead and Battlefront: "These tanks, and those following a few days later, had little effect on the battle for Buna ... " (Note: In making this statement, Mayo reports citing McCarthy. A review of McCarthy, does not support this conclusion. At Buna, McCarthy observes that they were ill-suited to the task by design (hence the simile McCarthy uses) and that there were issues, such as communication, to be overcome. He does not conclude that they had little effect. It may, perhaps, be valid to assert that they had little effect at the Sanananda Track. There, they were defeated by anti-tank fire that had not been neutralized and by terrain that was unsuitable for their employment. Even so, the outcome may well have been different but for the anti-tank fire.) but this is contrary to the opinion of other authors. (Note: Anderson states: "The tanks immediately proved their worth".) While the role of the tanks at Buna may not have been decisive or critical to the outcome of the battle, they did, nonetheless, make a valuable contribution. They were able to destroy or neutralize Japanese positions, allowing the supporting infantry to overwhelm them in a way that neither artillery nor air power had been able to achieve. Where tanks were able to be employed, greater gains were made with fewer losses. However, the effective use of tanks was constrained by terrain.

=== Naval support ===
The efficacy of naval bombardment against shore targets and in support of amphibious or land operations in coastal areas is well documented. Allied ships in the south-west Pacific were heavily committed to supporting the Guadalcanal Campaign, which was strongly opposed by the Imperial Japanese Navy for its duration. The Naval Battle of Guadalcanal was fought between 12–15 November. Heavy losses were incurred by both navies. The scant force of remaining destroyers not committed there, were thinly spread in the essential role of convoy escorts or patrolling the Coral Sea.

On 19 November, Blamey sent a communication through MacArthur and tried to persuade Vice-Admiral Arthur S. Carpender (USN), Commander South-West Pacific Force, to provide support. "The bulk of the land forces in New Guinea have had to move into positions where it is impossible to support them and extremely difficult to give them the necessary ammunition and supplies to maintain them." Carpender would not commit destroyers to the mission in poorly charted, reef strewn waters limiting their manoeuvre and sea room under air attack and suggested corvettes and night approach the best plan—one instituted in Operation Lilliput. On 8 December, Blamey directed a further request to MacArthur.

This requires at least two destroyers and two corvettes. I understand that the Navy is reluctant to risk its vessels. I desire to point out that the Navy is only being asked to go where the Japanese have gone frequently. Further there does not appear to be great risk in making an immediate reconnaissance both by sea and air by naval officers to select a reasonably safe route in view of the daily protection given by our Air Force. Enemy destroyers when bombed in the vicinity of the proposed landing have moved freely in these waters without meeting with disasters from reefs or other sea dangers. Preparations for the operation will be continued but unless the Navy is prepared to cooperate the risks are great owing to the reduced numbers that can be transported. It is somewhat difficult to understand the Navy attitude of non-cooperation because of risk. "Safety First" as a Naval motto — Shades of Nelson.

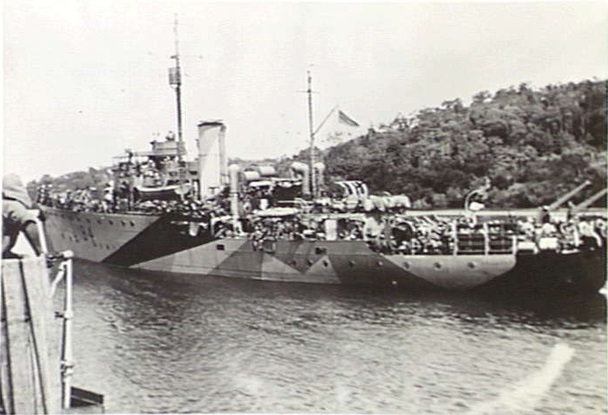
HMAS Ballarat at McLaren Harbour, New Guinea with troops of the 2/9th Battalion embarked for Buna, 14 December 1942. While destroyers could not be spared, corvettes of the Bathurst class were made available, performing escort and transport duties.

By so writing, Blamey evidences he was "out of his depth", and had made serious mistakes in his assumptions regarding such naval forces, for example stating, "the navy is only being asked to go where the Japanese have frequently gone." The Japanese had never operated large ships in the waters between Milne Bay and Buna. Japanese ships making attacks on Milne Bay had used a route avoiding that passage. They had access to the pre-war route from Rabaul and could approach Buna–Gona from the north. The main concern for Carpender was not the vicinity of Buna–Gona but the approach route.

These requests that were made were for transport and escort duties and not in direct support of the battle. James commented that if the Allies had provided only a token naval force, the capture of Buna–Gona would have been completed within a few weeks instead of months. A small force however, even if it could have been provided, would likely have been severely threatened by Japanese air, surface and submarine forces operating out of Rabaul. It would likely have lacked the capacity to both counter these threats and effectively operate in a fire support role.

== Order of battle ==
American forces deployed included service units but were largely bereft of supporting arms units. (Note: Sources consulted do not give a clear picture of the support units deployed with the American infantry. On the other hand, sources are available which list Australian support units in detail. These details have been omitted in deference to their American counterparts. Sources give strengths and losses for units at various stages throughout the battle. Figures have been reported here where sources give a clear indication of a unit's strength upon entering the battle and losses incurred over the course of its engagement in the battle.) Australian units were well below establishment, especially those that had come directly from fighting along the Kokoda Track. Most other Australian units deployed to the beachheads had already been engaged in fighting in New Guinea. The 36th and 49th Militia battalions, which had not seen previous active service at all, were significantly under strength before being deployed forward. The 49th Bn arrived with a strength of 505 all ranks. The establishment strength of an Australian battalion at this time was 910 troops including all ranks. The American forces were deployed to New Guinea at something close to their full strength and, notwithstanding sickness, arrived on the battlefield with a force much closer to their establishment than the Australian forces. (Note: The 126th Regimental Combat Team deployed from Brisbane by ship on 18 September. It embarked 180 officers and 3,610 enlisted men. On 14 November, the division's forward strength was reported as 6,951. The forward strength consisted of the 126th and 128th Regimental Combat Teams and the forward echelon of division headquarters.) The Americans deployed a total of 13,645 troops to the combat zone. It is estimated that the Australians deployed in excess of 7,000 troops. (Note: No precise figure has been identified. An estimate has been made from the strengths of the individual units identified herein. Where no strength has been reported, It has been assumed that the strength was similar to other units in the brigade (e.g., the strength of the 49th Bn is representative of the other two battalions of the 30th Bde). The strength of the 39th Bn was estimated at 300, based on strengths reported for battalions in the 21st Bde and considering that the battalion had seen similar service to these. The estimate does not include the strengths of supporting units nor does it include reinforcements made to individual units during the battle.) The Papuan Infantry Battalion patrolled in the vicinity for Japanese stragglers from the Kokoda Track Campaign but was not engaged directly in the battle. The contribution of Papuans conscripted as labourers or porters was a significant part of the Allied logistic effort. More than 3,000 Papuans worked to support the Allies during the battle. (Note: Nelson reports that by the end of 1942, 5,500 men were employed by the ANGU in the Buna area.)

=== US units ===
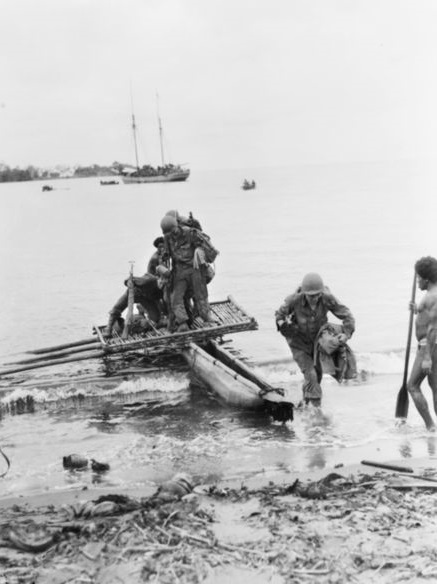
Troops of I/128th Bn being moved ashore at Oro Bay in outrigger canoes from the ketch in the background. AWM069274

Headquarters, US I Corps Commanding General (CG) Lt Gen Robert Eichelberger

==== Infantry ====
32nd Division (Maj Gen Edwin F. Harding)

126th Infantry Regimental Combat Team

III/126th Battalion detached to 7th Division at Sanananda Track

Strength on 21 November: 56 officers and 1268 other ranks.
Returned to command 9 January with a strength of 165 all ranks.

128th Infantry Regimental Combat Team
127th Infantry Regimental Combat Team

Arrived from 4 December (advance elements)
III/127th Bn Arrived 9 December
II/127th Bn Arrived by 17 December
I/127th Bn Arriving from 17 December

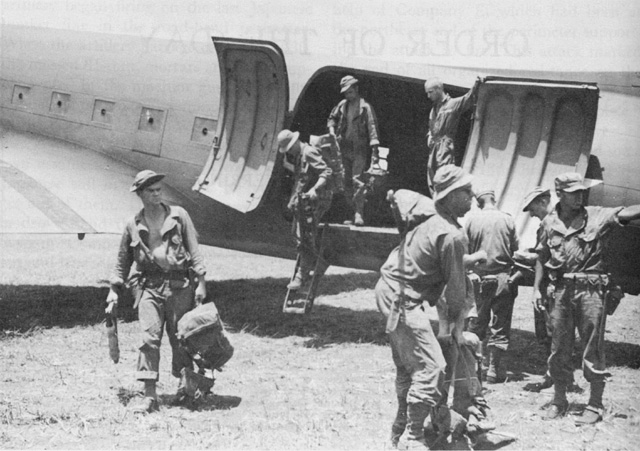
41st Division troops arriving at Dobodura airstrip 4 February 1943.

41st Division (Maj Gen Horace H. Fuller)

163rd Infantry Regimental Combat Team

Arrived 30 December

==== Artillery ====
Battery 'A', 129th Field Artillery Battalion: One 105-mm howitzer

Arrived about 29 November (Note: McCarthy and Milner record it arrived on 29 November. Gillison records that it was landed on the 26th. The Center of Military History publication records it had arrived by 26 November.)

=== Australian units ===
Headquarters 7th Division

General Officer Commanding (GOC) Maj Gen G. A. Vasey

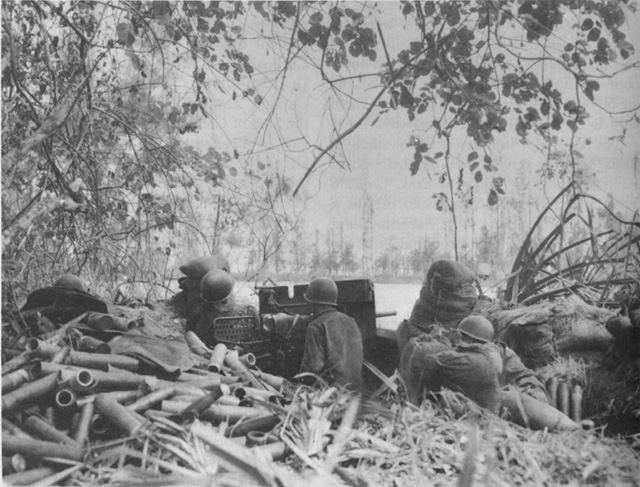
A 37mm anti-tank gun in action at Buna Government Station

2/7th Cavalry Regiment (Cav Regt)

Trained and employed as infantry.
Arrived 16 December. Strength – 350 all ranks.

2/6th Armoured Regiment

A composite squadron of 19 M3 Stuart tanks

==== Infantry ====
25th Brigade AIF

The brigade had been committed to fighting along the Kokoda Track since 13 September.
Withdrawn to Port Moresby on 4 December.

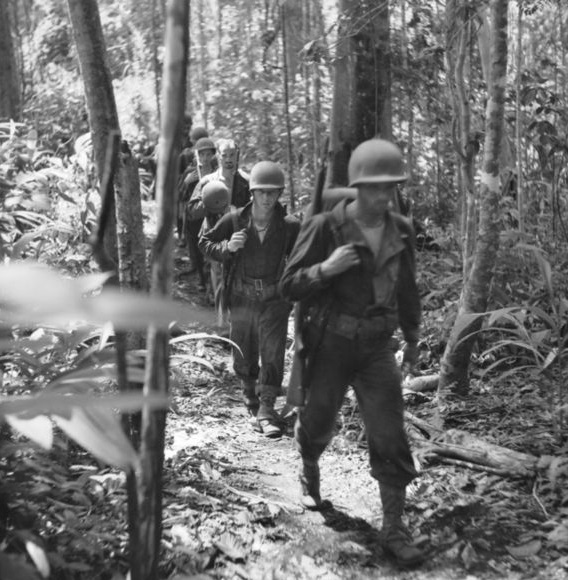
Soldiers of the 128th Inf Regt on the move at Wanigela as they head towards Buna.

2/25th Infantry Battalion.

Strength on withdrawal: 15 officers and 248 other ranks.

2/31st Infantry Battalion

Strength on withdrawal: 9 officers and 197 other ranks.

2/33rd Infantry Battalion

Strength on withdrawal: 8 officers and 170 other ranks.

3rd Infantry Battalion AMF (attached)

Returned to fighting on Kokoda Track on 3 November
20 November – Strength 179 all ranks

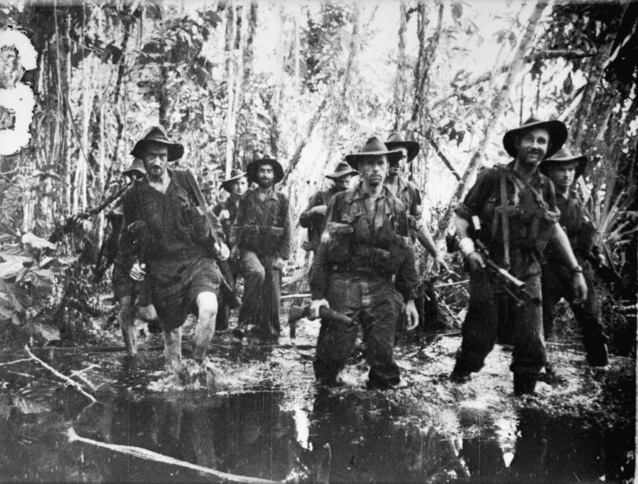
Troops were continually faced with having to move and fight through the mud and slush of the swamp around Buna-Gona. AWM013971

Chaforce (attached)

A composite force initially formed in September from the fitter men of the 21st Brigade and initially numbering about 400.
Initial strength of each company by parent battalion at the start of the battle:
2/14 Bn – 6 officers and 103 other ranks.
2/16 Bn – 6 officers and 103 other ranks.
2/27 Bn – 6 officers and 105 other ranks.

16th Brigade AIF

The brigade had been committed to fighting on the Kokoda Track since 20 October

2/1st Infantry Battalion

18 November – Strength 320 all ranks.
Withdrawn to Port Moresby 17 December. Strength: 105 all ranks.

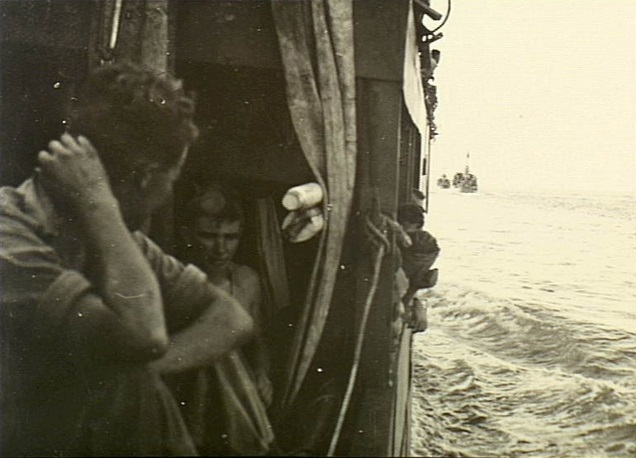
At sea, off Papua. 1942-12-14. A photograph taken from HMAS Broome, with the Australian corvettes Ballarat and Colac ahead, all three ships heading towards Buna to disembark troops of the 18th Bde. AWM041250

2/2nd Infantry Battalion

2/3rd Infantry Battalion

18th Brigade AIF

Initially attached to 32nd Division at Buna

2/9th Infantry Battalion

Arrived 16 December. Strength: 26 officers and 638 other ranks.

2/10th Infantry Battalion

Arrived 19 December. Strength: 34 officers and 648 other ranks.

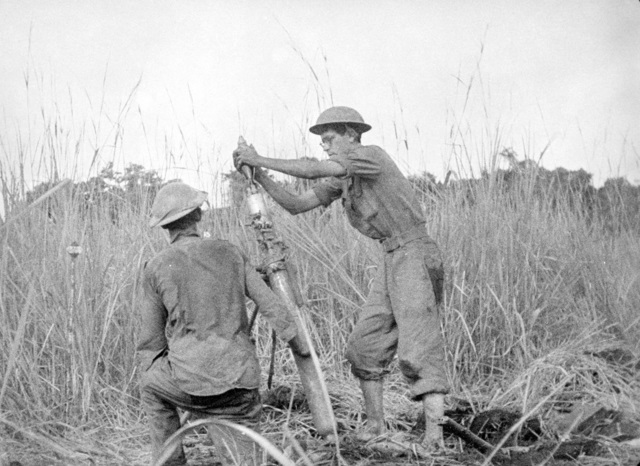
An Australian mortar crew firing, Sanananda, January 1943. AWM030258

2/12th Infantry Battalion

Arrived 30 December. Strength – 33 officers and 582 other ranks.

21st Brigade AIF

2/14th Infantry Battalion

Arrived 25 November – 350 all ranks

2/16th Infantry Battalion

Arrived 29 November. Strength – 22 officers and 251 other ranks.

2/27th Infantry Battalion

Arrived from 25 November. Strength – 21 officers and 353 other ranks.

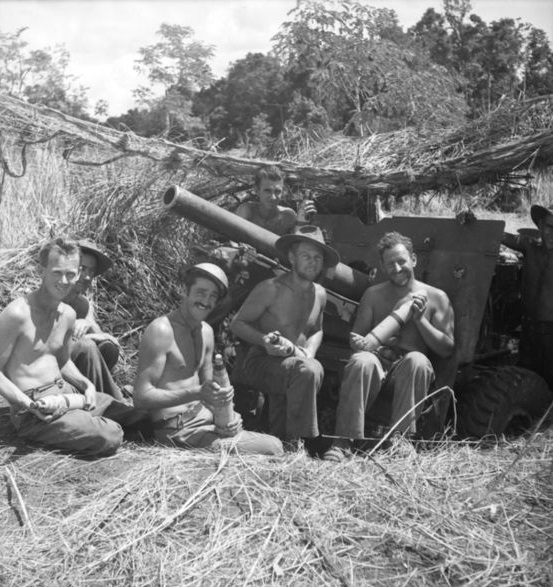
An Australian 25-pounder gun crew. AWM 013855

30th Brigade AMF

36th Infantry Battalion

Arrived from 15 December.

49th Infantry Battalion

Arrived 4 December. Strength – 24 officers and 481 other ranks

55/53rd Infantry Battalion

Arrived 5 December

14th Brigade AMF

Headquarters arrived 31 December. The allocation of battalions to the two AMF brigades had been blurred. The 36th Bn and 55/53rd Bn were more properly part of this brigade and returned to its command.

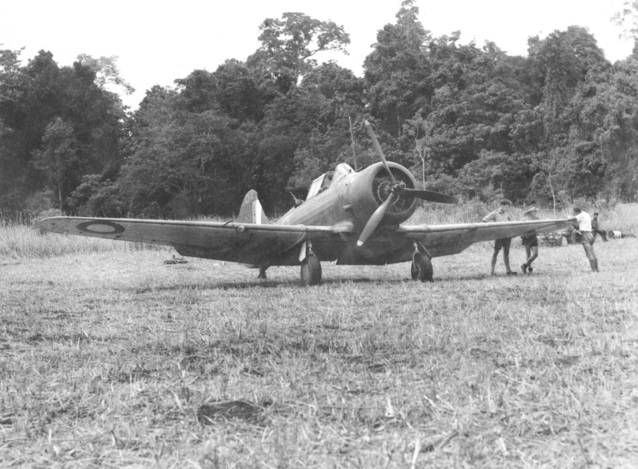
A Wirraway of No. 4 Sqn RAAF at Popondetta strip. One flight was detached forward to Popondetta and another to Dobodura. AWMP00484.001

2/6th Independent Company

Attached to 32nd Division, Warren Force.
Flew to Wanigela in mid October and then marched to Pongani to link up with the advance of 32nd Division.
Strength when bought forward on 20 November – 9 officers and 109 other ranks.
Withdrawn to Port Moresby 11 December

39th Infantry Battalion AMF

Arrived 2 December.

==== Artillery ====
One troop 2/5th Field Regiment (Fd Regt): four 25-pounders

One battery 2/1st Field Regiment (Attached): twelve 25-pounders

One troop 13th Field Regiment (Attached): four 4.5 in howitzers

1st Mountain Battery (Attached): three 3.7-inch mountain howitzers (Note: Milner states that the mountain howitzers ran out of ammunition on 26 December and "could take no further part in the fighting." McCarthy confirms that they ran out of ammunition on this day but does not make it clear that this concluded their involvement in the battle.)

See artillery section for details of deployment.

==== Air ====
No. 4 Squadron RAAF (two detached flights)

== See also ==
- Battle of Buna–Gona: Japanese forces and order of battle
