= Battle of Buna–Gona: Japanese forces and order of battle =

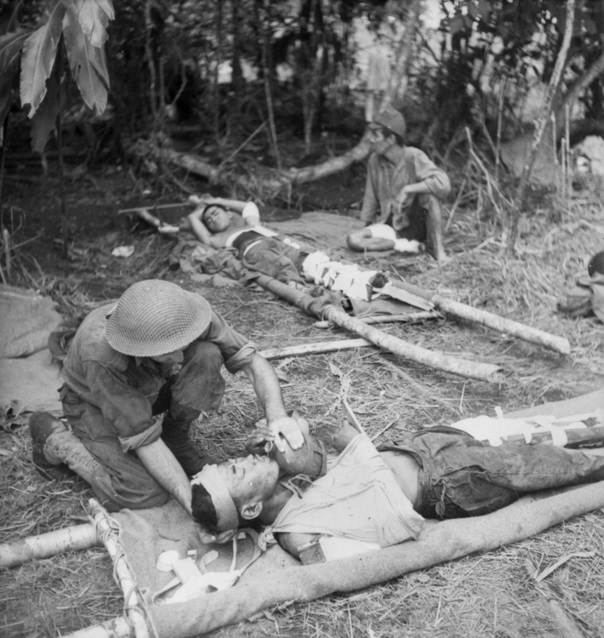
Wounded Japanese receive treatment after the final attack at Gona. AWM 013880 (Note: Australian War Memorial.)

The battle of Buna–Gona was part of the New Guinea campaign in the Pacific theatre during World War II. It followed the conclusion of the Kokoda Track campaign and lasted from 16 November 1942 until 22 January 1943. The battle was conducted by Australian and United States forces against the Japanese beachheads at Buna, Sanananda and Gona.

The Japanese forces at the start of the Battle of Buna–Gona had an effective strength of 5,500 or 6,500 after the landing of reinforcements on the night of 18 November 1942. The total force at the start of the battle is estimated at 9,000 and included several hospitals, their patients and labour units from the army and navy. The Japanese defensive positions at Buna, Gona and forward at the Sanananda track junction had been strongly developed before the arrival of the Allied forces. They have been described as some of the strongest encountered by the Allies in the course of the war. They made excellent use of terrain, which limited the tactical possibilities for attackers and consisted of hundreds of bunkers and machine gun emplacements developed in depth.

Many survivors of the Kokoda campaign congregated to the west near the mouth of the Kumusi River and linked up with Japanese reinforcements that were landed there in early December. This force actively threatened the western flank of the Australians at Gona. Sources give the total of Japanese forces deployed to Buna–Gona or operating to the west in the vicinity of the Kumusi and Membare Rivers as between 11,000 and nearly 12,000.

In mid December, there was nearly 10,000 deployed at the beachhead positions. Just before the fall of Sanananda and the battle ended, 1,200 wounded were evacuated by submarine. Estimates indicate a similar number were able to escape overland. Only about 250 prisoners were taken. The remainder, some 7,000 to 8,000, were killed.

== Defences ==
Before the Allied forces arrived on the Buna–Gona coast, Richard K. Sutherland, then major general and chief-of-staff to General Douglas MacArthur, Supreme Commander of Allied Forces in the Southwest Pacific Area, had "glibly" referred to the Japanese coastal fortifications as "hasty field entrenchments." After the battle, Lieutenant General Robert Eichelberger, Commanding General US I Corps, (Note: On 29 November, Eichelberger was ordered forward by MacArthur to take direct command of US forces engaged at Buna and, from 12 January, commanded the combined Allied forces.) called the Japanese utilisation of terrain "perfect" and "brilliant". (Note: Eichelberger was to refer to the situation as a "Leavenworth nightmare", which is a reference to the United States Army Command and General Staff College based at Fort Leavenworth.) Natural obstacles were used to advantage to channel attackers into coordinated fields of fire. The Japanese defensive positions at Buna–Gona have been described as "one of the most impressive defensive networks seen in the entire war." They consisted of hundreds of bunkers and machine gun emplacements. The positions had been skilfully developed in accordance with the principles of defence. They made excellent use of terrain, which limited the tactical possibilities for attackers. The defences were developed in depth. Individual positions were mutually supporting and alternative positions were used to confound attackers.

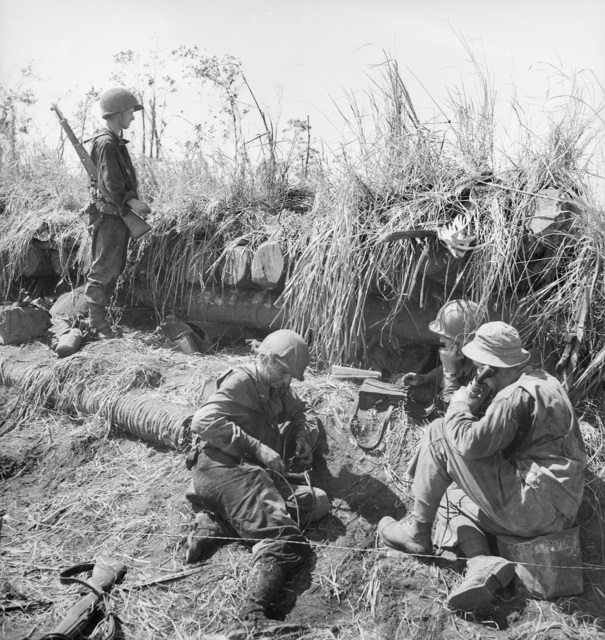
American signallers operating beside a captured Japanese bunker at Buna. AWM013979

Maximum use was made of locally available resources. Concrete and steel was also used to a limited extent. A typical structure was revetted with coconut logs, reinforced with 44-gallon (55 US gal) drums filled with earth or concrete. The roof was made from two or three courses of logs, covered with earth. Ammunition boxes filled with earth and used rice bags were also common in construction. Most of the structure was built above ground due to the shallow water table. The complete structure might be 7 to 8 feet (2 to 2.5 m) above ground level. A large proportion had been constructed well in advance of the battle and were extremely well camouflaged by jungle regrowth which quickly covered them. Entrances were designed to protect the occupants from grenade blasts.

Structures were connected by a system of crawl trenches, with firing positions in between. The bunkers were mainly intended to protect the defenders from artillery and air attack. When the threat lifted, the defenders would disperse to firing positions between the bunkers and emplacements. The War Diary of the 2/6th Independent Company recounts:

All emplacements appeared to be made of cocoanut [sic] logs laid lengthwise with others placed on bearers forming the roof. The whole was then camouflaged according to the country in which it was situated... In most cases the loopholes were hidden to view by a screen of bush or camouflage, although vision from the inside out was still possible, and in most cases the pillbox or emplacement was not discovered until you were right on to it.

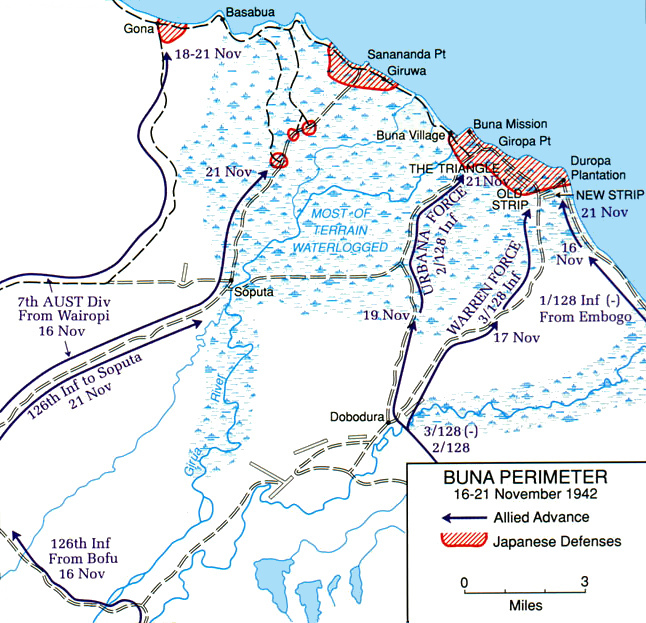
Map showing the main Japanese positions at Buna–Gona.

The main Japanese position was centred on Sanananda and Giruwa. Defensive positions were located on the coastal flanks at Gona, to the west, and Buna to the east. A further position was located forward, astride the Sanananda–Soputa track, about 3.5 miles (5.5 km) from the coast. (Note: Anderson reports that the defences "streached" seven miles inland. This appears to be inconsistent with the map provided by Anderson and those in other sources.) These were a series of posts which, apart from covering the approach to Sanananda, also denied the use of two branch tracks to Cape Killerton. The three outer defensive positions can be considered as being located at the corners of a triangle, while the main position was located at the centre of the base. These positions were each separate but, initially at least, they could be readily resupplied and reinforced from the main position. The outer positions covered the likely approaches to Sanananda–Giruwa while the swamp effectively barred any attempt to by-pass these positions.

The Japanese defenders, while not strong in artillery, nonetheless had at their disposal a variety of pieces. Indicative of this is the artillery that was deployed at Buna. McCarthy records, it consisted of: "several 75-mm naval guns, some 37-mm pom poms, 5 heavy anti-aircraft guns and a few 13-mms". (Note: Though designated as an 8 cm naval anti-aircraft gun, the actual calibre is 3 in. Japanese records list two such guns at this location.) The anti-aircraft pieces were quite capable against light armour. There was a battalion of mountain artillery located around Sanananda–Giruwa and a company at Buna.

Japanese tactics were mainly defensive in nature but included counter-attacks when positions were taken. A notable exception was the attack on 25-pounder gun emplacements of 2/1st Field Regiment near Soputa in the first minutes of 29 December. A charge was exploded in the barrel of one of the guns.

== Japanese strength ==
The positions in the Buna–Gona area were manned by both Japanese Naval and Army units. The Naval units included the 5th Special Landing Party, the equivalent of marines. Forces withdrawing down the Kokoda Track added to the strength of the original garrison. Many survivors of the Kokoda campaign congregated to the west near the mouth of the Kumusi River and linked up with Japanese reinforcements that were landed there in early December. Sources generally quote the Japanese effective strength at the start of the battle as 5,500 or 6,500 after reinforcement on the night of 18 November.

Bullard gives a total strength deployed as approximately 11,000 troops. It suggests but does not unambiguously include forces landed as reinforcements around the Kumusi and Mambrae Rivers that did not actually reach the Buna-Gona garrison. Brien gives the strength of the force as 10,000; however, this may have been derived from a planning figure and not an actual strength statement. McCarthy quotes Japanese sources giving the strength in the coastal area as 11,880. It is unclear whether this figure is the initial strength, the maximum strength or the total strength deployed but in light of Bullard's figure, it is likely the total strength deployed. Attributing this figure to the "coastal area" infers it includes forces landed as reinforcements around the Kumusi and Mambrae Rivers that did not actually join the garrison at the beachheads. Milner gives a total effective strength of 5,500 as of 16 November but notes, "No precise figure can be given for Japanese strength at the beachhead in mid-November." This is based on the interrogation of Lieutenant General Hatazō Adachi at the end of the war. Adachi commanded the 18th Army, of which the Buna-Gona garrison was part. He gave the total strength as 9,000. Milner adjusted for troops Adachi included that were not actually located at the garrison and for approximately 1,800 who were hospitalised. In the effective strength, Milner has also included Army and Navy labourers. McCarthy also reports 1,800 hospitalised at the start of the battle. The Japanese hospital facilities were located in the vicinity of Sanananda. The 67th Line of Communications Hospital was located at Giruwa and another hospital at Cape Killerton. Bullard reports that some hospital patients were deployed in defence of Gona (from a line of communications hospital). Watson and Rohfleisch report that in mid-November, "a Japanese report fixes the enemy force ashore in the Buna area at some 9,000 men". Fitzsimons also reports that there were 9,000 at the beachhead positions as the Allies approached. Sandler reports there were approximately 8,000 at Buna-Gona as the Allies were making their final advance toward the beachheads. Total strength figures will include construction units composed of 'non-combat' troops and those that were hospitalised. Bullard and Milner report that hospitalised Japanese were integrated into the garrison's defences. Condon-Rall and Cowdrey record that American troops were kept in the front lines and that, "to evacuate all those with fever at Buna would have meant immediate victory for the enemy."

=== Strength at key positions ===
The position at Buna to the Girua River was held by slightly more than 2,000 defenders, having been reinforced by the III/229th Battalion, landed on 18 November. Milner gives the strength as being, "more than 2,500 troops". Edwards records the strength as 2,500. Sandler gives the force as 3,450. Gona was held by 800–900 defenders. Milner states that the initial strength of 800 had been reinforced by a further 100. In context, this appears to be at or shortly before the Australians made contact with the force garrisoned there.

McCarthy records that the Japanese forces in front of Sanananda numbered about 5,500 including the hospitalised. No date is given but in context of text, this might be mid-December. The Center of Military History publication states, "enemy strength in the Sanananda area was therefore between four and five thousand". No date is given but the context suggests this is at or after mid-December. Bullard reports a resupply from the Mambare River to supply approximately 5,000 men. No date is given but the context suggests this is about the time that Buna fell but before 8 January. It may likely have occurred at about the same time as the reinforcement that arrived just before the new year. Milner records, "General Yamagata had some 5,000 troops at the beachhead (including the sick and wounded), but the men had almost nothing to eat and every Japanese in the area faced death by starvation." Bullard gives the strength immediately prior to the fall as 4,000. This gives a detailed breakdown of the fate of the defenders. However, Bullard gives the standing strength of the garrison at about the same time and on the same page as 5,000. McCarthy reports that the Sanananda-Giruwa garrison was strengthened by 200–300 who escaped from Buna.

Sources appear to treat the defenders on the Sananada Track as part of the defences at Sanananda–Giruwa but this does not appear to be explicitly stated. Captured documents gave the strength holding the Sanananda track position as 1,688. McCarthy records that the Sanananda Track defences were manned by approximately 1,700. Milner reports the force as 1,800.

=== Reinforcements ===
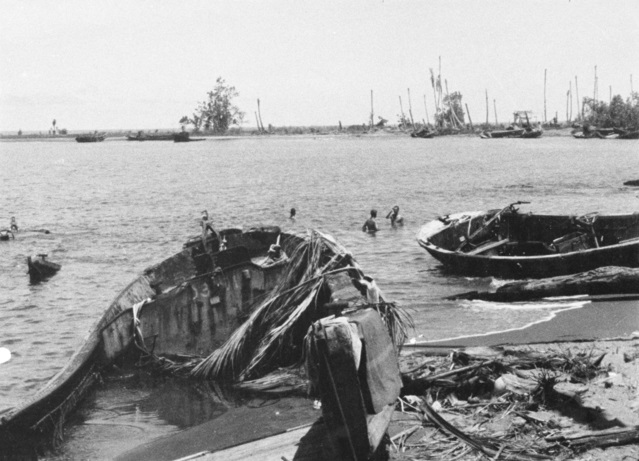
Derelict Japanese barges on the beach near Sanananda after its capture. Barges were used to resupply the coastal defences. Allied soldiers are enjoying a swim in background. AWM030258

McAuley indicates at least 1,200 troops landed from Rabaul on the night of 18 November. McAuley also records a Japanese source as stating that 1,500 were landed to reinforce the Gona area at about this time. Bullard records that approximately 1,500 men were landed at the "Buna anchorage" over the nights of 17 and 18 November. Milner gives this as 1,000, landing on the night of 17 November. This reinforcement increased the effective strength to 6,500. Bullard records the landing at Basabua (just east of Gona) of 800 reinforcements for the South Seas Force on the evening of 21 November. McAuley makes reference to this landing but does not appear to indicate the strength of the force landed.

Withdrawing Japanese, isolated by the Australian advance had congregated near the mouth of the Kumusi River. Milner reports the strength gathered there as 900, under command of Colonel Yazawa. Milner records that, from this, a reinforcement of 500 reach Giruwa on 29 November McCarthy reports that 400 – 500 reinforcements from this force reached Sanananda. Milner reports that, on 2 December, barges unsuccessfully attempted to land 200 troops from the Kumusi River to reinforce Gona. The barges returned to Giruwa after the failed attempt.

Four further attempts by destroyer convoys were made to reinforce the beachheads with the 21st Independent Mixed Brigade from Rabaul. The Brigade was commanded by Major General Yamagata. Convoys on 28 November and 9 December were turned back by air attacks. A convoy on 2 December, after an aborted attempt at Basabua, landed about 500 troops, mainly the III/170th Battalion, near the mouth of the Kumusi River. (Note: Bullard reports, "The brigade commander had barely one infantry battalion and elements of the brigade signals unit with him", but does not give a specific strength.) These troops joined with troops of the 41st Infantry Regt that Colonel Yazawa had been forced to leave behind. This force actively threatened the western flank of the Australians at Gona. On 12 December, 800 troops, mainly of the I/170th Battalion were landed near the mouth of the Mambare River, further along the coast. (Note: Bullard reports the strength landed as 591.) Part of this force was moved to reinforce the III/170th Bn operating against the flank at Gona. Between 700 – 800 reached Giruwa between 27 and 31 December. McCarthy records that a reinforcement arrived from 26 December.

The Center of Military History reports, "A detachment of the Yamagata Brigade, numbering less than 1,000 ... arrived during the first 2 weeks of December." (Note: The reinforcement in late December reported Milner and McCarthy was from Yamagata's Brigade. The date of this reinforcement reported in the Center of Military History publication appears to be in conflict with these sources.) It is also reported that 500 fresh troops were landed at Giruwa on about 12 January. This does not appear to have been recorded in any of the other primary sources (Note: It may be a confusion with landings on about 2 January by Colonel Yazawa, intended to rescue troops at Buna but this plan was overtaken by the fall of Buna. Yazawa's force was to consist of 430 troops (but actually only 250) that had been landed only days earlier but it was an internal deployment.) The date appears quite inconsistent as plans were already being made for evacuation of the garrison by this time. Anderson reports: "the enemy managed to put ashore during December about 1,300 fresh troops with supplies at several points west of Gona. These troops then made their way at night to Sanananda and Buna Mission." The Japanese relied heavily on motor barges for these movements.

=== Reconciling reported strengths ===
Milner's starting figure of 9,000 includes 900 that had withdrawn down the Kumusi River and were under command of Colonel Yazawa west of Gona and 900 troops landed from Rabaul on 17 November. (Note: Milner reports the actual number landed as 1,000.) Other sources report 1,500 were landed over the night of 17–18 November. This is 600 less than reported elsewhere. Milner does not appear to mention the arrival of the South Seas Force reinforcement (800) on 21 November. The 21st Independent Mixed Brigade landed 1,300 troops near the Kumusi and Mambare Rivers. This gives a figure for additional forces of 2,700. Added to the initial 9,000 reported by Milner this gives a total deployed to the beachheads and west of Gona of 11,700. This is consistent with total deployed strengths of 11,000 to nearly 12,000. Of this figure, approximately 1,000 remained to the west of Gona and did not reach the beachheads. (Note: 700–800 of the 1,300 personnel from the 21st Independent Mixed Brigade reinforced the beachheads and 400–500 of the force under command of Colonel Yazawa.)

Figures for total strengths should also be considered in light of the strengths reported at each position. Note is given to the variation in strengths reported at each position. (Note: See the 'Strength at key positions' section.) Based on the following strengths reported of 900 at Gona, 2,500 at Buna and 5,500 at Sanananda, the apparent total strength would be 8,900. All of these figures are inclusive of reinforcements received on 17–18 November. The strength at Sanananda appears, from context, to be in mid-December. The strength at the beachheads at this time would not include any of the 1,300 from the 21st Independent Mixed Brigade that did not reinforce the positions until the end of December. About 500 of the force gathered by Colonel Yazawa remained west of Gona. Deducting these from the total strength deployed (11,700) gives a strength deployed to the beachheads by in mid-December of 9,900. The South Seas Force reinforcement landed on 21 November totaled 800.

While figures reported by the authors cited may appear inconsistent, it may be possible to ascribe some of this to a lack of precision or ambiguity as to what the reported figures represent in respect to time and what or where the figures reported do or do not include. Some variation may be the result of how the various authors have handle ranges or estimates in determining a figure that they report. (Note: As an example, Milner gives the effective strength after reinforcements about 18 November as 6,500, an increase of 1,000. Other sources report the reinforcement at about this time as up to 1,500. This would lead to an effective strength of 7,000. The apparent discrepancy is readily reconciled on the basis of the rationale by which the two figures have been derived. The difficulty is that the premises leading to such discrepancies are rarely stated by most authors cited and must be deduced or inferred.)

== Casualties and losses ==
=== Prisoners ===
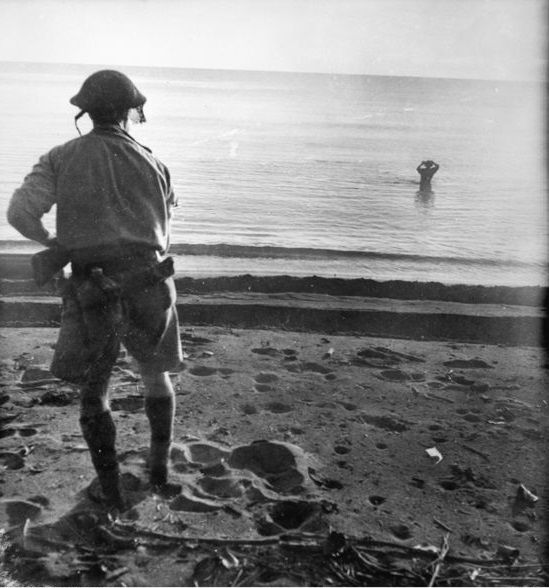
A Japanese soldier attempting to escape by sea avoids capture by exploding a grenade by his head. AWM013968

Few prisoners were taken on any front. Fifty prisoners were taken at Buna. More than 200 prisoners were taken at Sanananda–Giruwa. No figure could be identified for the number of prisoners take at Gona. Milner reports that 350 prisoners were taken during the fighting in Papua, indicating this includes fighting along the Kokoda Track, at Milne Bay and Goodenough Island.

=== Evacuation ===
About 1,200 sick and wounded were evacuated by sea just prior to the fall of Sanananda. Milner reports about 2,000, including sick and wounded were evacuated by sea in the closing stages or escaped overland. McCarthy reports about 1,000 escaped overland to the west of Gona but Japanese sources suggest this may be as high as 1,900. Many Japanese attempted to escape by sea as each location fell.

=== Number of Japanese killed ===
In accounting for the Japanese killed during the battle, a number of matters need to be noted. It is apparent that as the battle progressed, the Japanese were less inclined or less able to manage burial of their dead. At Gona, McCarthy reports that the Japanese had made no attempt to bury the dead, some of whom had been "laying out for days". Milner reports that the "stench" was so bad that toward the end, "the living had been driven to put on gas masks". In accounting for Japanese dead, the principle references make no apparent mention of consulting Japanese records or otherwise accounting for Japanese burials. McCarthy indicates that many dead may have been buried in collapsed bunkers and remained unaccounted for. Bombardment possibly obliterated traces of many others. Milner notes that there was a tendency of American units to 'double count' Japanese dead and, where there was a joint responsibility between Australian and American units for recording Japanese dead, Australian figures should be preferred.

At Gona, McCarthy records that 638 Japanese were buried; Milner records two conflicting totals: only 362 burials at one entry but 638 at another. Milner records that 1,400 Japanese were buried at Buna and that 2,537 were killed in the Australian area of operation, which includes Sanananda-Giruwa, Gona and the area around the Amboga River. Elsewhere, Milner refers to 1,993 having been buried but the context is ambiguous as to where or who was responsible for these. Brigadier General Charles A. Willoughby was of the opinion that: "the count of enemy dead at Sanananda could not be considered 'a true count of effective enemy strength' since it included many 'sick and wounded who were killed.'" Milner also records that in the hospital area at Giruwa, only those "too helpless to resist, were taken prisoner." McCarthy recounts Australians at Gona encountering a Japanese post where "at least nine" of the twelve manning it were "streacher cases, but all opened fire on [the] party [of Australians] with grenades and rifles."

McCarthy reports a Japanese source as giving the number of dead as 8,000. Bullard reports the number of dead as 7,000. McCarthy attempts to reconcile the Japanese strength against the numbers buried, evacuated, escaped or taken prisoner. He identifies a discrepancy of 3,200 unaccounted for. Of these, he says, "a considerable number must have been dead on sea and land and uncounted". Milner concludes that "apparently" the Japanese buried the remainder.

== Japanese order of battle ==
Bullard reports the disposition of Japanese forces at the beachheads as of 26 November 1942 as follows. (Note: McAuley gives the disposition of Japanese forces at about the same time with some additional units. Additional information has been included.)

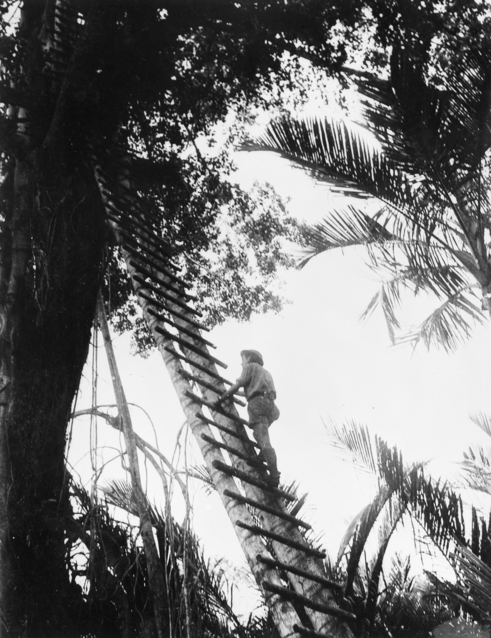
A Japanese tree-top observation post constructed on the edge of the Old Strip at Buna. It was used to direct fire from two 3-inch naval guns against Allied troops. AWM 014023

Buna

Commanded by Captain Yoshitatsu Yasuda (IJN)

229th Infantry Regiment, 3rd Battalion
38th Mountain Artillery Regiment, 2nd Company
47th Field Anti-aircraft Artillery Battalion (one company)
14th Pioneer Unit
15th Pioneer Unit
5th Yokosuka Special Landing Party (SLP)

Sanananda-Soputa

Commanded by Colonel Yosuke Yokoyama

Detachment 5th Sasebo SLP (Note: McAuley does not give details of where in this area it is deployed.)

South-east sector (south of Giruwa)

Commander: Lieutenant Colonel Tsukamoto Hatsuo (144th Infantry Regiment, 1st Battalion commander)

144th Infantry Regiment (with elements II/144 and III/144 and Regt HQ)
Detachment 41st Infantry Regiment (approximately 300 troops led by Lieutenant Takenaka)
Field Hospital patients (Takeda Unit)
Takasago Volunteer Unit (small number)

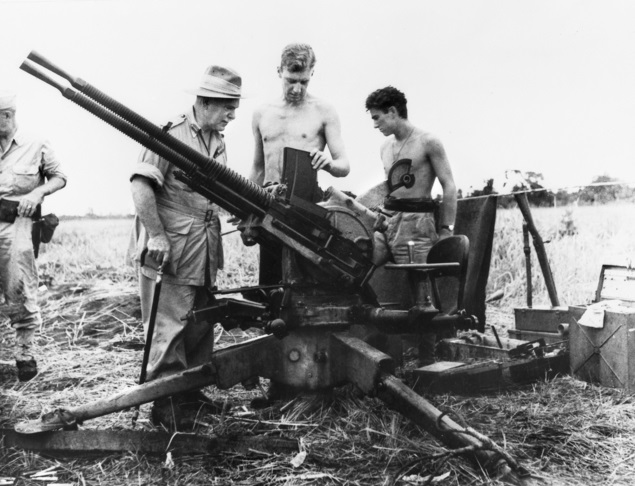
A captured Japanese double mount Type 96 25 mm AT/AA gun at Buna. AWM 014104

Central sector

South Seas Force Headquarters (commander and staff officers missing)
55th Mountain Artillery Regiment, 1st Battalion
15th Independent Engineer Regiment main strength (approximately 300 troops)
47th Field Anti-aircraft Artillery Battalion main strength
South Seas Force Medical Unit (total with two hospitals approximately 2,500 men, mainly patients)

South Seas Force field hospital
Line-of-communication hospital

Murase Battalion (South Seas Force reinforcements, approximately 800 troops)

Rear sector (area north of Giruwa to the north of central sector units)

Line-of-communication units
South Seas Force cavalry units
41st Infantry Regiment (less 1st Battalion)

Gona

Commanded by Lieutenant Colonel Yoshinobu Tomita

Gona area

41st Infantry Regiment, 1st Battalion

Basabua sector

Uchida Unit (formed from patients of the Line of communication hospital)
Nakamura Unit (formed from the Takasago Volunteers)
Mori Unit (formed from the Disease Prevention and Water Supply Unit)
Sōda Unit (Detachment 41st Infantry Regiment – 69 men)

== Command ==
Major General Tomitarō Horii, who had led the attack across the Kokoda Track, drowned at sea on 19 November after rafting down the Kumusi River during the withdrawal from Kokoda. (Note: Horii was posthumously promoted from major general to lieutenant general.) Colonel Yosuke Yokoyama temporarily assumed command of the South Seas Force following Horii's death. Major General Kensaku Oda succeeded Horii to command of the South Seas Force. Major General Tsuyuo Yamagata commanded the 21st Independent Mixed Brigade and was given command of all 18th Army units in the area other than the South Seas Force. He landed near the Kumusi River on 2 December and reached Gona on 6 December. On this date, he was given overall command of the Japanese units engaged in the battle.

== See also ==
- Battle of Buna–Gona: Allied forces and order of battle

== Bibliography ==
- Anderson, Charles (1992). Papua. The U.S. Army Campaigns of World War II. Vol. 11. Washington, D.C.: United States Army Center of Military History. ISBN 978-0-16-035883-8.
- Brien, James (2013). "The bloody beachheads: Buna, Gona and Sanananda, 1942–43" (PDF). Australian War Memorial. Archived from the original (PDF) on 2015-06-09.
- Japanese army operations in the South Pacific Area New Britain and Papua campaigns, 1942–43. Translated by Bullard, Steven. Canberra: Australian War Memorial. 2007. ISBN 978-0-9751904-8-7. Archived from the original on 2009-04-09.
- Center of Military History (1990). Papuan Campaign: Buna-Sanananda Operation 16 November 1942 – 23 January 1943 (PDF). Washington, D.C.: United States Army Center of Military History. LCCN 91601186. OCLC 21992748. Archived from the original (PDF) on 13 December 2014.
- Condon-Rall, Mary Ellen; Cowdrey, Albert E. (1998). The Technical Services—The Medical Department: Medical Service In The War Against Japan (PDF). United States Army In World War II. Washington, DC: Center Of Military History, United States Army. LCCN 97022644. Archived from the original (PDF) on 2015-09-24.
- Edwards, Paul M. (2010). Between the Lines of World War II: Twenty-one Remarkable People and Events. Jefferson, N.C.: McFarland & Co. ISBN 978-0786446674. LCCN 2010025083.
- Eichelberger, Robert L. (1950). Our Jungle Road to Tokyo. New York: Viking Press. LCCN 50009852. OCLC 1262852.
- Fitzsimons, Peter (2004). Kokoda. Sydney: Hachette. ISBN 9780733619625. LCCN 2005440684.
- Gillison, Douglas (1962). Royal Australian Air Force 1939–1942. Australia in the War of 1939–1945. Series 3 – Air. Volume 1. Canberra: Australian War Memorial. OCLC 2000369.
- Hayashi, Saburo (1959). Kōgun: the Japanese Army in the Pacific War. Quantico: Marine Corps Association. OCLC 1133179.
- Huber, Thomas M. (1995). "Eichelberger at Buna: A Study in Battle Command". Studies in Battle Command (PDF). Fort Leavenworth, Kansas: Faculty Combat Studies Institute, U.S. Command and General Staff College. pp. 123–127. OCLC 58724472. Archived from the original (PDF) on 2016-03-04.
- James, Karl (2009). ""The Track": A Historical Desktop Study of the Kokoda Track" (PDF). Commonwealth Department of the Environment.
- Keogh, E.G (1965). South West Pacific 1941–45. Melbourne: Grayflower Publications. OCLC 7185705.
- MacArthur, Douglas; Staff of his General Headquarters (1994). The Campaigns of MacArthur in the Pacific (Volume 1). Reports of General MacArthur. Washington DC: United States Army Center of Military History. LCCN 66-60005.
- McAuley, Lex (1992). To the Bitter End. Sydney: Random House. ISBN 0091825571.
- McCarthy, Dudley (1959). South – West Pacific Area – First Year: Kokoda to Wau. Australia in the War of 1939–1945, Series 1—Army. Volume V (1st ed.). Canberra: Australian War Memorial. OCLC 3134247.
- Milner, Samuel (1957). Victory in Papua. United States Army In World War II. Washington, DC: Center Of Military History, United States Army. LCCN 56-60004.
- Sandler, Stanley, ed. (2001). World War II in the Pacific: An Encyclopedia. Taylor & Francis. ISBN 9780815318835.
- United States Army (1943). History of the Buna Campaign December 1, 1942 – January 25, 1943: Part 2 (June 17, 1943).
- Watson, Richard L. (1944). Air Action in the Papuan Campaign: 21 July 1942 to 23 January 1943 (PDF). Washington, D. C.: Assistant Chief of Air Staff, Intelligence; Historical Division. OCLC 22357584.
- Watson, Richard L.; Rohfleisch, Kramer J. (1950). "The Crisis in the South and Southwest Pacific". In Craven, Wesley Frank; Cate, James Lea (eds.). Vol. IV, The Pacific: Guadalcanal to Saipan, August 1942 to July 1944. The Army Air Forces in World War II. Chicago: University of Chicago Press. OCLC 5732980.
- Winters, Harold A.; Gerald E. Galloway, Jr.; William J. Reynolds; David W. Rhyne (2001). Battling the Elements: Weather and Terrain in the Conduct of War (illustrated ed.). JHU Press. ISBN 978-0-8018-6648-7.
