= 0-4-2 =

Locomotive wheel arrangement

0-4-2 (Olomana)
- Front of locomotive at left

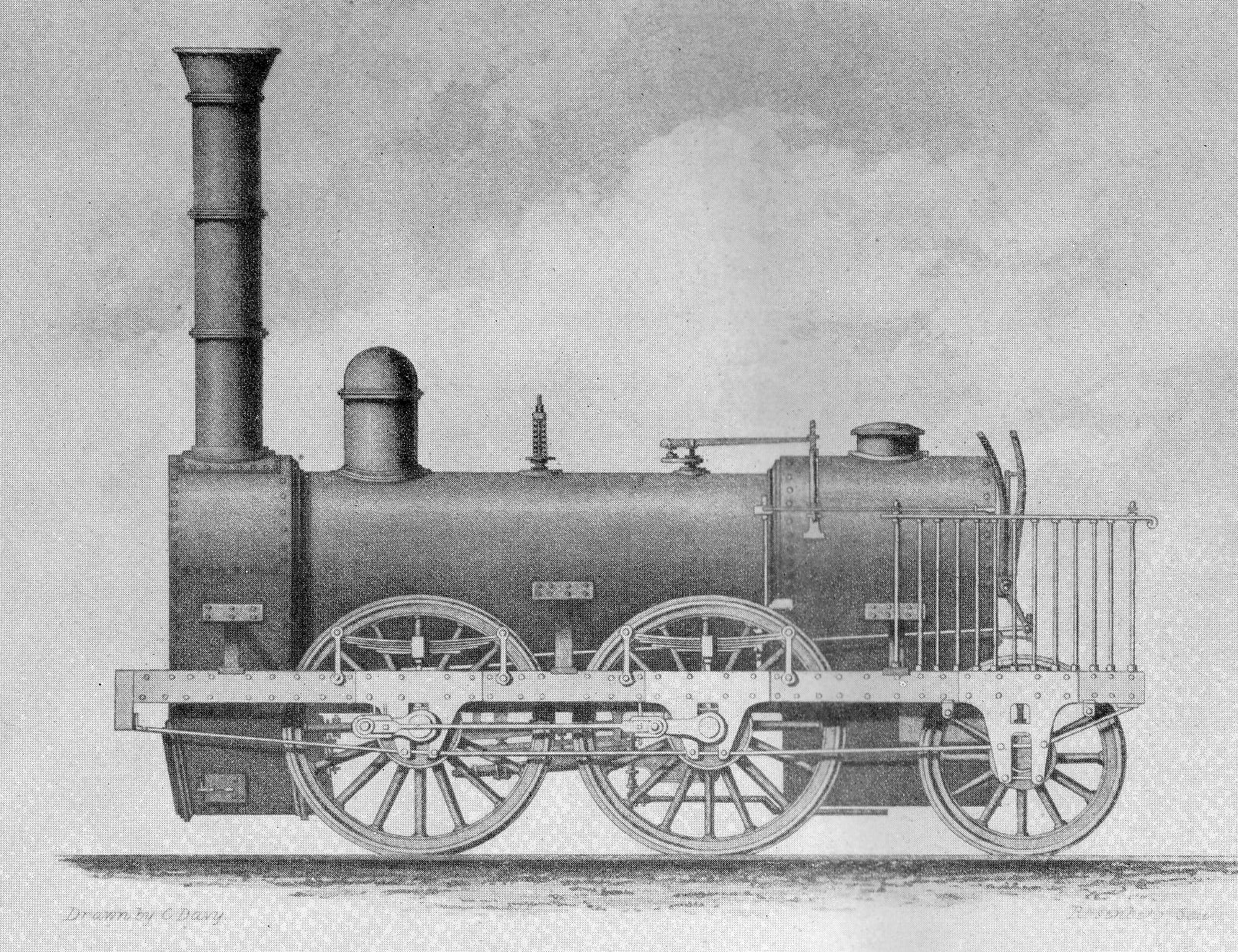
- The Stephenson 0-4-2, 1834
Equivalent classifications
- UIC class: B1, B1’
- French class: 021
- Turkish class: 23
- Swiss class: 2/3
- Russian class: 0-2-1
First known tank engine version
- First use: c. 1860s
- Country: United Kingdom
First known tender engine version
- First use: 1834
- Country: United Kingdom
- Railway: Stanhope and Tyne Railway
- Designer: Robert Stephenson
- Builder: Robert Stephenson and Company
- Benefits: Better adhesion than the 2-2-2

Under the Whyte notation for the classification of steam locomotives, 0-4-2 represents the wheel arrangement with no leading wheels, four powered and coupled driving wheels on two axles and two trailing wheels on one axle. While the first locomotives of this wheel arrangement were tender engines, the configuration was later often used for tank engines, which is noted by adding letter suffixes to the configuration, such as 0-4-2T for a conventional side-tank locomotive, 0-4-2ST for a saddle-tank locomotive, 0-4-2WT for a well-tank locomotive and 0-4-2RT for a rack-equipped tank locomotive.

== Overview ==
The earliest recorded 0-4-2 locomotives were three goods engines built by Robert Stephenson and Company for the Stanhope and Tyne Railway in 1834.

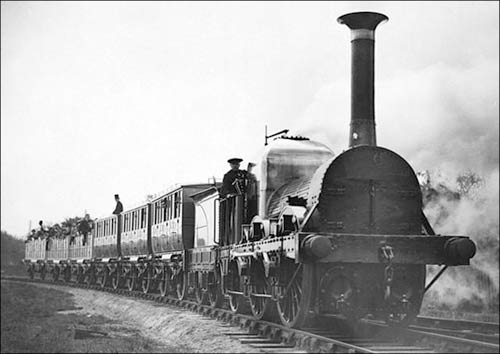
LMR 57 Lion

The first locomotive built in Germany in 1838, the Saxonia, was also an 0-4-2. In the same year Todd, Kitson & Laird built two examples for the Liverpool and Manchester Railway, one of which, LMR 57 Lion, has been preserved. The Lion had a top speed of 45 miles per hour (72 kilometres per hour) and could pull up to 200 long tons (203 metric tons; 224 short tons).

Over the next quarter of a century, the type was adopted by many early British railways for freight haulage since it afforded greater adhesion than the contemporary 2-2-2 passenger configuration, although in time they were also used for mixed-traffic duties.

== Usage ==
=== Austria ===
The Emperor Ferdinand Northern Railway (Kaiser Ferdinands-Nordbahn) acquired the locomotives Minotaurus and Ajax from the British manufacturer Jones, Turner and Evans in 1841, to work the line between Vienna and Stockerau. The locomotive Ajax has been preserved at the Vienna Technical Museum since 1992 and is described as the oldest preserved steam locomotive on the European continent.

=== Finland ===
In Finland, the 0-4-2 wheel arrangement was represented by the Classes B1 and B2.

The Finnish Steam Locomotive Class B1 is an 0-4-2ST locomotive, built from 1868 to 1890 by Beyer, Peacock and Company at Gorton Foundry in Manchester, England.

=== Hawaii ===
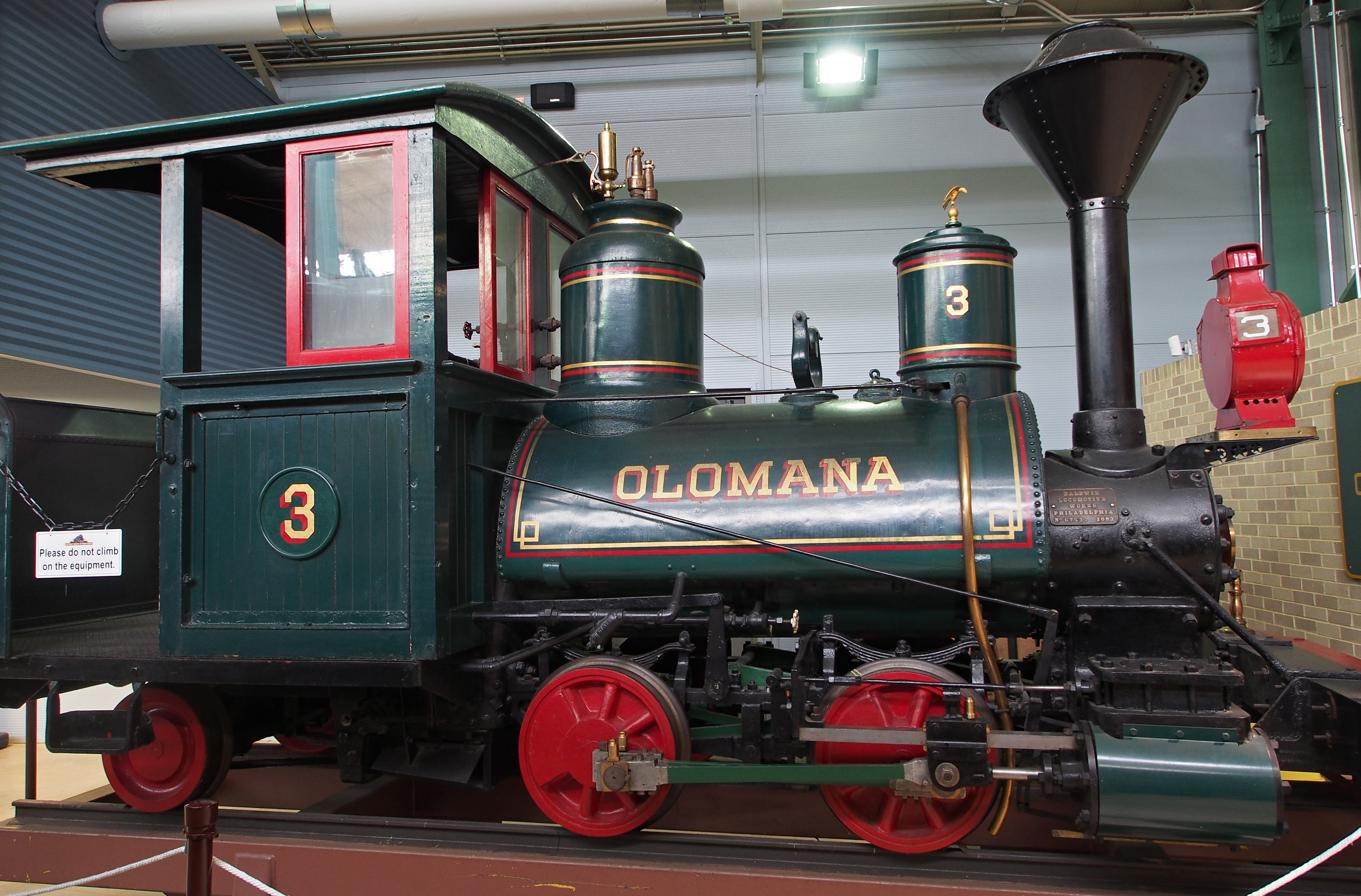
The Olomana

Although the type was not used by any major railroads in North America, HK Porter and the Baldwin Locomotive Works produced many small tank locomotives of this type for industrial and plantation work. The 0-4-2ST Olomana, built by Baldwin in 1883, arrived in the Kingdom of Hawaii in August 1883 after a two-month journey around Cape Horn. It was owned by Waimanalo Sugar Company on the island of Oahu and hauled cane from the fields to its refinery.

=== Indonesia ===
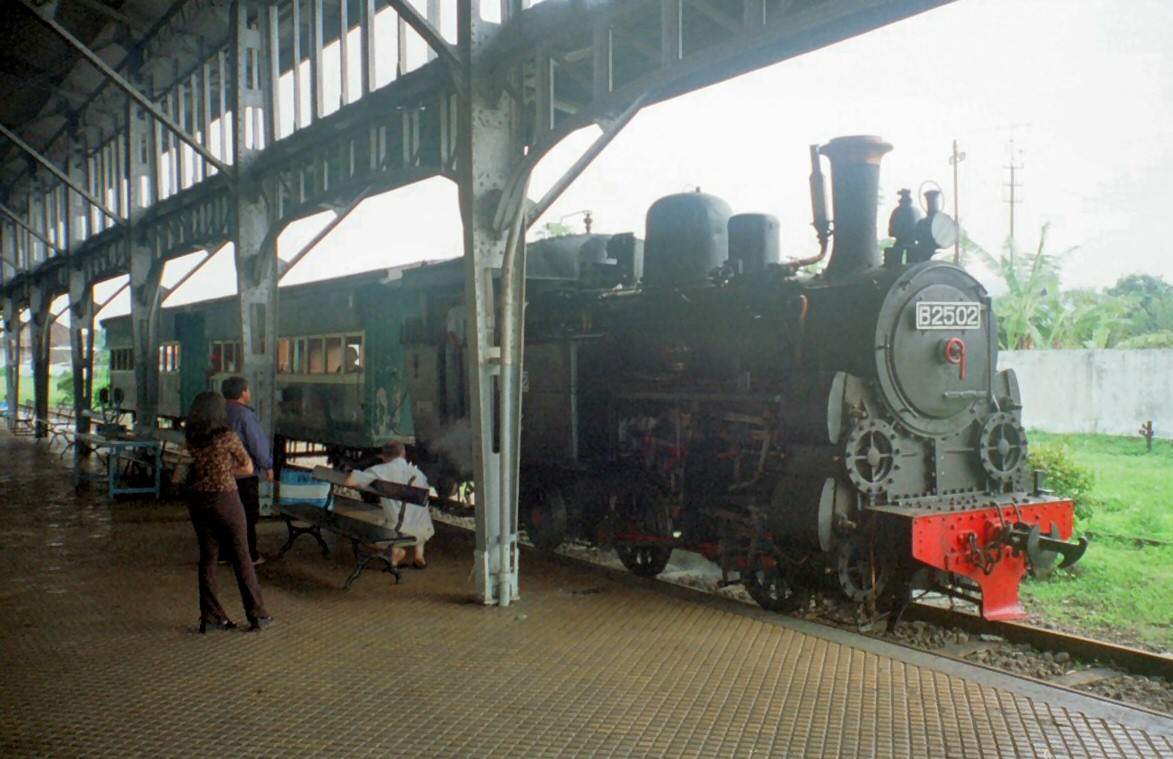
B25-02 Steam Locomotive at Ambarawa Railway Museum

In 1905, the Nederlandsch Indische Spoorweg Maatschappij (NIS) opened a line between Yogyakarta and Ambarawa via Magelang to facilitate the mobilization of Royal Dutch East Indies Army (KNIL) forces from Fort Willem I, line between Secang–Kedungjati passed a hilly region which requiring rack railway because of the 6.5% gradients. So, the NIS ordered 5 units of 0-4-2RTs wood burning NIS Class 230s that were came in 1902 and 1906 from Maschinenfabrik Esslingen, Germany. They were four-cylinder compound locomotives with two of the cylinders working the pinion wheels.

During Japanese occupation of the Dutch East Indies in 1942, all of Dutch East Indies railways locomotives had been renumbered, for all NIS Class 230s were changed to B25, from five of them only three left. There are two examples of B25 class locomotive still in operation, namely B25-02 and B25-03. Both were based in Ambarawa, where they have served for more than a hundred years. Locomotive B25-01 may also still be found as static display at the entrance to the Ambarawa Railway Museum.

On the island of Sumatra, there are some larger cousins of this class being used for hauling coal trains, namely the D18 and E10 classes.

=== New Zealand ===
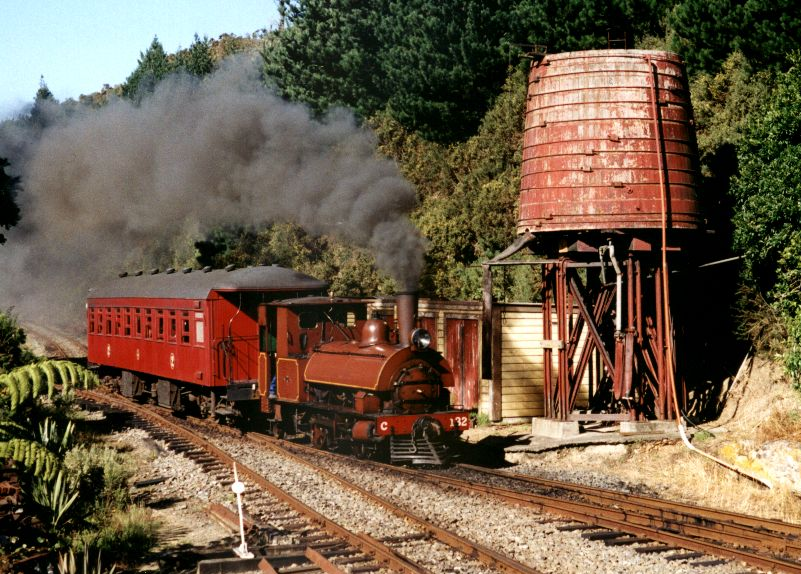
NZR C class of 1873

The 0-4-2T arrangement was used by two classes of locomotives operated by the New Zealand Railways Department. The first was the C class of 1873, originally built as an 0-4-0T. The class was found to be unstable at speeds higher than 15 mph (24 km/h), so by 1880 all members of the class had been converted to 0-4-2T to rectify this problem.

The second and more notable 0-4-2T class, and the only one actually built as 0-4-2T, was the unique H class designed to operate the Rimutaka Incline on the Wairarapa Line. The incline's steep gradient necessitated the use of the Fell mountain railway system, and the six members of the H class spent their entire lives operating trains on the Incline. Except for a few brief experiments with other classes, the H class had exclusive use of the Incline from their introduction in 1875 until the Incline's closure in 1955. Class leader, H 199, is preserved on static display at the Fell Engine Museum in Featherston and is the only extant Fell locomotive in the world.

The 0-4-2T arrangement was also employed for steam locomotives operated by small private industrial railways and bush and mineral tramways. One such locomotive, built by Peckett and Sons in 1957, is currently operational on the Heritage Park Railway, Whangarei. It is one of four such locomotives imported from Peckett, and was the last steam locomotive imported into New Zealand before dieselization.

Two others worked alongside her and are preserved, whilst the fourth was owned by a forestry railway, who converted it to a diesel locomotive.

=== South Africa ===
==== Standard gauge ====
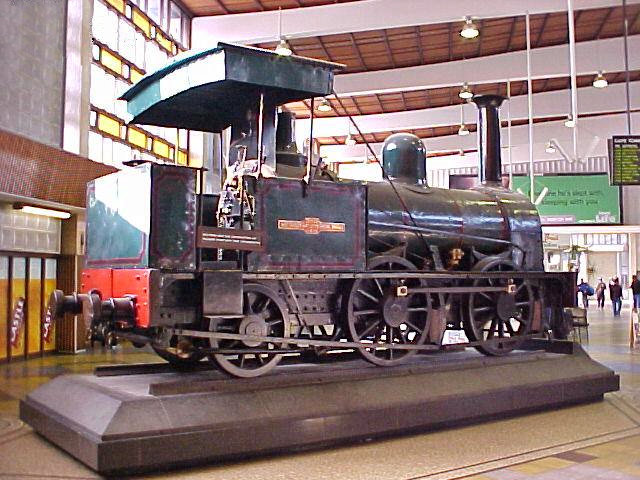
Blackie plinthed at Cape Town railway station

In September 1859, Messrs. E. & J. Pickering, contractors to the Cape Town Railway & Dock Company for the construction of the Cape Town-Wellington Railway, imported a small 0-4-0S steam locomotive from England for use during the construction of the railway. This was the first locomotive in South Africa. In c. 1874, the locomotive was rebuilt to a 0-4-2T configuration before it was shipped to Port Alfred, where it served as construction locomotive on the banks of the Kowie river and was nicknamed Blackie. It has been declared a heritage object and was plinthed in the main concourse of Cape Town station.

In 1860, the Cape Town Railway & Dock Company took delivery of eight standard gauge tender locomotives with an 0-4-2 wheel arrangement for service on the Cape Town-Wellington Railway, which was still under construction. They remained in service on this line while it was being converted to dual standard-and-Cape gauges from around 1872 and were only retired in 1881, when sufficient Cape gauge locomotives were in service.

==== Cape gauge ====
Two 3 ft 6 in (1,067 mm) Cape gauge tank engine classes of this wheel arrangement were supplied to the Nederlandsche-Zuid-Afrikaansche Spoorweg-Maatschappij (NZASM) by Maschinenfabriek Esslingen and Breda, Nederland between 1890 and 1894.

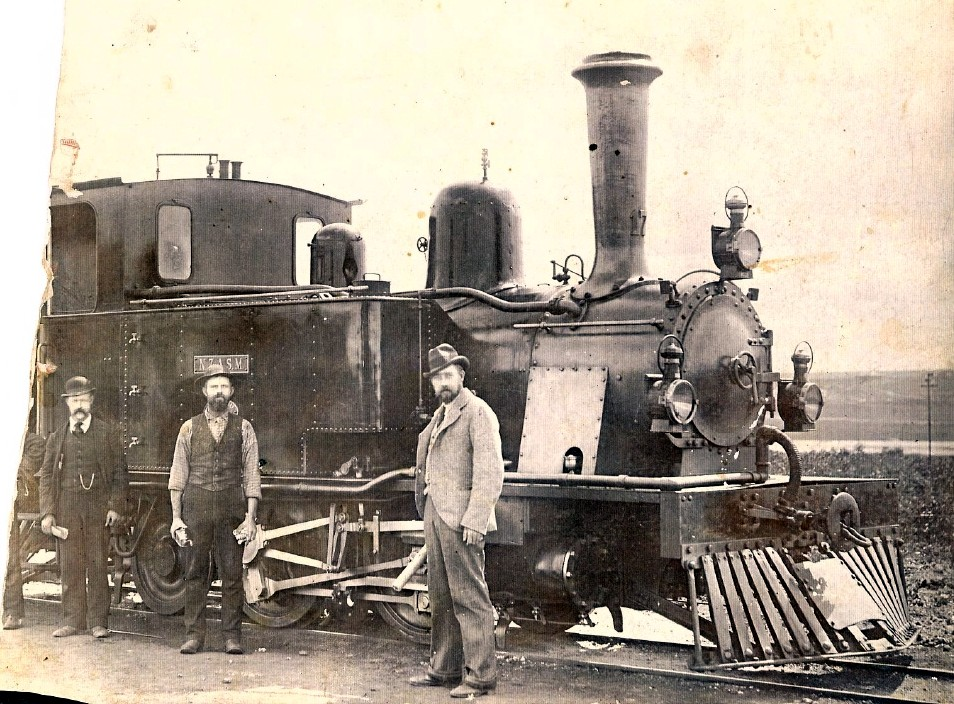
NZASM 19 Tonner no. 17

- The earlier class of twenty-four 19 Tonner locomotives, built by Maschinenfabriek Esslingen and Machinefabriek Breda v/h Backer & Rueb, were delivered between 1890 and 1892. Between 1906 and 1909, while in Central South African Railways (CSAR) service, ten of them were converted to rail motor engines for use on suburban services. In 1912, these locomotives were taken onto the South African Railways (SAR) roster as obsolete unclassified locomotives.
- The later class of four 32 Tonner rack locomotives, built by Esslingen in 1894 and 1897, was equipped with pinions for use on the rack railway section between Waterval Onder and Waterval Boven in the eastern Transvaal. They survived through the Imperial Military Railways (IMR) and CSAR eras and, even though the rack section was removed in 1908, they were still in service in 1912 when they were taken onto the SAR roster as obsolete unclassified locomotives.

==== Narrow gauges ====
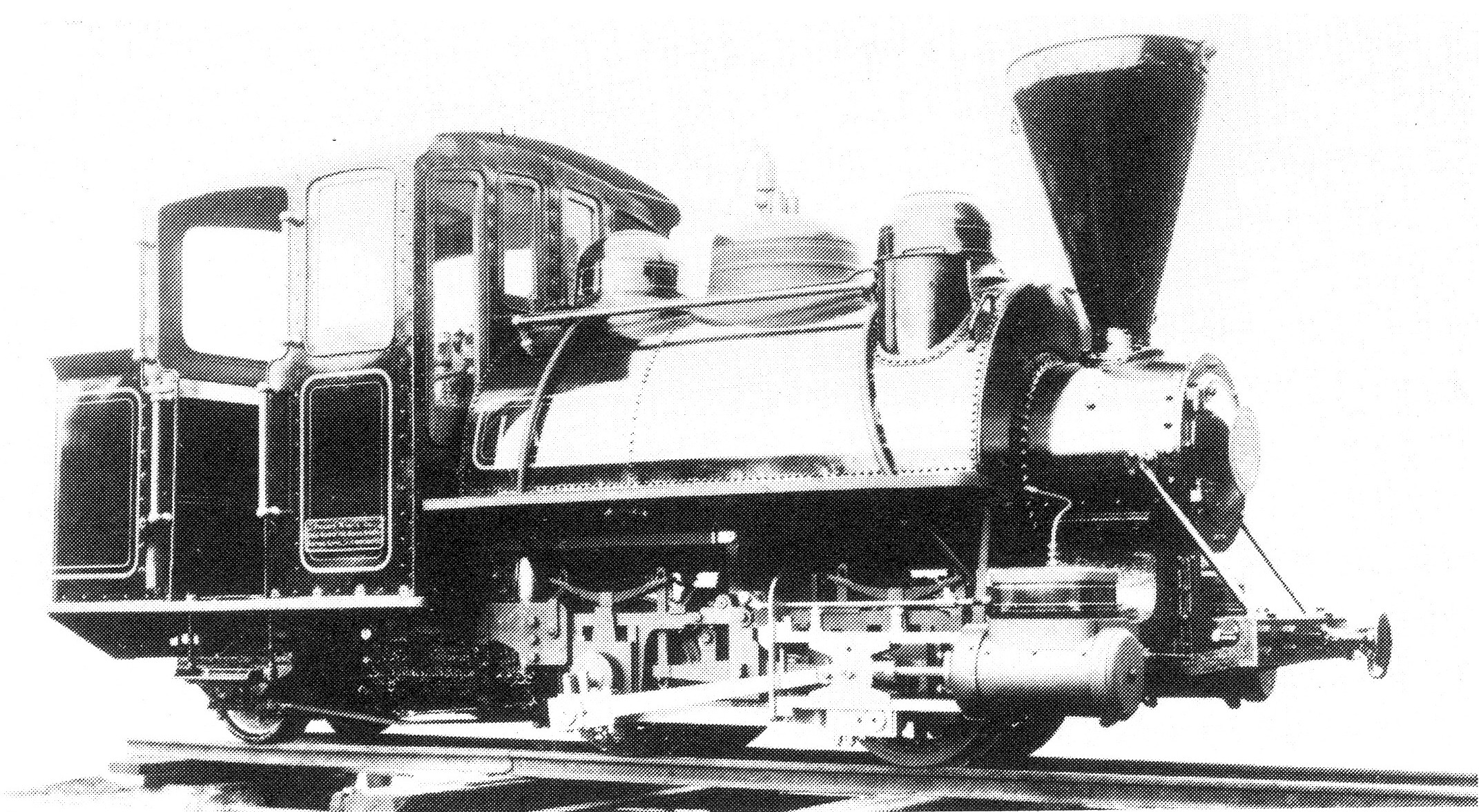
SAR Class NG2

Between 1897 and 1901, several 0-4-2 saddle tank steam locomotives, built for 600 mm (1 ft 11 5/8 in) narrow gauge by Dickson Manufacturing Company of Scranton in Pennsylvania, were delivered to various gold mines on the Witwatersrand by Arthur Koppel, acting as importing agents. In 1915, when an urgent need arose for additional locomotives in Deutsch-Südwest-Afrika during World War I, two of these 0-4-2ST locomotives were purchased second-hand by the SAR for use on the narrow gauge lines in that territory. The two locomotives remained in South West Africa after the war and were later designated Class NG2 on the SAR.

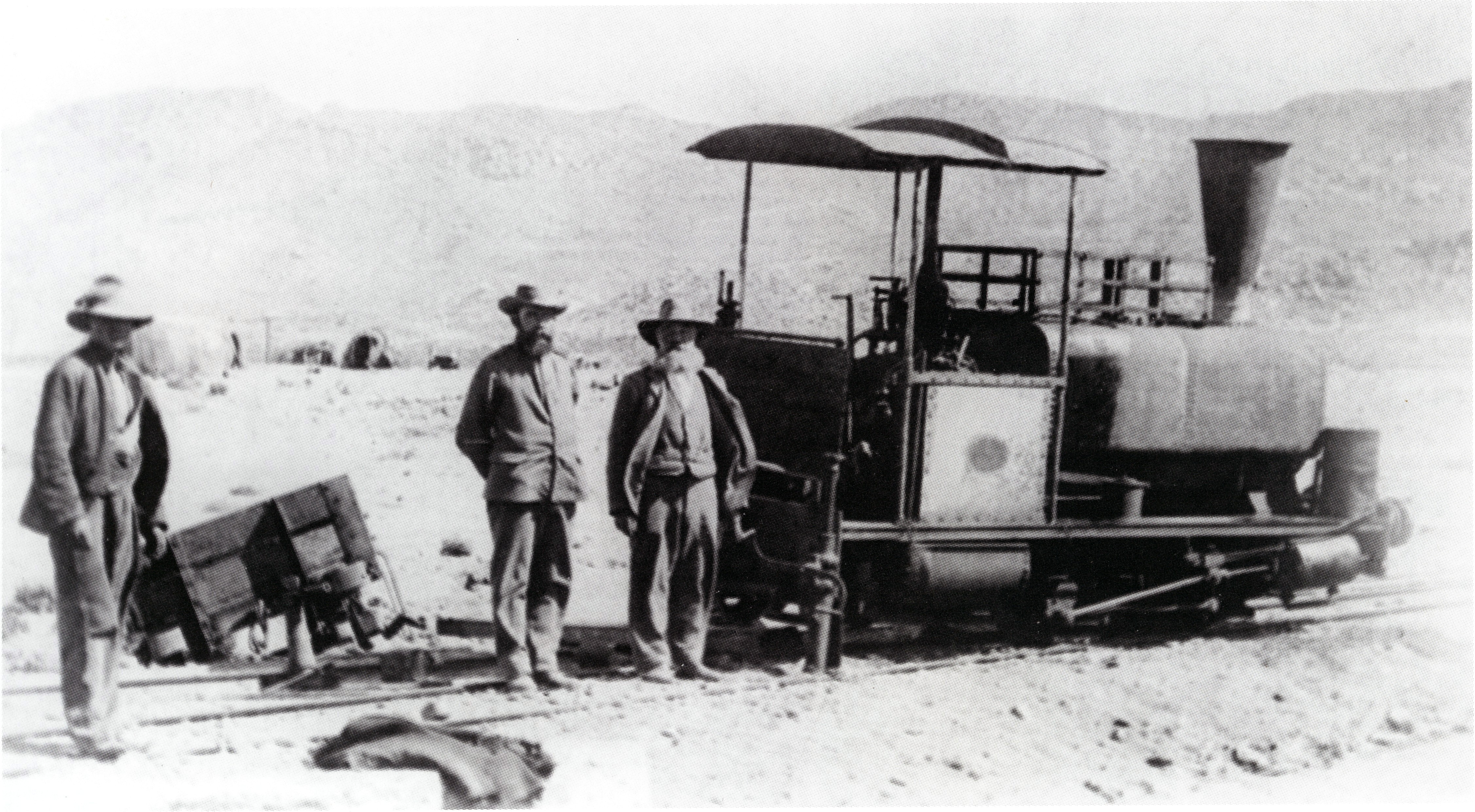
Pioneer derailed outside O'okiep after a Boer commando attack

The Namaqua Copper Company's first 2 ft 6 in (762 mm) gauge locomotive, acquired in 1901, was a Dick, Kerr & Co. built 0-4-2ST named Pioneer which was rebuilt from the 0-4-0ST configuration, possibly due to the additional weight of fuel tanks which were installed under the cab when it was converted to use fuel oil. The company also operated four more 0-4-2T locomotives, one 9 Ton and three 12 Ton, possibly also acquired from Dick, Kerr & Company.

In 1904, a single 2 ft 6 in (762 mm) gauge 0-4-2IST locomotive named Caledonia was placed in service by the Cape Copper Company as a shunting engine at O'okiep in the Cape Colony.

In 1905, the Cape Copper Company also placed a single 0-4-2T locomotive named Britannia in service as a shunting engine at Port Nolloth in the Cape Colony.

=== United Kingdom ===
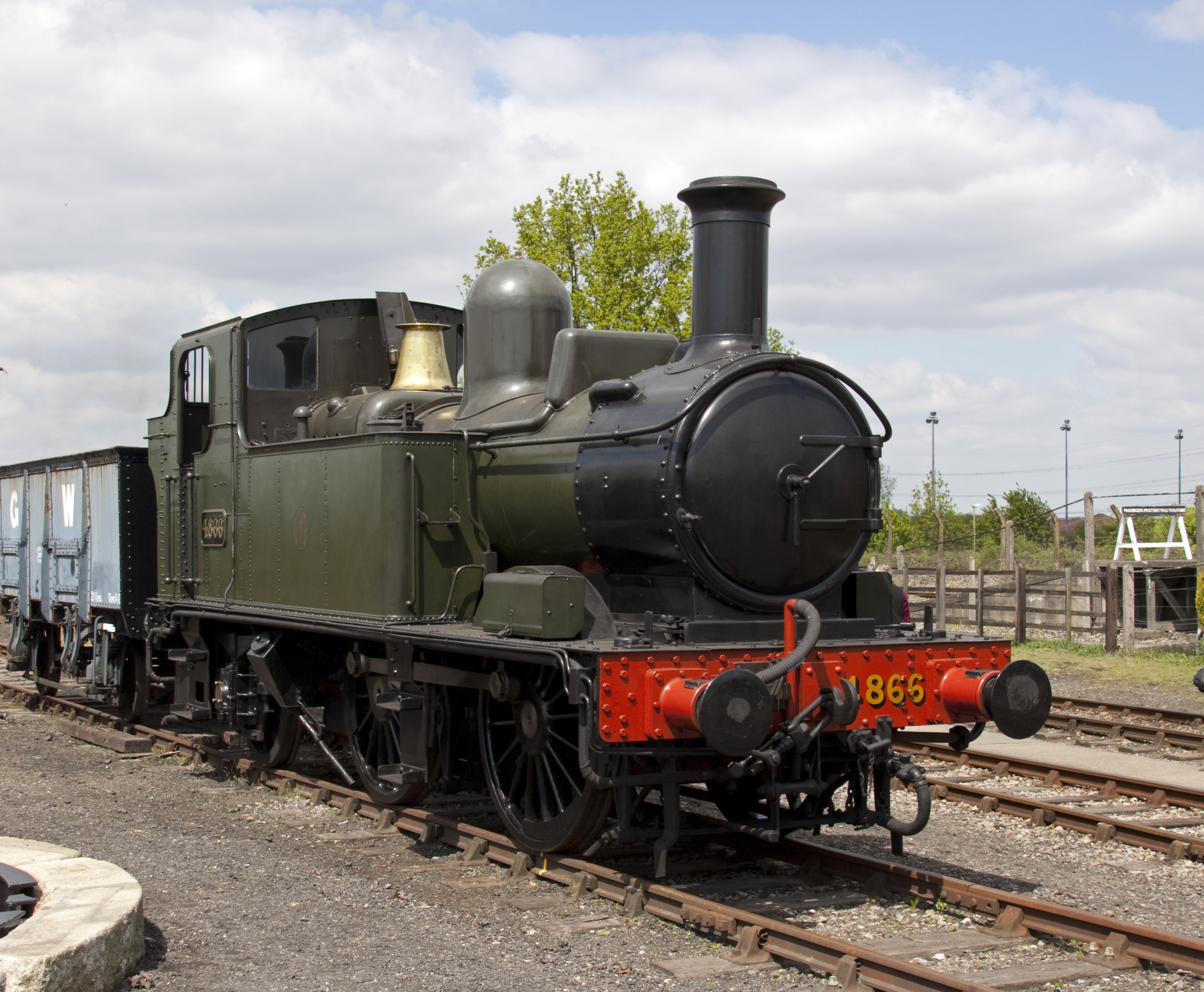
GWR 1400 Class No. 4866 at Didcot Railway Centre

From the mid-1860s onwards, the 0-4-2 wheel arrangement tended only to be used on tank engines in the United Kingdom. Exceptions were in Scotland on the Caledonian and Glasgow and South Western railways and in southern England on the London, Brighton and South Coast Railway (LB&SCR) and the London and South Western Railway. The LB&SCR uniquely built express passenger 0-4-2 tender classes until 1891.

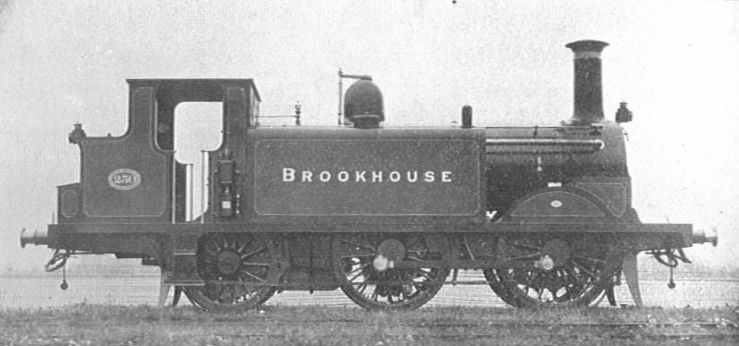
Stroudley's D-tank

From 1868, the Great Western Railway built a number of standard gauge 0-4-2T classes for branch line passenger work to a design known as the 517 class by engineer George Armstrong. This design was developed until the GWR 1400 Class was built between 1932 and 1936, designed for push-pull autotrains. These were the last British examples of this wheel arrangement. Four of them have been preserved.

William Stroudley of the LB&SCR built four very successful 0-4-2 classes, three tenders and one tank, between 1873 and 1891. The first of these was his powerful D-tank for suburban passenger work. By 1887, 125 of these had been built, some of which survived in service until 1951. However, the most famous 0-4-2 class were his Gladstone class express passenger locomotives, the first of which has been preserved.

=== United States ===
The Caspar, South Fork & Eastern Railroad used locomotive number two "Daisey", an 1885 Baldwin 0-4-2T locomotive hauling if its logging operations in its early days (Baldwin builder number 7558). That locomotive still survives and is on display next to the Skunk Train depot on Laurel Street in Fort Bragg.

Viewing the locomotive is free to the public in the little mall next door to the train depot. There is also an 18 in (457 mm) gauge 0-4-0T locomotive on display. That locomotive is California Western Railroad locomotive number 1 (was assembled in 1875 by a smaller locomotive manufacture, but serial numbers on the frame point to the Baldwin locomotive works).
