= South African Class NG2 0-4-2ST =

1897 narrow-gauge steam locomotive

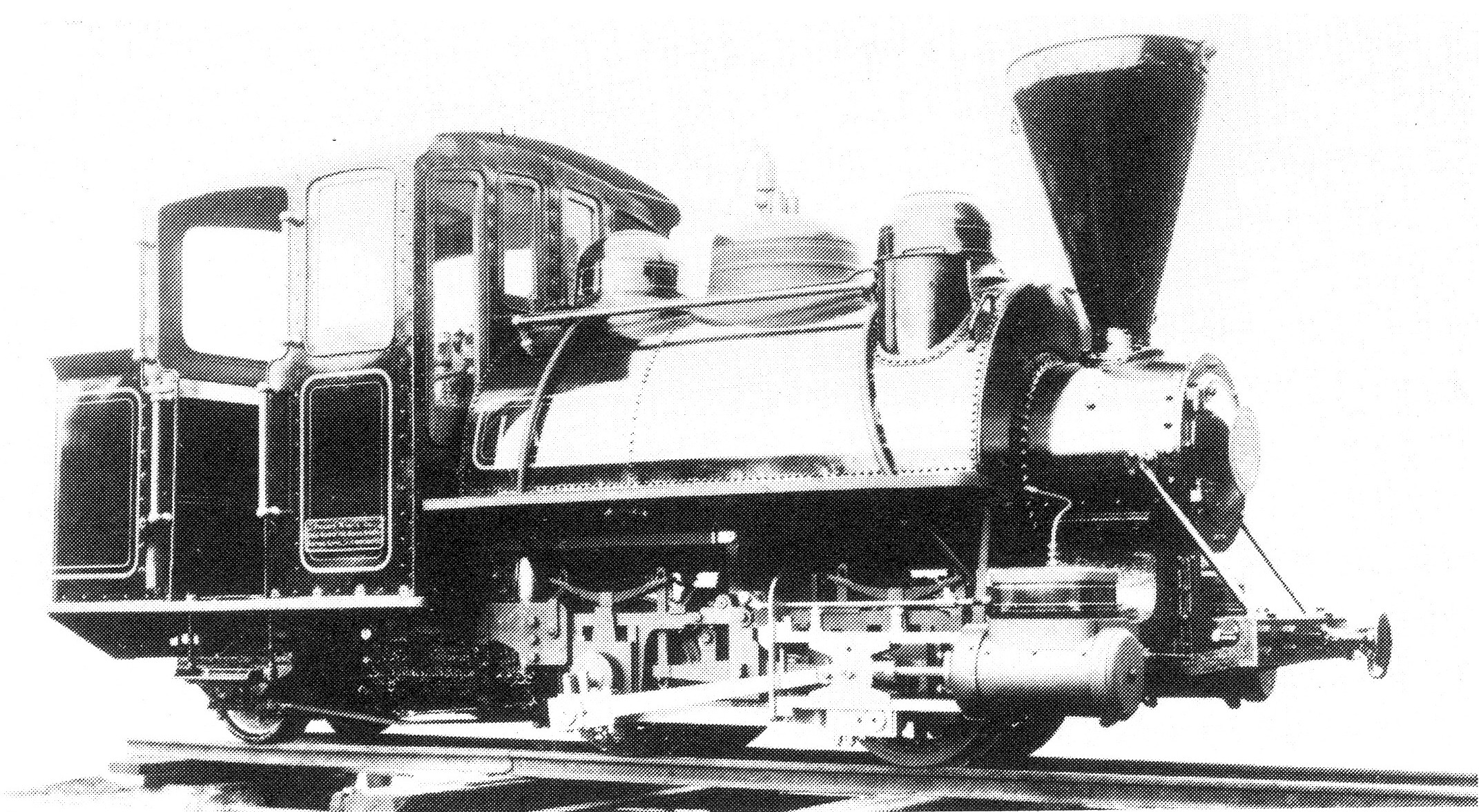
- Class NG2 with a saddle-tank, as built
Type and origin
- Power type: Steam
- Designer: Dickson Manufacturing Company
- Builder: Dickson Manufacturing Company
- Serial number: 978 & 1019
- Build date: 1897 & 1898
- Total produced: 2
- Rebuilder: South African Railways
- Number rebuilt: 2 to 0-4-2 tender
Specifications
- Configuration
  - Whyte: 0-4-2ST
  - UIC: B1n2t as built B1n2 modified
- Driver: 2nd coupled axle
- Gauge: 600 mm (1 ft 11 5/8 in) narrow
- Coupled dia.: 24 1/2 in (622 mm)
- Trailing dia.: 20 1/2 in (521 mm)
- Wheelbase: 10 ft 4 1/2 in (3,162 mm)
  - Coupled: 4 ft (1,219 mm)
- Length
  - Over couplers: 18 ft 10 in (5,740 mm)
  - Over beams: 17 ft 1 in (5,207 mm)
- Width: 6 ft 3 1/2 in (1,918 mm)
- Height: 8 ft 7 in (2,616 mm) over cab 8 ft 5 in (2,565 mm) over chimney
- Frame type: Bar
- Axle load: 4 LT (4,064 kg)
  - 1st coupled: 4 LT (4,064 kg)
  - 2nd coupled: 4 LT (4,064 kg)
  - Trailing: 3 LT (3,048 kg)
- Adhesive weight: 8 LT (8,128 kg)
- Loco weight: 11 LT (11,180 kg)
- Fuel type: Coal
- Fuel capacity: 2,150 lb (975 kg)
- Water cap.: 200 imp gal (909 L) as built
- Firebox
  - Type: Round-top
  - Grate area: 5.83 sq ft (0.542 m^{2})
- Boiler
  - Pitch: 3 ft 8 1/4 in (1,124 mm)
  - Diameter: 2 ft 2 7/8 in (683 mm)
  - Tube plates: 6 ft 8 1/2 in (2,045 mm)
  - Small tubes: 60: 1 1/2 in (38 mm)
- Boiler pressure: 130 psi (896 kPa)
- Safety valve: Ramsbottom (reboilered)
- Heating surface
  - Firebox: 33 sq ft (3.1 m^{2})
  - Tubes: 158 sq ft (14.7 m^{2})
  - Total surface: 191 sq ft (17.7 m^{2})
- Cylinders: Two
- Cylinder size: 7 in (178 mm) bore 10 in (254 mm) stroke
- Valve gear: Stephenson
- Valve type: Slide
- Couplers: Buffers-and-chain
Performance figures
- Power output: 106 hp (79 kW)
- Tractive effort: 1,950 lbf (8.7 kN) @ 75%
Career
- Operators: Rand Mines Limited; South African Railways
- Class: Class NG2
- Number in class: 2
- Numbers: NG93-NG94
- Delivered: 1897 & 1898
- First run: 1897
- Withdrawn: 1936

The South African Railways Class NG2 0-4-2ST of 1897 was a narrow-gauge steam locomotive from the pre-Union era in Transvaal.

Between 1897 and 1901, Arthur Koppel, acting as agent, imported a number of Dickson-built 0-4-2ST narrow-gauge steam locomotives for mines on the Witwatersrand. In 1915, when an urgent need arose for additional locomotives in German South West Africa during the First World War, two of the 0-4-2ST locomotives were purchased second-hand by the South African Railways, for use in that territory. They were later classified as Class NG2.

== Manufacturer ==
Between 1897 and 1901, several narrow-gauge 0-4-2ST steam locomotives, built by Dickson Manufacturing Company of Scranton in Pennsylvania shortly before it merged with seven other manufacturing firms to form the American Locomotive Company (ALCO) in 1901, were delivered to various gold mines on the Witwatersrand by Arthur Koppel, acting as importing agent.

== Characteristics ==
The engines had bar frames, with the cylinders arranged outside the frames and actuated by Stephenson valve gear. Their saddle-tanks had a 200 imperial gallons (909 litres) water capacity. Their operating boiler pressure was set at 130 pounds per square inch (896 kilopascals) and they had a 1,950 pounds-force (8.7 kilonewtons) tractive effort at 75% of boiler pressure.

== First World War ==
In 1915, shortly after the outbreak of the First World War, the German South West Africa colony was occupied by the Union Defence Forces. Since a large part of the territory's railway infrastructure was destroyed or damaged by retreating German forces, an urgent need arose for locomotives for use on the narrow-gauge lines in that territory. The South African Railways (SAR) therefore bought two of these Dickson-built 0-4-2ST locomotives second-hand, numbered them NG93 and NG94 and placed them in service in South West Africa (SWA).

== Identity ==
The identity of these locomotives is difficult to prove, but the SAR diagram book for the Class NG2 gives dimensions which limit the possibilities to only three of the known Koppel imports. Two of these, Dickson works numbers 978 of 1897 and 1019 of 1898, had been delivered to the Lancaster Gold Mine in Roodepoort. That mine closed in June 1913 and the company was wound up in early 1915. It therefore seems a good probability that it were these two locomotives which the SAR bought for service in SWA.

A third locomotive with the same dimensions, for which no ownership history is known, was Dickson works no. 1102 of 1899. It is possible, but unproven, that this locomotive also went to Lancaster Gold Mine, since it was of identical dimensions to the other two.

== Gauge ==
Although they were eventually classified as 2 ft (610 mm) locomotives along with the rest of the South African narrow-gauge locomotive fleet, they were actually constructed to 600 mm (1 ft 11 5/8 in) gauge.

Historically, the actual two-feet narrow-gauge rail spacing depended on whether or not the track was laid by a metricised country. German-built narrow-gauge lines in German South West Africa were therefore 600 mm (1 ft 11 5/8 in) gauge, while those in South Africa, built to Imperial standards, were 2 ft (610 mm) gauge.

In practice, however, the two gauges are still being treated as one and the same by, for example, the British Military. The same applied in South Africa, as part of the British Commonwealth at the time. The 3/8 inch (10 millimetres) difference was considered as insignificant and narrow-gauge locomotives regularly migrated between the lines laid to German standards in SWA and those laid to Imperial standards in South Africa.

== Service ==
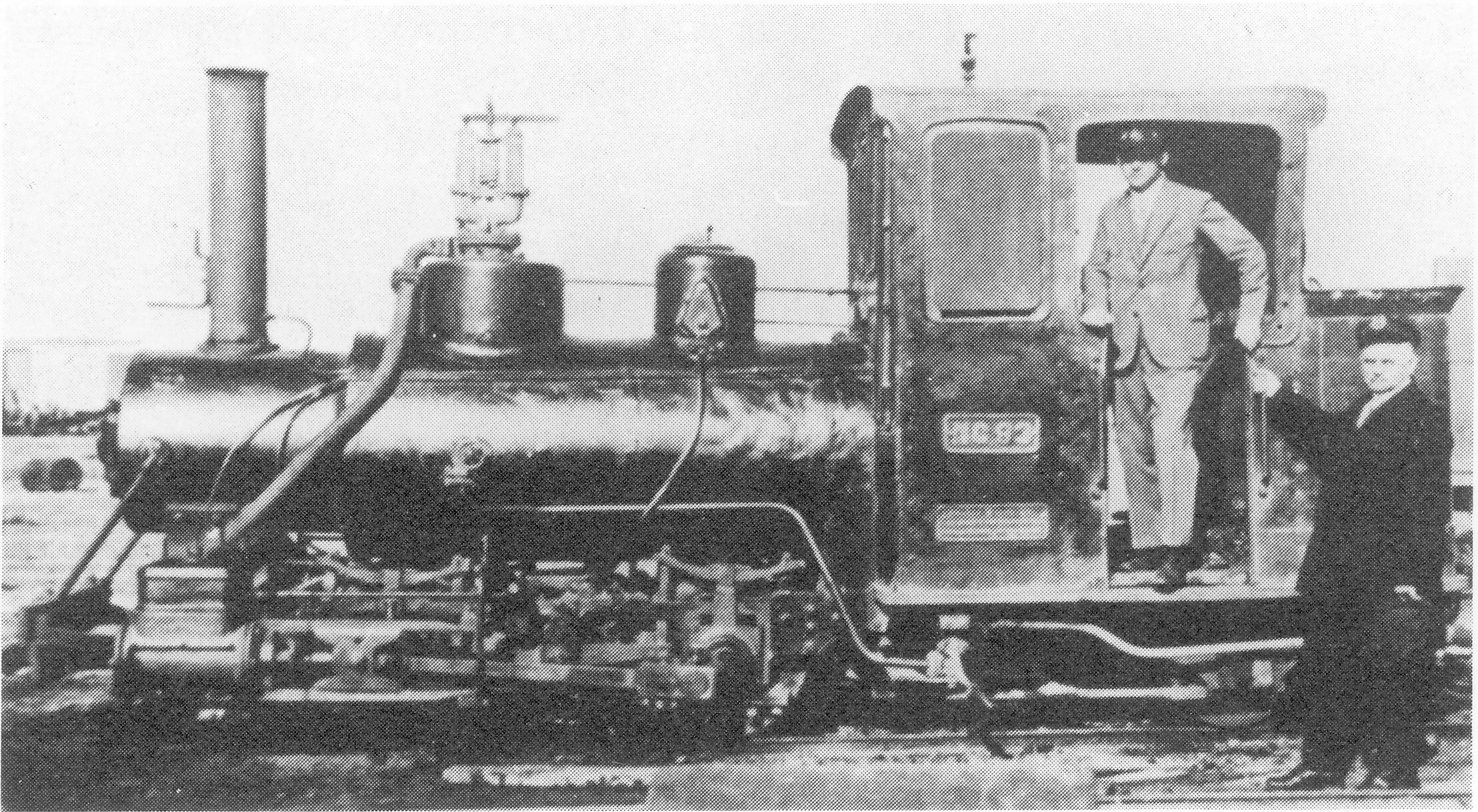
No. NG93 after rebuilding, without the saddle tanks

The two locomotives remained in SWA after the war. In 1920, they were both reboilered by the SAR using boilers supplied by Henschel and Son, and in the process they lost their saddle tanks. Since this modification effectively converted them to tankless tank locomotives, they were equipped with timber-bodied two-axle tenders to carry their water and additional coal.

== Classification ==
A system of grouping narrow-gauge locomotives into classes was only introduced on the SAR somewhere between 1928 and 1930. At that point, the two locomotives were designated Class NG2.

== Disposal ==
The Class NG2 locomotives spent their last working years on the SAR working at the Usakos workshops in SWA, until they were withdrawn from service in 1936. Engine no. NG93 was sold to the Zebediela citrus estates in northern Transvaal in 1937, where it was finally withdrawn from service by 1943. Engine no. NG94 was sold to Igusi Timbers in Rhodesia and remained in service there until c. 1961.
