= Cape Town Railway & Dock 0-4-2 =

South African steam locomotive

Cape Town Railway & Dock 0-4-2 CGR 0-4-2
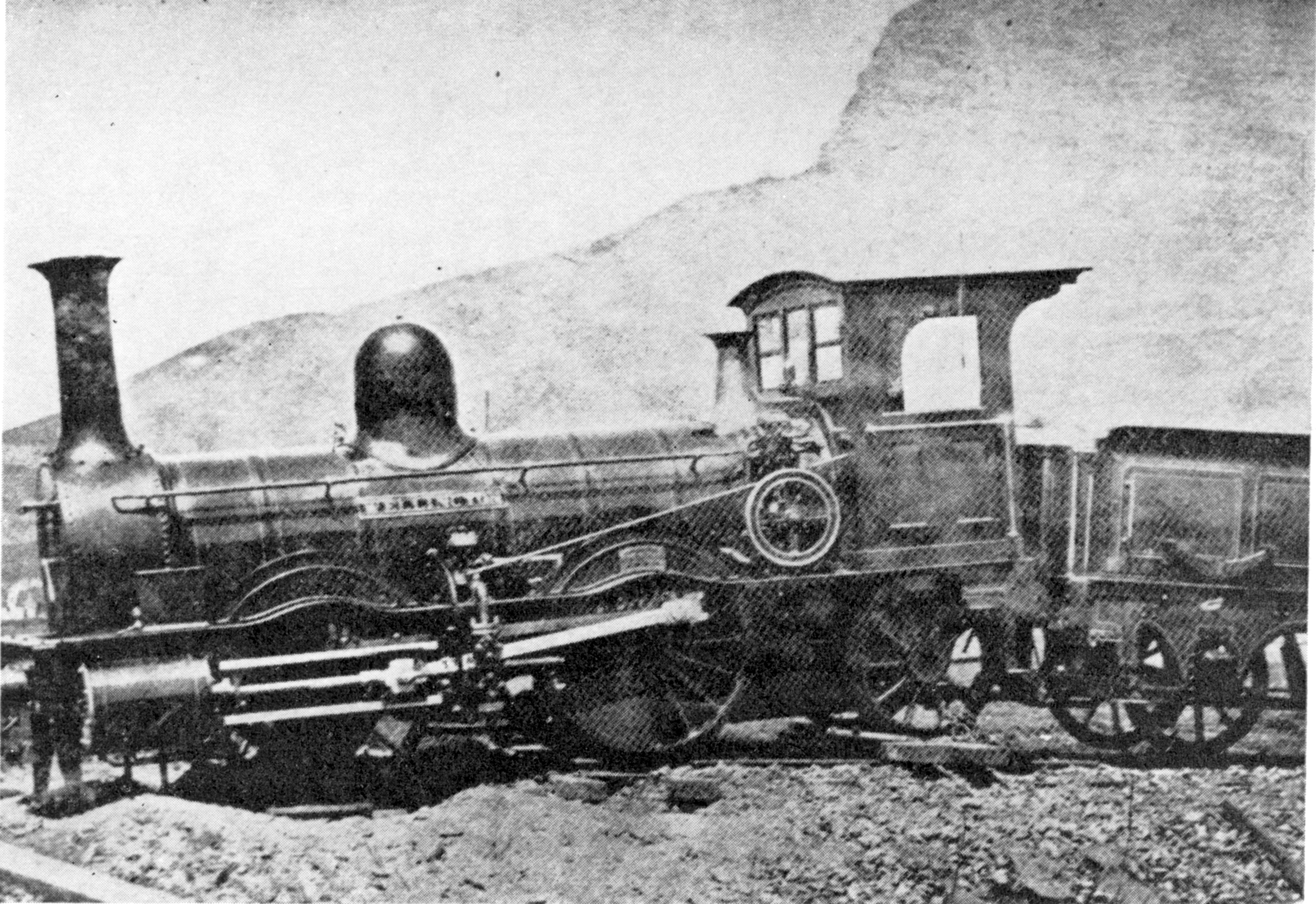
- No. 4 Wellington, derailed during labour unrest
Type and origin
- Power type: Steam
- Designer: R and W Hawthorn
- Builder: R and W Hawthorn
- Serial number: E1065-E1072
- Build date: 1859
- Total produced: 8
Specifications
- Configuration
  - Whyte: 0-4-2
  - UIC: B1n2
- Driver: 2nd coupled axle
- Gauge: 4 ft 8 1/2 in (1,435 mm) standard gauge
- Coupled dia.: 60 in (1,524 mm)
- Trailing dia.: 42 in (1,067 mm)
- Tender wheels: 42 in (1,067 mm)
- Wheelbase: 27 ft 7 in (8,407 mm)
  - Engine: 13 ft 9 1/2 in (4,204 mm)
  - Coupled: 7 ft 3 in (2,210 mm)
  - Tender: 7 ft 3 in (2,210 mm)
- Length
  - Over couplers: 39 ft 1 in (11,913 mm)
  - Over beams: 37 ft 3 in (11,354 mm)
- Height: 11 ft 9 in (3,581 mm)
- Frame type: Plate
- Axle load
  - Leading: 11 LT (11,180 kg)
  - 1st coupled: 8 LT (8,128 kg)
  - 2nd coupled: 11 LT (11,180 kg)
  - Trailing: 5 LT (5,080 kg)
- Adhesive weight: 19 LT (19,300 kg)
- Loco weight: 24 LT (24,390 kg)
- Tender weight: 15 LT (15,240 kg)
- Total weight: 39 LT (39,630 kg)
- Tender type: 2-axle
- Fuel type: Coal
- Water cap.: 1,250 imp gal (5,700 L)
- Firebox
  - Type: Round-top
- Boiler
  - Pitch: 5 ft 6 1/2 in (1,689 mm)
  - Small tubes: 185: 2 1/16 in (52 mm)
- Boiler pressure: 120 psi (827 kPa)
- Heating surface
  - Firebox: 85 sq ft (7.9 m^{2})
  - Tubes: 1,125 sq ft (104.5 m^{2})
  - Total surface: 1,210 sq ft (112 m^{2})
- Cylinders: Two outside
- Cylinder size: 16 in (406 mm) bore 22 in (559 mm) stroke
- Valve gear: Stephenson
- Loco brake: Wooden brake blocks Hand brake on tender only
- Train brakes: None
- Couplers: Buffers-and-chain
Career
- Operators: Cape Town Railway & Dock; Cape Government Railways
- Number in class: 8
- Numbers: 1-8
- Delivered: 1860
- First run: 1860
- Last run: 1881
- Withdrawn: 1881

The Cape Town Railway & Dock 0-4-2 of 1860 was a South African steam locomotive from the pre-Union era in the Cape of Good Hope.

In 1860, the Cape Town Railway and Dock Company took delivery of eight 4 ft 8 1/2 in (1,435 mm) broad gauge tender locomotives with a 0-4-2 wheel arrangement, the first tender locomotives to work in South Africa. They were acquired for service on the Cape Town-Wellington railway, which was still under construction.

In 1872, these locomotives came onto the roster of the Cape Government Railways, which took over the operation of all railways in the Cape of Good Hope. They remained in service on the Wellington line while it was being converted to dual broad-and-Cape gauges from 1872, and were only retired in 1881 when sufficient Cape gauge locomotives were in service.

== The Cape Town-Wellington Railway ==
Cape Town Railway and Dock Act 1855
- Act of Parliament
- Parliament of the United Kingdom
- Long title: An Act for incorporating "The Cape Town Railway and Dock Company," and for other Purposes connected therewith.
- Citation: 18 & 19 Vict. c. cxl

Dates
- Royal assent: 16 July 1855

Other legislation
- Repealed by: Cape Railway Act 1867

Status: Repealed

Text of statute as originally enacted

The first railway line in the Cape of Good Hope, the Cape Town-Wellington Railway, was built by the Cape Town Railway and Dock Company, incorporated by the Cape Town Railway and Dock Act 1855 (18 & 19 Vict. c. cxl). After having made representations to the Cape Colonial Government in 1853 and 1855, the company was granted approval, by Act no. 10 of 29 June 1857, to construct a 57-mile (92-kilometre) long railway between Cape Town and Wellington, via Stellenbosch. The company appointed Messrs. E. & J. Pickering as contractors for the construction of the line.

The act specified, amongst others, that:

- The locomotives for the railway should have only four wheels, since this would require less room inside buildings and would only need an 11-foot (132-inch; 3,353-millimetre) turntable.
- A locomotive, complete with apparatus and appendages, should only weigh 6 long tons (6.7 short tons; 6.1 tonnes).
- Each locomotive have to be shopped, cleaned and, if necessary, repaired after every three days of work.
- Double the number of locomotives as required by the volume of traffic should therefore be kept in use.
- At least twelve locomotives should be ordered, at a nominal figure of £800 each.

Since locomotive design had already advanced beyond the Cape Government's 1857 specifications, the maximum weight and wheel arrangement specifications were ignored by the Cape Town Railway and Dock Company. Even the contractor's small 0-4-0T construction engine was more than twice the specified weight, exceeding the limit by 8 long tons (9.0 short tons; 8.1 tonnes).

As in England, it was decided to use 4 ft 8 1/2 in (1,435 mm) "broad" gauge. The first sod was turned on 31 March 1859 by Sir George Grey, Governor of the Cape Colony from 1854 to 1861, but the planned railhead at Wellington was only reached on 4 November 1863, after the contractors, Messrs. E. & J. Pickering, had been dismissed in October 1861 and construction was taken over by the Company itself.

== Manufacturer ==
In 1859, an order was placed with R and W Hawthorn in Newcastle upon Tyne in England for eight 0-4-2 tender locomotives. These engines, which arrived in two shipments on 20 March and 28 April 1860, were given names and were numbered from 1 to 8. Since the full complement of engines arrived when the construction of the line to Wellington had barely begun, they were erected and placed on display for the public, while awaiting the completion of sufficient track to be useful. They eventually entered service on 20 October 1860.

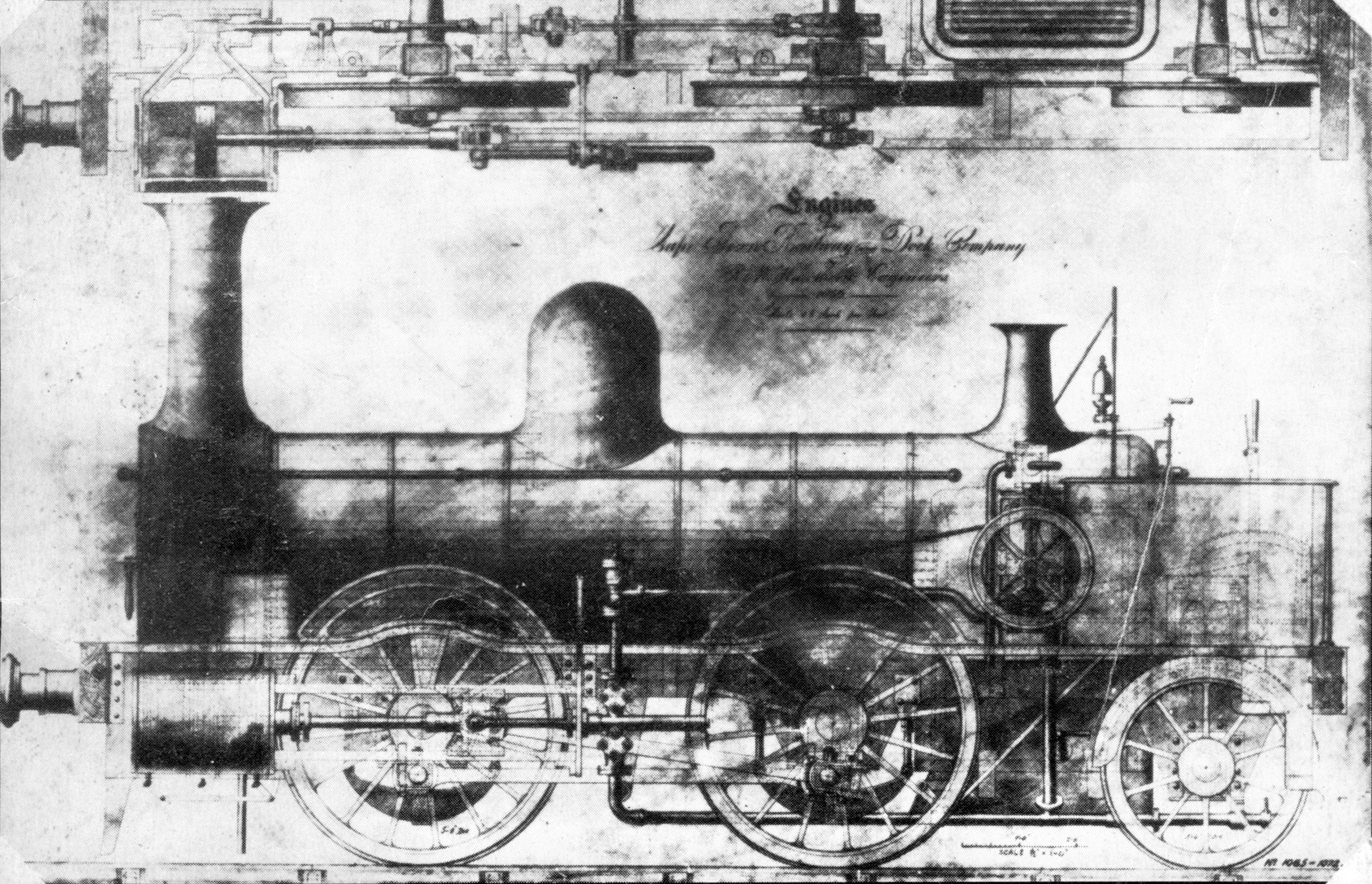
Works drawing, without tender

The locomotives were the first tender locomotives to work in South Africa. They were painted in a green livery, very similar in shade to that of the Great Western Railway in England. It was to become the standard passenger livery of the Cape Government Railways, right up to the establishment of the South African Railways in 1910. The locomotives were delivered without cabs, but cab sides and a roof were soon installed in addition to the weatherboard to offer better protection to the crew.

== Service ==
=== Cape Town Railway and Dock ===
The public was allowed to ride for the first time on 26 December 1860, on the line which was only to reach Salt River on 8 February 1861, a distance of only 1 1/2 miles (2.4 kilometres) which took the contractor nearly two years to complete. This snail's pace led to a dispute between Cape Town Railway and Dock and the contractor, which eventually ended in sabotage in October 1861. Upon being dismissed, the disgruntled contractor employees ran one of the new locomotives, no. 4 Wellington, into a culvert, with the result that it had to be sent to the newly established workshops at Salt River to have some serious damage repaired.

Since the locomotives were very free-steaming, they ran well and speeds of 30 miles per hour (48 kilometres per hour) were common. On one occasion a train, with the unpopular Cape Governor Sir Philip Wodehouse on board, reached 60 miles per hour (97 kilometres per hour) on the section between D'Urban Road (now Bellville) and Salt River.

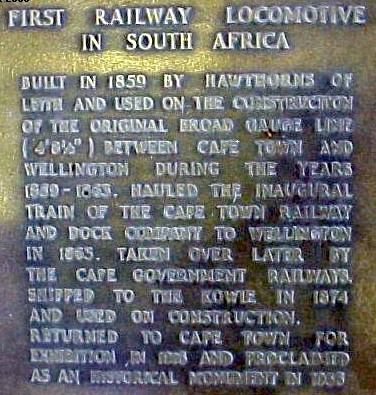
Plaque mounted on Blackie's plinth

The line from Cape Town to Wellington took nearly five years to complete. The line to Eersterivier was officially opened on 13 February 1862. Stellenbosch was reached on 1 May 1862 and the railhead at Wellington on 4 November 1863. Work was completed about a year later. From Wellington, the only option for travellers who wished to go further inland was by road across the Bain's Kloof Pass, which had been completed in 1853.

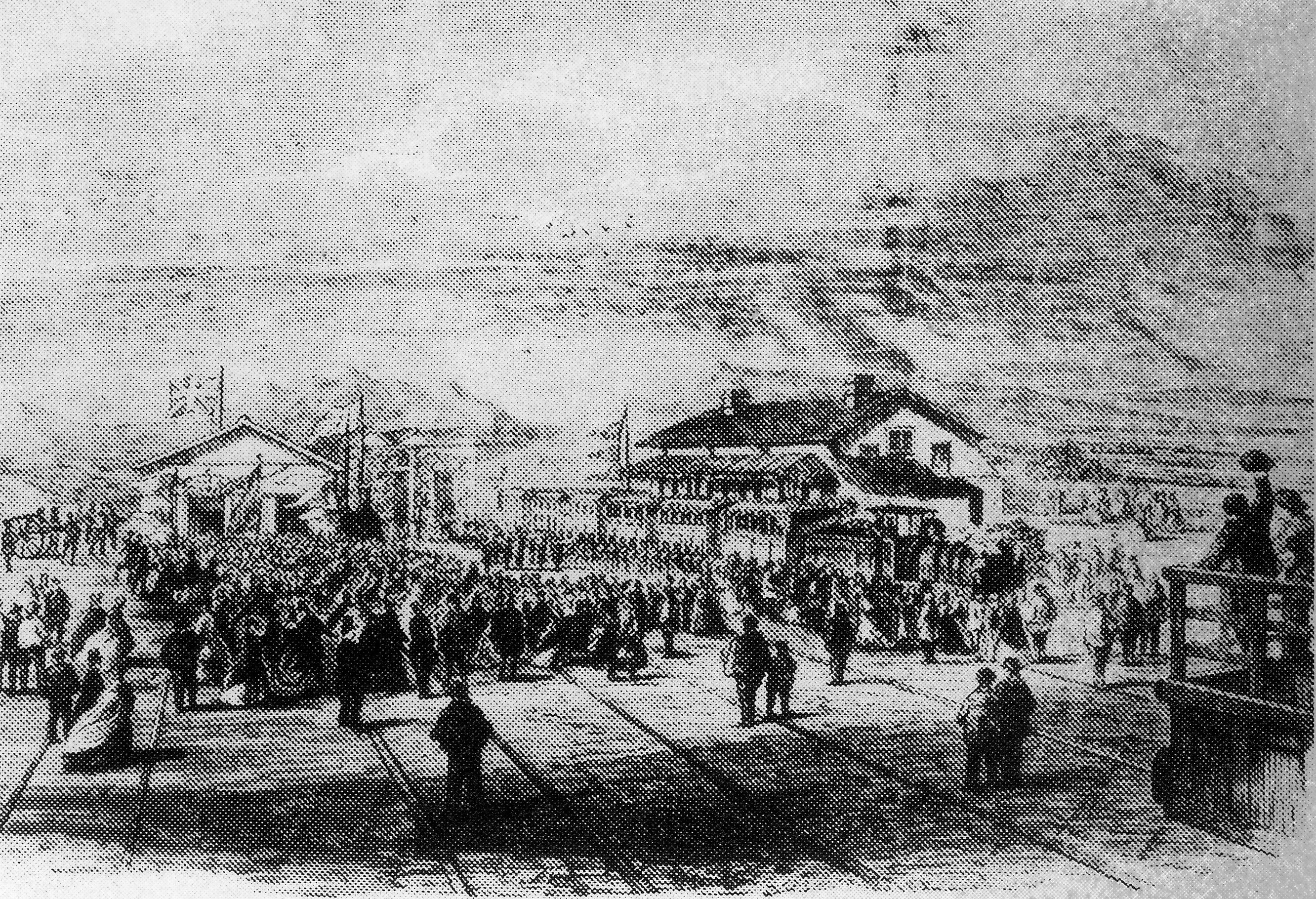
Arrival of the inaugural train at Wellington Station, behind a tender locomotive

According to the plaque attached to the plinth base of the first locomotive in South Africa at Cape Town station, construction engine no. 9 Blackie had the honour, in 1865, to haul the official inaugural train of the company's Cape Town-Wellington Railway to Wellington. The inscription on the plaque is untrue, however, since an engraving which depicts the arrival of the inaugural train at Wellington Station shows the train behind one of these eight 0-4-2 tender locomotives and not behind Blackie, which was probably still a 0-4-0 side-tank locomotive at the time. One of these eight tender engines had hauled the first train from Cape Town to Eersterivier on 13 February 1862 and also the official train during the opening ceremony at Wellington on 4 November 1863.

=== Cape Government Railways ===
In 1872, the Cape Government purchased the Cape Town-Wellington and Salt River-Wynberg railways, took over the operation of all railways in the Colony except the Namaqualand Railway and established the Cape Government Railways. Shortly before, it had been decided to continue railway construction from Wellington into the interior, but to use the narrower 3 ft 6 in (1,067 mm) gauge, since it would decrease the cost of construction through the difficult terrain beyond the coastal plain and up the Hex River mountains.

While this new line was being constructed, the original Cape Town-Wellington line was dual-gauged, working back from Wellington to Cape Town. The same was done on the Wynberg line. The Cape Town-Wellington and Salt River-Wynberg sections were eventually worked by locomotives of both gauges.

== Disposal ==
The locomotives remained in service until 1881, when sufficient numbers of Cape gauge locomotives were in service and it was decided to remove all broad gauge track and rolling stock. The broad gauge track's 65 pounds per yard (32.2 kilograms per metre) iron rails were lifted and the track was relaid to Cape gauge as rapidly as possible, using 70 pounds per yard (34.7 kilograms per metre) steel rail sections on creosoted wooden sleepers.

All the broad gauge 0-4-2 locomotives were dismantled, with the exception of their boilers. These were thoroughly overhauled, converted into stationary boilers and used to drive workshop machinery.

== Works numbers ==
The locomotive numbers, R and W Hawthorn works numbers and names are listed in the table.

Cape Town Railway & Dock 0-4-2
Loco no.	Works no.	Name
1	E1065	Sir George Grey
2	E1066	Zuid Afrikaan
3	E1067	Cape Town
4	E1068	Wellington
5	E1069	Paarl
6	E1070	Stellenbosch
7	E1071	D'Urban
8	E1072	Malmesbury
