= NZASM 19 Tonner 0-4-2T =

South African steam locomotive

NZASM 19 Tonner 0-4-2T CSAR Railmotor Engine 0-4-2T South African Railmotor Engine 0-4-2T
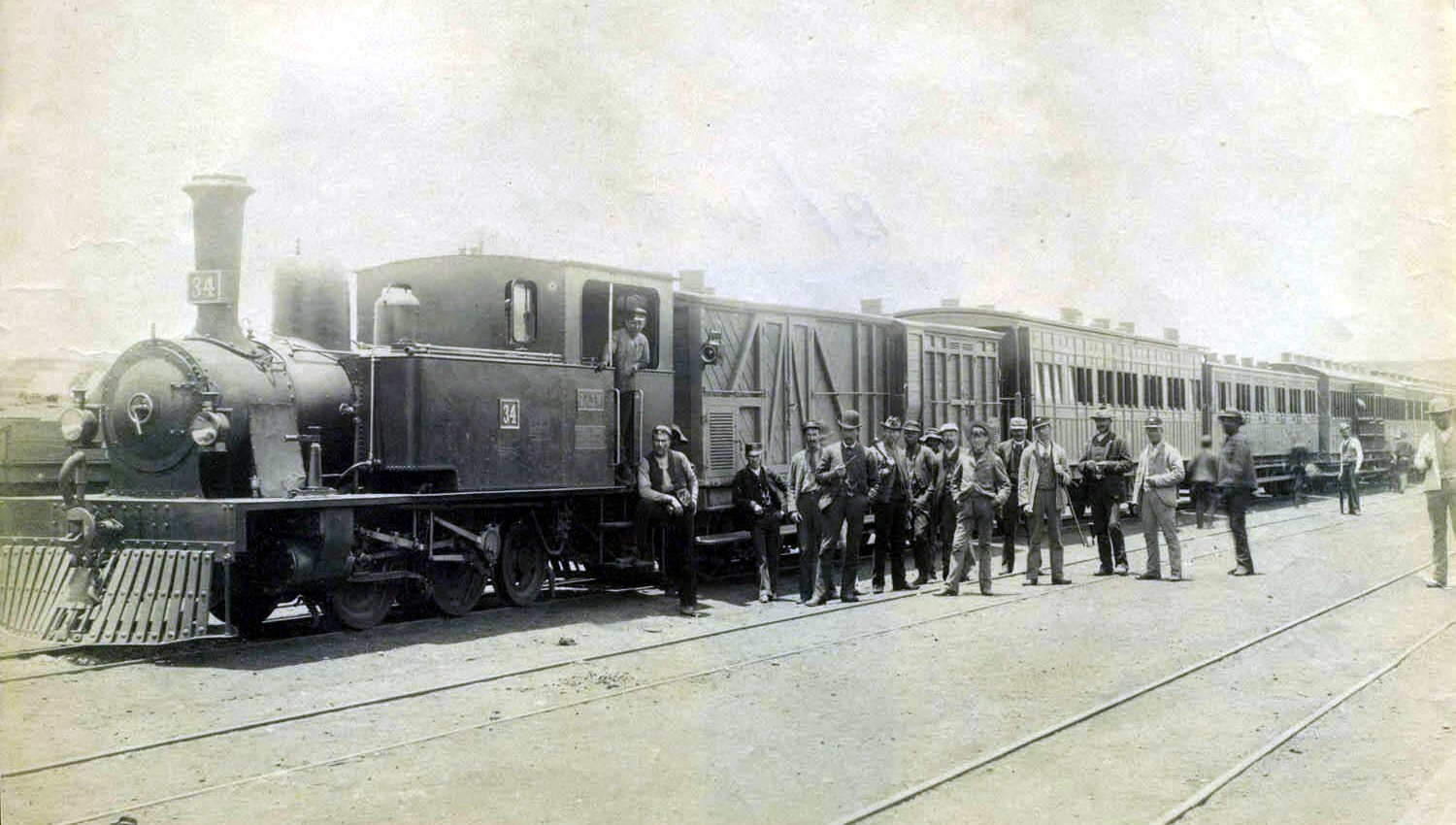
- 19 Tonner no. 34 at Johannesburg Station on the first train to reach Johannesburg from Cape Town, 15 September 1892
Type and origin
- Power type: Steam
- Designer: Maschinenfabrik Esslingen
- Builder: Maschinenfabrik Esslingen; Machinefabriek Breda v/h Backer & Rueb
- Serial number: Esslingen 2366-2370, 2408-2412 & 2506-2513, Breda 83-88
- Build date: 1890-1892
- Total produced: 24
- Rebuilder: Central South African Railways
- Rebuild date: 1906, 1908-1909
- Number rebuilt: 10 to railmotor engines
Specifications
- Configuration
  - Whyte: 0-4-2T (Olomana)
  - UIC: B1n2t
- Driver: 2nd coupled axle
- Gauge: 3 ft 6 in (1,067 mm) Cape gauge
- Coupled dia.: 43 7/16 in (1,103 mm)
- Trailing dia.: 30 in (762 mm)
- Wheelbase: 8 ft 2 1/2 in (2,502 mm)
  - Coupled: 4 ft 6 3/8 in (1,381 mm)
- Length
  - Over couplers: 25 ft 1 1/8 in (7,649 mm)
- Height: 11 ft 8 1/16 in (3,558 mm)
- Frame type: Plate
- Axle load
  - 1st coupled: 6 LT 5 cwt (6,350 kg)
  - 2nd coupled: 6 LT 5 cwt (6,350 kg)
  - Trailing: 6 LT 10 cwt (6,604 kg)
- Adhesive weight: 12 LT 10 cwt (12,700 kg)
- Loco weight: 19 LT (19,300 kg)
- Fuel type: Coal
- Fuel capacity: 1 LT 10 cwt (1.5 t)
- Water cap.: 550 imp gal (2,500 L)
- Firebox
  - Type: Round-top
  - Grate area: 7.2 sq ft (0.67 m^{2})
- Boiler
  - Pitch: 5 ft 6 3/4 in (1,695 mm)
  - Diameter: 3 ft 2 1/2 in (978 mm) outside
  - Tube plates: 8 ft 1/8 in (2,442 mm)
  - Small tubes: 95: 1 3/4 in (44 mm)
- Boiler pressure: 160 psi (1,103 kPa)
- Safety valve: Salter
- Heating surface
  - Firebox: 38.2 sq ft (3.55 m^{2})
  - Tubes: 388.4 sq ft (36.08 m^{2})
  - Total surface: 426.6 sq ft (39.63 m^{2})
- Cylinders: Two
- Cylinder size: 11 in (279 mm) bore 21 21/32 in (550 mm) stroke
- Valve gear: Allan
- Valve type: Murdoch's D slide
- Couplers: Johnston link-and-pin
Performance figures
- Tractive effort: 7,744 lbf (34.45 kN) @ 75%
Career
- Operators: NZASM; Imperial Military Railways; Central South African Railways; South African Railways
- Class: NZASM 19 Tonner
- Number in class: 24
- Numbers: NZASM 15-38; IMR 612-635; CSAR F-V, then M1 & M3-M11
- Official name: 19 Tonner
- Delivered: 1891
- First run: 1891

The NZASM 19 Tonner 0-4-2T of 1891 was a South African steam locomotive from the pre-Union era in Transvaal.

In 1891 and 1892, the Nederlandsche-Zuid-Afrikaansche Spoorweg-Maatschappij of the Zuid-Afrikaansche Republiek (Transvaal Republic) placed 24 tank locomotives with a 0-4-2 wheel arrangement in service.

Between 1906 and 1909, ten of them were converted to railmotor engines by the Central South African Railways, for use on suburban passenger services.

== Manufacturers ==
The first ten of eventually twenty-four tank locomotives with a 0-4-2 wheel arrangement, built in two batches of five by Emil Kessler's Maschinenfabrik Esslingen in 1890, were placed in service by the Nederlandsche-Zuid-Afrikaansche Spoorweg-Maatschappij (NZASM) in 1891 and numbered in the range from 21 to 30. Since the NZASM classified its locomotives according to their weight, these engines were known as 19 Tonners.

Since they proved to be useful locomotives, an order for six more of the type was placed with Machinefabriek Breda voorheen Backer & Rueb (Breda machine factory, formerly Backer & Rueb). They were built in 1891 and 1892 and were numbered in the range from 15 to 20. For some reason, possibly their delivery sequence, their numbering was not in the same sequence as their works numbers.

Eight more 19 Tonners were delivered from Maschinenfabrik Esslingen in 1892, numbered in the range from 31 to 38.

== Characteristics ==
The locomotive's trailing wheels were positioned below the firebox. The cylinders were arranged outside the frames, with flat Murdoch's D slide valves arranged at an incline above the cylinders and actuated by Allan straight link valve gear, driven by eccentric sheaves which were mounted on a return crank. The brakes were actuated by hand screw from the cab. The engine had 4 inches (102 millimetres) thick wooden buffer beams and was equipped with cowcatchers.

== Service ==
=== NZASM ===
At the time the 19 Tonners entered service, the Randtram line and the extensions towards the east to Springs and towards the west to Roodepoort were open. The extension from Roodepoort to Krugersdorp was opened on 10 February 1891, while the extension from Germiston to Pretoria was still in progress and would only be completed in December 1892. These are the lines on which the 19 Tonners entered service.

=== Imperial Military Railways ===
All railway operations in the two Boer Republics, the Zuid-Afrikaansche Republiek (ZAR) and the Oranje-Vrijstaat (OVS), were taken over by the Imperial Military Railways (IMR) in 1899 during the Second Boer War. The IMR renumbered the 19 Tonners in the range from 612 to 635.

=== Central South African Railways ===
At the end of the war, when the IMR was transformed into the Central South African Railways (CSAR), 22 of the 19 Tonners had survived the hostilities. Five, IMR numbers 613 and 631 and three more, had been sold by the IMR. The other seventeen were renumbered by the CSAR in the letter range from F to V, following on from the 18 Tonner renumbering.

Three 19 Tonners were retired from CSAR service and converted to stationary boilers, numbered in the range from 1735 to 1737. Between 1906 and 1909, ten of them were converted to railmotor engines for use on suburban passenger services. This entailed being semi-permanently coupled to a modified side-door suburban passenger carriage which contained a driving cab at the rear, with the regulator, reversing gear and brake controls arranged so that the push-pull unit could be driven from either vehicle. These railmotor engines were renumbered M1 and in the range from M3 to M11.

Railmotor coach no. M1 seated 28 1st Class and 24 2nd Class passengers. It was 86 feet 9 3/4 inches (26,460 millimetres) long between couplers, with a tare of 58,200 pounds (26,399 kilograms). The total weight of the engine and coach was 45 long tons (45,720 kilograms).

The skipped railmotor engine number was allocated to a Kitson-built railmotor with a 56-seat passenger capacity which was placed in service in 1907. In service, the imported railmotor no. M2 was found to be less satisfactory than the home-built railmotor engine no. M1, which was considered to be superior in aspects like design, passenger comfort, economy in running and convenience in working. Since the imported railmotor was a single vehicle, the carriage was unusable while the engine had to be withdrawn for service or repairs. The Pretoria-built modified carriage was still readily detachable from the locomotive and both engine and carriage were still complete units which could be used independently of each other.

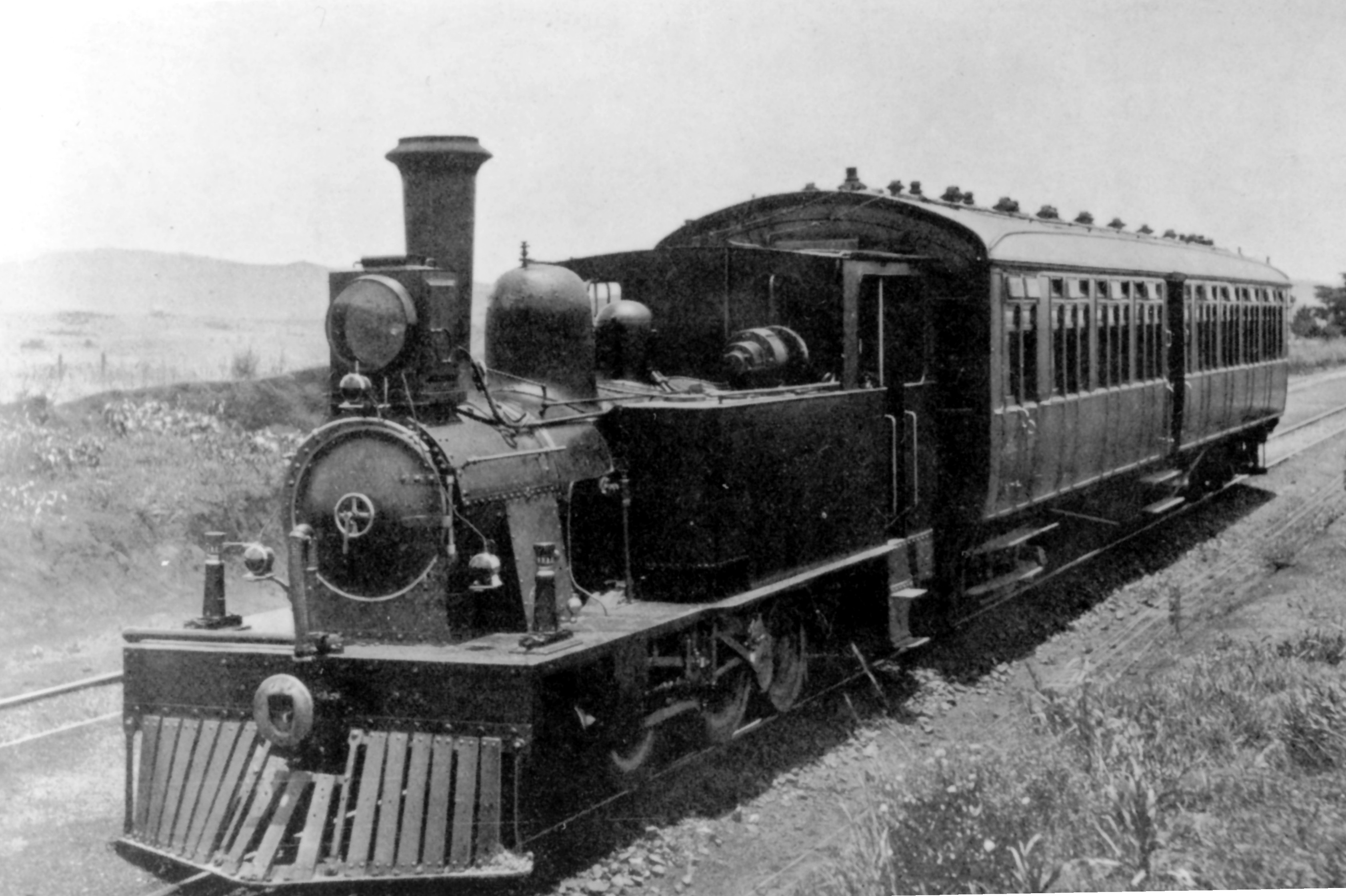
19 Tonner railmotor engine

The initial service on the Pretoria-Rissik and Pretoria-Wonderboom sections attracted so many passengers that it soon became necessary to run a three-coach train. Since several 19 Tonners were standing idle, no more railmotors were ordered and, instead, another nine 19 Tonners were converted to railmotor engines and renumbered in the range from M3 to M11. Between 1906 and 1909, steam railmotor services were expanded to operate on four routes:

- Hatherley-Pretoria-Wonderboom.
- Elsburg-Germiston-Rietfontein Mine.
- Luipaardsvlei-Krugersdorp-Randfontein.
- Germiston-Geduld.

=== South African Railways ===
When the Union of South Africa was established on 31 May 1910, the three Colonial government railways (Cape Government Railways, Natal Government Railways and CSAR) were united under a single administration to control and administer the railways, ports and harbours of the Union. Although the South African Railways and Harbours came into existence in 1910, the actual classification and renumbering of all the rolling stock of the three constituent railways was only implemented with effect from 1 January 1912.

In 1912, the ten railmotor engines were taken onto the SAR roster as unclassified locomotives, since they were considered obsolete. Since they were excluded from the SAR renumbering schedules, they retained their CSAR engine numbers, but at some stage their boilers were allocated SAR boiler numbers in the range 4000 and 4002 to 4010. The skipped no. 4001 was used for the Kitson railmotor's boiler. All of them were withdrawn from service by 1921.

=== Industry ===
At least five 19 Tonners were sold to industry before the formation of the CSAR. Known locomotives in industrial service were one at Coronation Colliery, one at Douglas Colliery and one at Transvaal Coal Trust in Brakpan, which later went to Ogies Colliery. The one at Ogies was only scrapped c. 1930 and may have been the last survivor.

The Douglas Colliery locomotive was their no. 1 and was named Douglas. It bore a Breda works plate and was therefore one of the batch from the NZASM number range from 15 to 20. Since, out of the Breda group, NZASM no. 16 is the only one which definitely did not pass to the CSAR, and since there is uncertainty over whether or not NZASM no. 20 became one of CSAR numbers J, K or L, it follows that either no. 16 or no. 20 became Douglas Colliery no. 1.

== Works numbers and renumbering ==
The 19 Tonner NZASM numbers, builders, works numbers, years built, IMR renumbering, CSAR renumbering, CSAR railmotor engine conversion date or stationary boiler renumbering, and SAR boiler numbering are listed in the table.

NZASM 19 Tonner 0-4-2T works numbers and renumbering
NZASM no.	Builder	Works no.	Year built	IMR no.	CSAR no.	CSAR RME or st. boiler no.	SAR boiler no.
15	Breda	85	1891-92	612	F	M 4 (1908–11)	4003
16	Breda	86	1891-92	613			
17	Breda	87	1891-92	614	G	M 1 (1906–04)	4000
18	Breda	88	1891-92	615	H		
19	Breda	83	1891-92	616	I	M 8 (1909–07)	4007
20	Breda	84	1891-92	617	J, K, L?		
21	Esslingen	2366	1890	618	J, K, L?	St. Blr. 1735	
22	Esslingen	2367	1890	619	J, K, L?		
23	Esslingen	2368	1890	620	J, K, L?		
24	Esslingen	2369	1890	621	M	M11 (1909)	4010
25	Esslingen	2370	1890	622	N	M 5 (1909–07)	4004
26	Esslingen	2408	1890	623	O	M 6 (1909–06)	4005
27	Esslingen	2409	1890	624	P	M 7 (1909–06)	4006
28	Esslingen	2410	1890	625	Q	M10 (1909)	4009
29	Esslingen	2411	1890	626	R, S?	St. Blr. 1736	
30	Esslingen	2412	1890	627	R, S?		
31	Esslingen	2506	1892	628	R, S?		
32	Esslingen	2507	1892	629	R, S?		
33	Esslingen	2508	1892	630	T	M 3 (1908–10)	4002
34	Esslingen	2509	1892	631			
35	Esslingen	2510	1892	632	U	M 9 (1909)	4008
36	Esslingen	2511	1892	633	V?		
37	Esslingen	2512	1892	634	V?	St. Blr. 1737	
38	Esslingen	2513	1892	635	V?		

== Illustration ==
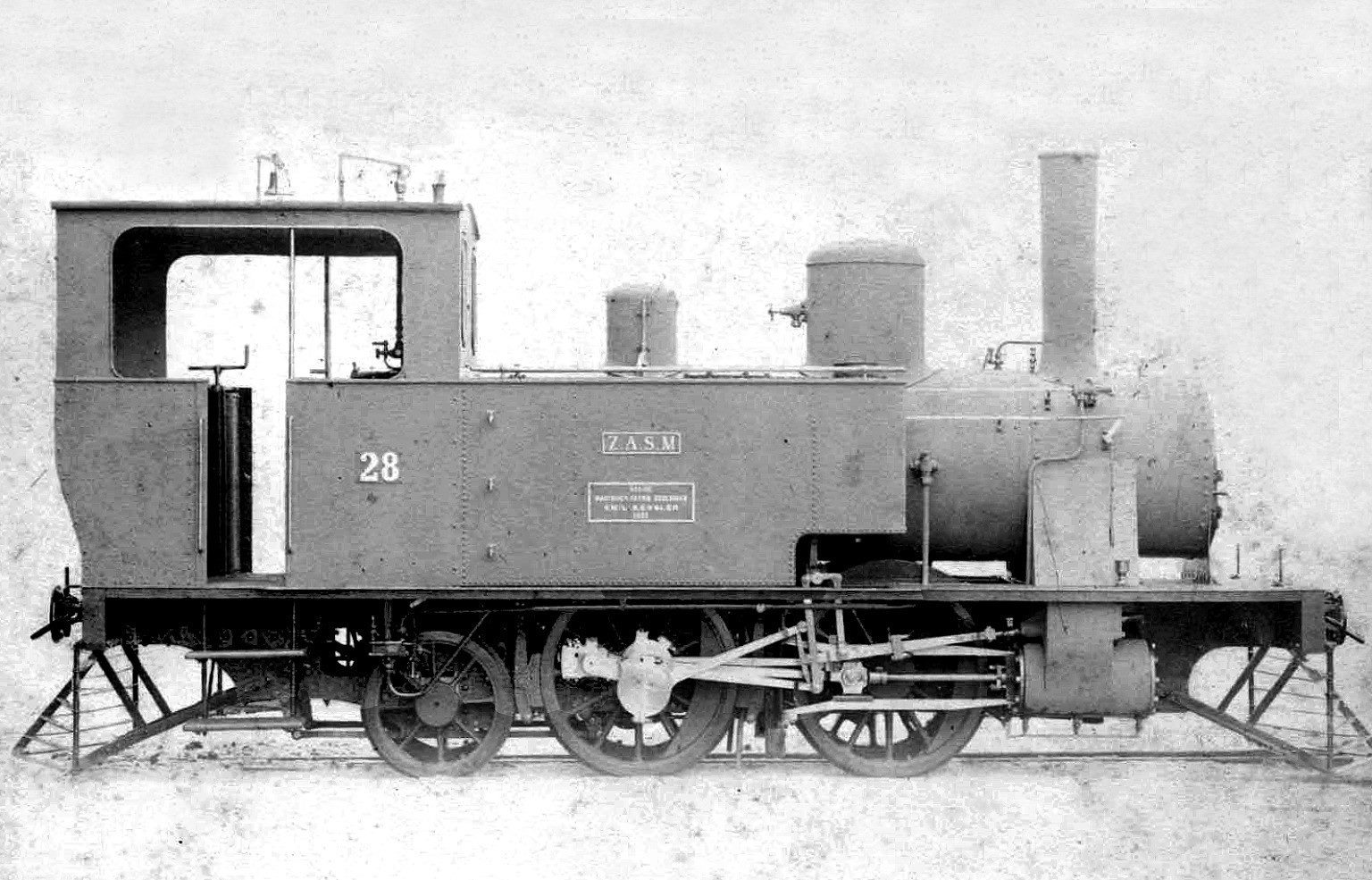
Esslingen-built no. 28, c. 1891

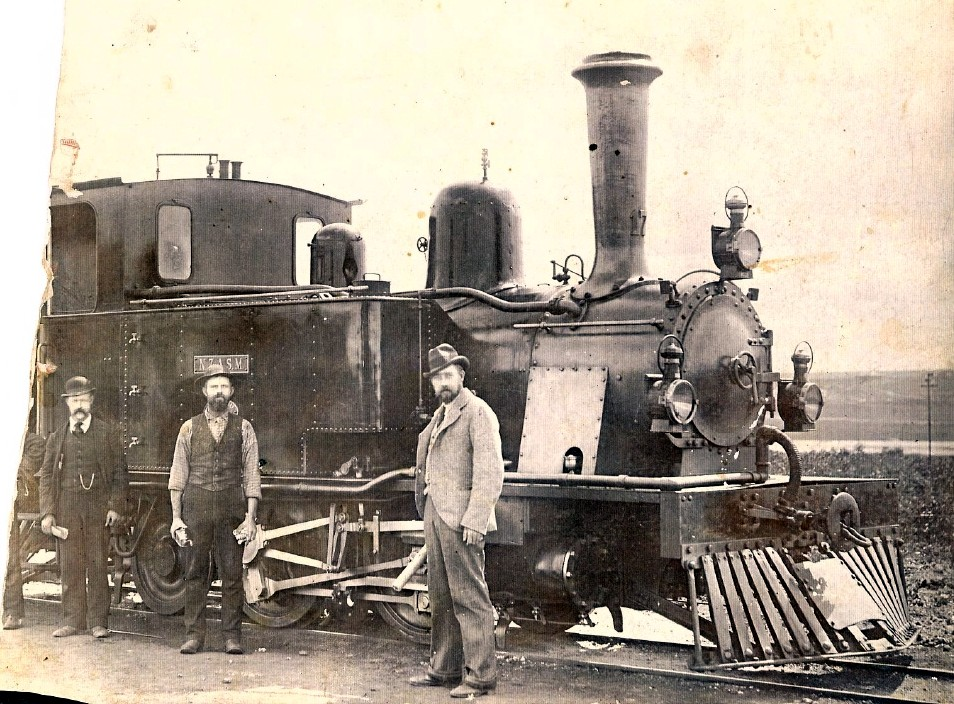
Breda-built no. 17, c. 1895

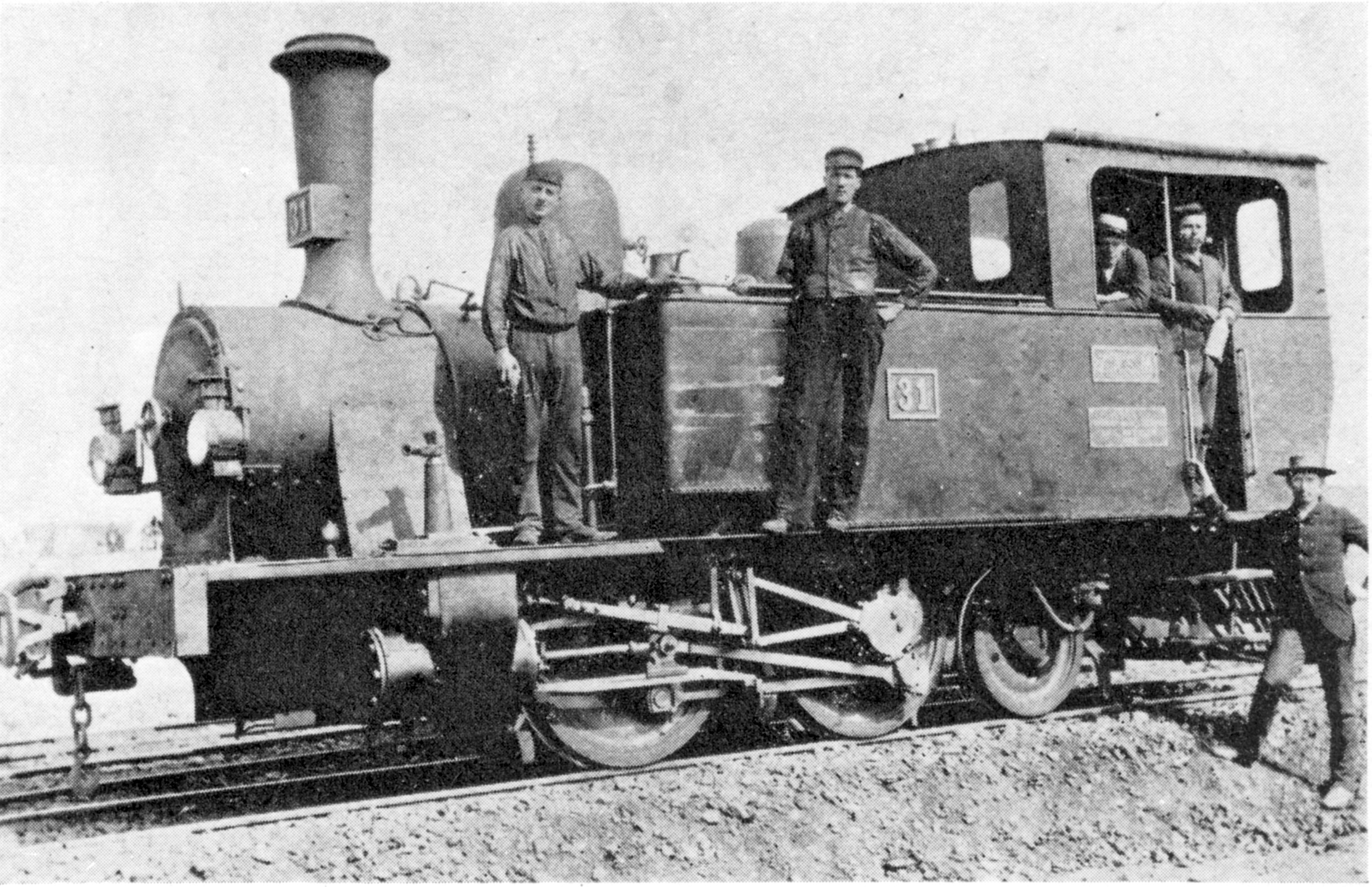
Esslingen-built no. 31, c. 1895

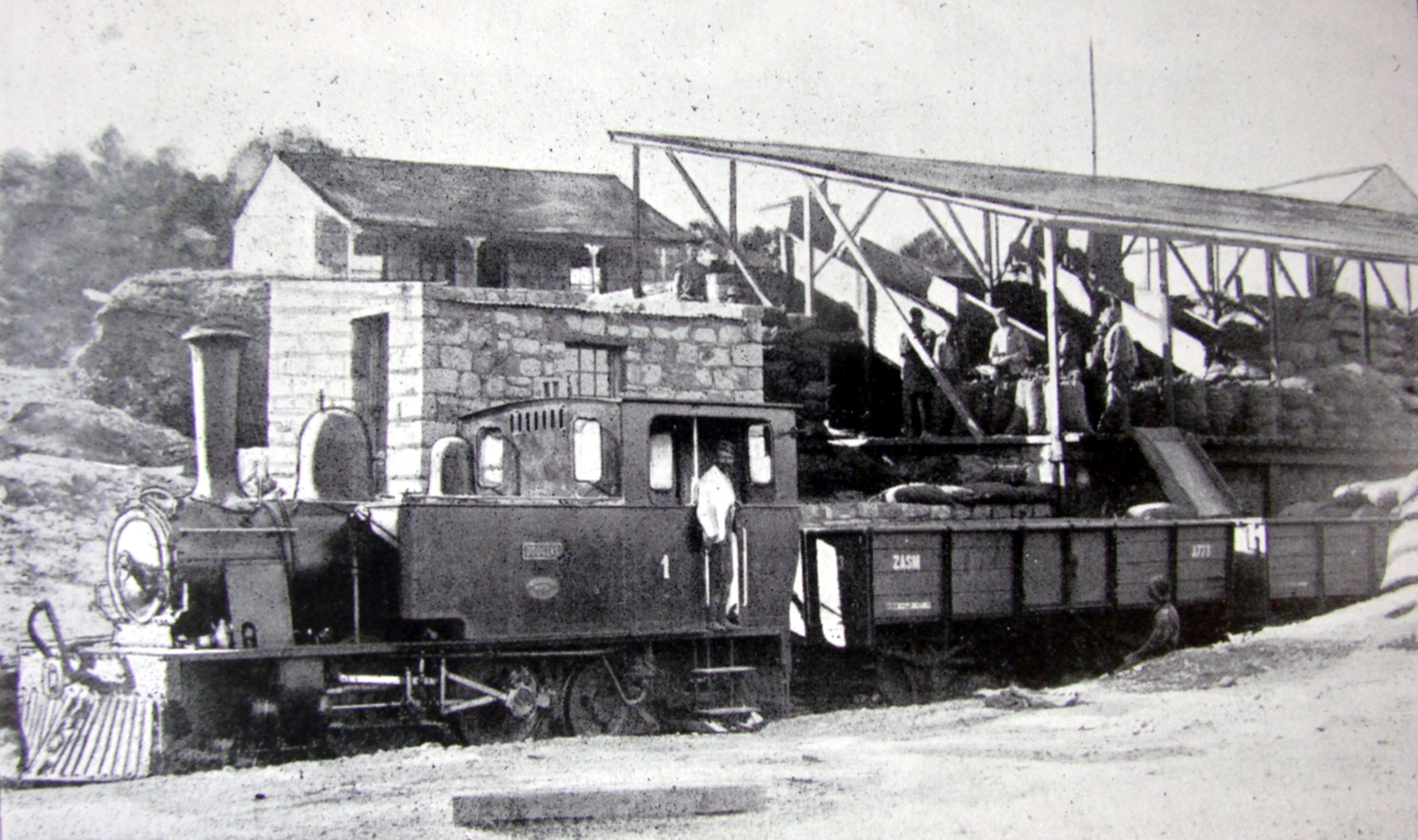
Breda-built Douglas Colliery no. 1, c. 1900
