= CSAR Railmotor =

South African steam railmotor locomotive

CSAR Railmotor South African Railmotor
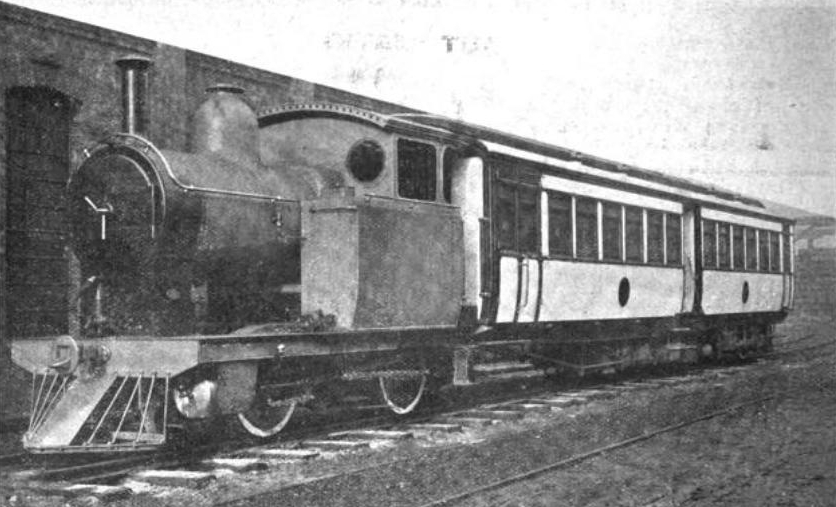
Type and origin
- Power type: Steam
- Designer: Kitson & Co
- Builder: Engine: Kitson & Co; Coach: Metropolitan Amalgamated Railway Carriage & Wagon
- Serial number: 4410
- Build date: 1906
- Total produced: 1
Specifications
- Configuration
  - Whyte: 0-4-0+4 (Four-coupled)
  - AAR: B-2
  - UIC: B'2'n2t
- Driver: 2nd coupled axle
- Gauge: 3 ft 6 in (1,067 mm) Cape gauge
- Coupled dia.: 39 in (991 mm)
- Trailing dia.: 33 1/2 in (851 mm) coach
- Wheelbase: 52 ft 8 1/2 in (16,066 mm)
  - Coupled: 8 ft (2,438 mm)
  - Trailing: 6 ft 5 in (1,956 mm) coach
- Length
  - Over beams: 62 ft 1/2 in (18,910 mm)
- Width: 7 ft 5 in (2,261 mm) running boards 8 ft 7 in (2,616 mm) cab 9 ft 1 3/4 in (2,788 mm) coach 8 ft 4 in (2,540 mm) footsteps
- Height: 11 ft 9 in (3,581 mm) engine 11 ft 10 11/16 in (3,624 mm) coach
- Frame type: Plate
- Axle load: 13 LT 9 cwt (13,670 kg)
  - Coupled: 13 LT 9 cwt (13,670 kg) each
  - Trailing: 10 LT 6 cwt (10,470 kg) coach
- Loco weight: 47 LT 11 cwt (48,310 kg)
- Fuel type: Coal
- Fuel capacity: 1 LT (1.0 t)
- Water cap.: 500 imp gal (2,270 L)
- Firebox
  - Type: Belpaire
  - Grate area: 10.75 sq ft (0.999 m^{2})
- Boiler
  - Pitch: 7 ft (2,134 mm)
  - Diameter: 3 ft 8 in (1,118 mm) outside
  - Tube plates: 6 ft (1,829 mm)
  - Small tubes: 180: 1 5/8 in (41 mm)
- Boiler pressure: 160 psi (1,103 kPa)
- Safety valve: Salter
- Heating surface
  - Firebox: 50.5 sq ft (4.69 m^{2})
  - Tubes: 459.5 sq ft (42.69 m^{2})
  - Total surface: 510 sq ft (47 m^{2})
- Cylinders: Two
- Cylinder size: 11 in (279 mm) bore 16 in (406 mm) stroke
- Valve gear: Walschaerts
- Valve type: Piston
- Couplers: Johnston link-and-pin
Performance figures
- Tractive effort: 6,354 lbf (28.26 kN) @ 75%
Career
- Operators: Central South African Railways; South African Railways
- Class: Railmotor
- Number in class: 1
- Numbers: M2
- Delivered: 1907
- First run: 1907
- Withdrawn: c. 1921

The CSAR Railmotor of 1907 was a South African steam railmotor locomotive from the pre-Union era in Transvaal Colony.

In 1907, the Central South African Railways acquired a single self-contained railmotor for the low-volume railmotor passenger service which had been introduced the previous year. The predecessor vehicle was a railmotor engine which consisted of a single 19 Tonner 0-4-2T locomotive that was modified and semi-permanently coupled to a modified 3rd Class side-door passenger coach. On the new railmotor, the passenger coach was an integral part of the locomotive itself.

== Railmotor service ==
In January 1905 an order was placed by the Central South African Railways (CSAR) with Kitson & Co for two self-contained railmotors. By the end of 1905, it was reported by CSAR Chief Locomotive Superintendent L.S. Smart that a great delay had occurred in the delivery of the two railmotors and that delivery was not expected for months.

To avoid further delay with the implementing of the new railmotor service, it was decided to construct a railmotor engine at the Pretoria Works, consisting of a light 19 Tonner 0-4-2 tank locomotive and a 52-seat side-door 3rd Class suburban coach. The locomotive was modified and semi-permanently coupled to the coach, which was modified to contain a driving cab at the rear end with the controls arranged so that the push-pull unit could be driven from either vehicle. The locomotive was reclassified as a Railmotor Engine and renumbered M1. The CSAR railmotor service was put into operation in April 1906 and operated between Rissik in Johannesburg and Wonderboom in Pretoria.

== Manufacturer ==
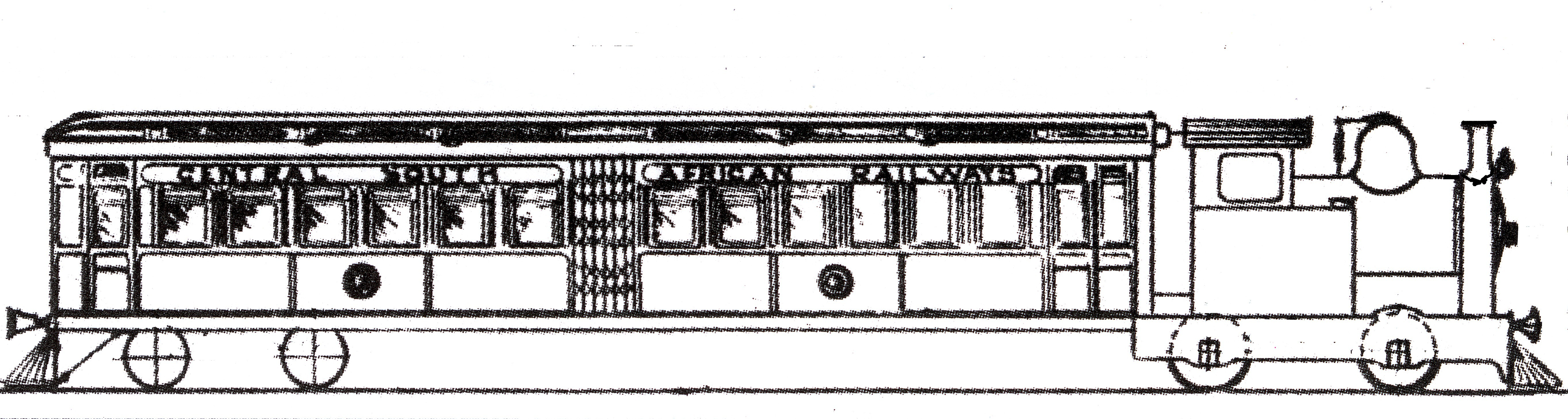
Side view drawing of Railmotor no. M2

Only one new Kitson-built railmotor was eventually delivered in August 1907 and was numbered M2. It was a self-contained motor-coach with a 56-seat capacity in which the engine, boiler and coach were embodied in a single vehicle. While the engine part of the vehicle was built by Kitson, the 46 feet 11 inches (14,300 millimetres) long coach part was constructed by Metropolitan Amalgamated Railway Carriage & Wagon. To negotiate curves and points, the power unit could pivot like a bogie. The railmotor was erected at the Salt River shops of the Cape Government Railways (CGR) in Cape Town and entered service on the CSAR on 10 August 1907.

== Characteristics ==
The engine's cylinders were arranged outside the plate frames and the piston valves, arranged above the cylinders, were actuated by Walschaerts valve gear. The coach was fitted throughout with Stone system electric lights.

== Service ==
=== Central South African Railways ===
Railmotor no. M2 initially worked out of Germiston on the Elsburg-Germiston-Rietfontein Mine route, but the service was extended on 8 September 1907 to include the Germiston-Jupiter section. The route of the home-built railmotor engine no. M1 was also extended, to Hatherley-Rissik-Pretoria-Wonderboom.

In service, the new railmotor no. M2 was found to be less satisfactory than the home-built railmotor engine no. M1, which was considered to be superior in aspects like design, passenger comfort, economy in running and convenience in working. With one end of the railmotor's passenger coach carried on the engine frame, the type of springs necessary for a locomotive caused unsatisfactory riding qualities in the vehicle. Since the imported railmotor was a single vehicle, the carriage was unusable while the engine had to be withdrawn for service or repairs. The Pretoria-built coach, on the other hand, was still readily detachable from the locomotive and both engine and coach were still complete units which could be used independently of each other.

The purchase cost of railmotor no. M2 was £4,654, while the cost to convert the first 19 Tonner and a coach to a railmotor engine had been £5,827. Given the advantages of the home-built vehicle over the imported railmotor and the fact that several 19 Tonner locomotives were standing idle and considered unusable for any other purpose, no more railmotors were ordered and another two 19 Tonners were converted to railmotor engines in 1908, at a cost of £2,485 each. During 1909, orders were placed with the shops for another seven railmotor engines. These nine vehicles were renumbered in the range from M3 to M11.

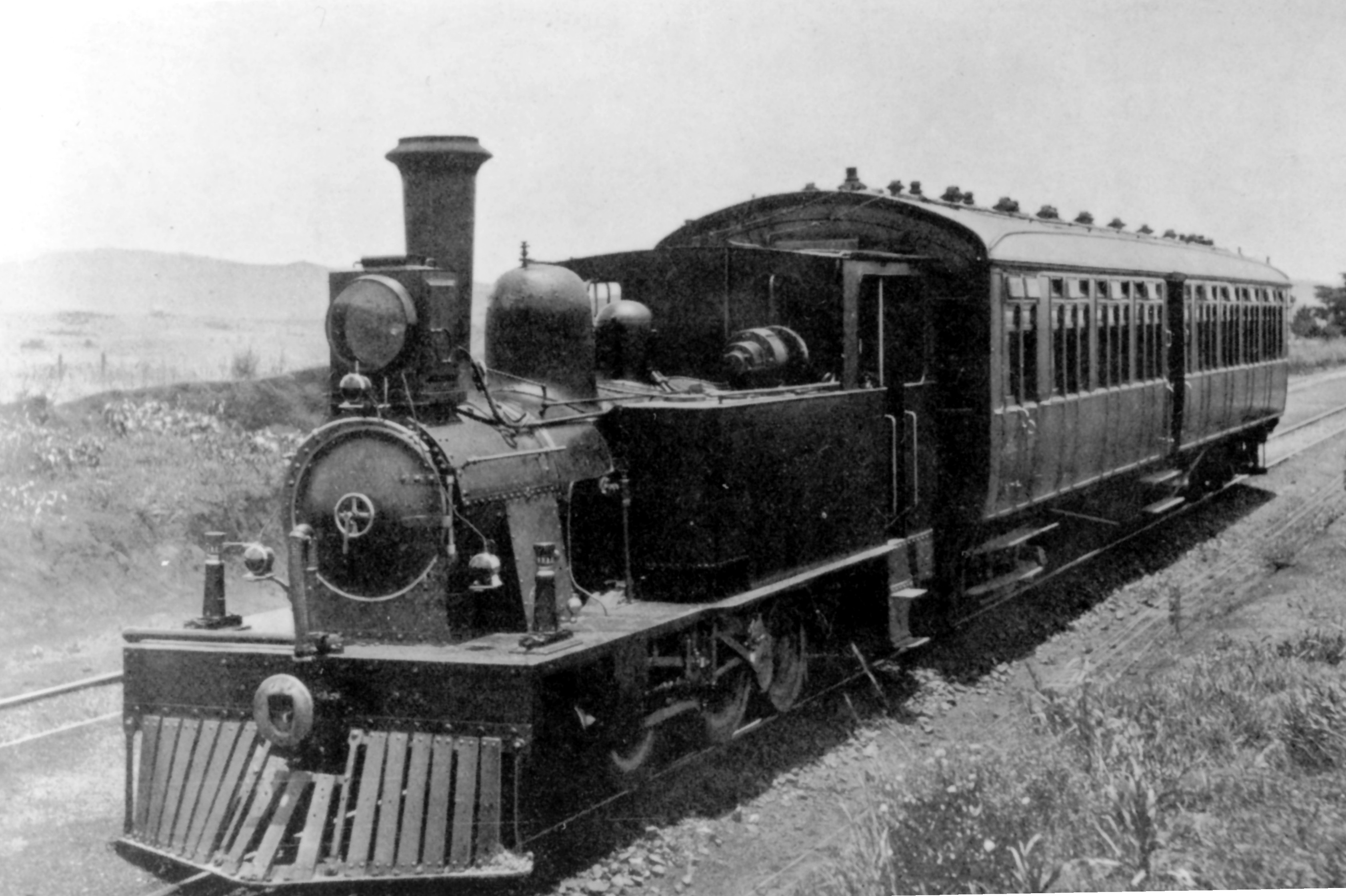
19 Tonner Railmotor Engine no. M1

Between 1906 and 1909, steam railmotor services were expanded to operate on four routes:

- Hatherley-Pretoria-Wonderboom.
- Elsburg-Germiston-Rietfontein Mine.
- Luipaardsvlei-Krugersdorp-Randfontein.
- Germiston-Geduld.

=== South African Railways ===
When the Union of South Africa was established on 31 May 1910, the three Colonial government railways (Cape Government Railways, Natal Government Railways and CSAR) were united under a single administration to control and administer the railways, ports and harbours of the Union. Although the South African Railways and Harbours came into existence in 1910, the actual classification and renumbering of all the rolling stock of the three constituent railways were only implemented with effect from 1 January 1912.

In 1912, the railmotor, along with the ten railmotor engines, were taken onto the SAR roster as unclassified locomotives since they were considered obsolete. Since they were excluded from the SAR renumbering schedules, they retained their CSAR engine numbers.

At some stage, the railmotor's boiler was allocated SAR boiler no. 4001. The railmotor was withdrawn from service by 1921.
