= Cape Town Railway & Dock 0-4-0T =

First locomotive in South Africa

Cape Town Railway & Dock 0-4-0T CGR 0-4-2T no. 9 Blackie
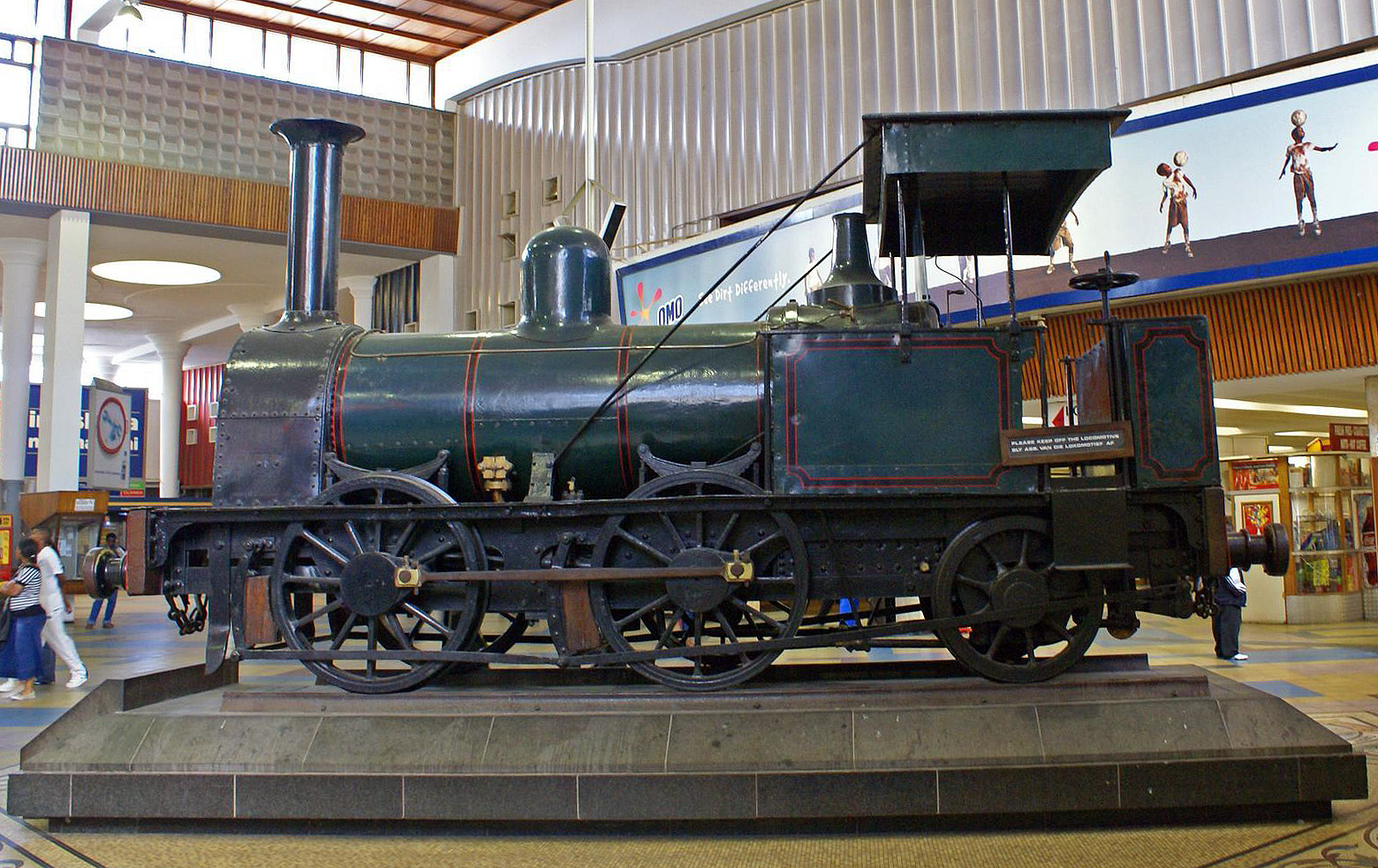
- The engine Blackie plinthed at Cape Town station, 16 February 2007
Type and origin
- Power type: Steam
- Designer: Hawthorns and Company, Leith
- Builder: Hawthorns and Company, Leith
- Serial number: 162
- Build date: 1859
- Total produced: 1
- Rebuilder: Cape Government Railways
- Rebuild date: c. 1873
Specifications
- Configuration
  - Whyte: 0-4-0T as built 0-4-2T rebuilt
  - UIC: Bn2t as built B1n2t rebuilt
- Gauge: 4 ft 8 1/2 in (1,435 mm) standard gauge
- Coupled dia.: 54 in (1,372 mm)
- Trailing dia.: 36 in (914 mm)
- Wheelbase: 11 ft 10 in (3,607 mm)
  - Coupled: 6 ft (1,829 mm)
- Length
  - Over beams: 20 ft 2 in (6,147 mm)
- Width: 6 ft 3 in (1,905 mm) engine 8 ft 5 in (2,565 mm) cab roof
- Height: 11 ft 8 in (3,556 mm)
- Frame type: Plate
- Loco weight: 14 LT (14,220 kg)
- Fuel type: Coal
- Firebox
  - Type: Round-top
- Boiler
  - Pitch: 5 ft 1 in (1,549 mm)
  - Diameter: 3 ft 8 1/2 in (1,130 mm) outside
- Boiler pressure: 120 psi (827 kPa)
- Cylinders: Two
- Cylinder size: 10 in (254 mm) bore 18 in (457 mm) stroke
- Valve gear: Stephenson
- Couplers: Buffers and chain
Career
- Operators: Messrs E. & J. Pickering; Cape Town Railway & Dock; Cape Government Railways; Kowie Harbour Improvement Co.
- Number in class: 1
- Numbers: 9
- Official name: Frontier
- Nicknames: Blackie
- Delivered: 1859
- First run: 1859
- Withdrawn: 1883
- Preserved: 1
- Disposition: Heritage object, plinthed

The Cape Town Railway & Dock 0-4-0T of 1859 was a South African steam locomotive from the pre-Union era in the Cape of Good Hope,and the first locomotive to arrive in South Africa.

In September 1859, Messrs. E. & J. Pickering, contractors to the Cape Town Railway and Dock Company for the construction of the Cape Town-Wellington railway line, imported a small 0-4-0 side-tank steam locomotive from England, for use during the construction of the railway. This locomotive, later to become engine no. 9 of the Cape Town Railway and Dock Company and then of the Cape Government Railways, was the first locomotive in South Africa. It has been declared a heritage object and was plinthed in the main concourse of Cape Town station.

Possibly in early 1874, by then on the roster of the Cape Government Railways, this locomotive was rebuilt to a 0-4-2T configuration, before it was shipped to Port Alfred where it served as harbour construction locomotive on the banks of the Kowie River. While serving at Port Alfred, it was nicknamed Blackie.

== Manufacturer ==
After having made representations to the Cape Colonial Government in 1853 and 1855, the Cape Town Railway and Dock Company was granted approval, by Act no. 10 of 29 June 1857, to construct a 57 miles (92 kilometres) long railway between Cape Town and Wellington. The company appointed Messrs. E. & J. Pickering as contractors for the construction of the railway.

Pickerings ordered a locomotive from Scotland for use as construction engine. The locomotive was built in 1857 by Hawthorns and Company, Leith, and bore works number 162. It was a 0-4-0T locomotive and was built to run on 4 ft 8 1/2 in (1,435 mm) gauge. The locomotive arrived in Cape Town on 8 September 1859 and has the distinction of being the first locomotive in South Africa.

== Service ==
=== Messrs. E. & J. Pickering ===
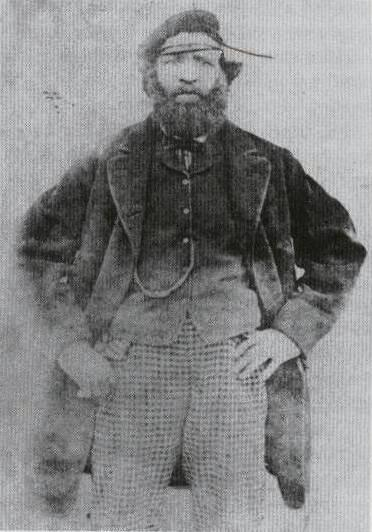
William Dabbs

Upon arrival in Cape Town, the locomotive had to be dismantled before it could be landed off the brig Charles by means of lighters. The locomotive was accompanied by its engineer-driver, a Scot named William Dabbs. It was partially re-assembled on the jetty and then moved to Alfred's Square, now part of the Parade in Cape Town. There, a galvanised iron shed was built over it and the re-assembly was completed by Dabbs.

The locomotive's two cylinders were inside the frame and it was equipped with Stephenson valve gear. Its two feedwater pumps were actuated by the piston crossheads. As built, the engine had an open cab, but a cab roof was installed some years later.

According to one source, the contractor imported another two locomotives of the same design from the same manufacturer. While it is possible, it is deemed unlikely, since such additional locomotives are not reflected in the subsequent locomotive numbering lists of either the Cape Town Railway and Dock Company or the Cape Government Railways.

=== Cape Town Railway and Dock ===
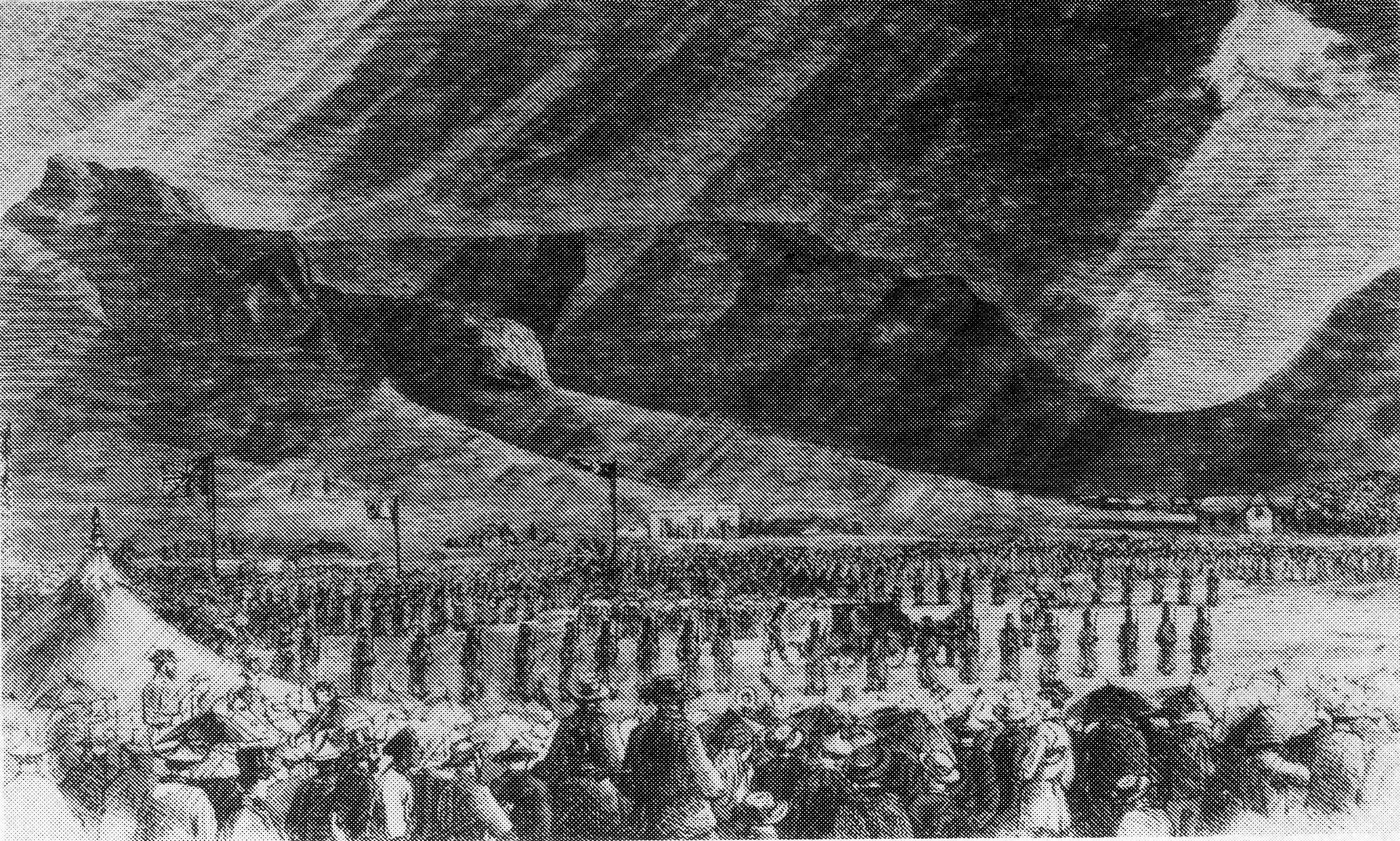
Turning the first sod, in the rain

The first sod for the Cape Town-Wellington railway had been turned on 31 March 1859 by the Governor of the Cape of Good Hope, Sir George Grey, using a silver shovel specially made for the opening ceremony. However, the first section of track between Fort De Knokke and Salt River was only opened on 8 February 1861. In anticipation of the completion of the line, the Cape Town Railway and Dock took delivery of eight 0-4-2 tender locomotives from R and W Hawthorn in Newcastle upon Tyne in England. These locomotives arrived in two shipments on 20 March and 28 April 1860. They were given names and were numbered from 1 to 8. Since the full complement of engines arrived before the lines were laid, they were erected and placed on display for the public, while awaiting the completion of sufficient line to be useful.

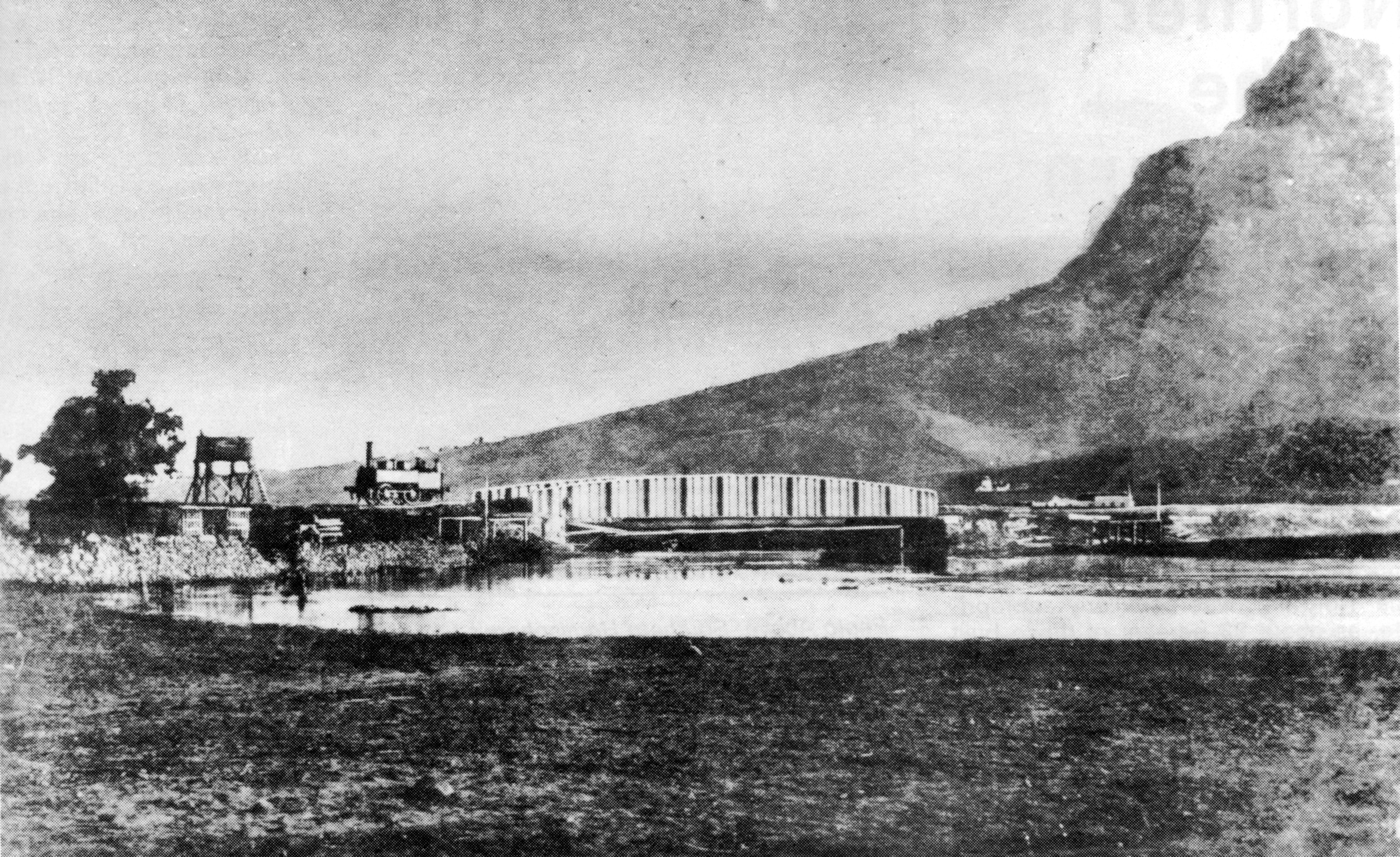
The engine Blackie as 0-4-0T, running across the Salt River, c. September 1861

The slow construction rate of 1 1/2 miles (2.4 kilometres) of track in 23 months, led to strained relations between the railway company and the contractors. The dispute ended in sabotage when disgruntled contractor employees ran one of Cape Town Railway and Dock's new tender locomotives, no. 4 Wellington, into a culvert, with the result that it had to be sent to the newly established workshops at Salt River to have some serious damage repaired. In October 1861, Cape Town Railway and Dock dismissed the contractors and took over all construction work, as well as the Pickering locomotive. The engine was therefore given the number 9, in spite of having been the first locomotive in South Africa.

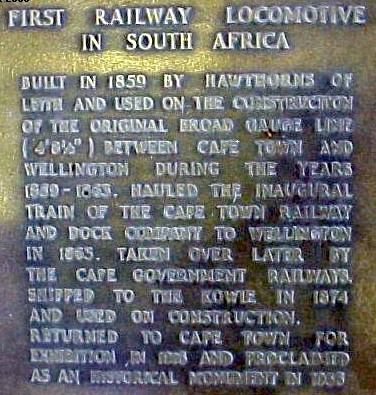
Plaque on the engine Blackie's plinth

The line from Cape Town to Wellington took nearly five years to complete. The line to Eersterivier was officially opened on 13 February 1862. Stellenbosch was reached on 1 May 1862 and the railhead at Wellington on 4 November 1863. Work was completed about a year later, and according to the plaque mounted on its plinth at Cape Town station, engine no. 9 had the honour to haul the official inaugural train of the Cape Town-Wellington railway to Wellington in 1865.

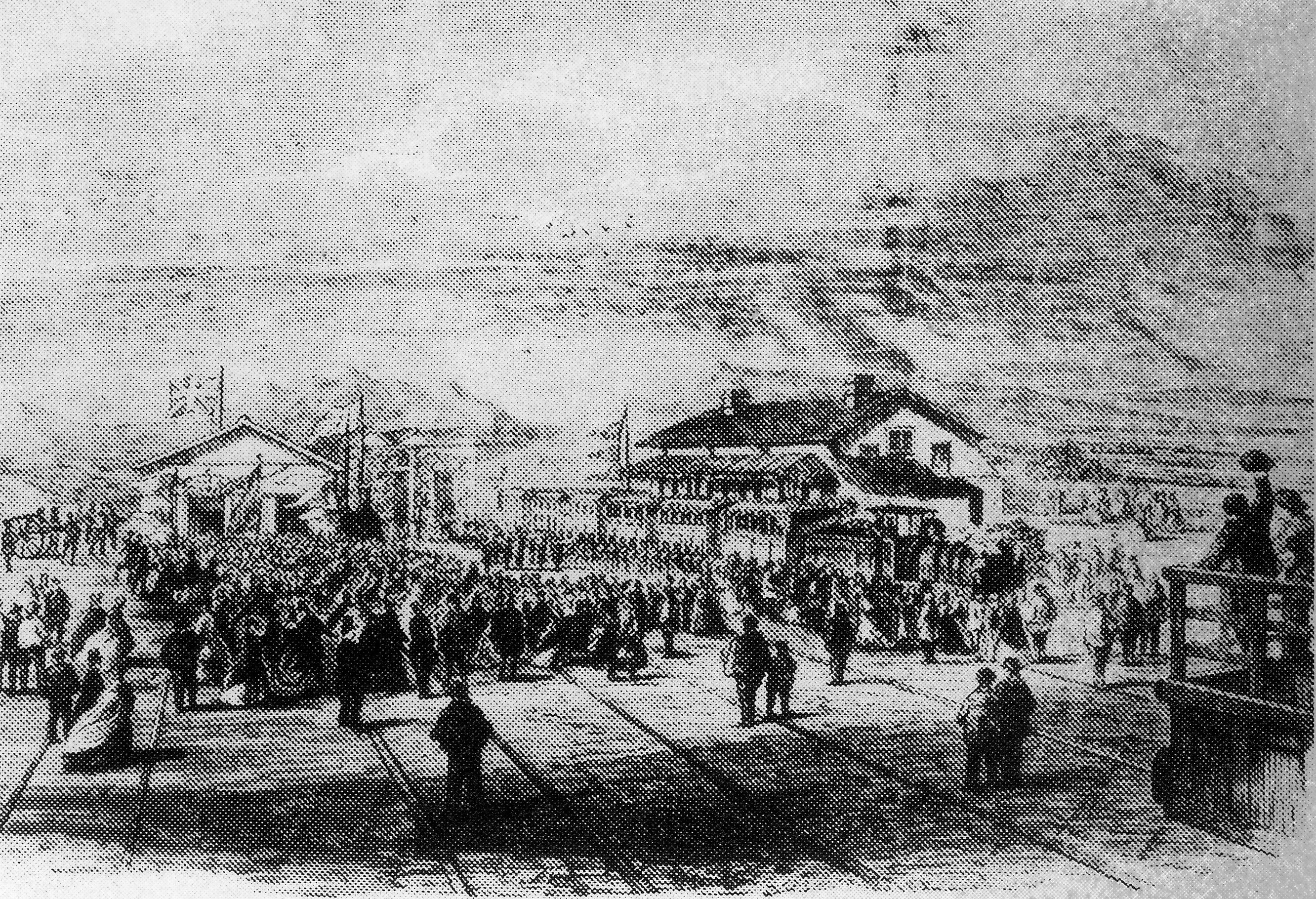
Arrival of the inaugural train at Wellington Station, behind a tender locomotive

The inscription on the plaque, however, is untrue. An engraving, depicting the arrival of the inaugural train at Wellington Station, shows the train behind one of the eight 0-4-2 tender locomotives.

One of these tender engines had hauled the first train from Cape Town to Eersterivier on 13 February 1862 and also the official train during the opening ceremony at Wellington. As construction locomotive, engine no. 9 may well have been at the head of the first construction train to reach the railhead at Wellington, but whether this was so, is not known.

=== Cape Government Railways ===
In 1872, the Cape Government of Prime Minister John Molteno decided to take over the operation of all railways in the Colony. The Cape Town-Wellington and Salt River-Wynberg lines were therefore amalgamated into the Cape Government Railways (CGR).

Engine no. 9 remained in service in Cape Town until late in 1873. In October 1873, the Chief Inspector of Public Works requested a locomotive for use at the Kowie harbour project in Port Alfred and, on 24 December, authority was granted for alterations to be made to the locomotive and for it to be shipped to Port Alfred. It is probable that these alterations included the addition of a trailing axle.

This is borne out by observations by the late Dusty Durrant, who observed that the trailing wheels on the locomotive were cast and of a more modern design than the coupled wheels, which appear to be of wrought iron. He also surmised that, since there is no evidence of a well-tank under the bunker, the locomotive had been a side-tank locomotive throughout its working life and that the side-tanks were, in all probability, removed at some stage after the engine was abandoned as unserviceable in 1883.

=== Kowie Harbour Improvement ===
On 4 July 1874, the rebuilt engine no. 9 was shipped to the Kowie, to be used in harbour construction at the Kowie Harbour at Port Alfred, which was being undertaken by the Kowie Harbour Improvement Company. It left Cape Town on board the ship Compage and arrived at Port Alfred on 11 July.

At Port Alfred, engine no. 9 was officially named Frontier. Since it was painted black at the time, it came to be affectionately known as Blackie. It was reassembled and put to work on the west bank of the Kowie River, but it derailed upon reaching the first curve on the existing rails, which had been laid for ox-drawn wagons and were not fishplated together. It was found that the curves were too sharp for the locomotive and, during the repairs, the flanges on the second pair of coupled wheels were removed. The engine Blackie was also restricted to a 2 miles per hour (3.2 kilometres per hour) speed limit.

As pressure of work demanded, it became necessary to regularly ferry the locomotive from one bank of the Kowie to the other, until a second locomotive was obtained in 1877, an 0-4-0 saddle-tank engine named Aid. The engine Blackie worked on the Kowie project until 1883, by which time it was completely unserviceable and was abandoned on a siding.

== Preservation ==
In December 1897, a big South African Exhibition took place at Grahamstown. The engine Blackie was repaired, repainted and railed to that town to be placed on show, albeit without side-tanks. When the exhibition drew to a close at the end of January 1898, the locomotive was placed in storage in Grahamstown. It remained there until the newly established South African Railways decided, in 1913, that it should be placed on permanent exhibition at Cape Town Station. The engine was repainted in the green Cape Government Railways livery, railed to Cape Town and plinthed on the old Cape Town station's concourse, at the ends of Platforms 3 and 4.

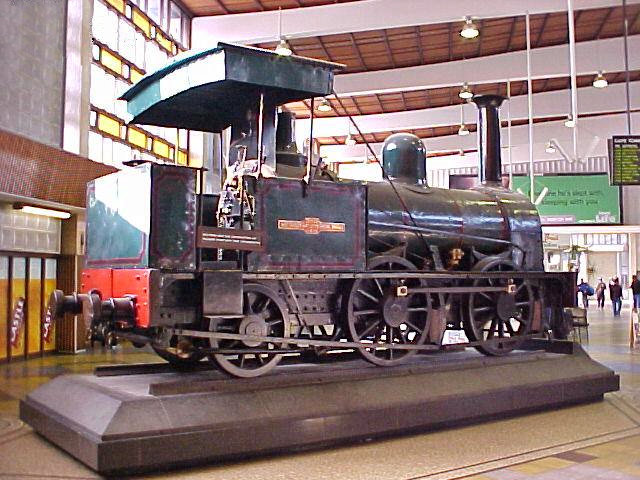
The engine Blackie, 24 August 2003

While the Cape's suburban lines were being electrified between 1927 and 1928, the engine Blackie was found to be in the way of some masts which had to be erected for the overhead equipment. It was trucked off to Salt River by the engineer in charge, with instructions that it be scrapped. However, the old locomotive's historical value was recognised by A.W. Westley, Salt River's mechanical engineer in charge, who had it plinthed just inside the entrance to the works. It remained there until it was eventually examined by the Historical Monuments Commission, which had it returned to Cape Town station. On 14 April 1936, it was proclaimed a national monument by Government Notice No. 529.

When the new Cape Town station was completed in the 1960s, the engine Blackie was plinthed in the main concourse.
