= 1853 in South Africa =

- Decades: 1830s; 1840s; 1850s; 1860s; 1870s
- See also: List of years in South Africa

The following lists events that happened during 1853 in South Africa.

== Events ==
- The 8th Cape Frontier War ends
- The settlement of Hopetown is established
- Nicholaas Waterboer, eldest son of Andries Waterboer succeeds as Griqua captain
- The settlement of Queenstown is established
- The settlement of Seymour is established
- The Union Steamship Line is founded
- the right to vote is granted to every property-owning male (including Africans) in the Cape Province. This right was abolished with the introduction of Apartheid in 1948

== Births ==
- 20 August - Jan Ernst Abraham Volschenk, landscape painter, is born near Riversdale, Cape Colony

== Deaths ==
- 23 July - Andries Pretorius (54), Voortrekker leader
