= 1857 in South Africa =

- Decades: 1830s; 1840s; 1850s; 1860s; 1870s
- See also: List of years in South Africa

The following lists events that happened during 1857 in South Africa.

== Incumbents ==
- Governor of the Cape of Good Hope and High Commissioner for Southern Africa: Sir George Grey.
- Lieutenant-governor of the Colony of Natal: John Scott.
- State President of the Orange Free State: Jacobus Nicolaas Boshoff.
- President of the Executive Council of the South African Republic: Marthinus Wessel Pretorius (from 6 January).

== Events ==
January

- 6 – Marthinus Wessel Pretorius becomes the first President of the Executive Council of the South African Republic (Zuid Afrikaansche Republiek).

June

- 29 – Act no. 10 of 29 June 1857 grants the Cape Town Railway and Dock Company approval to construct a 57-mile-long (92-kilometre) railway between Cape Town and Wellington.

Unknown date

- Robert Moffat completes Old Testament Bible translation into Setswana.
- About 157 Irish women arrive on the ship Lady Kennaway and settle in British Kaffraria.
- The first Legislative Council is selected in the Natal Colony.
- The Union Steam Ship Company wins the first mail contract for regular mail service between Great Britain and South Africa.
- The Cape Point Lighthouse at Cape Point is built.
- Building of the Roman Rock Lighthouse at the entrance to Simon's Town starts and only completed in 1861.

== Births ==
- 2 October – Martinus Theunis Steyn, lawyer, politician and statesman, last president of the independent Orange Free State. (d. 1916)

== Deaths ==
- 15 December – Anna Maria Truter, Cape Colony botanical artist and wife of Sir John Barrow, 1st Baronet. (b. 1777)
