= John Philip (missionary) =

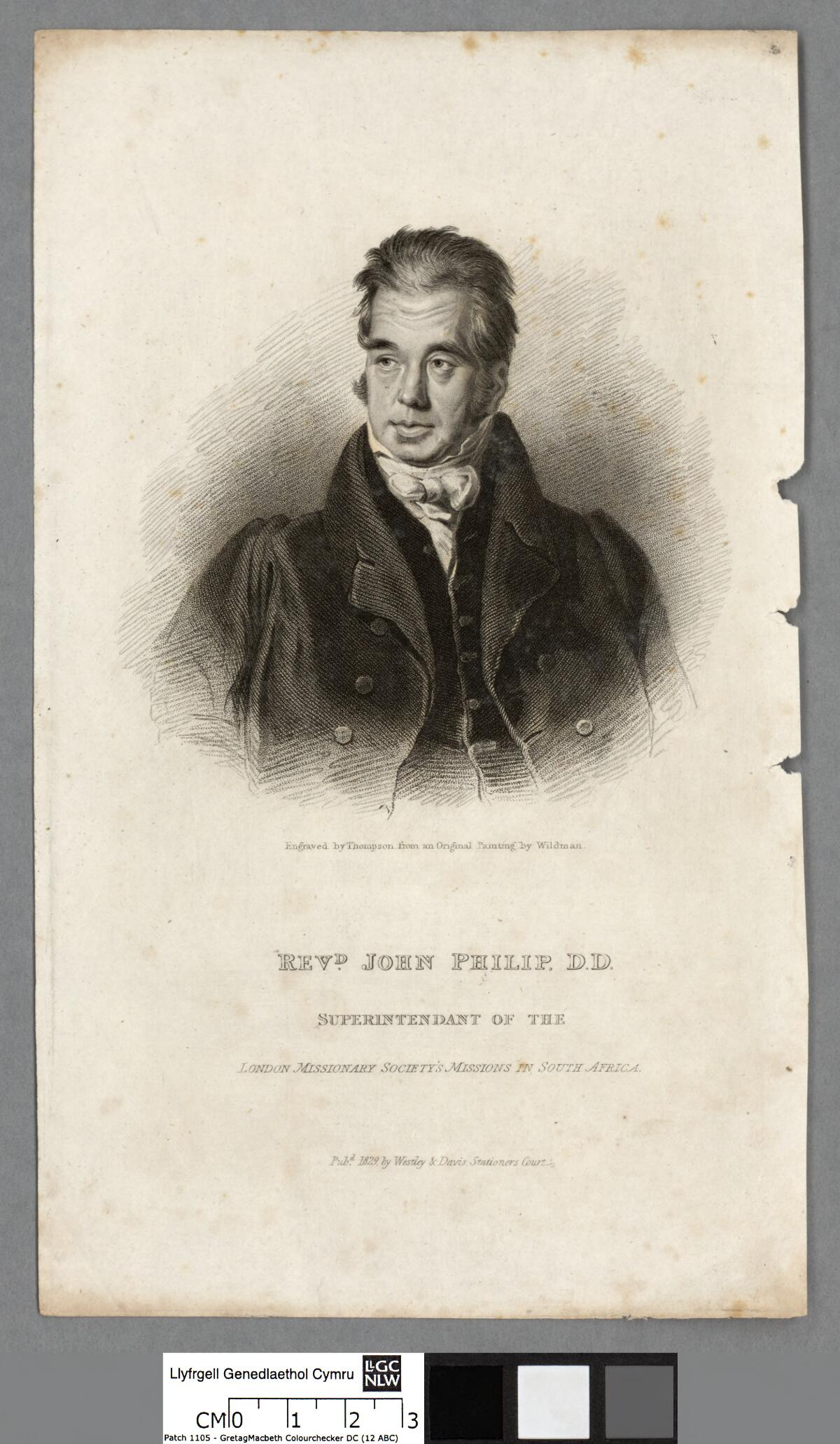
- Portrait of Revd. John Philip D.D
- Born: 14 April 1775; Kirkcaldy, Fife, Scotland
- Died: 27 August 1851 (aged 76); Hankey, Cape Colony
- Resting place: Hankey, Cape Colony
- Occupation: missionary
- Spouse: Jane Ross

John Philip (14 April 1775 – 27 August 1851), was a missionary in South Africa. Philip was born at Kirkcaldy, Fife, Scotland to a local schoolmaster. After starting as an apprentice to a linen draper in Leven, and working as a clerk in Dundee, he entered the Wesleyan theological college at Hoxton, and in 1804 was appointed minister of the first Scottish Congregational chapel in Aberdeen. On 24 September 1809 he married Jane Ross, the daughter of a prosperous Aberdeen engineer; they had seven children. His daughter, Elizabeth (Eliza), married John Fairbairn, the renowned educator, politician and financier, on 24 May 1831.

== South Africa ==
In 1818 Philip joined the delegation headed by John Campbell to investigate the threatened closure of London Missionary Society's stations in South Africa and reported that the conduct of the Cape Colonists towards the indigenous people was deserving of strong reprobation. In 1822 Philip was appointed superintendent of the London Missionary Society's stations in South Africa. It was the period of the agitation for the abolition of slavery in England, where Philip's charges against the colonists and the colonial government found powerful support. In 1823 he went back to England to lobby for the indigenous and coloured people's civil rights. His recommendations were adopted by the House of Commons, but his unpopularity in South Africa grew. The British government, however, forced the Cape government to conform to the views of Philip and the ordinance of 1828 was passed granting all free coloured persons at the Cape every right to which any other British subjects were entitled. The French Capetonian actor, polyglot and playwright Charles Etienne Boniface however produced a play in Dutch against Philip: "De nieuwe ridderorde of De Temperantisten". It was printed in 1832 (repr. 1954).

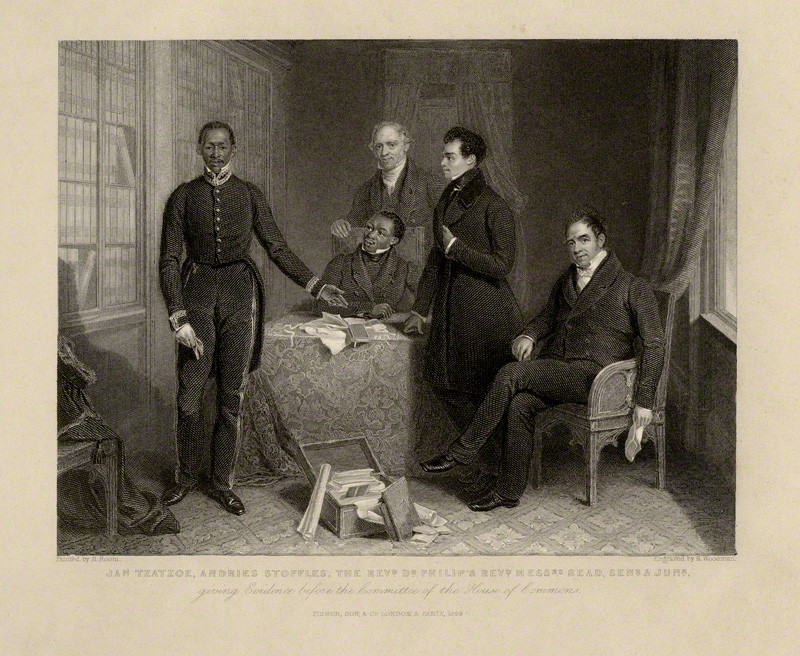
Engraving (1844) of the 1836 Parliamentary delegation from South Africa, led by John Philip, by Richard Woodman after Henry Room

In 1834, Sir Benjamin d'Urban became governor and was anxious to promote the interests of the indigenous people. After the annexing of land north of the Great Kei River, Philip returned to England, in 1836, in the company of two converted Christians, Andries Stoffels, a Coloured South African, and Jan or Dyani Tzatoe (Tshatshu) a Xhosa, and James Read Sr and James Read Jr, both missionaries, who gave evidence before a parliamentary committee and aroused public opinion against the Cape government. D'Urban was dismissed by Charles Grant, 1st Baron Glenelg, the colonial secretary on the 1 May 1837. Philip returned to the Cape as unofficial adviser to the government on all matters affecting the indigenous people of Southern Africa. His wife, Jane, died in 1847.

In 1849 Philip severed his connection with politics after the annexation of the Griqua lands and retired to the mission station at Hankey, Cape Colony, where he died in 1851. His grave is situated behind the old "Philip Manse" in Hankey beside the railway line and is maintained by the Congregational Church. Philip's son, William, and nephew John Philip Fairbairn, born 1834, drowned in the Gamtoos River on 1 July 1845 when their small boat overturned.

The town of Philippolis in the Free State province is named after John Philip. The Transgariep Museum, in the town, has a section devoted to John Philip.
