= Moraea ciliata =

Scientific classification
- Kingdom: Plantae
- Clade: Tracheophytes
- Clade: Angiosperms
- Clade: Monocots
- Order: Asparagales
- Family: Iridaceae
- Genus: Moraea
- Species: M. ciliata

Binomial name
- Moraea ciliata (L.f.) Ker Gawl., (1804)

Synonyms
- Iris ciliata L.f.; Vieusseuxia ciliata (L.f.) Eckl.

Species of flowering plant

Moraea ciliata, commonly known as the fringe tulp or growweuintjie, is a plant and geophyte belonging to the genus Moraea; it is part of the fynbos and Succulent Karoo biomes. The species is endemic to the Northern Cape, Eastern Cape, and Western Cape, occurring from Namaqualand to Riversdale and the southern Karoo. The plant grows to a height of 5–20 cm and blooms from July to September; the flowers are yellow or blue.
