= 1859 in South Africa =

- Decades: 1830s; 1840s; 1850s; 1860s; 1870s
- See also: List of years in South Africa

The following lists events that happened during 1859 in South Africa.

== Incumbents ==
- Governor of the Cape of Good Hope and High Commissioner for Southern Africa: Sir George Grey.
- Lieutenant-governor of the Colony of Natal: John Scott.
- State President of the Orange Free State:
  - Jacobus Nicolaas Boshoff (until 5 September).
  - Esaias Reynier Snijman (acting from 6 September).
- President of the Executive Council of the South African Republic: Marthinus Wessel Pretorius.

== Events ==
=== September ===
- 6 – Esaias Reynier Snijman becomes the acting State President of the Orange Free State.
- 8 – The first railway locomotive in South Africa is brought ashore in Cape Town.

== Births ==
- 11 January – John Tengo Jabavu, political activist and newspaper editor. (d. 1921)
- 1 May – Willem Johannes Leyds, attorney-general of the South African Republic. (d. 1940)

== Deaths ==
=== May ===
- 31 May – Henry Clifford de Meillon, painter (born c. 1800)

== Railways ==
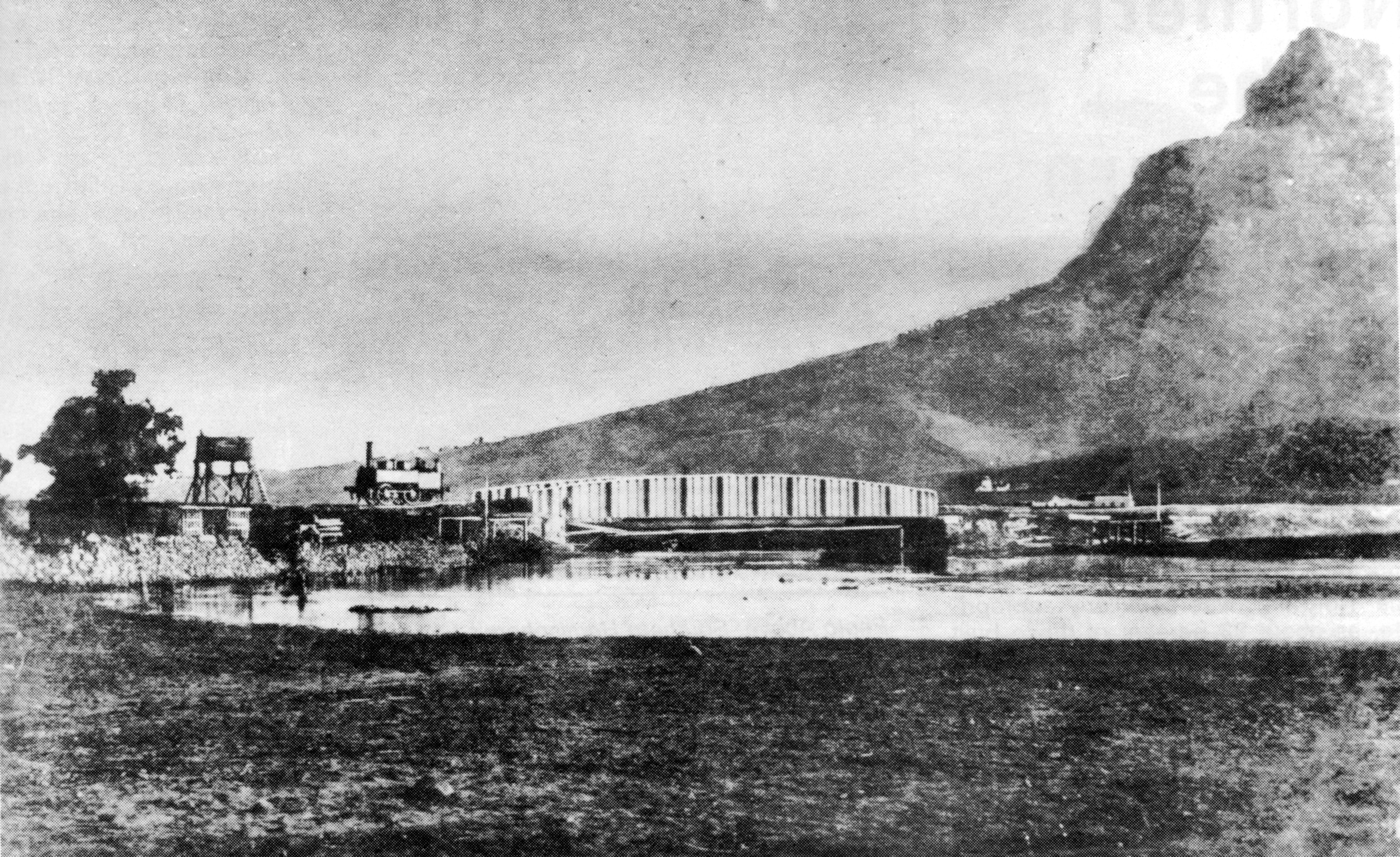
Cape Town Railway & Dock 0-4-0T

=== Railway lines ===
- Construction begins on the Cape Town-Wellington Railway.

=== Locomotives ===
- 8 September – A small 0-4-0 tank steam locomotive is landed in Cape Town, to be used during construction of the first railway in South Africa.
