= Disa subtenuicornis =

Scientific classification
- Kingdom: Plantae
- Clade: Tracheophytes
- Clade: Angiosperms
- Clade: Monocots
- Order: Asparagales
- Family: Orchidaceae
- Subfamily: Orchidoideae
- Genus: Disa
- Species: D. subtenuicornis

Binomial name
- Disa subtenuicornis H.P.Linder

Species of flowering plant

Disa subtenuicornis is a perennial plant and geophyte belonging to the genus Disa and is part of the fynbos. The plant is endemic to the Western Cape and occurs in the Langeberg near Riversdale in moist, swampy soil at altitudes of 1200 - 1500m. The plant is considered rare.
