= Erica physantha =

Scientific classification
- Kingdom: Plantae
- Clade: Tracheophytes
- Clade: Angiosperms
- Clade: Eudicots
- Clade: Asterids
- Order: Ericales
- Family: Ericaceae
- Genus: Erica
- Species: E. physantha

Binomial name
- Erica physantha Benth.

Synonyms
- Ericoides physanthum (Benth.) Kuntze

Species of flowering plant

Erica physantha is a plant belonging to the genus Erica and is part of the fynbos. The species is endemic to the Western Cape and occurs near Platkop at Riversdale. Here there is one population of 0.01 km^{2}, in the road servitude. The habitat is threatened by invasive plants, cutting of bushes, overgrazing and erosion.
