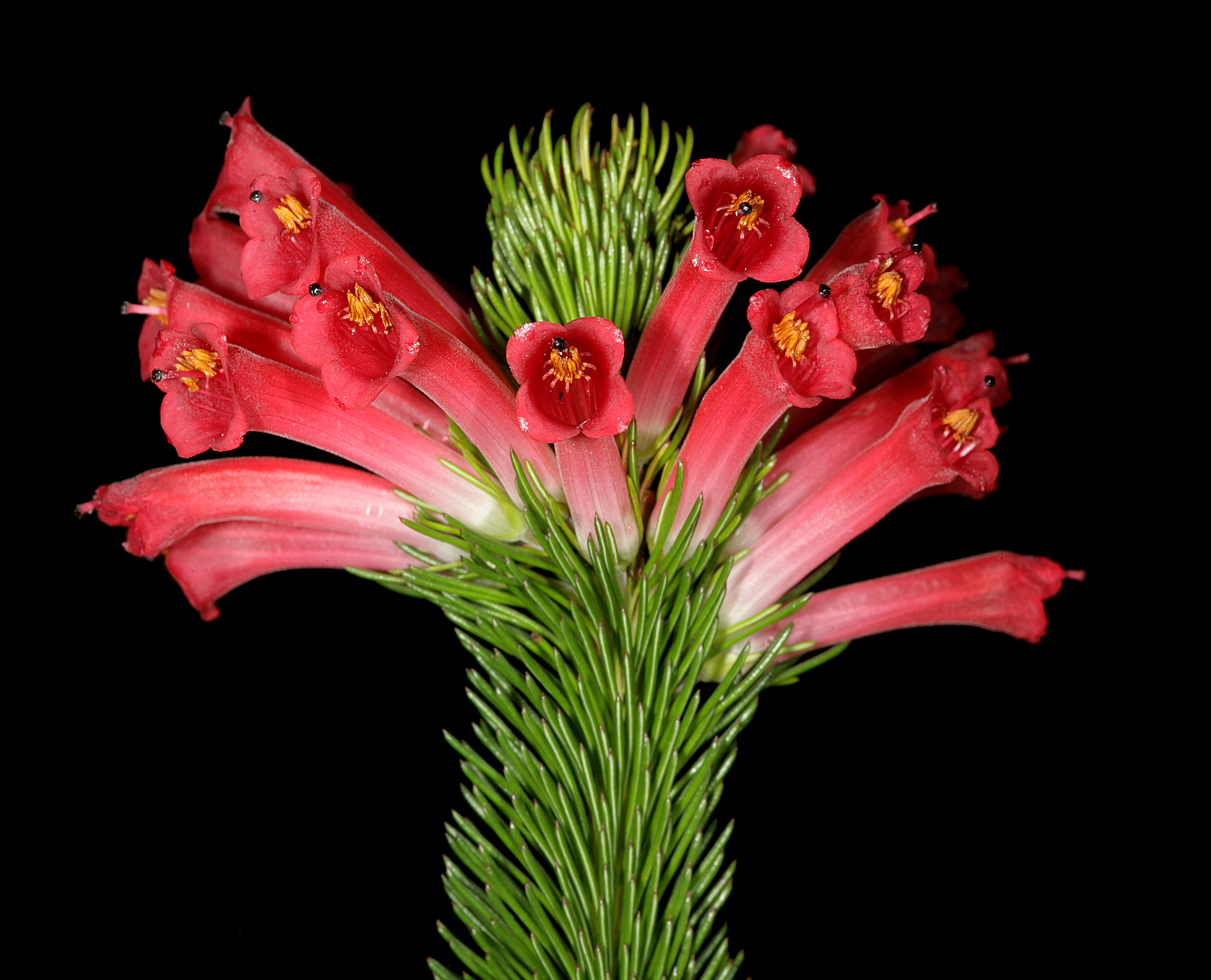

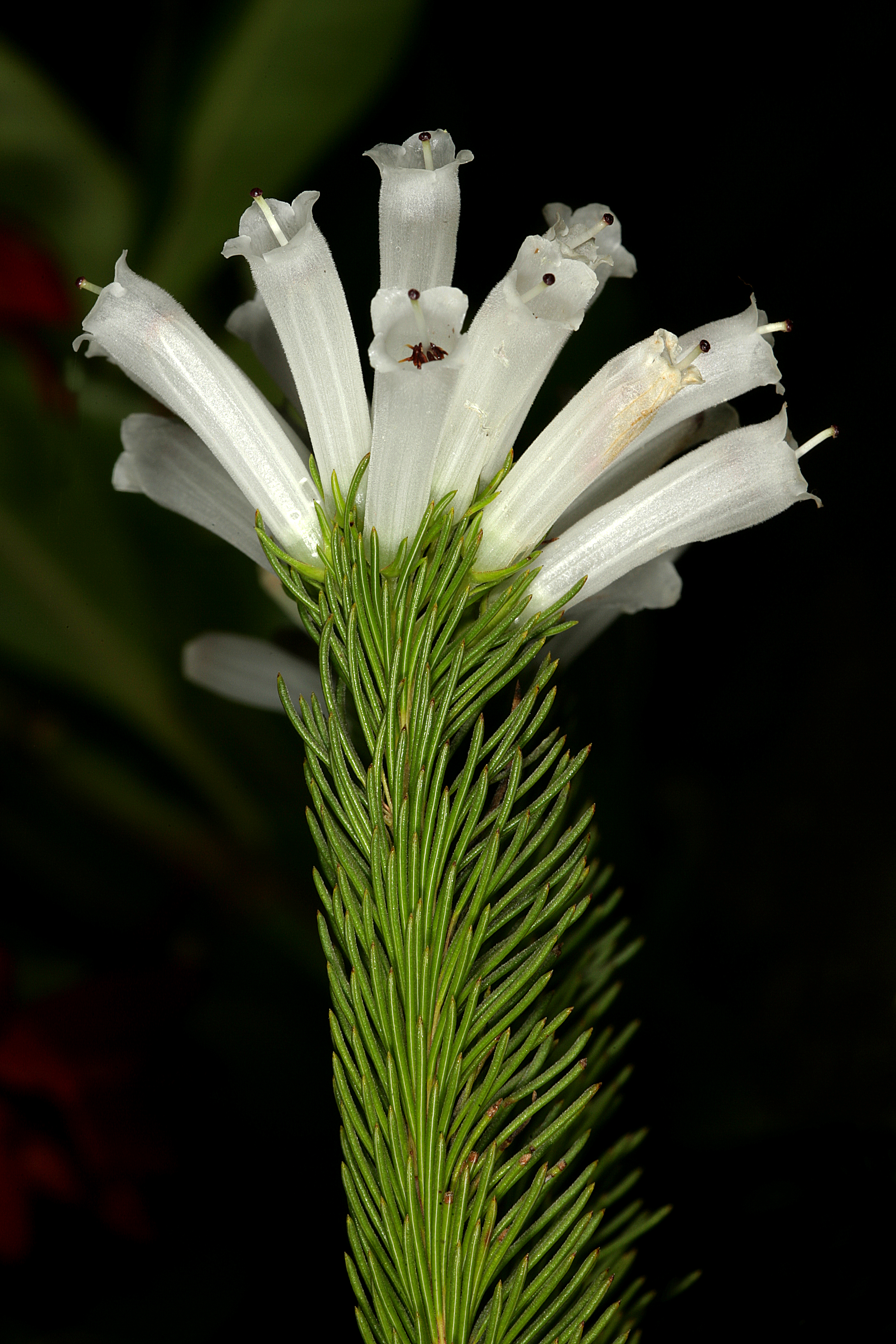

Scientific classification
- Kingdom: Plantae
- Clade: Tracheophytes
- Clade: Angiosperms
- Clade: Eudicots
- Clade: Asterids
- Order: Ericales
- Family: Ericaceae
- Genus: Erica
- Species: E. vestita

Binomial name
- Erica vestita Thunb.

Synonyms
- Erica ekloniana Tausch; Erica mera Klotzsch; Erica pinifolia Salisb.; Erica rosea Andrews; Erica speciosissima Klotzsch; Ericoides fulgidum (Andrews) Kuntze; Ericoides vestitum (Thunb.) Kuntze; Syringodea rosea (Andrews) G.Don; Syringodea vestita D.Don

= Erica vestita =

Species of flowering plant

Erica vestita is a plant belonging to the genus Erica and is part of the fynbos. The species is endemic to the Western Cape and occurs from Worcester to Riversdale.
