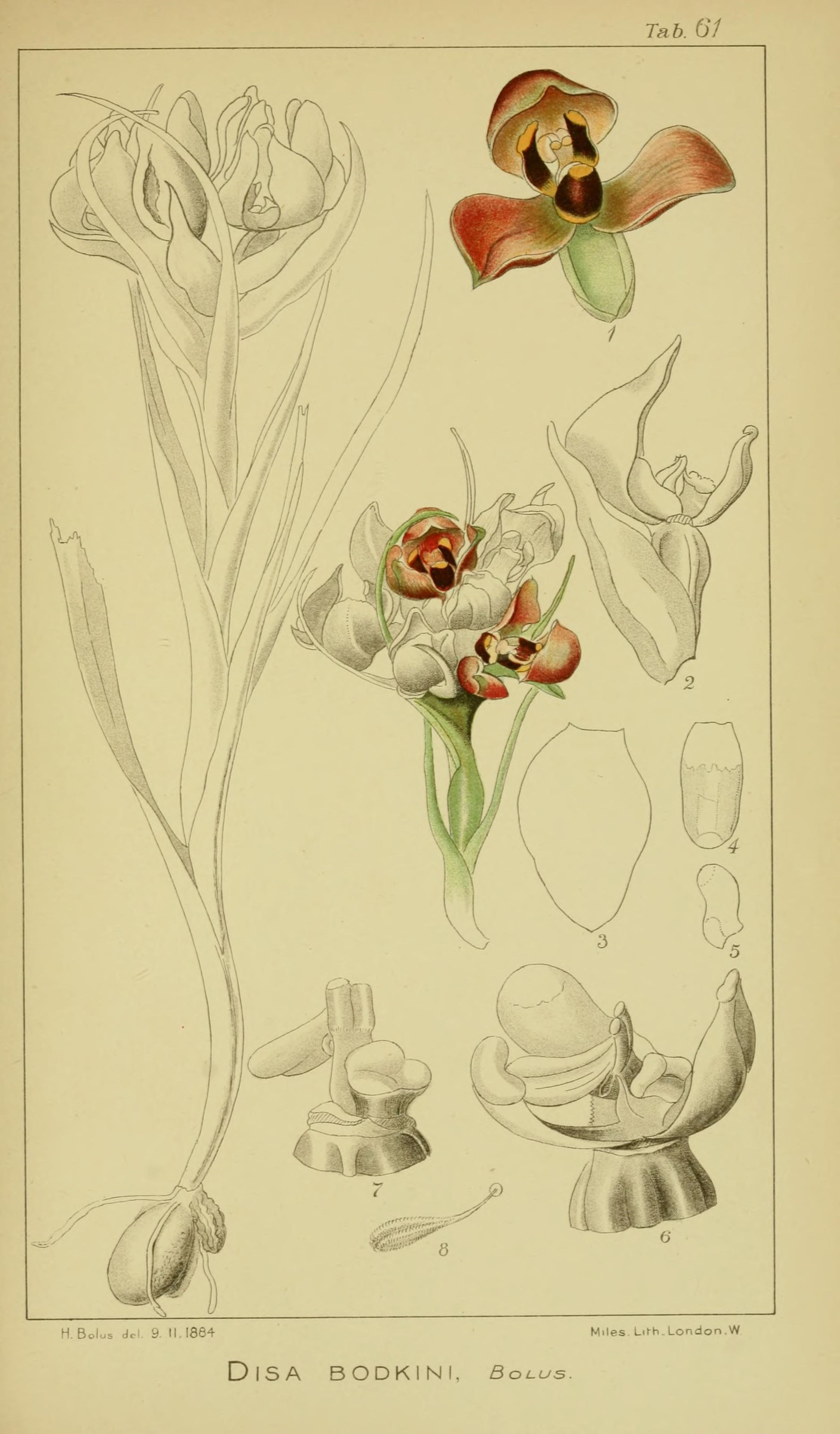

Conservation status
- Least Concern (IUCN 3.1)

Scientific classification
- Kingdom: Plantae
- Clade: Tracheophytes
- Clade: Angiosperms
- Clade: Monocots
- Order: Asparagales
- Family: Orchidaceae
- Subfamily: Orchidoideae
- Genus: Disa
- Species: D. bodkinii

Binomial name
- Disa bodkinii Bolus

Synonyms
- Orthopenthea bodkinii (Bolus) Rolfe

= Disa bodkinii =

Species of flowering plant

Disa bodkinii is a perennial plant and geophyte belonging to the genus Disa and is part of the fynbos. The plant is endemic to the Western Cape and occurs from the Cape Peninsula to Riversdale. The plant is not threatened but is naturally rare. It has only been recorded eight times because it only flowers after it has burned.
