= Springbok (disambiguation) =

A springbok is an antelope native to southern and western Africa.

Springbok may also refer to:

== Places ==
- Springbok, Northern Cape, a town in South Africa
- Springbok, Mpumalanga, a populated place in South Africa
- Springbokfontein, a town in South Africa

== Sports ==
- The South Africa national rugby union team, known as the Springboks
- The South Africa women's national rugby union team, known as the Springbok Women
- Springbok colours, formerly awarded to South African sportsmen and women representing the country in international competitions
- The South Africa national cricket team used to be known as the Springboks, but are now referred to as the Proteas
- Springbok (horse), for the American Thoroughbred racehorse who won the 1873 Belmont Stakes
- Springbok (greyhounds), a leading novice hurdle competition in the greyhound racing calendar

== Other uses ==
- Springbok, the callsign of South African Airways
- Springbok Radio, a former South African radio station
- Gladiators: Springbok Challenge, a series of specials for the Gladiators television sport franchise
- Springbokkie, a cocktail shooter that is popular in South Africa
- Springbok Nude Girls, a rock band from Cape Town, South Africa
- Springbok, a LNER Thompson Class B1 locomotive.
- Springbok, a brand of jigsaw puzzles formerly owned by Hallmark Cards and (since 2001) by Allied Materials.

== See also ==
- Springbox (disambiguation)
