= 1852 in South Africa =

- Decades: 1830s; 1840s; 1850s; 1860s; 1870s
- See also: List of years in South Africa

The following lists events that happened during 1852 in South Africa.

== Events ==
=== January ===
- 17 January – The South African Republic is established with the signing of the Sand River Convention

=== February ===
- 26 February – The British troopship, HMS Birkenhead is wrecked near Gansbaai, Western Cape

=== March ===
- 16 March – Voortrekker leaders, Andries Pretorius and Hendrik Potgieter reconcile

=== Unknown date ===
- Copper mining begins at Springbokfontein

== Deaths ==
- 25 June – Ludwig Heinrich Beil, musician and botanist, dies in Keurbooms River near Plettenberg Bay
- 16 December – Hendrik Potgieter, (59), Voortrekker leader, dies in Zoutpansbergdorp
