= List of heritage sites in Simon's Town =

Sites recognised by SAHRA

This is a list of the heritage sites in Simon's Town as recognized by the South African Heritage Resources Agency.

SAHRA identifier	Site name	Description	Town	District	NHRA status	Coordinates	Image
9/2/081/0001	Albertyn Cottage, King George Way, Simonstown	Type of site: House Current use: Tenant.	Cape Town, Simonstown	Simonstown	Provincial Heritage Site	34°11′34″S 18°26′06″E	Type of site: House Current use: Tenant.
9/2/081/0002	La Rochelle, 92 Main Road, St James, Cape Town	Built by Emmanuel Otto Rathfelder in 1902. Type of site: House Current use: Residential. These seven properties form an integral part of the only remaining concentration of early twentieth century Edwardian beach houses in South Africa.	Cape Town, St James	Simonstown	Provincial Heritage Site	34°07′14″S 18°27′22″E	Built by Emmanuel Otto Rathfelder in 1902. Type of site: House Current use: Residential. These seven properties form an integral part of the only remaining concentration of early twentieth century Edwardian beach houses in South Africa.
9/2/081/0003	Archaeological sites, Partridge Point, near Cape Point, Simonstown			Simonstown			Upload Photo
9/2/081/0004	Posthuys, Main Road, Muizenberg, Cape Town	This building was originally erected in February 1673 by the Dutch East India Company as a military observation post. It was later also used as a civilian dwelling-house and was owned by Sir J. B. Robinson from 1915 to 1929. Type of site: House Previous use: Residential. Current use: Museum. This building was originally erected in February 1673 by the Dutch East India Company as a military observation post. It was later also used as a civilian dwelling-house and was owned by Sir J. B. Robinson from 1915 to 1929.	Cape Town, Muizenberg	Simonstown	Provincial Heritage Site	34°06′37″S 18°28′01″E	This building was originally erected in February 1673 by the Dutch East India Company as a military observation post. It was later also used as a civilian dwelling-house and was owned by Sir J. B. Robinson from 1915 to 1929. Type of site: House Previous use: Residential. Current use: Museum. This building was originally erected in February 1673 by the Dutch East India Company as a military observation post. It was later also used as a civilian dwelling-house and was owned by Sir J. B. Robinson from 1915 to 1929.
9/2/081/0005	Welcome Cottage, Glencairn, Simonstown District	The land on which Welcome Cottage is built was granted in Perpetual Quitrent to Johannes Henricus Brand, Deputy Fiscal of Simon's Town, in 1811. He later became Member of the Court of Justice. JHBrand's son, Christoffel, was the first Speaker of the Hou Type of site: House Previous use: Residential. Current use: Residential. Historical/ Architectural significance: The land on which Welcome Cottage is built was granted in Perpetual Quitrent to Johannes Henricus Brand, Deputy Fiscal of Simon's Town, in 1811. He later became Member of the Court of Justice. JHBrand's son, Christoffel, was the first Speaker of the House of Assembly and his grandson, Johannes Henricus Brand, became the first President of the Orange Free State. Both the main homestead and the outbuildings are predominantly Cape Dutch in style and of considerable architectural merit.	Cape Town, Glencairn	Simonstown	Provincial Heritage Site	34°09′12″S 18°24′27″E	The land on which Welcome Cottage is built was granted in Perpetual Quitrent to Johannes Henricus Brand, Deputy Fiscal of Simon's Town, in 1811. He later became Member of the Court of Justice. JHBrand's son, Christoffel, was the first Speaker of the Hou Type of site: House Previous use: Residential. Current use: Residential. Historical/ Architectural significance: The land on which Welcome Cottage is built was granted in Perpetual Quitrent to Johannes Henricus Brand, Deputy Fiscal of Simon's Town, in 1811. He later became Member of the Court of Justice. JHBrand's son, Christoffel, was the first Speaker of the House of Assembly and his grandson, Johannes Henricus Brand, became the first President of the Orange Free State. Both the main homestead and the outbuildings are predominantly Cape Dutch in style and of considerable architectural merit.
9/2/081/0006	Corriemar, 4 Main Road, St James, Cape Town	Type of site: House Current use: Residential.	Cape Town, St James	Simonstown	Provincial Heritage Site	34°07′22″S 18°27′12″E	Type of site: House Current use: Residential.
9/2/081/0007	270 Main Road, St James, Cape Town			Simonstown		34°06′56″S 18°27′44″E	Upload Photo
9/2/081/0008	60 Simonstown Road, Fish Hoek	Both 60 and 62 originally formed part of the farm owned by K.S. de Villiers, known as the land baron of the area. He died in 1916 and the property was soon afterwards subdivided into lots to form the township now known as Fish Hoek. NO. 60 SIMONSTOWN ROAD Type of site: House Current use: Residential. The original portions of these two cottages dated from 1919 and were built as seaside cottages by affluent residents of Cape Town. Additions were made as and when necessary.	Cape Town, Fish Hoek	Simonstown	Provincial Heritage Site	34°08′35″S 18°26′04″E	Both 60 and 62 originally formed part of the farm owned by K.S. de Villiers, known as the land baron of the area. He died in 1916 and the property was soon afterwards subdivided into lots to form the township now known as Fish Hoek. NO. 60 SIMONSTOWN ROAD Type of site: House Current use: Residential. The original portions of these two cottages dated from 1919 and were built as seaside cottages by affluent residents of Cape Town. Additions were made as and when necessary.
9/2/081/0009	SIMONSTOWN MUNICIPAL AREA, GENERAL			Simonstown			Upload Photo
9/2/081/0010	Silvermine, Zilvermyn Simonstown District			Simonstown		34°04′30″S 18°23′56″E	Upload Photo
9/2/081/0011	Colwyn, 22 Main Road, St James, Cape Town	Type of site: House. Current use: Residential. These seven properties form an integral part of the only remaining concentration of early twentieth century Edwardian beach houses in South Africa.	Cape Town, St James	Simonstown	Provincial Heritage Site	34°07′12″S 18°27′25″E	Type of site: House. Current use: Residential. These seven properties form an integral part of the only remaining concentration of early twentieth century Edwardian beach houses in South Africa.
9/2/081/0012	Marine Hotel, Muizenberg, Cape Town			Simonstown			Upload Photo
9/2/081/0013	Methodist Church, Chapel Lane, Simonstown			Simonstown		34°11′35″S 18°25′40″E	Upload Photo
9/2/081/0014	Baddeley House, 1 Hope Street, Simonstown			Simonstown		34°11′34″S 18°25′35″E	Upload Photo
9/2/081/0015	KALK BAY LOCAL AREA, GENERAL			Simonstown			Upload Photo
9/2/081/0016	Peer's Cave, Fish Hoek, Simonstown District			Simonstown		34°07′06″S 18°24′24″E	Upload Photo
9/2/081/0017	Villa Capri, 86 Main Road, St James, Cape Town	The ground on which this house stands was granted to Johan Hendrik Muller on 4 April 1814. The house was presumably built as early as 1795. It is very probable that in the course of its long life the house has had some alterations, for instance the kitchen has been modernised and brick lean-to rooms were built on at the rear, probably in this century. The entrance which used to be at the side has been changed to the front and some very inappropriate steps were added in the front. The main structure, however, it remains basically unchanged. The house is on the lines of most of those built in the early days of Kalk Bay— a long front, with a step running the full length, and a hipped thatched roof. It is said to be one of the oldest surviving houses along the coast from Glencairn to Muizenberg. What gives the house particular importance is that it was once a whaling station. Under it is a long stone-built cellar running the full length of the house. It has been divided longitudinally, and the front section could have accommodated a small boat beat, which was long and narrow. The back section has a raised platform with compartments along the back, which presumably had been used as slave quarters, but could well have been used for storing barrels of oil and whaling equipment. There used to be a blubber pot in the grounds and the corner posts of the fence were of whale bone which lasted better than wood. The house is situated on a large property with an attractive garden. Type of site: Residential, Whaling Station Current use: Residential.	Cape Town, St James	Simonstown	Provincial Heritage Site	34°07′13″S 18°27′24″E	The ground on which this house stands was granted to Johan Hendrik Muller on 4 April 1814. The house was presumably built as early as 1795. It is very probable that in the course of its long life the house has had some alterations, for instance the kitchen has been modernised and brick lean-to rooms were built on at the rear, probably in this century. The entrance which used to be at the side has been changed to the front and some very inappropriate steps were added in the front. The main structure, however, it remains basically unchanged. The house is on the lines of most of those built in the early days of Kalk Bay— a long front, with a step running the full length, and a hipped thatched roof. It is said to be one of the oldest surviving houses along the coast from Glencairn to Muizenberg. What gives the house particular importance is that it was once a whaling station. Under it is a long stone-built cellar running the full length of the house. It has been divided longitudinally, and the front section could have accommodated a small boat beat, which was long and narrow. The back section has a raised platform with compartments along the back, which presumably had been used as slave quarters, but could well have been used for storing barrels of oil and whaling equipment. There used to be a blubber pot in the grounds and the corner posts of the fence were of whale bone which lasted better than wood. The house is situated on a large property with an attractive garden. Type of site: Residential, Whaling Station Current use: Residential.
9/2/081/0018	Schoonzicht, 204 Main Road, Kalk Bay, Cape Town	Type of site: House Current use: Residential.	Cape Town, Kalk Bay	Simonstown	Provincial Heritage Site	34°07′56″S 18°26′46″E	Type of site: House Current use: Residential.
9/2/081/0019	Vergenoeg, 42 Royal Road, Muizenberg, Cape Town	The house stands on a relatively small strip of land between Royal Road and the shores of Muizenberg beach; The facade of the house consists of two bays joined together by an enclosed verandah on the lower level and an enclosed patio on the first floor. This magnificent double storeyed residence was designed by Sir Herbert Baker for his friend Alpheus Williams, general manager of De Beers Consolidated Mines, at the same time as he was busy building his own seaside cottage "Sandhills" in 1903. Type of site: House Current use: Residential. This impressive double-storeyed beach house with its gables in the Flemish revival style was designed by Sir Herbert Baker. It was built in 1903 for Alpheus Williams, the General Manager of De Beers Consolidated Mines.	Cape Town, Muizenberg	Simonstown	Provincial Heritage Site	34°06′14″S 18°28′40″E	The house stands on a relatively small strip of land between Royal Road and the shores of Muizenberg beach; The facade of the house consists of two bays joined together by an enclosed verandah on the lower level and an enclosed patio on the first floor. This magnificent double storeyed residence was designed by Sir Herbert Baker for his friend Alpheus Williams, general manager of De Beers Consolidated Mines, at the same time as he was busy building his own seaside cottage "Sandhills" in 1903. Type of site: House Current use: Residential. This impressive double-storeyed beach house with its gables in the Flemish revival style was designed by Sir Herbert Baker. It was built in 1903 for Alpheus Williams, the General Manager of De Beers Consolidated Mines.
9/2/081/0020	Hugo Tomb, Simonstown	Type of site: Vault Current use: Vault.	Cape Town, Simonstown	Simonstown	Provincial Heritage Site	34°12′28″S 18°27′32″E	Type of site: Vault Current use: Vault.
9/2/081/0021	MUIZENBERG LOCAL AREA, GENERAL			Simonstown			Upload Photo
9/2/081/0022	3-5 Simon's Town Road, Fish Hoek, Simonstown District			Simonstown		34°08′31″S 18°25′54″E	Upload Photo
9/2/081/0023	The Homestead, Ley Road, St James, Cape Town			Simonstown		34°07′14″S 18°27′21″E	Upload Photo
9/2/081/0024	Garden Remembrance, Simonstown			Simonstown			Upload Photo
9/2/081/0025	The Homestead, 10 Montrose Avenue, Clovelly, Fish Hoek	The Homestead which is situated in Montrose Avenue overlooks the Fish Hoek valley and into the setting sun. The house, which originally consisted of a "voorkamer" with rooms leading off to the left and right, with a high pitched roof (presumably thatch) The walls were low and to accommodate this the doors are of normal width but low requiring one to bend your head when passing through. The present owner removed the dilapidated boards and took the ceiling into the loft area giving the rooms a pleasant vaulted appearance. A hearth which was presumably built shortly after the erection of the house was so big that it is now used as a dining alcove. To accommodate this an "afdak" was built consisting, today, of a kitchen, pantry, dining room, storeroom, toilet and bathroom - not large but adequate. A verandah was added over a high stoep. On the right end a "stoepkemer" was fitted in. This part is the most recent addition possibly dating from the twenties judging by the twin—type of masonry pillars which supports the verandah roof. The house is whitewashed with timber and roof painted black and hedged in with shrubs, trees and a high front boundary wall. Cobbled paths lead through a neat and well kept garden. Clovelly which was originally known as "Klein Tuin" during the Dutch East India Company’s sojourn, originally formed part of the Fish Hoek Valley which was divided in 1827 into three separate sections and allocated to owners. Photographic evidence from this period shows the original portion of the house already in existence. The back portion thereof is reputed to have been built during the latter half of the nineteenth century. This is the oldest house in the Clovelly valley.	Cape Town, Clovelly	Simonstown	Provincial Heritage Site	34°07′35″S 18°25′57″E	The Homestead which is situated in Montrose Avenue overlooks the Fish Hoek valley and into the setting sun. The house, which originally consisted of a "voorkamer" with rooms leading off to the left and right, with a high pitched roof (presumably thatch) The walls were low and to accommodate this the doors are of normal width but low requiring one to bend your head when passing through. The present owner removed the dilapidated boards and took the ceiling into the loft area giving the rooms a pleasant vaulted appearance. A hearth which was presumably built shortly after the erection of the house was so big that it is now used as a dining alcove. To accommodate this an "afdak" was built consisting, today, of a kitchen, pantry, dining room, storeroom, toilet and bathroom - not large but adequate. A verandah was added over a high stoep. On the right end a "stoepkemer" was fitted in. This part is the most recent addition possibly dating from the twenties judging by the twin—type of masonry pillars which supports the verandah roof. The house is whitewashed with timber and roof painted black and hedged in with shrubs, trees and a high front boundary wall. Cobbled paths lead through a neat and well kept garden. Clovelly which was originally known as "Klein Tuin" during the Dutch East India Company’s sojourn, originally formed part of the Fish Hoek Valley which was divided in 1827 into three separate sections and allocated to owners. Photographic evidence from this period shows the original portion of the house already in existence. The back portion thereof is reputed to have been built during the latter half of the nineteenth century. This is the oldest house in the Clovelly valley.
9/2/081/0026	Coelnamara, 20 Main Road, St James, Cape Town	Type of site: House. Current use: Residential. These seven properties form an integral part of the only remaining concentration of early twentieth century Edwardian beach houses in South Africa.	Cape Town, St James	Simonstown	Provincial Heritage Site	34°07′25″S 18°27′09″E	Type of site: House. Current use: Residential. These seven properties form an integral part of the only remaining concentration of early twentieth century Edwardian beach houses in South Africa.
9/2/081/0027	Yokohama, 20 Main Road, Muizenberg, Cape Town			Simonstown		34°06′05″S 18°28′05″E	Upload Photo
9/2/081/0028	Long Cottage, 248 Main Road, Muizenberg, Cape Town	Type of site: House Current use: Residential.	Cape Town, Muizenberg	Simonstown	Provincial Heritage Site	34°06′52″S 18°27′50″E	Type of site: House Current use: Residential.
9/2/081/0029	Roman Rock Lighthouse, Simonstown District			Simonstown		34°10′53″S 18°27′36″E	
9/2/081/0030	Military Ruins between Boyes Drive & Main Road, Muizenberg, Cape Town			Simonstown			Upload Photo
9/2/081/0031	Railway Station, Main Road, Muizenberg, Cape Town	Although the railway line to Muizenberg was opened on 15 December 1882, just in time for the summer season, the station building was only erected in 1912/1913. In the meantime a shed-type building served as a station. The new building was opened on 7 June 1913 by the then Minister of Railways and Harbours, Mr. Henry Burton. Along with 300 guests he travelled first to Kalk Bay where he laid the first block of the breakwater. The trainload, of passengers then returned to Muizenberg where Mr. Burton officially opened the station by unlocking the door and purchasing the first ticket. This is a unique station building and a fine example of the Edwardian era. The station is situated on Main Road and in very close proximity to the Post Huys, which is now a major tourist attraction. The old Carnegie Library, now the police station and the Court House which both date from about 1910, are situated next door to the Post Huys. These buildings together, form an important, pleasing and very historic street facade along this section of the False Bay coastline. The building belongs to State and resorts under the Railways and Harbours Administration. Visual Description: The central portion of the building, in which the booking hall is situated, is a double-storey surmounted by an impressive clock tower. An interesting feature is the gables which appear to be a revival of the mid-eighteenth-century Flemish style. The floor of the booking hall is decorated with encaustic black and white tiles. The cast iron stairway, with teak handrail, is also noteworthy. On the platform side of the building an attractive 1930 addition extends from the second storey over the arched colonnade. A single wing extends from either side of the main building and these wings are gable ended. Each wing also has a smaller Flemish type gable on the front and back. All the windows, arches and corners are heavily rusticated with sandstone blocks. Red brick. Stone quoining to openings and corners. asbestos slate roof Type of site: Railway Station Current use: Railway station / commercial.	Cape Town, Muizenberg	Simonstown	Provincial Heritage Site	34°06′34″S 18°28′03″E	Although the railway line to Muizenberg was opened on 15 December 1882, just in time for the summer season, the station building was only erected in 1912/1913. In the meantime a shed-type building served as a station. The new building was opened on 7 June 1913 by the then Minister of Railways and Harbours, Mr. Henry Burton. Along with 300 guests he travelled first to Kalk Bay where he laid the first block of the breakwater. The trainload, of passengers then returned to Muizenberg where Mr. Burton officially opened the station by unlocking the door and purchasing the first ticket. This is a unique station building and a fine example of the Edwardian era. The station is situated on Main Road and in very close proximity to the Post Huys, which is now a major tourist attraction. The old Carnegie Library, now the police station and the Court House which both date from about 1910, are situated next door to the Post Huys. These buildings together, form an important, pleasing and very historic street facade along this section of the False Bay coastline. The building belongs to State and resorts under the Railways and Harbours Administration. Visual Description: The central portion of the building, in which the booking hall is situated, is a double-storey surmounted by an impressive clock tower. An interesting feature is the gables which appear to be a revival of the mid-eighteenth-century Flemish style. The floor of the booking hall is decorated with encaustic black and white tiles. The cast iron stairway, with teak handrail, is also noteworthy. On the platform side of the building an attractive 1930 addition extends from the second storey over the arched colonnade. A single wing extends from either side of the main building and these wings are gable ended. Each wing also has a smaller Flemish type gable on the front and back. All the windows, arches and corners are heavily rusticated with sandstone blocks. Red brick. Stone quoining to openings and corners. asbestos slate roof Type of site: Railway Station Current use: Railway station / commercial. Media related to Muizenberg station at Wikimedia Commons
9/2/081/0032	Holy Trinity Church, Main Road, Kalk Bay, Cape Town			Simonstown		34°08′04″S 18°25′59″E	Upload Photo
9/2/081/0033	Seaforth Cemetery, Simonstown			Simonstown		34°11′45″S 18°26′33″E	Upload Photo
9/2/081/0034	Old Police Station, 186 Main Road, Muizenberg, Cape Town	Type of site: Police Station Previous use: Police station. Current use: Museum.	Cape Town, Muizenberg	Simonstown	Provincial Heritage Site	34°06′39″S 18°28′00″E	Type of site: Police Station Previous use: Police station. Current use: Museum.
9/2/081/0035	Old Magistrate's Court, 184 Main Road, Muizenberg, Cape Town	Type of site: Courthouse Previous use: Magistrate's court. Current use: Museum.	Cape Town, Muizenberg	Simonstown	Provincial Heritage Site	34°06′38″S 18°28′00″E	Type of site: Courthouse Previous use: Magistrate's court. Current use: Museum.
9/2/081/0036	De Goede Hoop Estate, Noordhoek, Simonstown District	Type of site: House. "De Goede Hoop" is a unique example of the influence of Herbert Baker and his associates on South African architecture.	Cape Town, Noordhoek	Simonstown	Provincial Heritage Site	34°05′35″S 18°22′38″E	Type of site: House. "De Goede Hoop" is a unique example of the influence of Herbert Baker and his associates on South African architecture.
9/2/081/0037	FISH HOEK MUNICIPAL AREA, SIMONSTOWN DISTRICT, GENERAL			Simonstown			Upload Photo
9/2/081/0038	Cape Point Nature Reserve, Simonstown District			Simonstown		34°21′24″S 18°29′49″E	
9/2/081/0039	Admiralty House, St Georges Street, Simonstown	Original grant to Antoni Visser in May 1743. First permanent building in Simon's Town. (There was a building on site by 1740.) Building of similar dimensions as to existing is shown on a plan of 1760. Originally a guesthouse, private residence and bought by the navy in 1814. Rear-Admiral Sir Jahleel Brenton was the first of many admirals to live here. The building was changed considerably in 1853. Type of site: Residency.	Cape Town, Simonstown	Simonstown	Provincial Heritage Site	34°11′36″S 18°25′57″E	Original grant to Antoni Visser in May 1743. First permanent building in Simon's Town. (There was a building on site by 1740.) Building of similar dimensions as to existing is shown on a plan of 1760. Originally a guesthouse, private residence and bought by the navy in 1814. Rear-Admiral Sir Jahleel Brenton was the first of many admirals to live here. The building was changed considerably in 1853. Type of site: Residency.
9/2/081/0040	Canty Bay House, 196 Main Road, Muizenberg, Cape Town	Type of site: House Current use: Residential. These seven properties form an integral part of the only remaining concentration of early twentieth century Edwardian beach houses in South Africa.	Cape Town, Muizenberg	Simonstown	Provincial Heritage Site	34°06′41″S 18°27′58″E	Type of site: House Current use: Residential. These seven properties form an integral part of the only remaining concentration of early twentieth century Edwardian beach houses in South Africa.
9/2/081/0041	Bayview, 66 Simon's Town Road, Fish Hoek, Simonstown District			Simonstown		34°08′36″S 18°26′06″E	Upload Photo
9/2/081/0042	No.1, The Gardens, Simonstown			Simonstown		34°11′40″S 18°25′53″E	Upload Photo
9/2/081/0043	Glass factory site, Glencairn, Simonstown			Simonstown			Upload Photo
9/2/081/0044	Old Dutch Reformed Church, 52 Main Road, Kalk Bay, Cape Town	Type of site: Church Previous use: Church. Current use: Theatre	Cape Town, Kalk Bay	Simonstown	Provisional Protection	34°07′31″S 18°27′03″E	Type of site: Church Previous use: Church. Current use: Theatre
9/2/081/0045	Natale Labia Museum, 190-194 Main Road, Muizenberg, Cape Town	Type of site: House Previous use: Residential. Current use: Gallery. These seven properties form an integral part of the only remaining concentration of early twentieth century Edwardian beach houses in South Africa.	Cape Town, Muizenberg	Simonstown	Provincial Heritage Site	34°06′41″S 18°27′59″E	Type of site: House Previous use: Residential. Current use: Gallery. These seven properties form an integral part of the only remaining concentration of early twentieth century Edwardian beach houses in South Africa.
9/2/081/0046	SA Naval Museum, West Dockyard, Simonstown	Type of site: Church, Museum Previous use: Church /. Current use: Museum.	Cape Town, Simonstown	Simonstown	Provincial Heritage Site	34°11′30″S 18°25′38″E	Type of site: Church, Museum Previous use: Church /. Current use: Museum. Media related to South African Naval Museum at Wikimedia Commons
9/2/081/0047	Muizenberg High School, Windermere Street, Muizenberg, Cape Town			Simonstown		34°05′51″S 18°28′37″E	Upload Photo
9/2/081/0048	The Kraal, 7 Hillside Road, Fish Hoek			Simonstown		34°08′38″S 18°26′05″E	Upload Photo
9/2/081/0049	Hot shot canonball oven, Main Road, Simonstown			Simonstown			Upload Photo
9/2/081/0050	Rhodes Cottage, 246 Main Road, Muizenberg, Cape Town	Rhodes’s cottage stands on the main road to Simons town, facing the sea between Muizenberg and St. James. It was formerly known as Barkly Cottage. Cecil Rhodes bought it on 27 February 1899, from the estate of J. R. Reid. At the end of that year the Anglo-Boer War broke out and Kimberley was besieged. Rhodes was in Kimberley during the siege, but when the siege was raised early in 1900 he returned to this cottage at Muizenberg to recover his strength. However, it was after his return from England in February, 1902, that he became most closely associated with the cottage. Almost immediately on his arrival at Groote Schuur he drove down to the cottage in the 12-14 h.p. Wolseley car he had brought with him from England. He was already suffering from the heart disease which was to cause his death. He retired to bed immediately but he could not lie down and had to sit propped up by pillows. The weather was extremely hot and the cottage had an iron roof at that time, so a hole was made in the wall next to his bed to give him more air. While he was in this condition he had to give evidence against Princess Radziwill who had defrauded him of thousands of rand. On 26 March 1902, just before six o’clock in the evening, he died here in this house. The cottage remained in the possession of the Rhodes Trustees until 1932, when they donated it to the government of Northern Rhodesia, who transferred it to the City Council of Cape Town in 1937. Type of site: House Current use: Museum.	Cape Town, Muizenberg	Simonstown	Provincial Heritage Site	34°06′52″S 18°27′51″E	Rhodes’s cottage stands on the main road to Simons town, facing the sea between Muizenberg and St. James. It was formerly known as Barkly Cottage. Cecil Rhodes bought it on 27 February 1899, from the estate of J. R. Reid. At the end of that year the Anglo-Boer War broke out and Kimberley was besieged. Rhodes was in Kimberley during the siege, but when the siege was raised early in 1900 he returned to this cottage at Muizenberg to recover his strength. However, it was after his return from England in February, 1902, that he became most closely associated with the cottage. Almost immediately on his arrival at Groote Schuur he drove down to the cottage in the 12-14 h.p. Wolseley car he had brought with him from England. He was already suffering from the heart disease which was to cause his death. He retired to bed immediately but he could not lie down and had to sit propped up by pillows. The weather was extremely hot and the cottage had an iron roof at that time, so a hole was made in the wall next to his bed to give him more air. While he was in this condition he had to give evidence against Princess Radziwill who had defrauded him of thousands of rand. On 26 March 1902, just before six o’clock in the evening, he died here in this house. The cottage remained in the possession of the Rhodes Trustees until 1932, when they donated it to the government of Northern Rhodesia, who transferred it to the City Council of Cape Town in 1937. Type of site: House Current use: Museum.
9/2/081/0051	Studland, St Georges Street, Simonstown	This building was built as a "Wine House" or tavern in 1897 by J. P. Eksteen and is probably the oldest building of its kind in South Africa. This building was built as a "Wine House" or tavern in 1897 by J. P. Eksteen and is probably the oldest building of its kind in South Africa.	Cape Town, Simonstown	Simonstown	Provincial Heritage Site	34°11′36″S 18°26′05″E	This building was built as a "Wine House" or tavern in 1897 by J. P. Eksteen and is probably the oldest building of its kind in South Africa. This building was built as a "Wine House" or tavern in 1897 by J. P. Eksteen and is probably the oldest building of its kind in South Africa.
9/2/081/0052	St Francis of Assisi Church, 2 Court Road, Simonstown	This church was completed in 1837 and was consecrated on 30 July 1837. Type of site: Church Current use: Church : Anglican. This church was completed in 1837 and was consecrated on 30 July 1837.	Cape Town, Simonstown	Simonstown	Provincial Heritage Site	34°11′28″S 18°25′39″E	This church was completed in 1837 and was consecrated on 30 July 1837. Type of site: Church Current use: Church : Anglican. This church was completed in 1837 and was consecrated on 30 July 1837.
9/2/081/0053	Palace Barracks, Palace Hill Road, Simonstown	Late 1700s. Land granted to Jan Hendrik Munnik in Oct 1784. House clearly in existence by 1798. 1813 bought by John Osmond. Owned by William Coghill, and bought by the Imperial Government in 1886. Converted to a South African War Hospital in 1900 for Type of site: House.	Cape Town, Simonstown	Simonstown	Provincial Heritage Site	34°11′11″S 18°25′27″E	Late 1700s. Land granted to Jan Hendrik Munnik in Oct 1784. House clearly in existence by 1798. 1813 bought by John Osmond. Owned by William Coghill, and bought by the Imperial Government in 1886. Converted to a South African War Hospital in 1900 for Type of site: House.
9/2/081/0054	Ibeka, Cornwall Road, Simonstown	This land was one of the original erven granted in Simonstown. Built in 1816 by PJ Truter Jnr, Collector of Customs who owned it until 1842. In 1840 it was leased by the government as a temporary isolation hospital for smallpox patients, and in the follo.	Cape Town, Simonstown	Simonstown	Provincial Heritage Site	34°11′34″S 18°25′37″E	This land was one of the original erven granted in Simonstown. Built in 1816 by PJ Truter Jnr, Collector of Customs who owned it until 1842. In 1840 it was leased by the government as a temporary isolation hospital for smallpox patients, and in the follo.
9/2/081/0055	Martello Tower, Simonstown	The Martello Tower circular with a wall six feet thick and about 25 feet in height. The Martello Tower was erected in 1796 on Sir James Craig's orders, to make the defence system of Simonstown more effective. It is claimed that this is the oldest British structure of its kind in the world and also the first building to be erected after t Type of site: Martello Tower. It is claimed that this is the oldest British structure of its kind in the world and also the first building to be erected after the British occupation of the Cape.	Cape Town, Simonstown	Simonstown	Provincial Heritage Site	34°11′38″S 18°26′08″E	The Martello Tower circular with a wall six feet thick and about 25 feet in height. The Martello Tower was erected in 1796 on Sir James Craig's orders, to make the defence system of Simonstown more effective. It is claimed that this is the oldest British structure of its kind in the world and also the first building to be erected after t Type of site: Martello Tower. It is claimed that this is the oldest British structure of its kind in the world and also the first building to be erected after the British occupation of the Cape. Media related to Martello Tower, Simon's Town at Wikimedia Commons
9/2/081/0056	Dutch Reformed Church, St Georges Street, Simonstown	The foundation stone of this church was laid on 10 December 1855 and the church building itself was consecrated on 10 December 1856. The church is closely linked to the history of Simonstown. The music for the national anthem was composed in the adjoining Type of site: Church Current use: Church : Dutch Reformed. The church is closely linked to the history of Simonstown. The music for the national anthem was composed in the adjoining parsonage, in 1921 by the then minister of the congregation, the Reverend M. L. de Villiers.	Cape Town, Simonstown	Simonstown	Provincial Heritage Site	34°11′36″S 18°25′57″E	The foundation stone of this church was laid on 10 December 1855 and the church building itself was consecrated on 10 December 1856. The church is closely linked to the history of Simonstown. The music for the national anthem was composed in the adjoining Type of site: Church Current use: Church : Dutch Reformed. The church is closely linked to the history of Simonstown. The music for the national anthem was composed in the adjoining parsonage, in 1921 by the then minister of the congregation, the Reverend M. L. de Villiers.
9/2/081/0057	Old Union Tavern, Smith Lane, Simonstown	The Union was a tavern occupying a plot 80 by 60 feet on Smith Street, bought from the widow Rossouw in 1801. The purchaser, Johannes Bissinger, wasted no time in erecting the building and in taking out licences to keep a billiard table and to sell wine.	Cape Town, Simonstown	Simonstown	Provincial Heritage Site	34°11′38″S 18°26′08″E	The Union was a tavern occupying a plot 80 by 60 feet on Smith Street, bought from the widow Rossouw in 1801. The purchaser, Johannes Bissinger, wasted no time in erecting the building and in taking out licences to keep a billiard table and to sell wine.
9/2/081/0058	Stempastorie Museum, Church Street, Simonstown	This double-storeyed building was erected in 1815 by the building contractor Herman Schutte. The veranda was added in 1820. The music for the National Anthem, "Die Stem van Suid-Afrika", was composed here in 1919 by the Rev. M. L. de Villiers. ?????? Type of site: Pastorie Previous use: Parsonage. Current use: Museum.	Cape Town, Simonstown	Simonstown	Provincial Heritage Site	34°11′37″S 18°26′07″E	This double-storeyed building was erected in 1815 by the building contractor Herman Schutte. The veranda was added in 1820. The music for the National Anthem, "Die Stem van Suid-Afrika", was composed here in 1919 by the Rev. M. L. de Villiers. ?????? Type of site: Pastorie Previous use: Parsonage. Current use: Museum.
9/2/081/0059	Old stables of Oatlands, Simonstown	This building was originally erected in the eighteenth century as stables for the well-known Oatlands property. Shortly after the Second British Occupation of the Cape it served as a guard house for some time. Type of site: Stables.	Cape Town, Simonstown	Simonstown	Provincial Heritage Site	34°11′38″S 18°26′08″E	This building was originally erected in the eighteenth century as stables for the well-known Oatlands property. Shortly after the Second British Occupation of the Cape it served as a guard house for some time. Type of site: Stables. Media related to Oatlands, Simon's Town at Wikimedia Commons
9/2/081/0060	Bay View House, 134 St Georges Street, Simonstown	This double-storeyed building with its Georgian and Victorian features dates from the year 1803.	Cape Town, Simonstown	Simonstown	Provincial Heritage Site	34°11′36″S 18°26′10″E	This double-storeyed building with its Georgian and Victorian features dates from the year 1803.
9/2/081/0061	De Beers Building, 88 St Georges Street, Simonstown	This sandstone building, which dates from 1902, was designed by Sir Herbert Baker for Cecil Rhodes's De Beers Cold Storage Syndicate as meat outlet in Simon's Town. The building was used from 1903 to 1921 by the company's successor. Imperial Cold Storage Type of site: Commercial Previous use: Bank; Restaurant. Current use: Vacant.	Cape Town, Simonstown	Simonstown	Provincial Heritage Site	34°11′36″S 18°25′52″E	This sandstone building, which dates from 1902, was designed by Sir Herbert Baker for Cecil Rhodes's De Beers Cold Storage Syndicate as meat outlet in Simon's Town. The building was used from 1903 to 1921 by the company's successor. Imperial Cold Storage Type of site: Commercial Previous use: Bank; Restaurant. Current use: Vacant.
9/2/081/0062	Sea Fever, 82 Main Road, St James, Cape Town	"Sea Fever" is a pleasant seaside cottage on the mountain side of St. James Main Road. The cottage features a double hipped thatched roof with two dormer windows facing the sea. The high stoep is covered with a corrugated iron verandah and enclosed with g Type of site: House Current use: Residential.	Cape Town, St James	Simonstown	Provincial Heritage Site	34°07′11″S 18°27′26″E	"Sea Fever" is a pleasant seaside cottage on the mountain side of St. James Main Road. The cottage features a double hipped thatched roof with two dormer windows facing the sea. The high stoep is covered with a corrugated iron verandah and enclosed with g Type of site: House Current use: Residential.
9/2/081/0063	Watergate, 252 Main Road, Muizenberg, Cape Town	Italianate villa. Type of site: House Current use: Residential. These seven properties not only form an integral part of the only remaining concentration of early twentieth century Edwardian beach houses in South Africa, but also border on the old False Bay coastal road, which is regarded as one of the most beautiful	Cape Town, Muizenberg	Simonstown	Provincial Heritage Site	34°06′53″S 18°27′48″E	Italianate villa. Type of site: House Current use: Residential. These seven properties not only form an integral part of the only remaining concentration of early twentieth century Edwardian beach houses in South Africa, but also border on the old False Bay coastal road, which is regarded as one of the most beautiful
9/2/081/0064	Cavanmore, 32 Main Road, St James, Cape Town	Type of site: House Current use: Residential. These seven properties not only form an integral part of the only remaining concentration of early twentieth century Edwardian beach houses in South Africa, but also border on the old False Bay coastal road, which is regarded as one of the most beautiful	Cape Town, St James	Simonstown	Provincial Heritage Site	34°07′28″S 18°27′06″E	Type of site: House Current use: Residential. These seven properties not only form an integral part of the only remaining concentration of early twentieth century Edwardian beach houses in South Africa, but also border on the old False Bay coastal road, which is regarded as one of the most beautiful
9/2/081/0065	Braeside, Braemar Road, St James, Cape Town	Type of site: House Current use: Residential. off Main Road between 20 & 22 Main Road. This double-storeyed house not only forms an integral part of the only remaining concentration of early twentieth century Edwardian beach houses in South Africa, but also borders on the old False Bay coastal road, which is regarded as one of the most scen	Cape Town, St James	Simonstown	Provincial Heritage Site	34°07′11″S 18°27′18″E	Type of site: House Current use: Residential. off Main Road between 20 & 22 Main Road. This double-storeyed house not only forms an integral part of the only remaining concentration of early twentieth century Edwardian beach houses in South Africa, but also borders on the old False Bay coastal road, which is regarded as one of the most scen
9/2/081/0066	Greystones, 18 Main Road, St James, Cape Town	Type of site: House Current use: Residential.	Cape Town, St James	Simonstown	Provincial Heritage Site	34°07′25″S 18°27′09″E	Type of site: House Current use: Residential.
9/2/081/0067	Yarra Yarra, St Georges Street, Simonstown	A pair of semi-detached dwellings built in the garden of Studland in 1897. The architect was Vixseboxse. The building is plastered and. the front wings are painted in imitation of red face brick, while the gables have Queen Ann type wood ornamentation. E A pair of semi-detached dwellings built in the garden of Studland in 1897. The architect was Vixseboxse, once State Architect, first in the Transvaal Republic and later in the Orange Free State. This building was designed by a famous architect, once State Architect (Vixseboxse) first in the Transvaal Republic and later in the Orange Free State. It is also well preserved in its original state and is a good example of the architecture of its period	Cape Town, Simonstown	Simonstown	Provincial Heritage Site	34°11′36″S 18°25′57″E	A pair of semi-detached dwellings built in the garden of Studland in 1897. The architect was Vixseboxse. The building is plastered and. the front wings are painted in imitation of red face brick, while the gables have Queen Ann type wood ornamentation. E A pair of semi-detached dwellings built in the garden of Studland in 1897. The architect was Vixseboxse, once State Architect, first in the Transvaal Republic and later in the Orange Free State. This building was designed by a famous architect, once State Architect (Vixseboxse) first in the Transvaal Republic and later in the Orange Free State. It is also well preserved in its original state and is a good example of the architecture of its period
9/2/081/0068	Simon's Town Museum, 4 Court Road, Simon's Town	Type of site: Museum Previous use: Old Simon's Town Magistrate's Court. Current use: Simon's Town Museum.	Cape Town, Simon's Town	Simon's Town	Provincial Heritage Site	34°11′28″S 18°25′39″E	Type of site: Museum Previous use: Old Simon's Town Magistrate's Court. Current use: Simon's Town Museum.
9/2/081/0069	9 Inch MLR Gun, Middle North Battery, Simonstown	Type of site: Gun.	Cape Town, Simonstown	Simonstown	Heritage Object		Type of site: Gun. Media related to Middle North Battery, Simon's Town at Wikimedia Commons
9/2/081/0070	Stonehenge, 36 Main Road, St James, Cape Town	Type of site: House Current use: Residential.	Cape Town, St James	Simonstown	Provincial Heritage Site	34°07′29″S 18°27′05″E	Type of site: House Current use: Residential.
9/2/081/0071	Min-Y-Mor, 62 Simonstown Road, Fish Hoek, Simonstown District	Originally formed part of the farm owned by K.S. de Villiers, known as the land baron of the area. He died in 1916 and the property was soon afterwards subdivided into lots to form the township now known as Fish Hoek. NO. 62 SIMONSTOWN ROAD was sold on 10 Type of site: House Current use: Residential. The original portions of these two cottages dated from 1919 and were built as seaside cottages by affluent residents of Cape Town. Additions were made as and when necessary.	Cape Town, Fish Hoek	Simonstown	Provincial Heritage Site	34°08′36″S 18°26′05″E	Originally formed part of the farm owned by K.S. de Villiers, known as the land baron of the area. He died in 1916 and the property was soon afterwards subdivided into lots to form the township now known as Fish Hoek. NO. 62 SIMONSTOWN ROAD was sold on 10 Type of site: House Current use: Residential. The original portions of these two cottages dated from 1919 and were built as seaside cottages by affluent residents of Cape Town. Additions were made as and when necessary.
9/2/081/0072	Liscard, 181 Main Road, Kalk Bay, Cape Town	Flat roofed (mono). Front gable Type of site: House Current use: Residential.	Cape Town, Kalk Bay	Simonstown	Provincial Heritage Site	34°07′52″S 18°26′52″E	Flat roofed (mono). Front gable Type of site: House Current use: Residential.
9/2/081/0073	SIMONSTOWN MAGISTERIAL DISTRICT, GENERAL			Simonstown			Upload Photo
9/2/081/0073/01	State Land (Property), Simonstown			Simonstown			Upload Photo
9/2/081/0074	Oatlands, Oatland's Road, Simonstown	The land on which this property is situated, originally formed part of the Dutch East India Company’s "Groot Tuin". The "Groot Tuin" was first established in March 1743 and formed an integral part of Baron Van Imhoff' s plan for the development of Simon’s Type of site: Farmstead. This house, formerly known as the Government Garden House and later as the Commandant's House, probably dates from the end of the eighteenth century. Its inhabitants included Colonel John Graham and Captain (later Colonel) Henry Somerset. The name "Oatlan	Cape Town, Simonstown	Simonstown	Provincial Heritage Site	34°12′08″S 18°27′16″E	The land on which this property is situated, originally formed part of the Dutch East India Company’s "Groot Tuin". The "Groot Tuin" was first established in March 1743 and formed an integral part of Baron Van Imhoff' s plan for the development of Simon’s Type of site: Farmstead. This house, formerly known as the Government Garden House and later as the Commandant's House, probably dates from the end of the eighteenth century. Its inhabitants included Colonel John Graham and Captain (later Colonel) Henry Somerset. The name "Oatlan
9/2/081/0075	KOMMETJIE LOCAL AREA, GENERAL			Simonstown			Upload Photo
9/2/081/0076	The Outspan, Main Road, Kalk Bay, Cape Town			Simonstown		34°07′43″S 18°26′52″E	Upload Photo
9/2/081/0077	13 Devon Street, Simonstown			Simonstown		34°11′37″S 18°25′36″E	Upload Photo
9/2/081/0078	Simonstown Dockyard, General, Simonstown			Simonstown			Upload Photo
9/2/081/0079	Knight's Villa, 198 Main Road, Muizenberg, Cape Town	The house is a large Venetian-looking "palazzo". The Italian Renaissance effect is created through the use of Renaissance elements such as the arched entrance, balustrades, Tuscan columns on the second floor and unfluted Corinthian columns. The combination The first registered owner of this erf was Hendrik Albertyn obtained it in 1884. In 1901 Clifford Hume Knight bought the property and built the house himself. He was the American Vice-Council in Cape Town at the time of the Jameson Raid. The property was Type of site: House Current use: Residential. In 1901 Clifford Hume Knight bought this property and built the house. It was bought in 1939 by Princess Ida Labia. The large house is reminiscent of a Venetian "palazzo" and is in the neo-Renaissance style.	Cape Town, Muizenberg	Simonstown	Provincial Heritage Site	34°05′45″S 18°27′59″E	The house is a large Venetian-looking "palazzo". The Italian Renaissance effect is created through the use of Renaissance elements such as the arched entrance, balustrades, Tuscan columns on the second floor and unfluted Corinthian columns. The combination The first registered owner of this erf was Hendrik Albertyn obtained it in 1884. In 1901 Clifford Hume Knight bought the property and built the house himself. He was the American Vice-Council in Cape Town at the time of the Jameson Raid. The property was Type of site: House Current use: Residential. In 1901 Clifford Hume Knight bought this property and built the house. It was bought in 1939 by Princess Ida Labia. The large house is reminiscent of a Venetian "palazzo" and is in the neo-Renaissance style.
9/2/081/0080	Dunearn, Boulders, Simonstown			Simonstown			Upload Photo
9/2/081/0081	The Old Homestead, Kommetjie Road, Sunnydale, Simonstown District	Type of site: House Current use: Residential.	Cape Town, Fish Hoek	Simonstown	Provincial Heritage Site	34°08′01″S 18°24′55″E	Type of site: House Current use: Residential.
9/2/081/0082	Conservation areas, Muizenberg, St James and Kalk Bay, Cape Town			Simonstown			Upload Photo
9/2/081/0083	4 Wilfred Road, Simonstown			Simonstown		34°11′36″S 18°25′36″E	Upload Photo
9/2/081/0084	Sandown-on-Sea, Muizenberg, Cape Town			Simonstown			Upload Photo
9/2/081/0085	Shell midden and Rock shelter, Cairn Steps, Glencairn, Simonstown			Simonstown			Upload Photo
9/2/081/0087	Smitswinkel Bay Cave, Cape of Good Hope Nature Reserve, Simonstown			Simonstown			Upload Photo
9/2/081/0088	The Rectory, Runciman Drive, Simonstown			Simonstown			Upload Photo
9/2/081/0089	Weltevreden, 156 Main Road, Lakeside Simonstown District			Simonstown		34°05′35″S 18°27′49″E	Upload Photo
9/2/081/0090	Fish Hoek Extension 7 Zone C, Simonstown District			Simonstown			Upload Photo
9/2/081/0091	ST JAMES LOCAL AREA			Simonstown			Upload Photo
9/2/081/0092	Froggy Pond Shell Middens, Simonstown Dist			Simonstown			Upload Photo
9/2/081/0093	Military Graves, St Judes Catholic Church, Simonstown			Simonstown		34°11′38″S 18°26′15″E	Upload Photo
9/2/081/0094	Klein Vishoek, Simonstown District			Simonstown			Upload Photo
