= 1846 in South Africa =

- Decades: 1820s; 1830s; 1840s; 1850s; 1860s
- See also: List of years in South Africa

The following lists events that happened during 1846 in South Africa.

== Events ==
- Xhosas clash with the white settlers on the Cape Colony's eastern frontier starting the 7th Cape Frontier War, this war was also known as the War of the Axe.
- The Voortrekkers establish Bloemfontein.
- Approximately 103 settlers start arriving in Port Elizabeth from war-torn Buenos Aires, Argentina.
- Locations Commission established by Chief Justice Cloete & Sir Theophilus Shepstone to explore racial segregation in Natal.
- Sir Theophilus Shepstone implements a system where hereditary chiefs manage locations.

== Births ==
- 26 March - Christoffel Cornelis Froneman, an Orange Free State commander and founder of the town Marquard, is born
- 28 June – Willem Eduard Bok, politician, (d. 1904)
