= Springbox =

Springbox may refer to:

- Springbox (company), an interactive services agency.
- Spring box, a structure engineered to make optimum use of a natural spring.

== See also ==
- Springbok (disambiguation)
