= 1851 in South Africa =

- Decades: 1830s; 1840s; 1850s; 1860s; 1870s
- See also: List of years in South Africa

The following lists events that happened during 1851 in South Africa.

== Events ==
- Xhosas clash with the white settlers on the Cape Colonys eastern boundary starting the 8th Cape Frontier War and ends in 1853 in South Africa
- Sugar is first produced from cane in Natal

== Deaths ==
- 27 August - John Philip, a London Missionary Society's missionary to South Africa, dies at age of 76 at Hankey in the Cape Colony
