= 1842 in South Africa =

- Decades: 1820s; 1830s; 1840s; 1850s; 1860s
- See also: List of years in South Africa

The following lists events that happened during 1842 in South Africa.

== Events ==
- War breaks out between the British and the Boers in Natal in the Battle of Congella.
- The Waterloo is wrecked in Table Bay with great loss of life.
- Cape Governor George Napier issues a proclamation against Boer incursions into Basotho and Griqua territories after appeals from Adam Kok III and Dr. John Philip.
- A severe drought in the Eastern Cape Colony leads to cattle theft by settlers and AmaXhosa, weakening the Stockenström's 1836 treaty system.
