= 1860 in South Africa =

- Decades: 1840s; 1850s; 1860s; 1870s; 1880s
- See also: List of years in South Africa

The following lists events that happened during 1860 in South Africa.

== Incumbents ==
- Governor of the Cape of Good Hope and High Commissioner for Southern Africa: Sir George Grey.
- Lieutenant-governor of the Colony of Natal: John Scott.
- State President of the Orange Free State:
  - Esaias Reynier Snijman (acting until 7 February).
  - Marthinus Wessel Pretorius (from 8 February).
- President of the Executive Council of the South African Republic:
  - Marthinus Wessel Pretorius (until 14 September).
  - Johannes Hermanus Grobler (acting from 15 September until 5 December).
  - Stephanus Schoeman (acting from 6 December).

== Events ==
February

- 8 – Marthinus Wessel Pretorius becomes State President of the Orange Free State.

May

- 1 – The seat of the South African Republic (ZAR) government is officially transferred from Potchefstroom to Pretoria.
- 4 – The Orange Free State signs a peace treaty with Moshoeshoe I at Wittebergen, near Winburg, ending the first Basuto War.

June

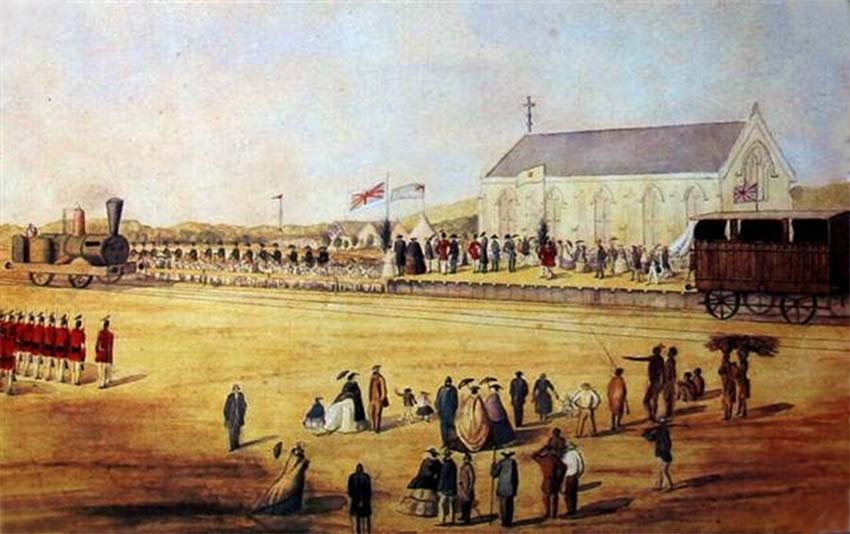
Official Opening of the Natal Railway Company

- 26 – The Natal Railway Company officially opens the first revenue-earning railway line in South Africa, a 2 miles (3.2 kilometres) line from Market Square in Durban to the newly built Point station at Durban Harbour.

September

- 15 – Johannes Hermanus Grobler becomes acting President of the Executive Council of the South African Republic.
- 17 – The Alfred Dock in Table Bay, Cape Town is officially opened by sixteen-year-old Prince Alfred, second son of Queen Victoria.

December

- 6 – Stephanus Schoeman unconstitutionally ousts J.H. Grobler as acting President of the Executive Council of the South African Republic.

Unknown date

- The first indenture of Indian workers arrive in Natal to work in the sugar industry.
- The first telegraph service in South Africa starts operating between Cape Town and Simonstown.
- The penny post is started in Cape Town.

== Births ==
- 29 April – John Robinson Royston, soldier and farmer, is born in Durban.

== Railways ==
=== Railway lines opened ===
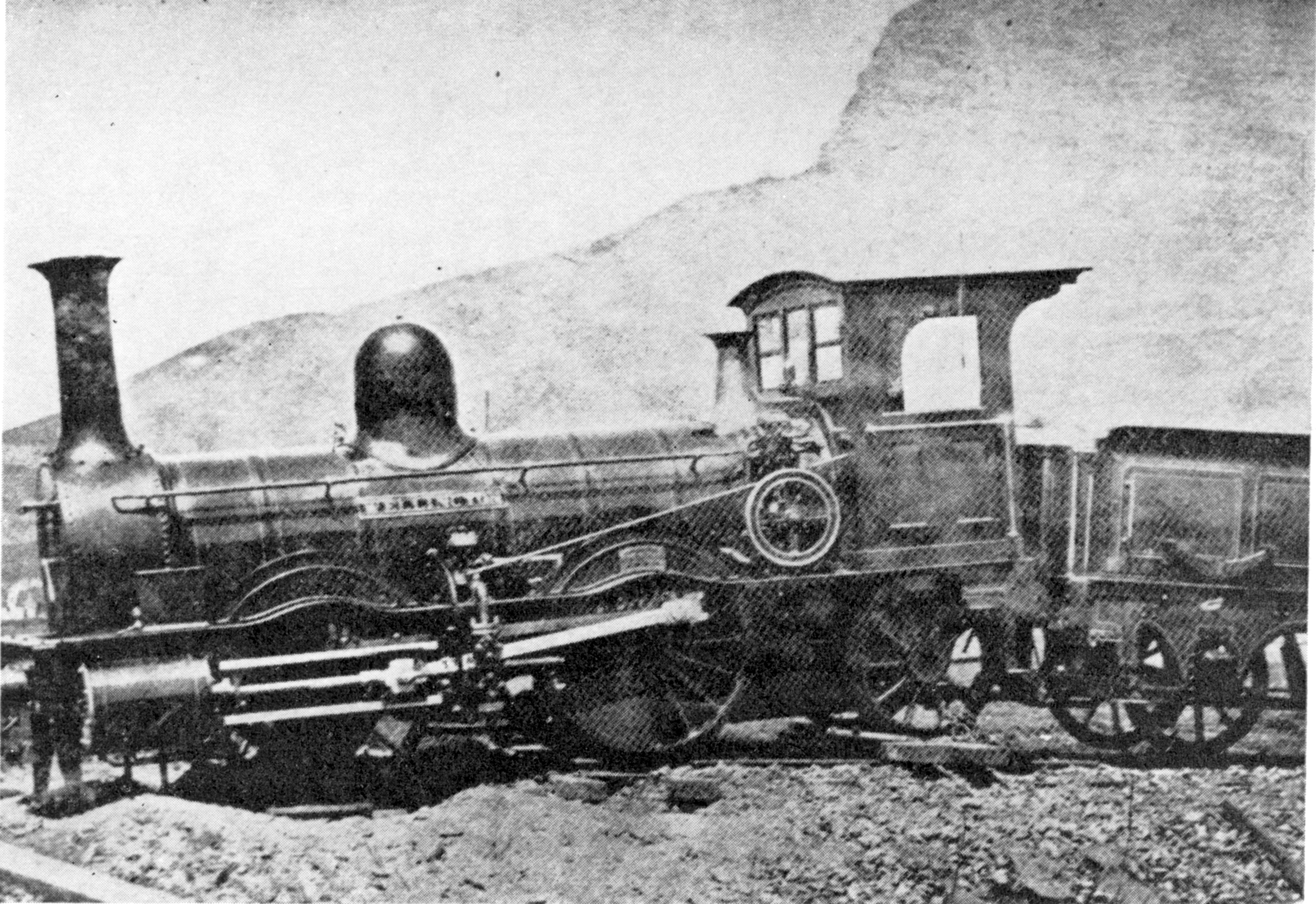
Cape Town Railway & Dock 0-4-2

- 26 June – Natal – Durban to Point, 2 miles (3.2 kilometres).

=== Locomotives ===
- 20 March – The Cape Town Railway and Dock Company takes delivery of eight broad gauge 0-4-2 tender locomotives for service on the Cape Town-Wellington line, which is still under construction.
- 13 May – The Natal Railway Company's first locomotive, the broad gauge engine "Natal", is landed at Durban.
