= 1845 in South Africa =

- Decades: 1820s; 1830s; 1840s; 1850s; 1860s
- See also: List of years in South Africa

The following lists events that happened during 1845 in South Africa.

== Events ==
- The road from Cape Town to Stellenbosch through the Maitland area is completed
- The Voortrekker settlement of Ohrigstad is founded
- Natal becomes an autonomous district of Cape Colony
- The Berlin Mission Society establishes a mission station at Pniel
