= 1854 in South Africa =

- Decades: 1830s; 1840s; 1850s; 1860s; 1870s
- See also: List of years in South Africa

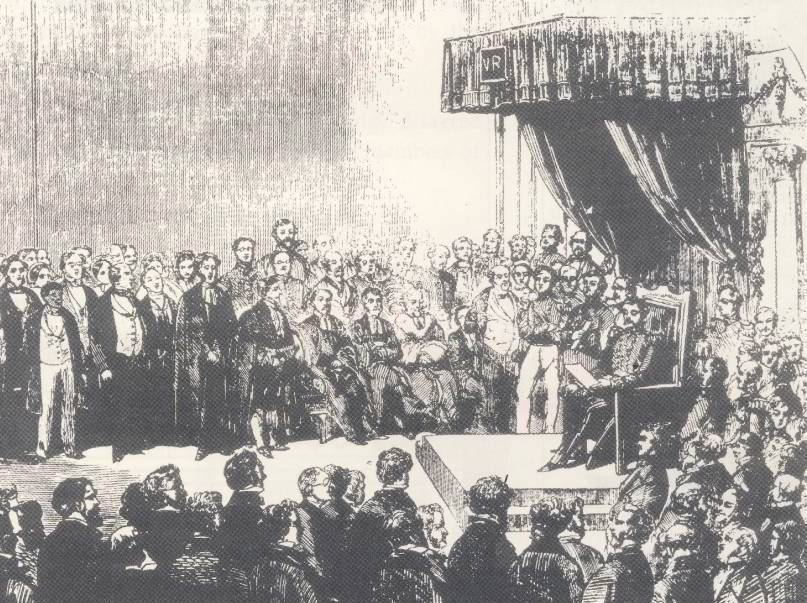
1854 opening of the 1st Cape Parliament

The following lists events that happened during 1854 in South Africa.

== Events ==
- 23 February - The Orange Free State Republic is established with the signing of the Bloemfontein Convention
- 15 October - U.G. Lauts appointed consul of the Orange Free State in the Netherlands
- The Cape Colony elects its first parliament
- Sir George Grey, Portuguese-born British, is appointed Governor of the Cape
- The Boers lead a punitive campaign against the Sumayela Ndebele at Makapansgat.
