= 1850 in South Africa =

- Decades: 1830s; 1840s; 1850s; 1860s; 1870s
- See also: List of years in South Africa

The following lists events that happened during 1850 in South Africa.

== Events ==
- Wesleyan settlers arrive in Natal
- The "Childe Herold", a British ship en route from Bombay to London is wrecked off Dassen Island, Cape Colony
- 23 April — A mass meeting is held in Cape Town to petition Queen Victoria to grant the Cape Colony a government

== Births ==
- 9 April — Julius Charles Wernher, financier and mine magnate
- 23 April — Andries Jacobus Bester, the Boer commandant of the Bethlehem commando, is born in Bloemfontein
- 4 September 1850 - Abraham Fischer, Prime Minister of the Orange River Colony. (d. 1913)
