= 1843 in South Africa =

- Decades: 1820s; 1830s; 1840s; 1850s; 1860s
- See also: List of years in South Africa

The following lists events that happened during 1843 in South Africa.

== Events ==
- British forces under Governor Sir George Napier annex the Republic of Natalia, making it a British colony after a failed Voortrekker siege.
- The Volksraad of Natal agrees to the terms of British annexation as a Crown Colony, resulting in a Trek of Boers to territories outside Natal.
- Mpande cedes St Lucia Bay to the British and signs a treaty restricting the AmaZulu to land south of the Tugela River.
- Merino sheep farming expands in the Cape Colony, leading to conflicts as farmers seek grazing land belonging to the AmaXhosa.
- Boer farmers and raiding Griqua groups threaten Moshoeshoe’s kingdom. Napier supports Moshoeshoe, signing a treaty defining Basotho land between the Orange and Caledon Rivers, with Moshoeshoe receiving £75 to maintain order.
- Cape Governor Napier signs an agreement with Griqua leader Adam Kok III to maintain order in his territory for an annual salary of £100, although no territorial boundaries are defined.
