= 1844 in South Africa =

- Decades: 1820s; 1830s; 1840s; 1850s; 1860s
- See also: List of years in South Africa

The following lists events that happened during 1844 in South Africa.

== Events ==
- Voortrekkers from Natal cross back over the Drakensberg Mountains and settle at Potchefstroom.
- The settlement of Victoria West is established
- The Voortrekker leader Hendrik Potgieter settles at Delagoa Bay, Mozambique
- Sir Peregrine Maitland becomes Governor of the Cape Colony.
- Fighting erupts between Boers and the Griqua as Boers reject the authority of Adam Kok III.

== Births ==
- 5 October - Francis William Reitz, South African lawyer, politician, and statesman, president of the Orange Free State born in Swellendam, Cape Colony.
