= 1855 in South Africa =

- Decades: 1830s; 1840s; 1850s; 1860s; 1870s
- See also: List of years in South Africa

The following lists events that happened during 1855 in South Africa.

== Events ==
- Pretoria is established
- 20 Irish miners arrive to work in the Namaqualand copper mines
- 27 August - Jacobus Boshoff becomes the 2nd president of the Orange Free State

== Births ==
- 24 March - Olive Schreiner, author and feminist
