= 1848 in South Africa =

- Decades: 1820s; 1830s; 1840s; 1850s; 1860s
- See also: List of years in South Africa

The following lists events that happened during 1848 in South Africa.

== Events ==
- Approximately 163 German settlers, known as the Bergthiel Settlers, arrive in Natal.
- Voortrekkers settle across the Vaal River.
- At the Battle of Boomplaats, Voortrekker leader Andries Pretorius leads a commando against British rule but is defeated with Griqua assistance.
- The Reverend Isaac Hughes founds a mission station on the farm Backhouse, near the confluence of the Orange and Vaal rivers, which later develops into the town Douglas.
- Cape Governor Sir Harry Smith annexes Transorangia, land north of the Orange River, creating the Orange River Sovereignty.
- Sir Harry Smith orders Major Henry Warden to set boundaries between black and white communities north of the Caledon River, favoring the white settlers.
- Sir Harry Smith proposes vagrancy laws to force settlers into labor, but local resistance forces him to abandon the plan.

== Deaths ==
- 4 June - Christina Pretorius, wife of Voortrekker leader Andries Pretorius, dies near present-day Bela Bela
- 23 November - Sir John Barrow, 1st Baronet, early explorer of Southern Africa, writer, and English Statesman, dies in London
