= 1858 in South Africa =

- Decades: 1830s; 1840s; 1850s; 1860s; 1870s
- See also: List of years in South Africa

The following lists events that happened during 1858 in South Africa.

== Incumbents ==
- Governor of the Cape of Good Hope and High Commissioner for Southern Africa: Sir George Grey.
- Lieutenant-governor of the Colony of Natal: John Scott.
- State President of the Orange Free State: Jacobus Nicolaas Boshoff.
- President of the Executive Council of the South African Republic: Marthinus Wessel Pretorius.

== Events ==
March

- 19 – Senekal's War breaks out between the Orange Free State and the Basotho tribe.

== Births ==
- 6 December – Ernest Edward Galpin, botanist and banker. (d. 1941)

== Deaths ==
- Cornelius Kok II, leader of the Griqua people. (b. 1778)
