= 1856 in South Africa =

- Decades: 1830s; 1840s; 1850s; 1860s; 1870s
- See also: List of years in South Africa

The following lists events that happened during 1856 in South Africa.

== Incumbents ==
Governor of the Cape Colony - Sir George Grey

Monarch - Queen Alexandrina Victoria

== Events ==
- The Cape Government promulgates the Masters and Servants Act, favoring white settlers over black labourers.
- Approximately 3000 Crimean War veterans (German Legionnaires) settled in Kaffraria, later joined by 2700 German civilians.
- New Natal legislature sets rules for importing Indian indentured labor to meet the demands of sugar planters.
- February - U.G. Lauts dismissed as consul of the Orange Free State in the Netherlands
- 15 July - Natal is made a separate British colony, after being part of Cape colony since 1843. Theophilus Shepstone becomes Secretary for Native Affairs.
- 13 October - State President Boshoff of the Orange Free State lays the foundation stone of Grey College in Bloemfontein
- 17 December - The Boer republic of Lydenburg is established
- The Battle of Ndondakusuka: Mpande's sons Mbuyazwe and Cetshwayo battle for kingship of Zululand. Cetshwayo is successful, and 23,000 Zulu die.
- The AmaXhosa, devastated by land loss and disease, follow Nongqawuse’s prophecy, leading to mass cattle slaughter, famine, and near destruction of their society.

== Births ==
- 26 March - Christiaan Willem Hendrik van der Post, member of the Orange Free State Volksraad and poet, is born in Leiden, Netherlands
