= 1861 in South Africa =

- Decades: 1840s; 1850s; 1860s; 1870s; 1880s
- See also: List of years in South Africa

The following lists events that happened during 1861 in South Africa.

== Incumbents ==
- Governor of the Cape of Good Hope and High Commissioner for Southern Africa:
  - Sir George Grey (until 14 August).
  - Sir Robert Wynyard (acting from 15 August).
- Lieutenant-governor of the Colony of Natal: John Scott.
- State President of the Orange Free State: Marthinus Wessel Pretorius.
- President of the Executive Council of the South African Republic: Stephanus Schoeman (acting).

== Events ==
August

- 15 – Sir Robert Wynyard becomes acting Governor of the Cape of Good Hope and High Commissioner for Southern Africa.

September

- 16 – Roman Rock Lighthouse at the entrance to Simon's Town begins operating after taking 4 years to build.

== Births ==
- 10 November – Robert T. A. Innes, astronomer and secretary-accountant at the Cape observatory. (d. 1933)
- Sefako Mapogo Makgatho, the second African National Congress president. (d. 1951)
