= Charles Etienne Boniface =

- Born: 2 February 1787; Paris, France
- Died: 10 December 1853 (aged 66); Durban, Colony of Natal
- Known for: Book writing, teaching music, playwriting and journalism

Charles Etienne Boniface (2 February 1787 – 10 December 1853) was an early nineteenth century music teacher, playwright, journalist and polyglot who was born in France, but who spent his adult life in Southern Africa. His writings and compositions are amongst the earliest publications of what was then the Cape Colony.

== Early years ==
Boniface was born in Paris in 1787, two years before the outbreak of the French Revolution. At the age of twelve he had a grounding in French, Spanish, Italian, Portuguese, Latin, Greek, had written short dramas in the style of Molière, played the guitar and had learned to dance.

In 1798 his father, who was a prison governor was banished from France on suspicion of helping Sir Sidney Smith to escape back to England. Smith assisted the Boniface family to settle in the Seychelles, a former French colony which, since the beginning of the French Revolution, was effectively under the control of its own assembly. Boniface enrolled in as a cadet in the Royal Navy. In 1806 Cape Colony passed back into British hands and the following year Boniface made his way there via Mozambique on board a Portuguese slave ship.

== Cape Town ==
In Cape Town, Boniface learnt German, Dutch and English and set himself up as a language and music teacher, particularly playing the French and Spanish guitars. He was the first person in the Cape Colony known to have noted the local music.

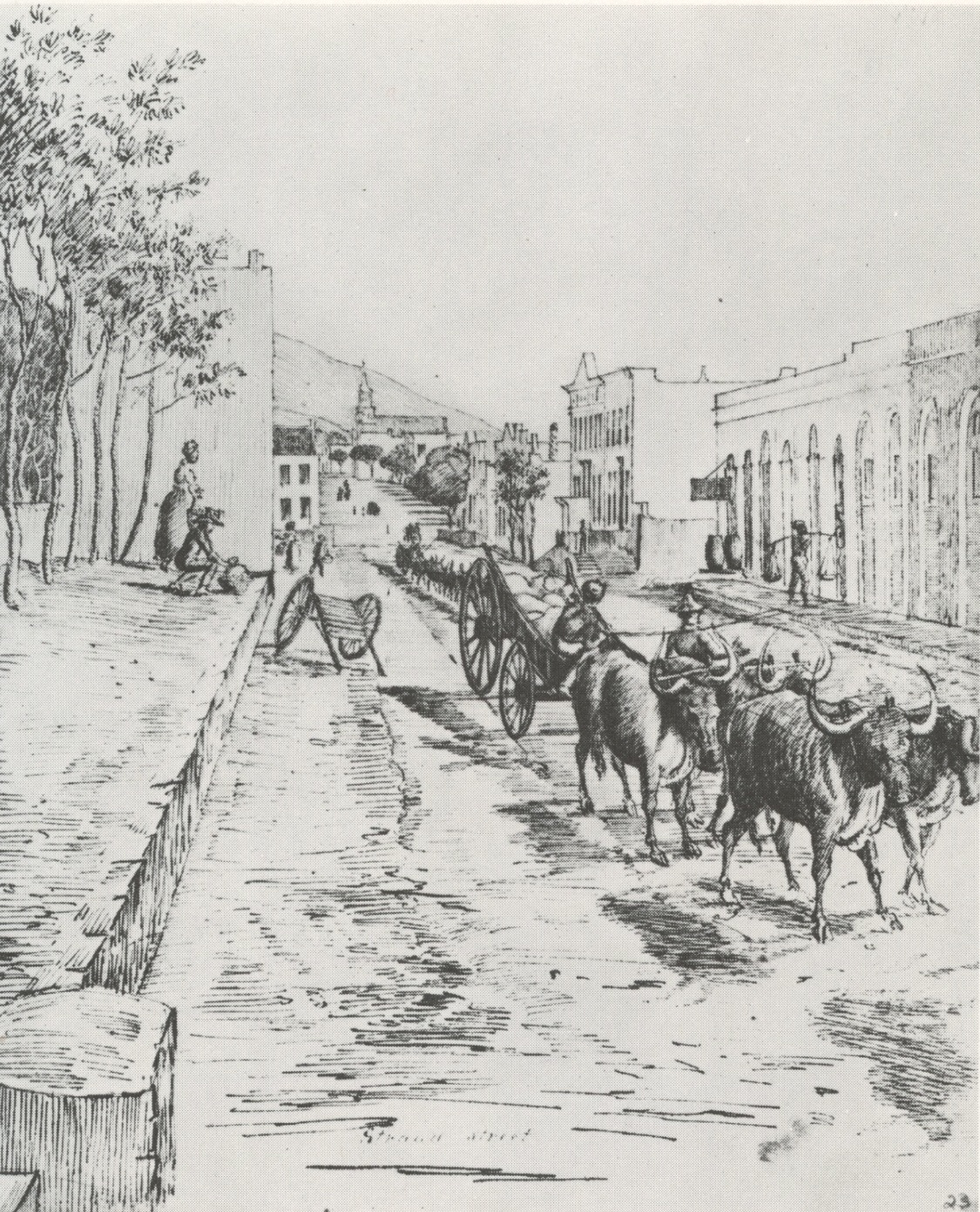
Strand Street, Cape Town during Boniface's time

In the early nineteenth century the theatre was one of the principal leisure activities in the Cape and Boniface, writing in English, Dutch (with the first words of Afrikaans to appear on the South African stage) and his native French was one of the most popular dramatists in the colony. He wrote a series of plays including L'Enragé (1807) which, in 1823 was translated into Dutch by Joseph Suasso de Lima with the title De Dolzinnige of De Gewaande Dolleman, in 1813 a ballet-pantomime Het beleg en het Nemen van Troyen (The siege and taking of Troy) and in 1826 he translated Molière's Le Bourgeois gentilhomme (The Bourgeois Gentleman) into Dutch under the title De Burger Edelman.

In 1828 he became a sworn translator in the Cape Supreme Court.

His French-language writings included Relation du naufrage de l'Eole, published in 1829—a record of the journey made by the survivors of the Eole, a French ship that was wrecked off the coast of what was then known as "British Kaffraria" en route to Réunion from France earlier that year. He intended to translate it into English under the title Narrative of the Shipwreck of the Eole but never completed his translation though a translation and commentary was published in 2012.

In 1830, three years after he had been declared bankrupt following a libel suite, he became the first editor of the Dutch-language newspaper De Zuid-Afrikaan, a post that he held for six months. The Zuid-Afrikaan itself continued for 100 years. While editor he took a pride in stressing the unity between the Dutch and the English cultures.

Amongst his notable works with a local flavour was De Nieuwe Ridderorde of De Temperantisten, (The New Knighthood or the Temperance Societies) published in 1832. The play satirised the wave of British puritanism and temperance of the day and in particular John Philip of the London Missionary Society who had secured equality of all free people within the Colony. Although written in Dutch, the local patois (which was later to evolve into Afrikaans) was used by the appropriate characters. This is one of the first pieces of literature in which an Afrikaans-like language appeared.

Between 1837 and 1838 Boniface was editor of the bilingual weekly magazine De Meditator published by Cornelius Moll. The magazine, which ceased publication in 1838 when Boniface fell out with Moll, took a sympathetic view towards the Voortrekkers.

In 1817 Boniface married Maria Geertruida Heyneman and in the following year their first child Alexis was born. Alexis died in 1828 aged ten and Maria died in 1835 at the age of thirty-nine. Between 1838 and 1843 Boniface had three daughters from a relationship with a freed Mozambique slave Constantia Dorothea le Mordant.

== Later years in Natal ==
In November 1843 Boniface obtained permission from the Volksraad of the Natalia Republic to establish a newspaper. He left the Cape Colony to avoid a libel suite and moved to Pietermaritzburg. By the time the paper, named De Natalier, was launched on 5 April 1844 the republic had passed into British control and had been renamed the "Colony of Natal". De Natalier had a circulation of about forty copies per week and soon succumbed to financial pressure resulting from a libel suite. The gap that it left in the market was taken by The Natal Witness, which was launched by Boniface's former colleague Moll in 1846.

His continued association with le Mordant who had followed him to Natal with their three daughters brought contempt from the colonial population.

== Death ==
On 10 December 1853 while in Durban Boniface committed suicide by taking laudanum. He was 66 years old.
