= 1849 in South Africa =

- Decades: 1820s; 1830s; 1840s; 1850s; 1860s
- See also: List of years in South Africa

The following lists events that happened during 1849 in South Africa.

== Events ==
- Diocesan College (Bishops) is founded in Rondebosch, Cape Town by Robert Gray (bishop of Cape Town).
- The British propose to ship convicts to the Cape Colony, but the Cape population strongly object during the Convict Crisis of 1849. The proposal is eventually squashed with the help of British MP Charles Bowyer Adderley and Heerengracht in Cape Town is changed to Adderley Street in honour.
- The first Jewish Congregation is founded in Cape Town.
- The Byrne Settlers start arriving in Natal.
- Cape colonial governor Sir Harry Smith imposes authoritarian rule over the western AmaXhosa after the War of the Axe.
- Military rule introduced in British Kaffraria, with harsh punishments for minor crimes, cattle impounding, and indentured labour of black youths to white farmers.
