= 1847 in South Africa =

- Decades: 1820s; 1830s; 1840s; 1850s; 1860s
- See also: List of years in South Africa

The following lists events that happened during 1847 in South Africa.

== Events ==
- The Montagu Pass is opened.
- Sugar cane plantations are started in Natal.
- The settlement of East London is established.
- Robert Gray is ordained as the first Bishop of Cape Town in Westminster Abbey, London.
- The AmaXhosa Resistance rejects British peace terms, but avoids direct warfare. The British then destroy homes, cattle, and crops to force a surrender.
- Harry Smith is appointed as Cape Governor, and begins to pursue an aggressive expansion policy.
- The British Kaffraria Colony is established on AmaXhosa land, and the AmaXhosa are made British subjects.
- Harry Smith overturns Maitland's agreement, seizing rental payments for the Crown and allowing white settlement on Griqua land.
- Harry Smith claims land between the Orange and Vaal rivers for Britain but restricts white settlement, except in Griqualand.
- With British support, Moshoeshoe unifies Basotho chiefdoms and secures protection from white settlers.

== Births ==
- 9 July - Henrietta Stockdale, pioneer of nursing in the Cape Colony, is born in Nottinghamshire, England
- 22 October - Jacobus Herculaas de la Rey, Boer general, is born near Winburg, Free State
