= Jan Ernst Abraham Volschenk =

South African artist (1853 - 1936)

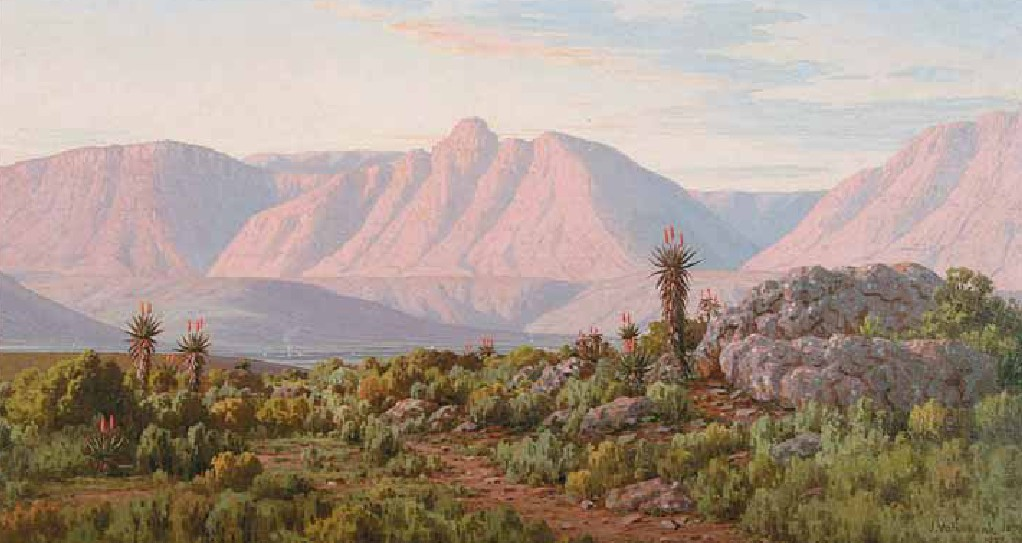
Evening Glow: The Langebergen at Riversdale (Mozambiquerskop) (1927)

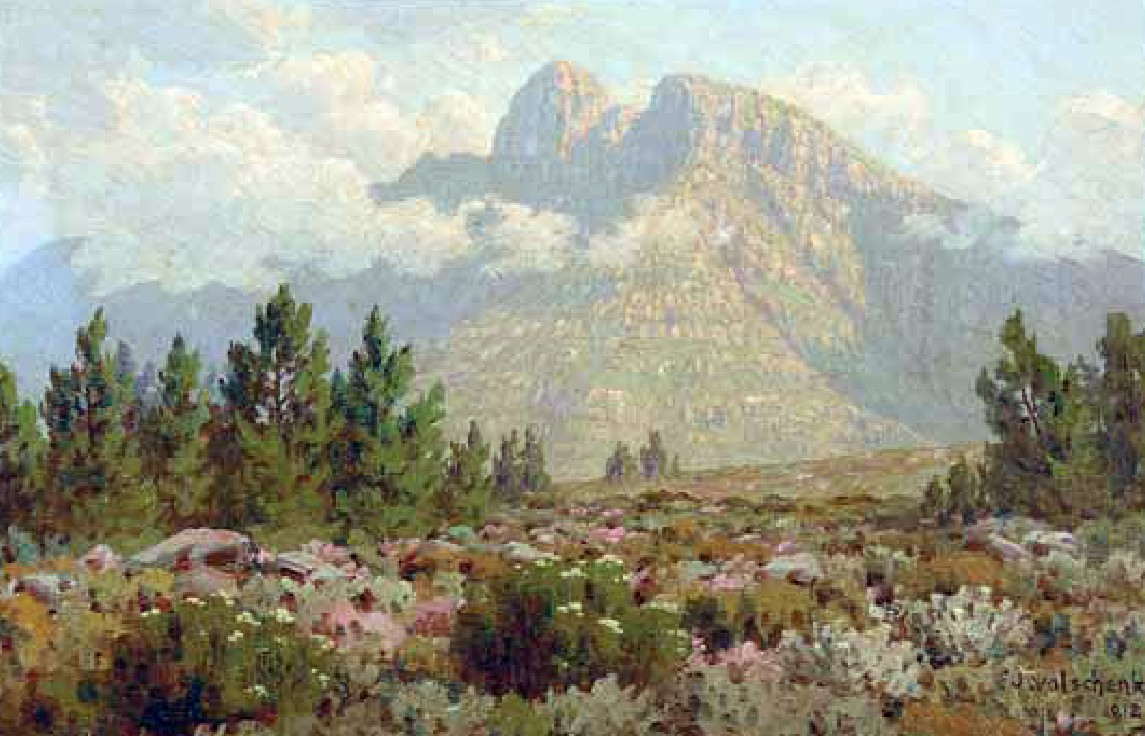
Mountain Cypresses, Heather (1918)

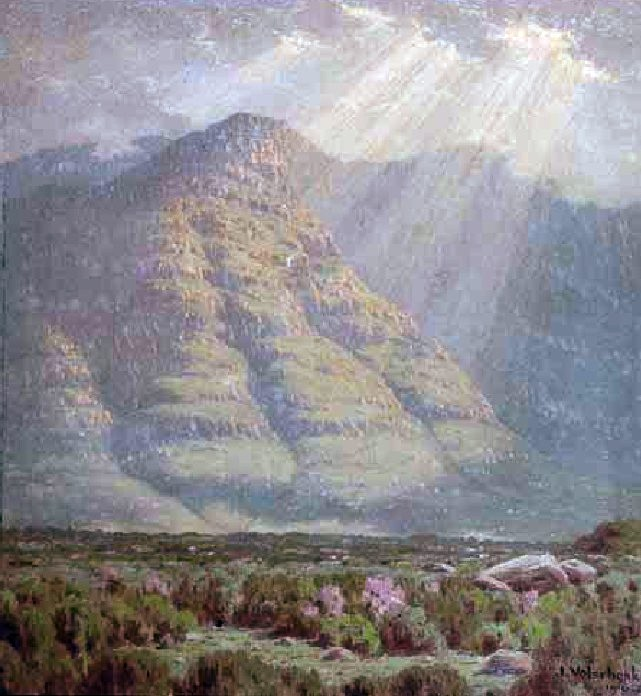
Hazy Morning in the Langeberg (1916)

Jan Ernst Abraham Volschenk (20 August 1853 Riversdale - 22 January 1936 Riversdale), was a South African painter, noted for his majestic landscapes of the Langeberg Range in the Western Cape Province.

Born of Dutch parents on the farm Melkhoutskraal, Volschenk started painting when still a child and was largely self-taught. James Reitz, the Government Land Surveyor, saw some of his drawings and suggested that his brother Gysbert, a Riversdale lawyer, take an interest. He eventually joined the firm of Reitz & Versfeld as a bookkeeper. At 51 years of age he gave up his office job and devoted all his time to his oils and canvases. His home district around Riversdale and the Langeberg, was his inspiration and subject matter, and he became a master of the subtle colours and tones of the Karoo mountains.

Volschenk's keen powers of observation spilled over into natural history - he amassed a collection of more than 4 000 beetle specimens.

When 45 years old, Volschenk married another Riversdale resident, Helen Smalberger, and they produced a family of nine daughters. Of these, Vera, the eldest, followed in her father's footsteps and painted in the same genre.

== Timeline ==
- 1879 Exhibits four works in Cape Town
- 1893 Accompanies the Reitz family to Europe and is inspired by the art galleries
- 1894 Joins the South African Drawing Club and exhibits with them
- 1899 Marries Helen Smalberger of Riversdale
- 1904 Gives up office work and devotes full attention to painting
- 1936 Suffers a stroke and dies in Riversdale

== Public art collections ==
- South African National Gallery, Cape Town
- Johannesburg Art Gallery
- Pretoria Art Museum
- Durban Art Gallery
- William Humphreys Gallery, Kimberley
- AC White Gallery, Bloemfontein
- Albany Museum, Grahamstown
