= Henry Clifford de Meillon =

South African painter

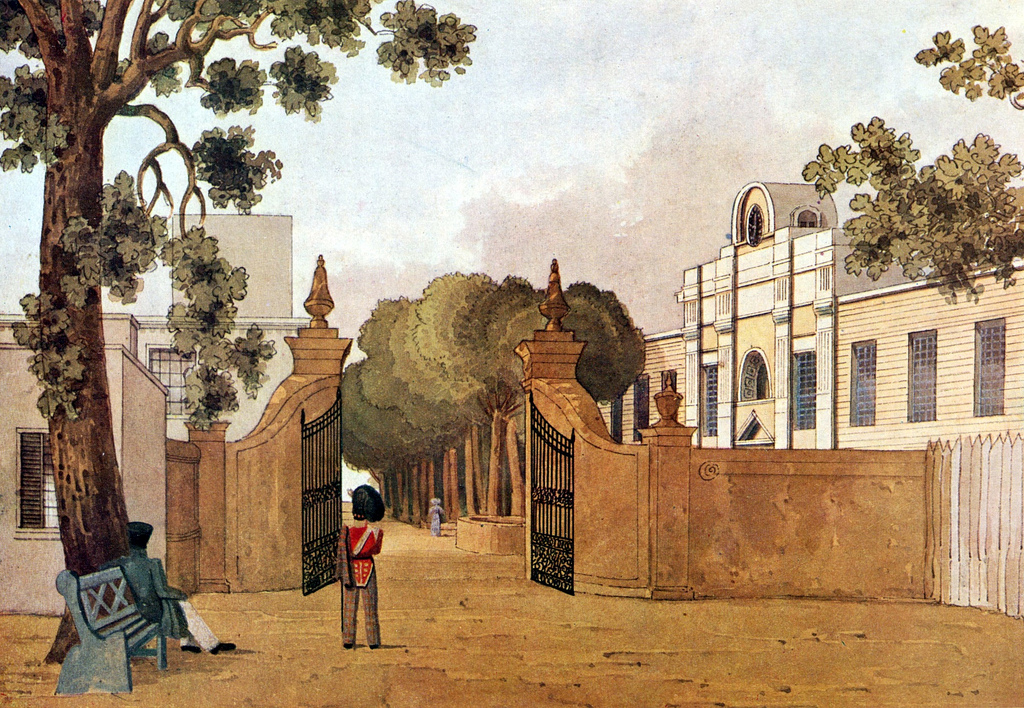
Entrance to the Government Gardens, Cape Town

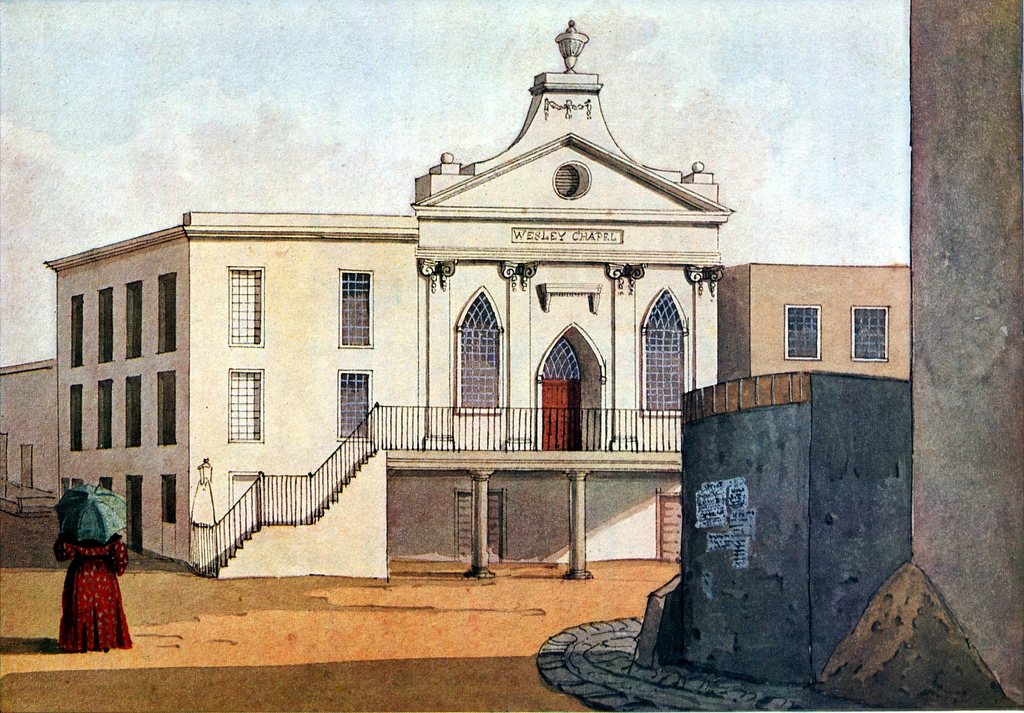
The Wesleyan Chapel, Cape Town

Henry Clifford De Meillon (c1800 London – 31 May 1859 Port Elizabeth) was an English-born South African painter noted for his watercolour images of Cape Town in the 1800s. His parents were Henry De Meillon (place and years of birth and death are unknown) and Anna Sophia Watts (28 November 1776 – 15 June 1863 London).

Almost nothing is known about De Meillon's early life, except that his family were from the village of Meillon. This has also not been confirmed. His arrival at Simonstown in the Cape in April or May 1823 was as a result of malaria contracted in Moçambique while serving as second master under Captain Owen aboard HMS Leven, together with the brig Barracouta, 'an expedition for surveying the Eastern Coasts of Africa'. When the expedition returned in 1826, with some 300 new charts, detailing some 30,000 miles (48,000 km) of coastline, over half the original crew had succumbed to tropical diseases.

One of the first references to him was on 21 January 1824 when the South African Commercial Advertiser mentioned him as an 'able draughtsman' who had been commissioned to paint the portraits of Pedu and Teysho, two Bechuana chiefs who were visiting Cape Town. These portraits were included as engravings in the traveller George Thompson's (1796–1889) book "Travels and Adventures in Southern Africa" published in 1827.

De Meillon tutored the Cloete children at Groot Constantia from May 1825 until August 1825. He was appointed as English teacher in Swellendam. He married twice – first to a Miss Grobbelaar/Grobler, the marriage producing two sons, and secondly to Barbara Enslin, producing a second large family.

He left the Cape Town area in 1832 and for a while worked as a clerk in Fort Beaufort, and is also recorded in 1842 as being part of the Commissariat in Grahamstown, and working in Port Elizabeth in 1851. It is thought that he died in Port Elizabeth during the 1859 smallpox epidemic, as a result of which his personal effects were burnt.
