= Springbokfontein =

- Location within North West (South African province) Location within South Africa
- Coordinates: 26.338°S 25.609°E
- Country: South Africa
- Province: North West
- District: Ngaka Modiri Molema
- Municipality: Tswaing

Area
  - Total: 1.96 km^{2} (0.76 sq mi)

Population (2001)
  - Total: 2,306
  - Density: 1,180/km^{2} (3,050/sq mi)
- Time zone: UTC+2 (SAST)

Springbokpan is a town in Ngaka Modiri Molema District Municipality in the North West province of South Africa.
