= Roman Rock Lighthouse =

Lighthouse in False Bay, near Simon's Town, South Africa

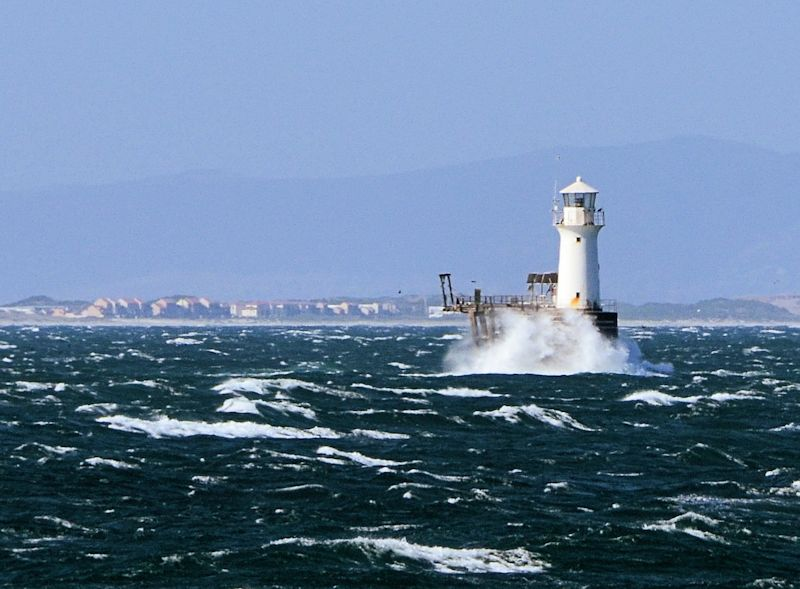
- Location: Simon's Town; Western Cape; South Africa
- Coordinates: 34°10′52.4″S 18°27′36.4″E

Tower
- Constructed: 1861
- Foundation: stone basement
- Construction: cast iron tower
- Automated: 1919
- Height: 14 metres (46 ft)
- Shape: cylindrical tower with balcony and lantern
- Markings: white tower and lantern
- Power source: solar power
- Racon: Q

Light
- First lit: 16 September 1861
- Focal height: 17 metres (56 ft)
- Range: 20 nmi (37 km; 23 mi)
- Characteristic: Fl W 6s.

Roman Rock Lighthouse is a lighthouse in False Bay, near Simon's Town. It is the only lighthouse in South Africa built on a single rock.

The light was first exhibited on 16 September 1861.

The light was electrified in 1992 at the request of the South African Navy.

== History ==
Designed by Alexander Gordon of the British Lighthouse Authority, the lighthouse was a difficult endeavor due to the harsh conditions of the area, with fierce winds and turbulent seas, limited construction to a mere 96 working days annually, stretching the build over four-year. The original lighting mechanism was designed by James De Ville, a London-based lamp manufacturer, and consisted of a revolving platform that carried eight single-wick oil burners set in polished metallic reflectors. These burners made a full rotation every four minutes. John Williams served as the first head lighthouse keeper, overseeing a small team of two other men that rotated shifts every seven days. In 1914 the lighting mechanism was replaced and the tower was no longer staffed by lighthouse keepers, replaced by an acetylene gas cylinders that provided automatic flashes every six seconds. The lighting mechanism was updated again in 1992 to be electrical at the request of the South African Navy.

== See also ==
- List of lighthouses in South Africa
