= Riversdale, South Africa =

Riversdale
- Town
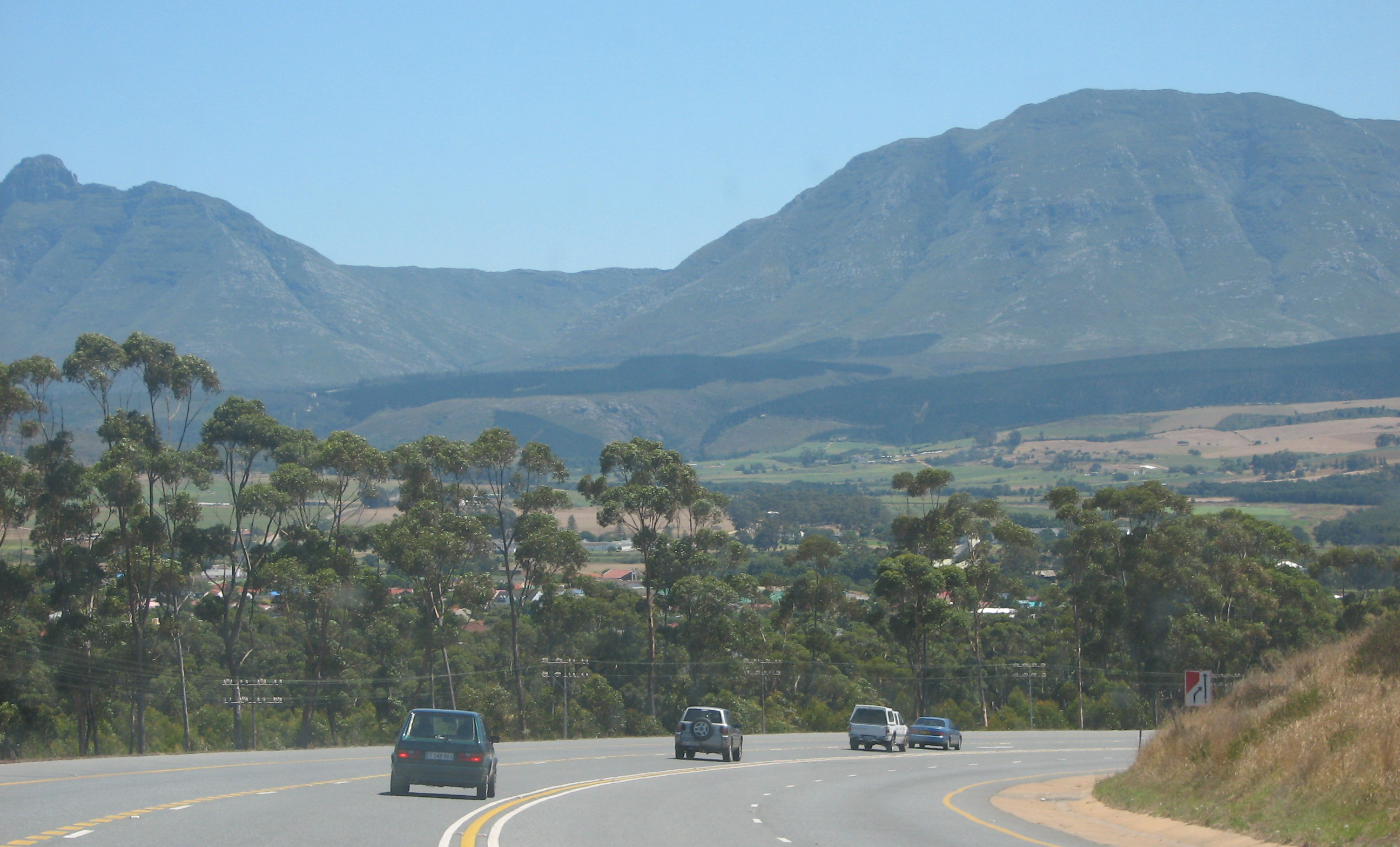
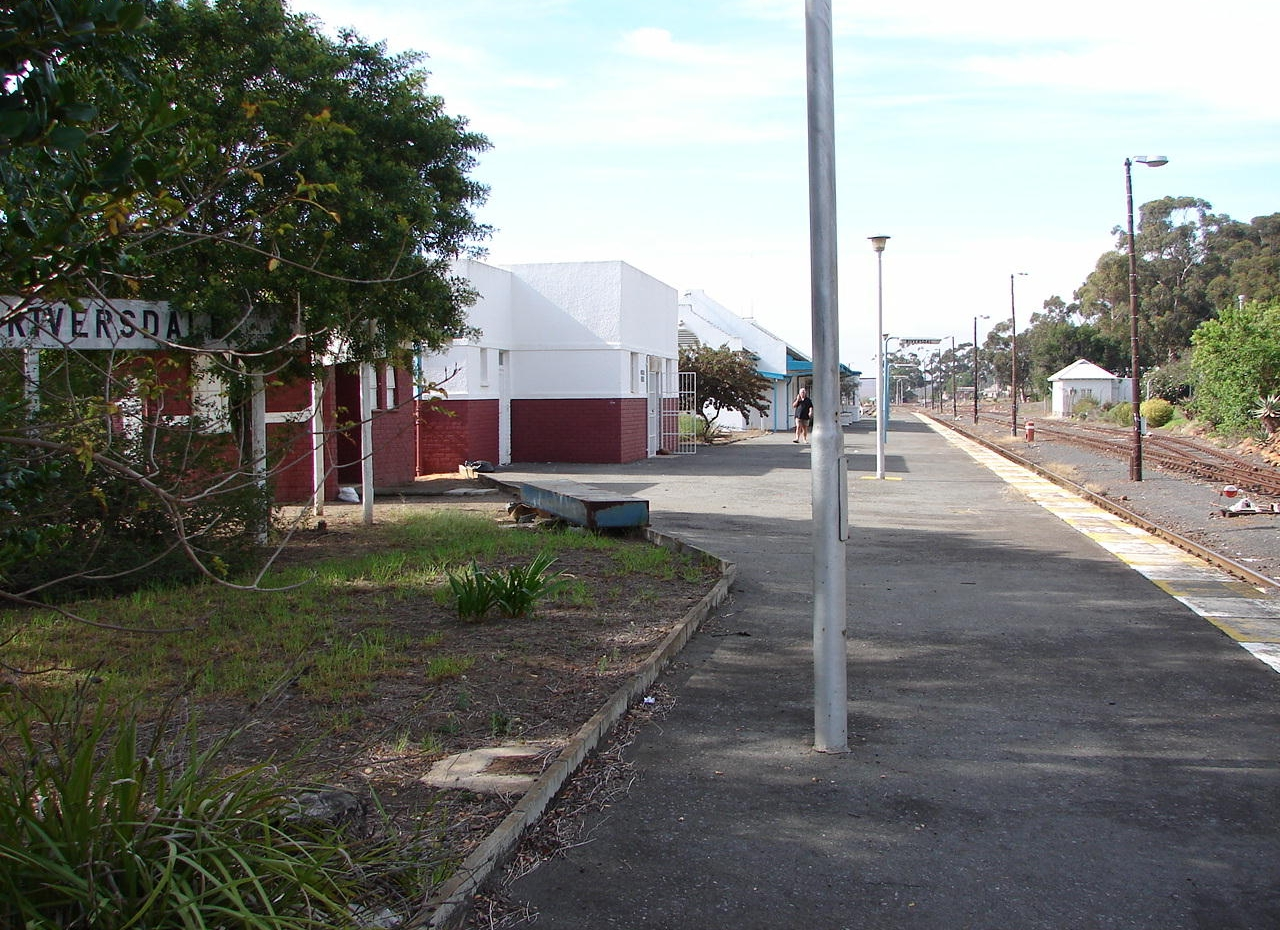
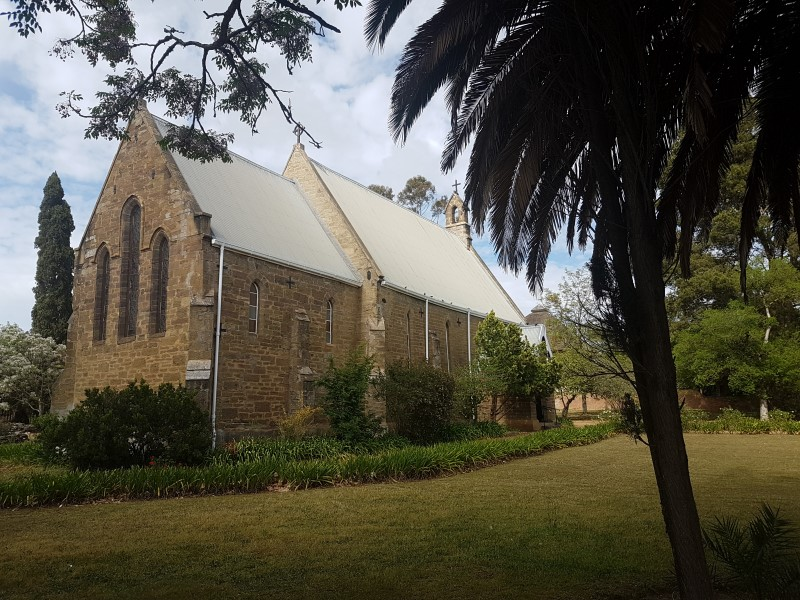
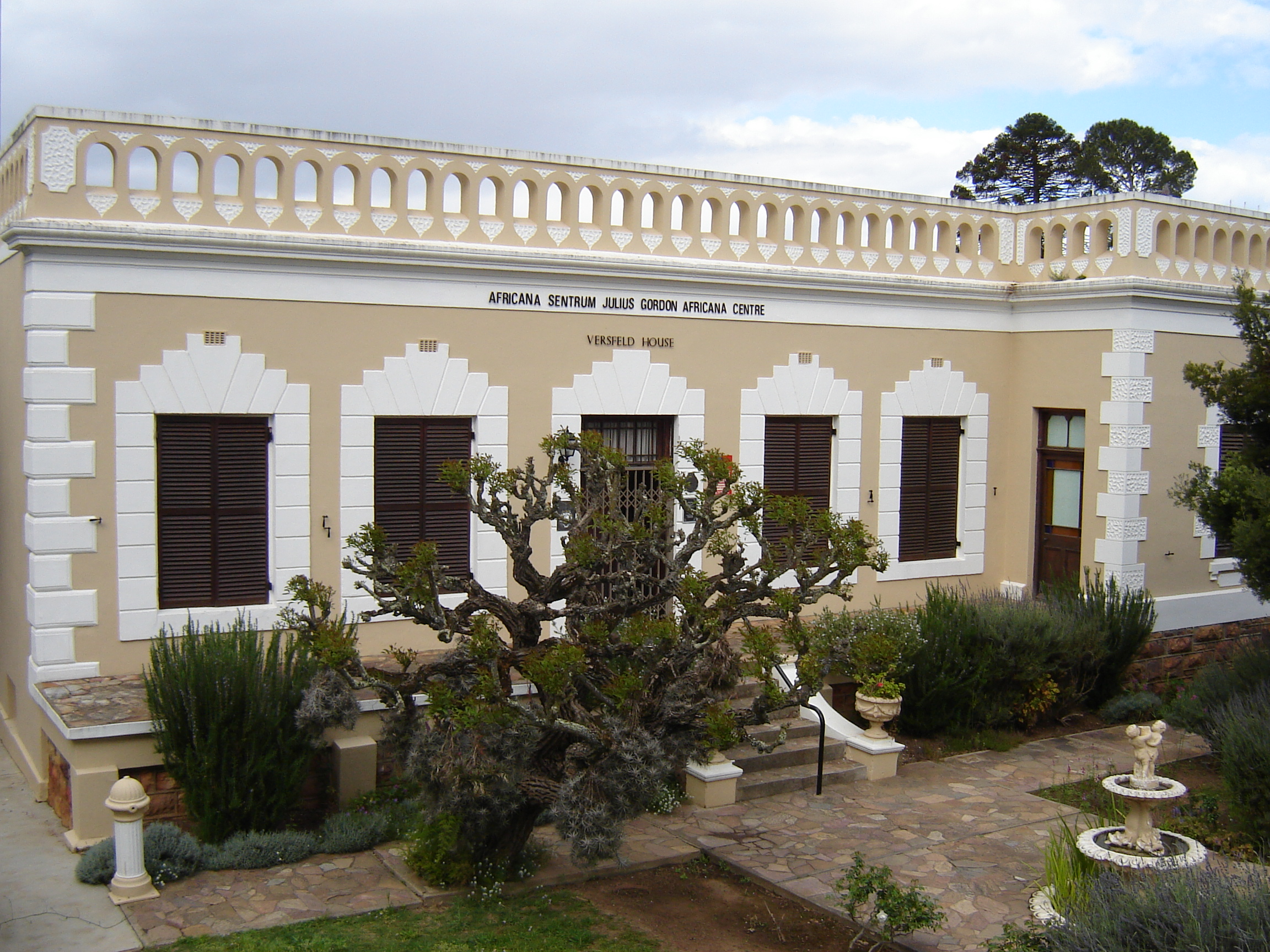
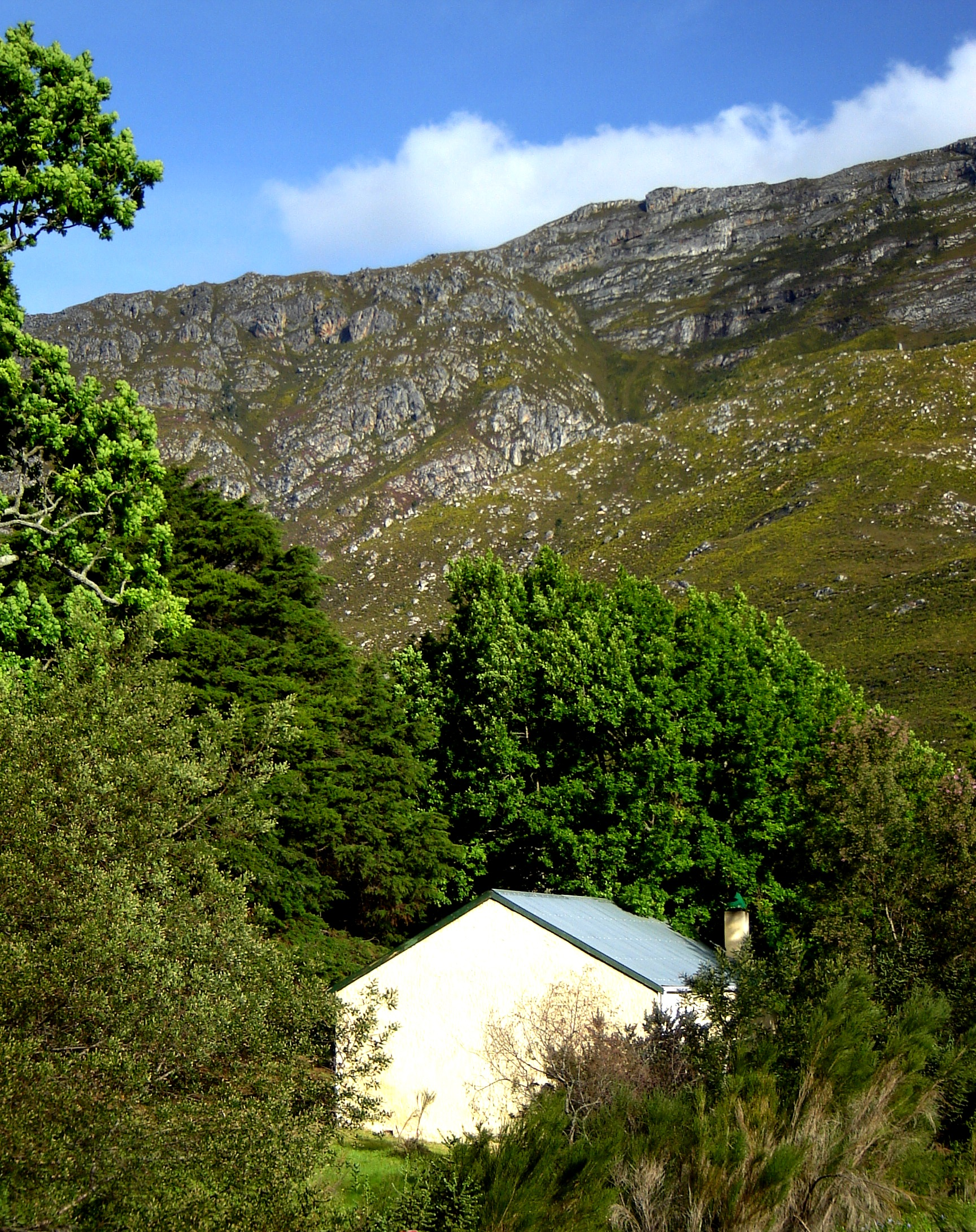
- Clockwise from top: Approaching the town of Riversdale on the N2 highway, St Matthew's Church, Old Tolhouse Garcia Pass, Versveld House, Riversdale Train Station.

- Location within Western Cape Location within South Africa Location within Africa
- Coordinates: 34°05′49″S 21°15′44″E
- Country: South Africa
- Province: Western Cape
- District: Garden Route
- Municipality: Hessequa
- Established: 1838

Government
  - Mayor: Grant Riddles (DA)

Area
  - Total: 100.45 km^{2} (38.78 sq mi)
- Elevation: 110 m (360 ft)

Population (2011)
  - Total: 16,176
  - Density: 161.04/km^{2} (417.08/sq mi)

Racial makeup (2011)
  - Black African: 8.9%
  - Coloured: 75.2%
  - Indian/Asian: 0.3%
  - White: 15.3%
  - Other: 0.3%

First languages (2011)
  - Afrikaans: 92.3%
  - Xhosa: 3.7%
  - English: 2.2%
  - Other: 1.8%
- Time zone: UTC+2 (SAST)
- Postal code (street): 6670
- PO box: 6670
- Area code: 028

Riversdale is a town located along the N2 highway, within the Hessequa region between Cape Town and George on the Agulhas Coastal Plain of the southern Western Cape province of South Africa. It is an agricultural service oriented town, being a hub for shopping and other services for surrounding farming communities, smaller towns, and coastal resorts, like Witsand and Stilbaai. It is located beneath the imposing Langeberg Mountains to the north, with Sleeping Beauty Mountain Peak overlooking the town. The town is home to the second largest collection of Thomas Bowler paintings within South Africa and is also the only town in the country, in which you would find a Ukrainian Museum of Culture. Riversdale links with the Klein Karoo, via the tarred Garcia's Mountain Pass, which offers traditional Karoo landscapes and wide open spaces for motorcyclists.

The Old Jail dates back to the 1800s, and is one of the most visited tourist facilities in town. The Bali Trading Complex is arguably one of the most visited facilities along all of the N2.

The Riversdal Landbouskou (agricultural show) is a popular agricultural festival, taking place annually in February. Riversdale as a popular tourist town, has many coffee shops, restaurants, accommodation facilities and traveller experiences like wineries, horse riding and fishing at the Korentepoort Dam Resort.

== History ==
The town was founded as a church on the farm, Doornkraal, and was subsequently named after Harry Rivers, the then incumbent Civil Commissioner of Swellendam. It was proclaimed a town on 30 August 1838. Riverdale is the seat of the Hessequa Local Municipality. It is also sometimes considered the westernmost point in the Garden Route region.

== Notable residents ==
- Willem Botha, singer
- Dyan Buis, Paralympic athlete
- Dalene Matthee (13 October 1938 – 20 February 2005), writer who matriculated here at Hoërskool Langenhoven
- Dr Cecil Moss, Springbok rugby player and coach
- Jack Simons, academic and anti-apartheid activist
- Jan Ernst Abraham Volschenk (20 August 1853 Riversdale – 22 January 1936 Riversdale), painter noted for his majestic landscapes of the Langeberg Range in the Western Cape Province
- Vera Volschenk (1899-1987), painter born in 1899; eldest of nine daughters of Jan Ernst Abraham Volschenk

== See also ==
- South African Class 7E 4-8-0
- South African Class 7F 4-8-0
