= 1865 in South Africa =

- Decades: 1840s; 1850s; 1860s; 1870s; 1880s
- See also: List of years in South Africa

The following lists events that happened during 1865 in South Africa.

== Incumbents ==
- Governor of the Cape of Good Hope and High Commissioner for Southern Africa: Sir Philip Wodehouse.
- Lieutenant-governor of the Colony of Natal:
  - John Maclean (until 25 July).
  - Sir John Thomas (acting from 26 July to 25 August).
  - Sir John Bisset (acting from 26 August).
- State President of the Orange Free State: Jan Brand.
- President of the Executive Council of the South African Republic: Marthinus Wessel Pretorius.

== Events ==
July

- 26 – Sir John Thomas becomes acting Lieutenant-governor of the Colony of Natal.

August

- 26 – Sir John Bisset becomes acting Lieutenant-governor of the Colony of Natal.

Date unknown

- Ostriches are domesticated.
- Economic depression hits South Africa.
- War breaks out for the second time between the Orange Free State and Basothos.

== Births ==
- 12 January – Jan F. E. Celliers, poet, writer and dramatist. (d. 1940)
- 20 August – Bernard Tancred, cricketer. (d. 1911)

== Deaths ==
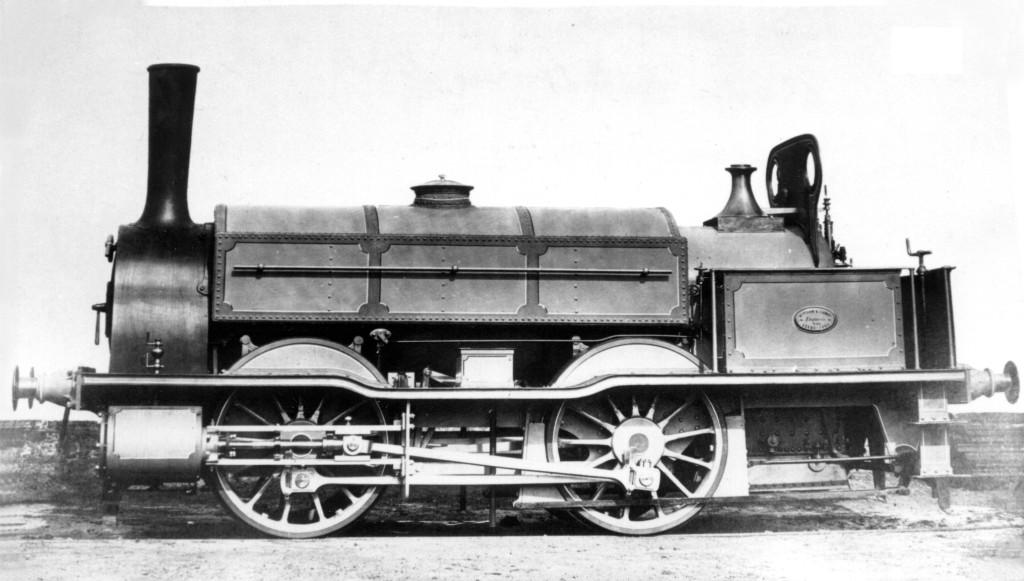
Natal Railway 0-4-0ST "Durban"

- 13 August – Willem Cornelis Janse van Rensburg, second President of the Executive Council of the South African Republic. (b. 1818)
- Date unknown – Louw Wepener, military leader in the Orange Free State. (b. 1812)

== Railways ==
=== Locomotives ===
- The Natal Railway Company obtains a 0-4-0 saddle-tank locomotive from Kitson and Company. The Natal Railway's second locomotive is named Durban.
