= 1870 in South Africa =

- Decades: 1850s; 1860s; 1870s; 1880s; 1890s
- See also: List of years in South Africa

The following lists events that happened during 1870 in South Africa.

== Incumbents ==
- Governor of the Cape of Good Hope and High Commissioner for Southern Africa:
  - Sir Philip Wodehouse (until 19 May).
  - Charles Craufurd Hay (acting from 20 May to 30 December).
  - Sir Henry Barkly (from 31 December).
- Lieutenant-governor of the Colony of Natal: Robert William Keate.
- State President of the Orange Free State: Jan Brand.
- State President of the South African Republic: Marthinus Wessel Pretorius.

== Events ==
May

- 20 – Charles Craufurd Hay becomes acting Governor of the Cape of Good Hope and High Commissioner for Southern Africa.

July

- 30 – The Klipdrift Republic is proclaimed by a group of diamond miners with Stafford Parker as their president.

December

- 31 – Sir Henry Barkly is appointed Governor of the Cape of Good Hope and High Commissioner for Southern Africa.

Date unknown

- The Alfred Basin in Table Bay Harbour, named after Prince Alfred, is completed.

== Births ==
- 24 May – Jan Smuts, South African soldier and statesman. (d. 1950)

== Deaths ==
- 11 March – Moshoeshoe I, King of Lesotho. (b. c. 1786)

== Railways ==
=== Locomotives ===
- A second locomotive is at work on excavation and breakwater construction in Table Bay Harbour, a 0-4-0 saddle-tank engine believed to have been built by Hughes's Locomotive & Tramway Engine Works and delivered to the Cape at some time between 1863 and 1870.
