= 1864 in South Africa =

- Decades: 1840s; 1850s; 1860s; 1870s; 1880s
- See also: List of years in South Africa

The following lists events that happened during 1864 in South Africa.

== Incumbents ==
- Governor of the Cape of Good Hope and High Commissioner for Southern Africa: Sir Philip Wodehouse.
- Lieutenant-governor of the Colony of Natal:
  - John Scott (until 30 December).
  - John Maclean (from 31 December).
- State President of the Orange Free State:
  - Jacobus Johannes Venter (acting until 1 February).
  - Jan Brand (from 2 February).
- President of the Executive Council of the South African Republic:
  - W.C. Janse van Rensburg (until 9 May).
  - Marthinus Wessel Pretorius (from 10 May).

== Events ==
January

- 5 – The Transvaal Civil War ends with Paul Kruger's victory over Jan Viljoen's commando at the Crocodile River.

February

- 2 – Jan Brand is inaugurated as the fourth president of the Orange Free State.

May

- 10 – Marthinus Wessel Pretorius, State President of the Orange Free State from 1860 to 1863, is inaugurated as President of the Executive Council of the South African Republic for a second term.

August

- Bloemhof is founded on the banks of the Vaal River when diamonds are discovered in the area.

December

- 19 – A railway line to Wynberg, constructed with private capital, is opened to the public.
- 31 – John Maclean becomes Lieutenant-governor of the Colony of Natal.

Unknown date

- The Republic of New Scotland is set up in Roburnia in what is now the Amsterdam region.

== Births ==
- 2 February - Jan Brand, lawyer and politician, and the fourth state president of the Orange Free State. (d. 1888)
- 6 November - Abraham Bailey, diamond tycoon, politician, financier and cricketer. (d. 1940)

== Deaths ==
- 1 February – David Hume, explorer and big-game hunter. (b. 1796)
- 5 October – John Fairbairn, newspaper proprietor, educator, financier and politician. (b. 1794)

== Railways ==
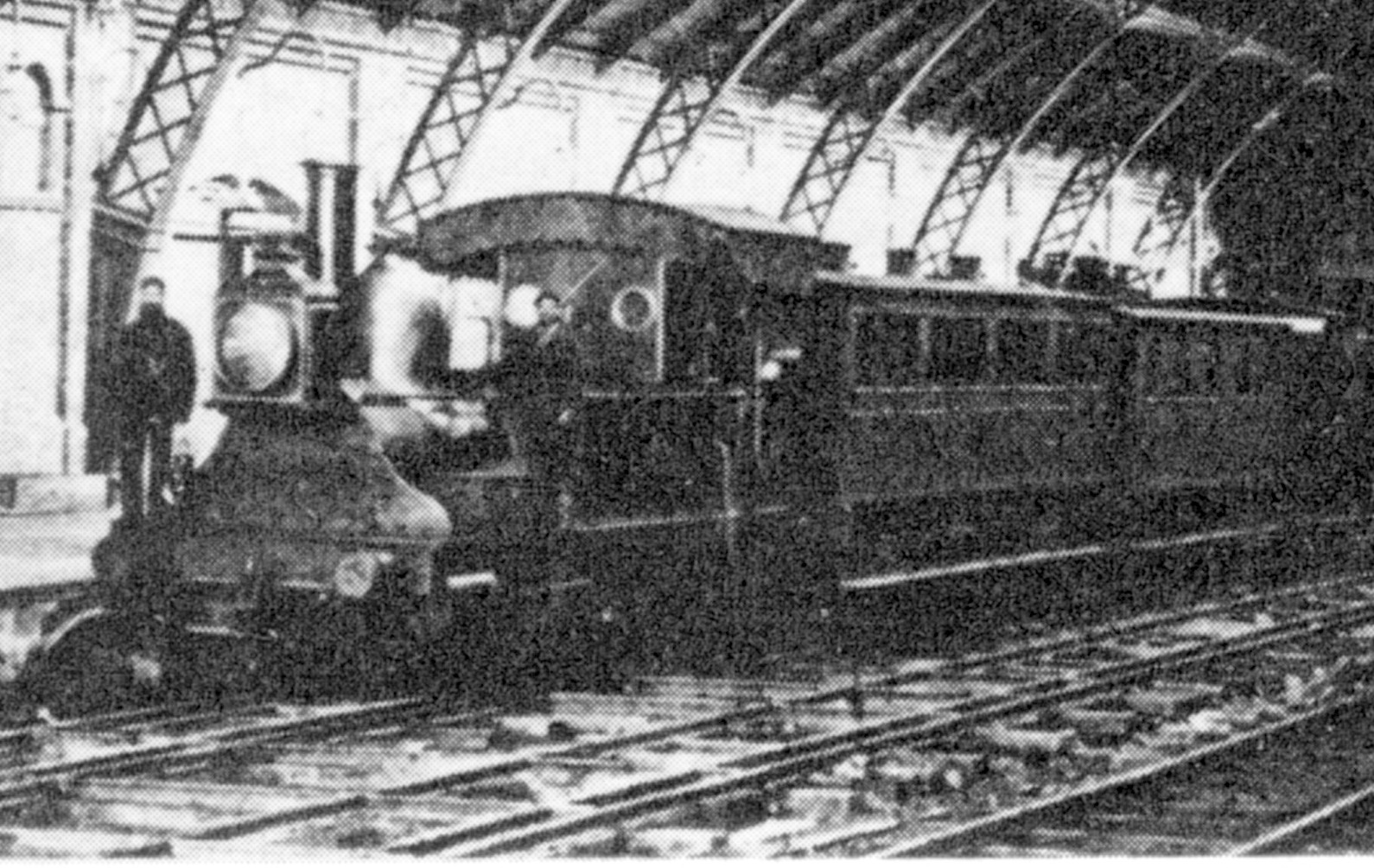
Cape Town Railway & Dock 2-4-0T

=== Railway lines opened ===
- 19 December – Cape Western – Salt River to Wynberg, 6 miles (9.7 kilometres).

=== Locomotives ===
- The first of three 2-4-0 tank locomotives are acquired as motive power for the Wynberg line, one by the Wynberg Railway Company and the other two by the Cape Town Railway and Dock Company who undertakes to rent and operate the line.
