= 1866 in South Africa =

- Decades: 1840s; 1850s; 1860s; 1870s; 1880s
- See also: List of years in South Africa

The following lists events that happened during 1866 in South Africa.

== Incumbents ==
- Governor of the Cape of Good Hope and High Commissioner for Southern Africa: Sir Philip Wodehouse.
- Lieutenant-governor of the Colony of Natal: Sir John Bisset (acting).
- State President of the Orange Free State: Jan Brand.
- President of the Executive Council of the South African Republic: Marthinus Wessel Pretorius (until 21 October).
- State President of the South African Republic: Marthinus Wessel Pretorius (from 22 October).

== Events ==
March

- 1 – Stellenbosch Gymnasium is opened, later to be renamed Stellenbosch University.

October

- 22 – The office of State President of the South African Republic is created by constitutional amendment approved at a session of the Volksraad.

Unknown date

- India officially stops sending Indian labourers to Natal.
- Erasmus Jacobs discovers the 21.25 carats (4.250 g) Eureka Diamond near Hopetown on the banks of the Orange River in the Cape of Good Hope.

== Births ==
- 3 April – J.B.M. Hertzog, Boer General and 3rd Prime Minister of South Africa. (d. 1942)
