= 1867 in South Africa =

- Decades: 1840s; 1850s; 1860s; 1870s; 1880s
- See also: List of years in South Africa

The following lists events that happened during 1867 in South Africa.

== Incumbents ==
- Governor of the Cape of Good Hope and High Commissioner for Southern Africa: Sir Philip Wodehouse.
- Lieutenant-governor of the Colony of Natal:
  - Sir John Bisset (acting until 23 May).
  - Robert William Keate (from 24 May).
- State President of the Orange Free State: Jan Brand.
- State President of the South African Republic: Marthinus Wessel Pretorius.

== Events ==
May

- 24 – Robert William Keate is appointed as Lieutenant-governor of the Colony of Natal.

Date unknown

- The South African diamond fields are discovered.

== Births ==
- 26 March – Sir Arnold Theiler, founder of the Onderstepoort Veterinary Research Institute. (d. 1936)
- 2 October – James Stevenson-Hamilton, first warden of the Kruger National Park. (d. 1957)
- Date unknown – Florence Fuller, South African-born Australian artist. (d. 1946)

== Railways ==
=== Railway lines opened ===
- 4 April – Natal – Durban to Umgeni, 3 miles (4.8 kilometres).
