= 1871 in South Africa =

- Decades: 1850s; 1860s; 1870s; 1880s; 1890s
- See also: List of years in South Africa

The following lists events that happened during 1871 in South Africa.

== Incumbents ==
- Governor of the Cape of Good Hope and High Commissioner for Southern Africa: Sir Henry Barkly.
- Lieutenant-governor of the Colony of Natal: Robert William Keate.
- State President of the Orange Free State: Jan Brand.
- State President of the South African Republic:
  - Marthinus Wessel Pretorius (until 20 November).
  - Daniel Jacobus Erasmus (acting from 21 November).

== Events ==
October

- 27 – British forces march into the Klipdrift Republic and annex the territory as Griqualand West Colony.

November

- 21 – Daniel Jacobus Erasmus becomes acting State President of the South African Republic.

Unknown date

- Gold is discovered at Pilgrim's Creek in the Pilgrim's Rest area.
- When an 83.50 carats (16.700 g) diamond is discovered, a diamond rush results and the town of New Rush springs up.

== Births ==
- 9 January – Eugène Marais, lawyer, naturalist, poet and writer. (d. 1936)
- 7 April – Charlotte Maxeke, religious leader, social worker and political activist. (d. 1939)

== Deaths ==
- 4 October – Sarel Cilliers, Voortrekker leader and preacher. (b. 1801)

== Railways ==
=== Railway lines opened ===
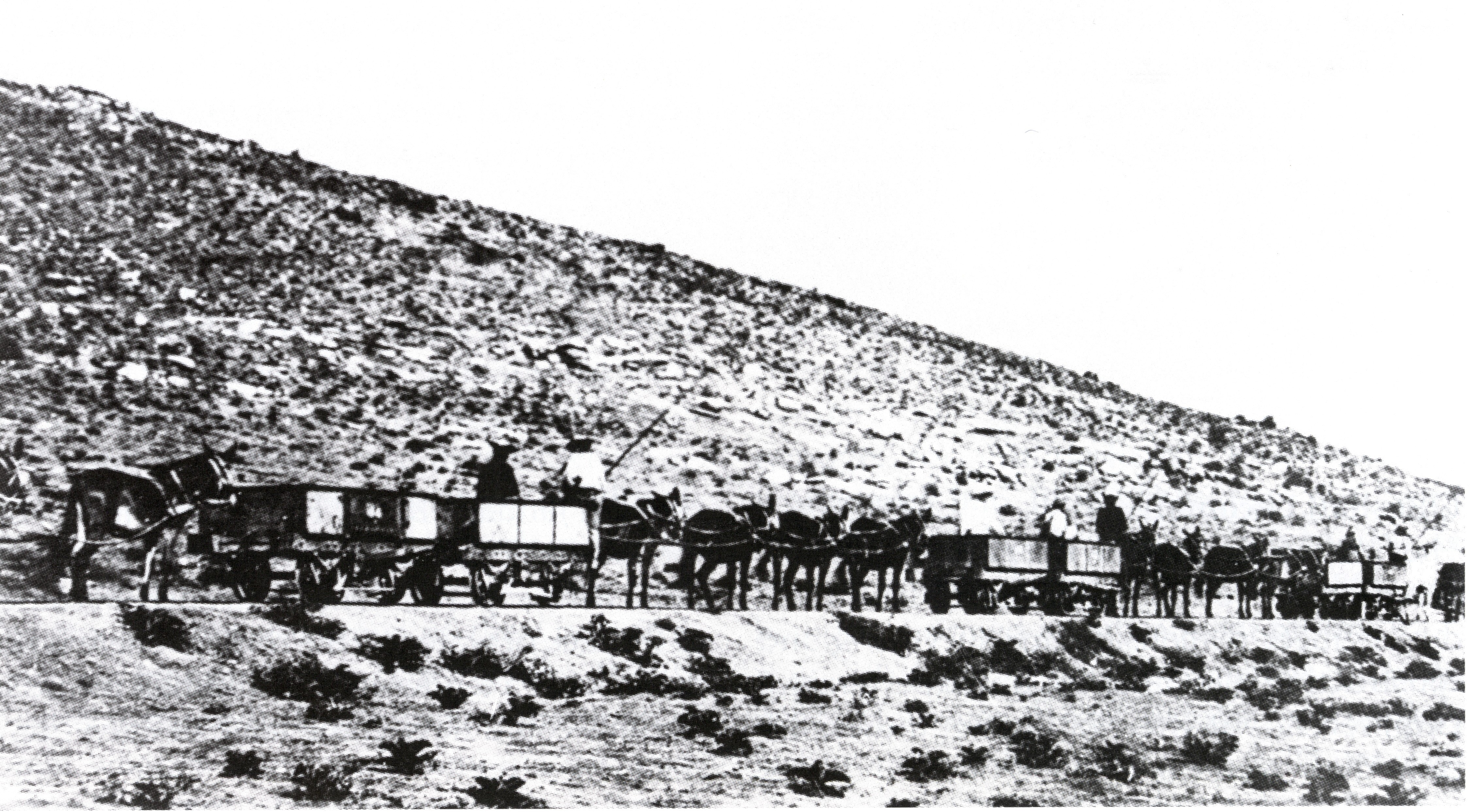
Namaqualand Railway mule train

- 18 February – Namaqualand – Port Nolloth to Muishondfontein, 44 miles 40 chains (71.6 kilometres).

=== Locomotives ===
- Two 2 ft 6 in (762 mm) gauge 0-6-0 tank locomotives are placed in service by the Cape of Good Hope Copper Mining Company, the first steam locomotives to enter service on the hitherto mule-powered Namaqualand Railway between Port Nolloth and the Namaqualand copper mines around O'okiep in the Cape Colony.
