= 1862 in South Africa =

- Decades: 1840s; 1850s; 1860s; 1870s; 1880s
- See also: List of years in South Africa

The following lists events that happened during 1862 in South Africa.

== Incumbents ==
- Governor of the Cape of Good Hope and High Commissioner for Southern Africa:
  - Sir Robert Wynyard (acting until 14 January).
  - Sir Philip Wodehouse (from 15 January).
- Lieutenant-governor of the Colony of Natal: John Scott.
- State President of the Orange Free State: Marthinus Wessel Pretorius.
- President of the Executive Council of the South African Republic:
  - Stephanus Schoeman (acting until 17 April).
  - Willem Cornelis Janse van Rensburg (acting from 18 April).

== Events ==
January

- 15 – Sir Philip Wodehouse becomes Governor of the Cape of Good Hope and High Commissioner for Southern Africa.

April

- 18 – W. C. Janse van Rensburg becomes acting President of the Executive Council of the South African Republic.

October

- 2 – A breakwater construction locomotive for Table Bay Harbour arrives on the ship Navarino.
- 9 – The Transvaal Civil War breaks out following Stephanus Schoeman's unconstitutional ousting of the acting President of the Executive Council of the South African Republic on 6 December 1860.

Unknown date

- Standard Bank of British South Africa Limited is established in London.

== Railways ==
=== Railway lines opened ===
- 1 May – Cape Western – Cape Town to Stellenbosch, 30 miles (48.3 kilometres).

=== Locomotives ===
- The Table Bay Harbour Board acquires a single broad-gauge locomotive, builder or appearance unknown, for excavation and breakwater construction work.

== Births ==
- 24 July - Percy FitzPatrick, author, politician, mining financier and fruit industry pioneer. (d. 1931)
- 27 September – Louis Botha, Boer general and politician. (d. 1919)
