= 1869 in South Africa =

- Decades: 1840s; 1850s; 1860s; 1870s; 1880s
- See also: List of years in South Africa

The following lists events that happened during 1869 in South Africa.

== Incumbents ==
- Governor of the Cape of Good Hope and High Commissioner for Southern Africa: Sir Philip Wodehouse.
- Lieutenant-governor of the Colony of Natal: Robert William Keate.
- State President of the Orange Free State: Jan Brand.
- State President of the South African Republic: Marthinus Wessel Pretorius.

== Events ==
September

- 4 – The first rails of the Namaqualand Railway is laid.

== Births ==
- 2 October – Mahatma Gandhi, Indian activist and politician. (d. 1948)

== Railways ==
=== New lines ===
- Construction begins on the Port Nolloth-O'okiep line.
