= 1868 in South Africa =

- Decades: 1840s; 1850s; 1860s; 1870s; 1880s
- See also: List of years in South Africa

The following lists events that happened during 1868 in South Africa.

== Incumbents ==
- Governor of the Cape of Good Hope and High Commissioner for Southern Africa: Sir Philip Wodehouse.
- Lieutenant-governor of the Colony of Natal: Robert William Keate.
- State President of the Orange Free State: Jan Brand.
- State President of the South African Republic: Marthinus Wessel Pretorius.

== Events ==
March

- 12 – Basutoland is proclaimed a British Protectorate.

Unknown date

- The Koranna War breaks out along the Orange River.
