= 1873 in South Africa =

- Decades: 1850s; 1860s; 1870s; 1880s; 1890s
- See also: List of years in South Africa

The following lists events that happened during 1873 in South Africa.

== Incumbents ==
- Governor of the Cape of Good Hope and High Commissioner for Southern Africa: Sir Henry Barkly.
- Lieutenant-governor of the Colony of Natal:
  - Sir Anthony Musgrave (until 29 April).
  - Thomas Milles (acting from 30 April to 21 July).
  - Sir Benjamin Pine (from 22 July).
- State President of the Orange Free State: Jan Brand.
- State President of the South African Republic: Thomas François Burgers.
- Lieutenant-Governor of Griqualand West: Sir Richard Southey (from 17 July).
- Prime Minister of the Cape of Good Hope: Sir John Molteno.

== Events ==
April

- 30 – Thomas Milles becomes acting Lieutenant-governor of the Colony of Natal.

=== May ===
- 1 – The use of Dutch is officially allowed in the Cape of Good Hope's parliament.
- 14 – The Ohrigstad area is proclaimed a public gold field after gold is discovered in the Selati River.

=== July ===
- 5 – New Rush in Griqualand West is renamed Kimberley after John Wodehouse, 1st Earl of Kimberley.
- 17 – Sir Richard Southey becomes the first Lieutenant-Governor of Griqualand West.
- 22 – Sir Benjamin Pine becomes Lieutenant-governor of the Colony of Natal.

=== August ===
- 20 – Prime Minister John Molteno authorises construction of the new Cape Eastern railway line from East London.

=== December ===
- 4 – HMS Challenger, on its worldwide marine research expedition, is officially welcomed in Cape Town.
- 26 – HMS Challenger arrives at Prince Edward Islands and contacts survey and charts the islands

=== Unknown date ===
- The University of South Africa is founded in Cape Town as the University of the Cape of Good Hope.
- The Cape Government establishes the first district boarding schools to educate children from rural areas while education is standardised at the Cape.
- The town of East London is officially established through the proclaimed merger of the three settlements of Panmure, East London and East London East.
- Warmbad is established as Hartingsburg at the hot springs north of Pretoria.

== Births ==
- 13 August – C.J. Langenhoven, playwright, poet, journalist, politician and author of Die Stem van Suid-Afrika. (d. 1932)
- 20 August – William Henry Bell, musician, composer and first director of the South African College of Music. (d. 1946)

== Deaths ==
- 1 May – David Livingstone is found dead on his knees beside his bed at Lake Bangweolo. (b. 1813)

== Railways ==
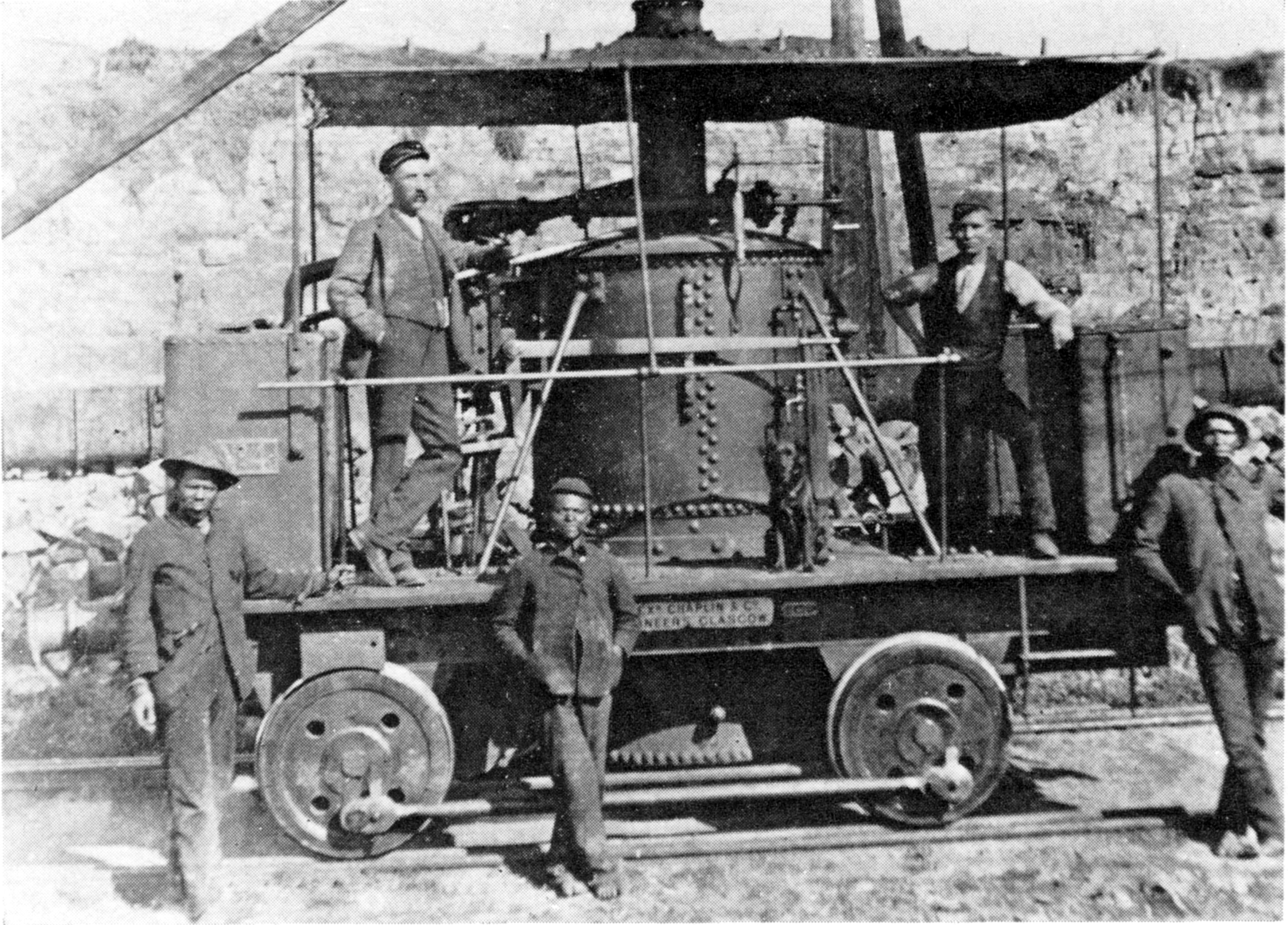
East London Harbour Board 0-4-0

=== Railway lines opened ===
- Namaqualand – Muishondfontein to Kookfontein, 15 miles (24.1 kilometres).

=== Locomotives ===
- Two Cape gauge 0-4-0 saddle tank locomotives enter service at Port Elizabeth on the Midland System of the Cape Government Railways. They are the first Cape gauge locomotives to enter service in South Africa.
- East London's first steam locomotive is landed at East London Harbour, a 7 ft 1/4 in (2,140 mm) Brunel gauge 0-4-0 vertical boiler engine acquired for work on breakwater construction.
