= 1872 in South Africa =

- Decades: 1850s; 1860s; 1870s; 1880s; 1890s
- See also: List of years in South Africa

The following lists events that happened during 1872 in South Africa.

== Incumbents ==
- Governor of the Cape of Good Hope and High Commissioner for Southern Africa: Sir Henry Barkly.
- Lieutenant-governor of the Colony of Natal:
  - Robert William Keate (until 18 July).
  - Sir Anthony Musgrave (from 19 July).
- State President of the Orange Free State: Jan Brand.
- State President of the South African Republic:
  - Daniel Jacobus Erasmus (acting until 30 June).
  - Thomas François Burgers (from 1 July).
- Prime Minister of the Cape of Good Hope: Sir John Molteno (from 1 December).

== Events ==
July

- 1 – Thomas François Burgers becomes State President of the South African Republic.
- 19 – Sir Anthony Musgrave becomes Lieutenant-governor of the Colony of Natal.

December

- 1 – Responsible government is granted to the Cape of Good Hope and the British Governor's powers are significantly curtailed.
- 1 – Sir John Molteno, first Prime Minister of the Cape of Good Hope, forms the first Cape Cabinet.

Unknown date

- The Cape Government Railways is established under Cape Act 10 and takes over the operation of all private railways in the Colony, consisting of altogether 63 miles 26 chains (101.9 kilometres) of track from Cape Town via Stellenbosch to Wellington and from Salt River to Wynberg.
- The Cape Colony Government protests against the British annexation of Griqualand West, which is incorporated as a separate British colony.
- The Voluntary Bill is passed in the Cape, abolishing state subsidies for the Anglican Church.

== Deaths ==
- 1 September – Robert Gray, first Bishop of Cape Town. (b. 1809)

== Railways ==
=== New lines ===
- Construction begins on the Port Elizabeth-Uitenhage line.
