= 1863 in South Africa =

- Decades: 1840s; 1850s; 1860s; 1870s; 1880s
- See also: List of years in South Africa

The following lists events that happened during 1863 in South Africa.

== Incumbents ==
- Governor of the Cape of Good Hope and High Commissioner for Southern Africa: Sir Philip Wodehouse.
- Lieutenant-governor of the Colony of Natal: John Scott.
- State President of the Orange Free State:
  - Marthinus Wessel Pretorius (until 17 June).
  - Jacobus Johannes Venter (acting from 20 June).
- President of the Executive Council of the South African Republic: W.C. Janse van Rensburg (acting until instated).

== Events ==
March

- 18 – Joseph Allison becomes acting State President of the Orange Free State until 17 June during the absence of M.W. Pretorius.

April

- 1 – The Cape Town and Green Point Tramway Company commences with the first horse-drawn trams in Cape Town from the foot of Adderley Street and out along Somerset Road to Green Point.

June

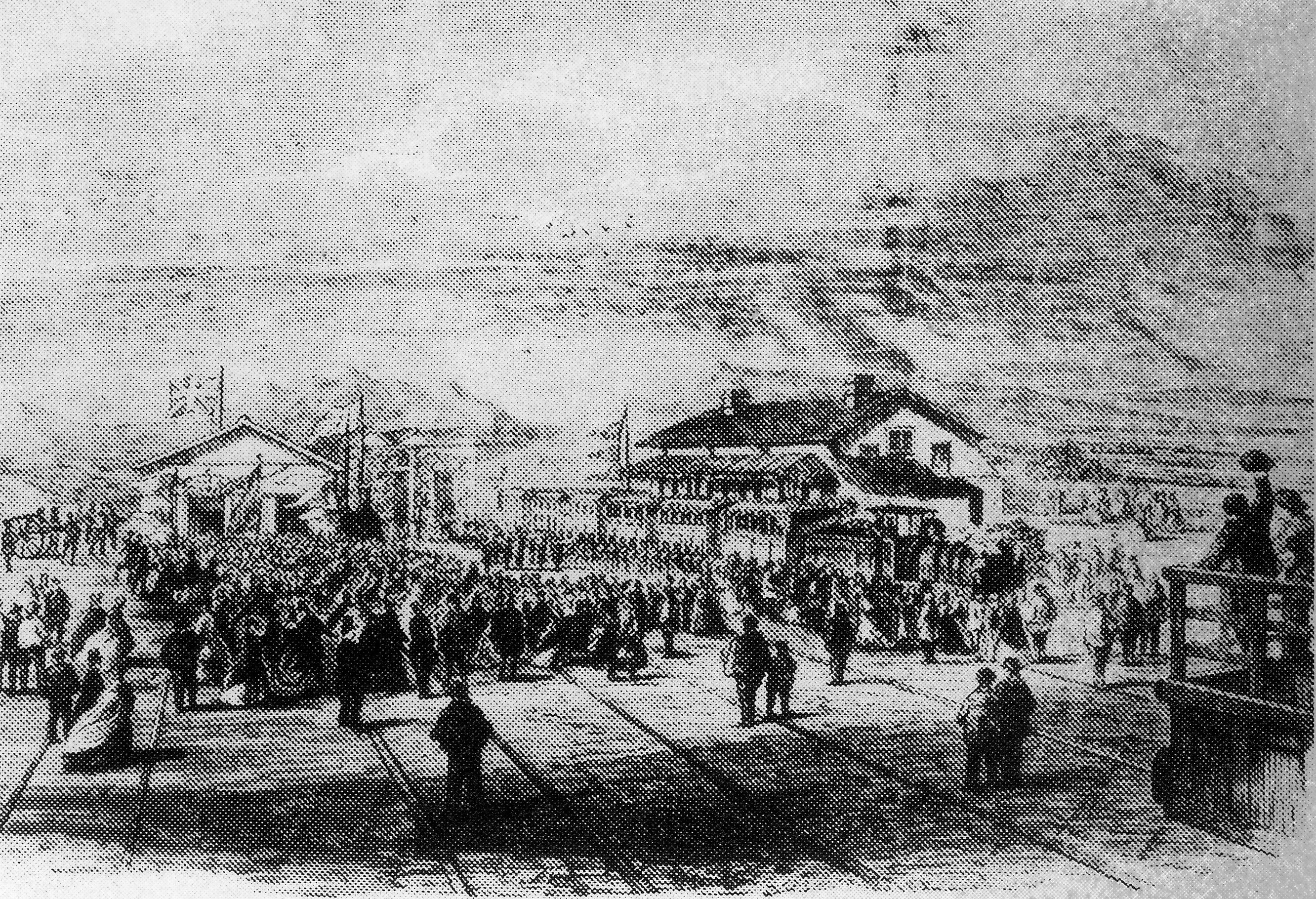
Inaugural train arriving at Wellington

- 17 – M.W. Pretorius resigns as State President of the Orange Free State.
- 20 – Jacobus Johannes Venter becomes acting State President of the Orange Free State.

October

- 23 – Acting President Willem Cornelis Janse van Rensburg becomes President of the Executive Council of the South African Republic.

November

- 4 – The Cape Town-Wellington railway is officially inaugurated.

== Railways ==
=== Railway lines opened ===
- 4 November – Cape Western – Stellenbosch to Wellington, 27 miles (43.5 kilometres).
