= Natal Railway 4-4-0T Perseverance =

Class of 1 South African 4-4-0T locomotive

Natal Railway 4-4-0T Perseverance NGR 4-4-0T Perseverance
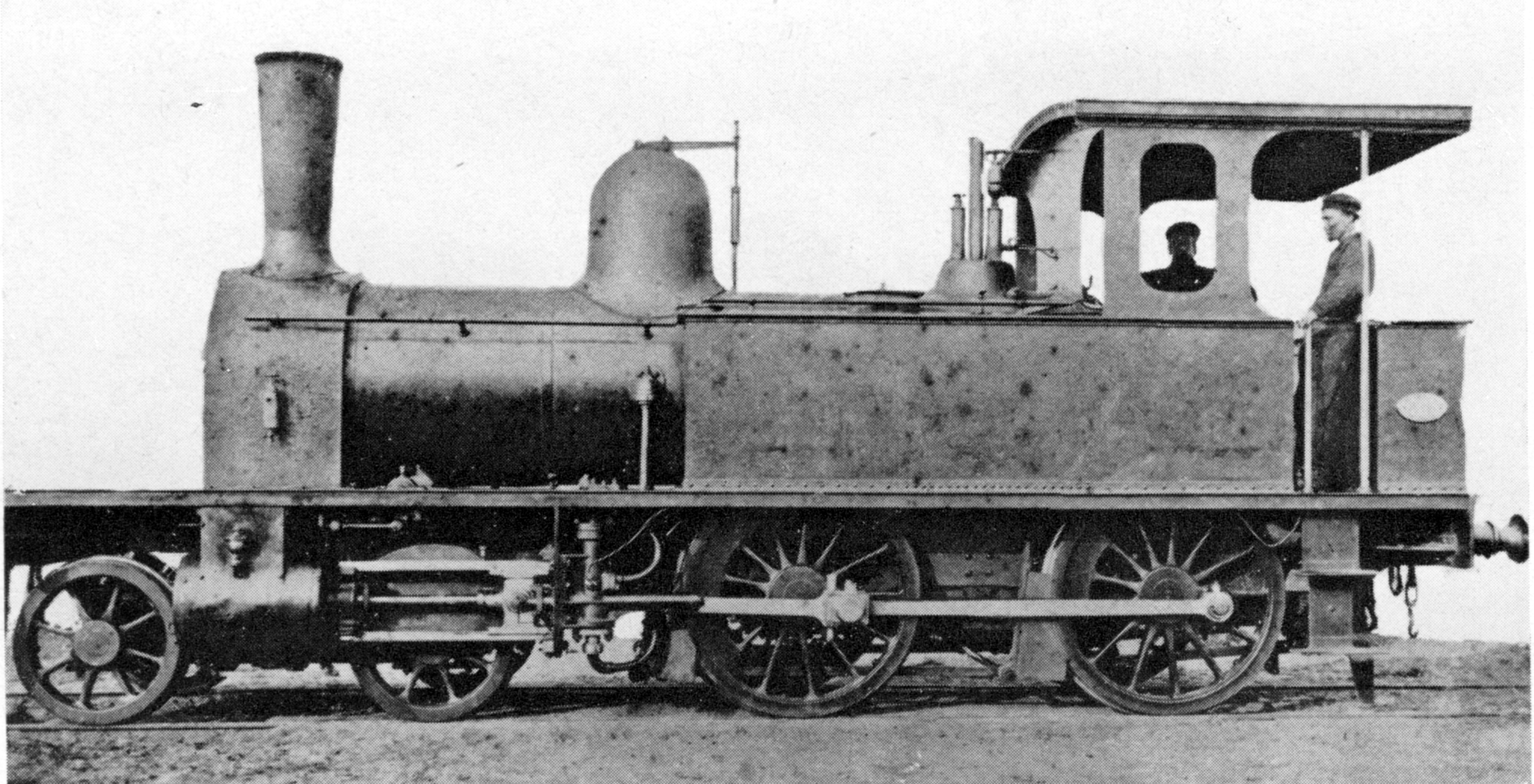
- Perseverance c. 1876
Type and origin
- Power type: Steam
- Designer: Kitson and Company
- Builder: Kitson and Company
- Serial number: 2037
- Build date: 1875
- Total produced: 4
Specifications
- Configuration
  - Whyte: 4-4-0T
  - UIC: 2′Bn2t
- Driver: 1st coupled axle
- Gauge: 4 ft 8 1/2 in (1,435 mm) standard gauge
- Leading dia.: 33 in (838 mm)
- Coupled dia.: 51 in (1,295 mm)
- Wheelbase: 18 ft 4 in (5,588 mm)
- Axle load: 10 LT (10,160 kg)
  - 1st coupled: 10 LT (10,160 kg)
- Adhesive weight: 19.9 LT (20,220 kg)
- Loco weight: 27.9 LT (28,350 kg)
- Fuel type: Coal
- Fuel capacity: 12 long hundredweight (0.61 t)
- Water cap.: 494 imp gal (2,250 L)
- Firebox
  - Type: Round-top
  - Grate area: 9.87 sq ft (0.917 m^{2})
- Boiler
  - Pitch: 5 ft 11 1/8 in (1,807 mm)
  - Diameter: 3 ft 3 1/2 in (1,003 mm)
  - Tube plates: 9 ft 9 in (2,972 mm)
  - Small tubes: 110: 1 3/4 in (44 mm)
- Boiler pressure: 140 psi (965 kPa)
- Safety valve: Salter
- Heating surface
  - Firebox: 50 sq ft (4.6 m^{2})
  - Tubes: 505 sq ft (46.9 m^{2})
  - Total surface: 555 sq ft (51.6 m^{2})
- Cylinders: Two
- Cylinder size: 14 in (356 mm) bore 20 in (508 mm) stroke
- Valve gear: Stephenson
- Couplers: Buffers-and-chain
Performance figures
- Tractive effort: 9,146 lbf (40.68 kN) @ 75%
Career
- Operators: Natal Railway Company; Natal Government Railways
- Number in class: 1
- Official name: Perseverance
- Delivered: 1876
- First run: 1876
- Withdrawn: 1965
- Scrapped: 1967

The Natal Railway 4-4-0T Perseverance of 1876 was a South African steam locomotive from the pre-Union era in the Colony of Natal.

In January 1876, the Natal Railway Company obtained its third and last locomotive, a broad gauge 4-4-0T engine, built by Kitson and Company and named Perseverance. The Natal Government Railways had been established during the previous year. On 1 January 1877, all the assets of the Natal Railway Company were taken over by the Government of the Colony of Natal and became part of the new Government Railways.

== Manufacturer ==
The third and last locomotive to be placed in service by the Natal Railway Company was a broad gauge 4-4-0T} "American" type engine. It was built by Kitson and Company in 1875, with works number 2037. The locomotive arrived in Durban on board the ship Parthenia on 10 January 1876 and was offloaded with some difficulty on the following day. During the offloading, the engine came down with "a crash onto the bulwark, smashing some of the timbers".

At a meeting of the board of directors on 2 February 1876 it was resolved to name the locomotive Perseverance. It was possibly named after the horse-drawn bus which worked between Pietermaritzburg and Durban during the early 1860s.

== Characteristics ==
The locomotive's cylinders were mounted outside the frame and were lubricated by gravitation from two tallow cups, attached to the smokebox sides immediately above the steam chests. The feedwater pumps, attached to the back of the spectacle plate, were operated from the piston crossheads. The locomotive used wooden brake blocks which were driver-operated by a hand brake in the cab.

== Service ==
=== Natal Railway Company ===
By 25 January 1867, the original 2 miles (3.2 kilometres) of track between Market Square in Durban and Point station at Durban harbour had only been extended a further 3.5 miles (5.6 kilometres) to Umgeni, from where stone, quarried from the Umgeni River, was transported to the harbour. No further railway development was undertaken by the Natal Railway Company.

Despite its name, the engine Perseverance did not have a long service life on the rails. In the year before it was delivered, the Natal Government Railways (NGR) had been established. Act 4 of 1875 of the Natal Parliament authorised the takeover of the Natal Railway Company by the Natal Government. All the assets of the Natal Railway Company, including the locomotive fleet of three, were purchased for the sum of £40,000 by the Natal Colonial Government. The railway continued to operate under the Natal Railway name until 1 January 1877, when it became part of the NGR.

=== Natal Government Railways ===
The same Act authorised the extension of the railway lines inland to Pietermaritzburg, up the north coast to Verulam and down the south coast to Isipingo. Since the Natal Government had decided to adopt the 3 feet 6 inches Cape gauge in conformance with the government railways in the Cape of Good Hope which had by then already constructed 240 miles (386 kilometres) of this gauge, the existing tracks were regauged and the railway service life of two of the three broad gauge locomotives came to an end.

Although the Resident Engineer of the new NGR had taken over the new line between Point and Durban from the contractors in February 1878 and had used this track regularly for goods traffic since that date, the broad gauge between Point, Durban and Umgeni was only abandoned on Saturday 11 May of that year. The work in connection with regauging it to the new Cape gauge commenced immediately after the arrival of the last train on the Saturday evening and was completed late on Sunday night. The new line was ready for the first ordinary passenger train on the Monday morning when, for the first time, the new Cape gauge passenger rolling stock was placed on the railway for public service.

The engine Natal of 1860 was sold to a farmer, while the engine Perseverance was converted for use as a stationary engine and employed to drive the sawmill machinery in the Durban railway workshops until it was scrapped in 1887. It is surmised that the second locomotive, the saddle-tank engine Durban of 1865, was possibly regauged to Cape gauge and retained in service, but such a modification has not been confirmed.

== Sister locomotives ==
Preserved Trinidad Government Railway engine

Three locomotives, identical to the engine Perseverance, were also built for the Trinidad Government Railway on the island Trinidad in 1875, with Kitson works numbers 2022 to 2024. Trinidad's engines no. 1 and 13 were two of these locomotives and photographs exist of them.

Later models of these locomotives which were acquired by the island railway, Trinidad's no. 16 and 17, differed mainly in respect of their larger side-tanks. The engine Perseverance, like the first three Trinidad engines, had smaller tanks with a water capacity of 494 imperial gallons (2,250 litres). The later model Trinidad engines had tanks which extended further towards the front of the locomotive, with cutouts at the bottom of the front ends to allow access to parts of the motion above the running boards and with a water capacity of 620 imperial gallons (2,820 litres).

While the engine Perseverance was scrapped only eleven years after entering service, one of the later model Trinidad locomotives was preserved and plinthed on Harris Promenade in San Fernando.
