= Governor Bisset =

Governor Bisset may refer to:

- John Jarvis Bisset (1819–1894), Acting Governor of Natal in 1865
- Murray Bisset (1876–1931), Governor of Southern Rhodesia in 1928 and 1931
