= Natal Railway 0-4-0ST Durban =

Type of steam locomotive

Natal Railway 0-4-0ST Durban NGR 0-4-0ST Durban
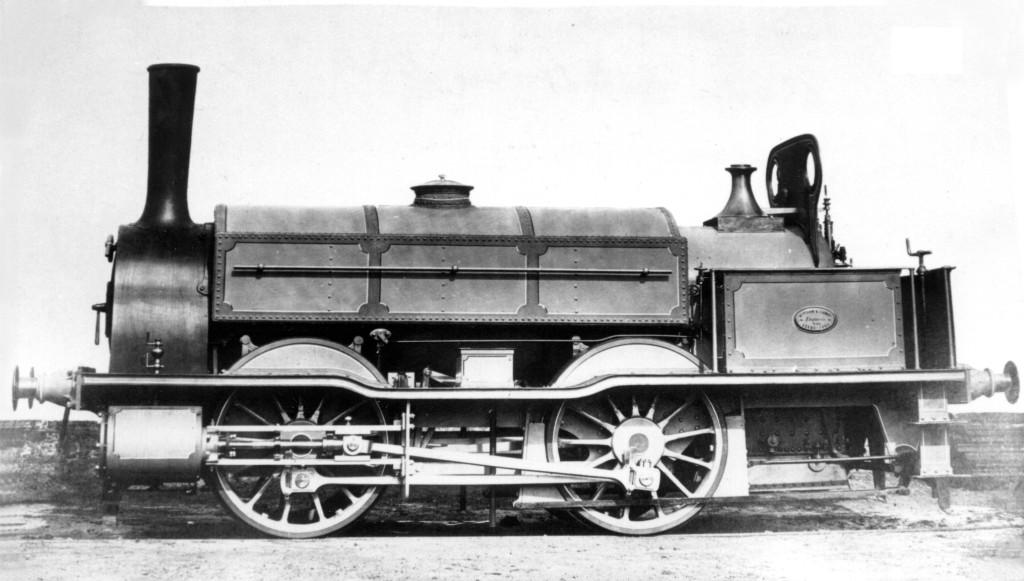
- Natal Railway Company's 0-4-0ST Durban
Type and origin
- Power type: Steam
- Designer: Kitson and Company
- Builder: Kitson and Company
- Serial number: 1271
- Build date: Ex works 25 March 1865
Specifications
- Configuration
  - Whyte: 0-4-0ST
  - UIC: Bn2t
- Driver: 2nd coupled axle
- Gauge: 4 ft 8 1/2 in (1,435 mm) standard gauge
- Coupled dia.: 48 in (1,219 mm)
- Wheelbase: 7 ft 2 in (2,184 mm)
- Length
  - Over couplers: 18 ft 8 3/4 in (5,709 mm)
- Fuel type: Coal
- Firebox
  - Type: Round-top
  - Grate area: 9.27 sq ft (0.861 m^{2})
- Boiler
  - Type: Domeless
  - Pitch: 5 ft 5 in (1,651 mm)
  - Diameter: 3 ft (914 mm)
  - Tube plates: 10 ft 6 in (3,200 mm)
  - Small tubes: 98: 2 in (51 mm)
- Heating surface
  - Firebox: 55 sq ft (5.1 m^{2})
  - Tubes: 552 sq ft (51.3 m^{2})
  - Total surface: 606 sq ft (56.3 m^{2})
- Cylinders: Two
- Cylinder size: 12 in (305 mm) bore 18 in (457 mm) stroke
- Valve gear: Stephenson
- Couplers: Buffers-and-chain
Career
- Operators: Natal Railway Company; Natal Government Railways
- Number in class: 1
- Official name: Durban
- Delivered: 1865
- First run: 1865

The Natal Railway 0-4-0ST Durban of 1865 was a South African steam locomotive from the pre-Union era in the Natal Colony.

In 1865, the Natal Railway Company acquired an 0-4-0ST locomotive. This was the Natal Railway's second locomotive and was named Durban.

== Manufacturer ==
The second locomotive to be placed in service by the Natal Railway Company in Durban was an 0-4-0ST engine named Durban. It was built by Kitson and Company and left the Kitson shops on 25 March 1865, with works number 1271. The locomotive arrived in Durban on 4 August 1865, on board the White Cross Line vessel Actaea.

As built, the locomotive had an open cab area with a spectacle-type weatherboard as only protection for the crew against the elements. It is not known whether the engine was equipped with an enclosed cab post-delivery. It had a domeless boiler which took steam from the steam space above the firebox, with a sandbox mounted atop the boiler.

== Service ==
=== Natal Railway Company ===
For the next ten years, the entire locomotive fleet of the Natal Railway Company consisted of this locomotive and the engine Natal. By 25 January 1867, the original 2 miles (3.2 kilometres) line between Market Square in Durban and Point station at Durban harbour, had only been extended by a further 3.5 miles (5.6 kilometres) to Umgeni. From there stone, quarried from the Umgeni River, was transported to the harbour. No further railway development took place and the locomotive fleet was only expanded to three in January 1876, upon the arrival of the engine Perseverance, a 4-4-0T locomotive.

=== Natal Government Railways ===
In 1875, the Natal Government Railways (NGR) was established. All the assets of the Natal Railway Company were taken over by the Colonial Government and became part of the NGR with effect from 1 January 1877.

Since the Natal Government had decided to implement Cape gauge in conformance with the railways in the Cape of Good Hope and to extend the lines inland to Pietermaritzburg, up the north coast to Verulam and down the south coast to Isipingo, the existing tracks were regauged and the railway service life of two of the three locomotives came to an end.

The engine Natal was sold to a farmer, while the still new engine Perseverance was converted for use as a stationary engine and employed to drive the sawmill machinery in the Durban workshops. It is possible, but not confirmed, that the saddle-tank locomotive Durban was regauged to Cape gauge and retained in service.
