= Natal Railway 0-4-0WT Natal =

Type of steam locomotive

Natal Railway 0-4-0WT Natal NGR 0-4-0WT Natal
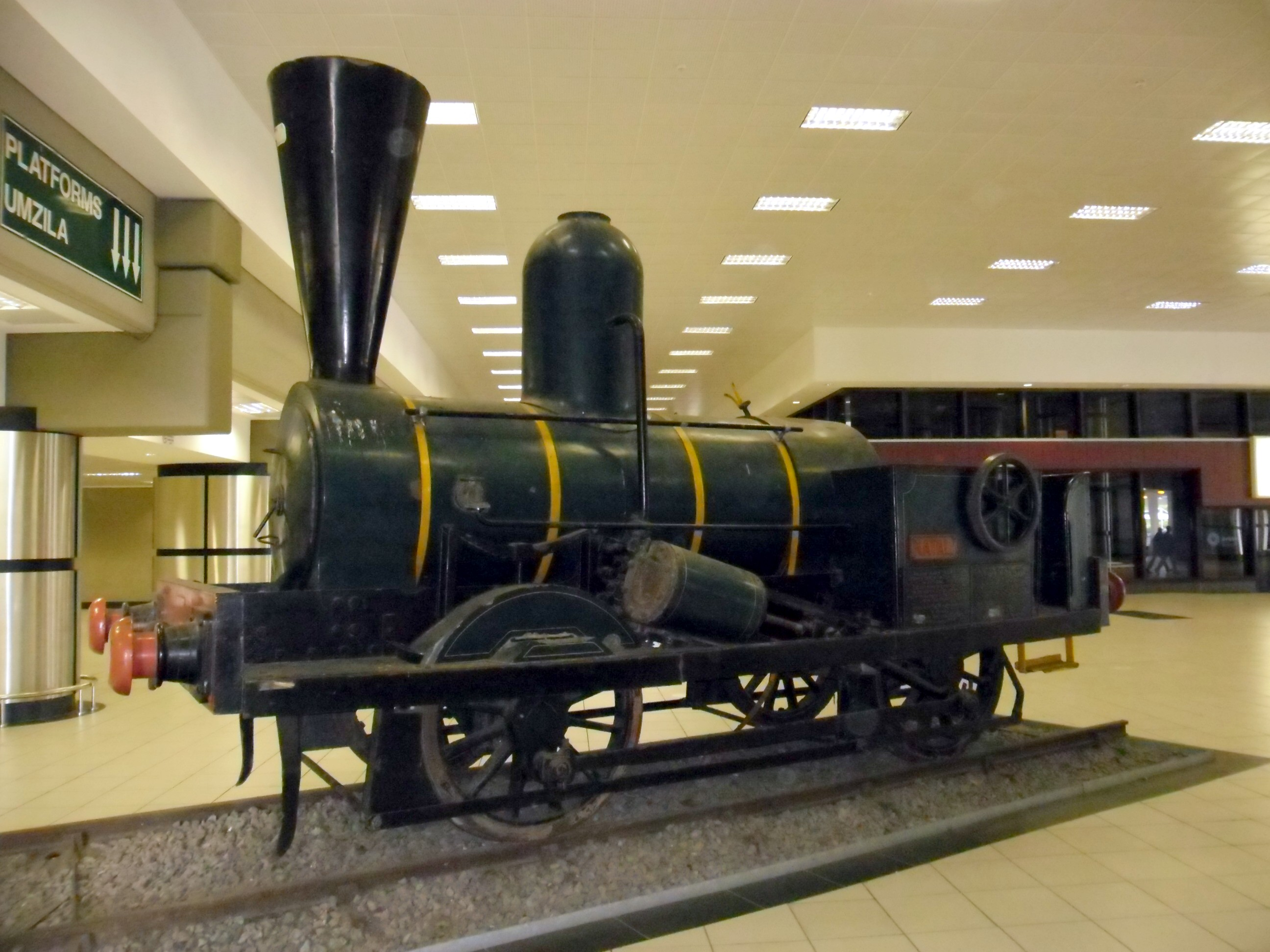
- The reconstructed engine Natal, Durban station
Type and origin
- Power type: Steam
- Designer: Carrett, Marshall & Company
- Builder: Carrett, Marshall & Company
- Build date: 1860
- Total produced: 2
Specifications
- Configuration
  - Whyte: 0-4-0WT
  - UIC: Bn2t
- Driver: 2nd coupled axle
- Gauge: 4 ft 8 1/2 in (1,435 mm) standard gauge Broader than the traditional 3 ft 6 in (1,067 mm) Cape gauge
- Coupled dia.: 45 in (1,143 mm)
- Wheelbase: 9 ft (2,743 mm)
- Length
  - Over beams: 17 ft 6 in (5,334 mm)
- Height: 12 ft (3,658 mm)
- Loco weight: 12 LT (12,190 kg)
- Fuel type: Coal
- Firebox
  - Type: Round-top
- Boiler
  - Pitch: 5 ft (1,524 mm)
- Cylinders: Two
- Couplers: Buffers-and-chain
Performance figures
- Power output: Approximately 24 hp (18 kW)
Career
- Operators: Natal Railway Company; Natal Government Railways
- Number in class: 1
- Official name: Natal
- Delivered: 13 May 1860
- First run: 1860
- Last run: 1875
- Withdrawn: 1875

The Natal Railway 0-4-0WT Natal of 1860 was a South African steam locomotive from the pre-Union era in the Natal Colony.

Not the first Locomotive in South Africa but the first to run in revenue service in South Africa, the Natal Railway Company's engine Natal, was landed at Durban Harbour on 13 May 1860. It made its inaugural run on 26 June 1860, during the official opening of the first operating railway in South Africa.

== The locomotive Natal ==
The first revenue-earning railway service in South Africa commenced in Durban in the Colony of Natal on 26 June 1860. The train was hauled by a small broad gauge 0-4-0 well-tank engine named Natal, which was landed at Durban Harbour off the brig Cadiz on 13 May 1860. The engine arrived stripped down and was erected by Henry Jacobs, engine fitter, driver and locomotive superintendent of the Natal Railway Company, assisted by Alexander Davidson, chief smith, fitter, springmaker, platelayer and head of the repair shops. A young seaman named Austin was taken on as cleaner and greaser, and ultimately promoted to stoker. A station on the Bluff was later named after Henry Jacobs.

The locomotive Natal was, however, not the first locomotive to arrive in South Africa, having been denied that honour by nine engines in the Cape of Good Hope. These were Blackie, the 0-4-0T construction locomotive which had arrived in Cape Town on 8 September 1859, and the eight [[Cape Town Railway & Dock 0-4-2|0-4-2 tender locomotives]] of the Cape Town Railway and Dock Company which had arrived in two shipments on 20 March and 28 April 1860 respectively.

Although the Cape's construction locomotive had possibly been used before June 1860 on the construction of the Cape Town-Wellington Railway, a project which had commenced on 31 March 1859, official revenue-earning railway operations in the Cape only commenced when the first section of the line, between Fort De Knokke and Salt River in Cape Town, was officially opened on 8 February 1861.

== Manufacturer ==
For many years credit as the locomotive builder of the engine Natal had been attributed to the City of London Engine Works, the London company of Robert Legg, but subsequent research showed that Robert Legg was merely the agent through whom the shipping of the locomotive to Durban was arranged. The actual manufacturer was a firm by name of Carrett, Marshall and Company of Leeds, while Robert Legg was its London agent. Further research by a member of the Railway Society of Southern Africa has shown that at least two of these locomotives were built, the other having gone to the Caribbean to work in the sugar industry.

The engine carried its water in a well-tank and the coal in a locker on the footplate. A donkey pump on the coal locker fed water to the boiler. The chimney had an inverted conical shape and the wide opening was covered by wire mesh, to serve as a spark arrester. The locomotive was erected in a tarred timber shed on Market Square in Durban and was painted green, with copper-coloured wheels and with a huge polished brass dome cover.

== Service ==
When the locomotive arrived in Durban, the railway had already been in use for some time, but until then the railway trucks were hauled by oxen. The Natal Railway's initial rolling stock consisted of six to eight trucks, two travelling cranes and one passenger coach.

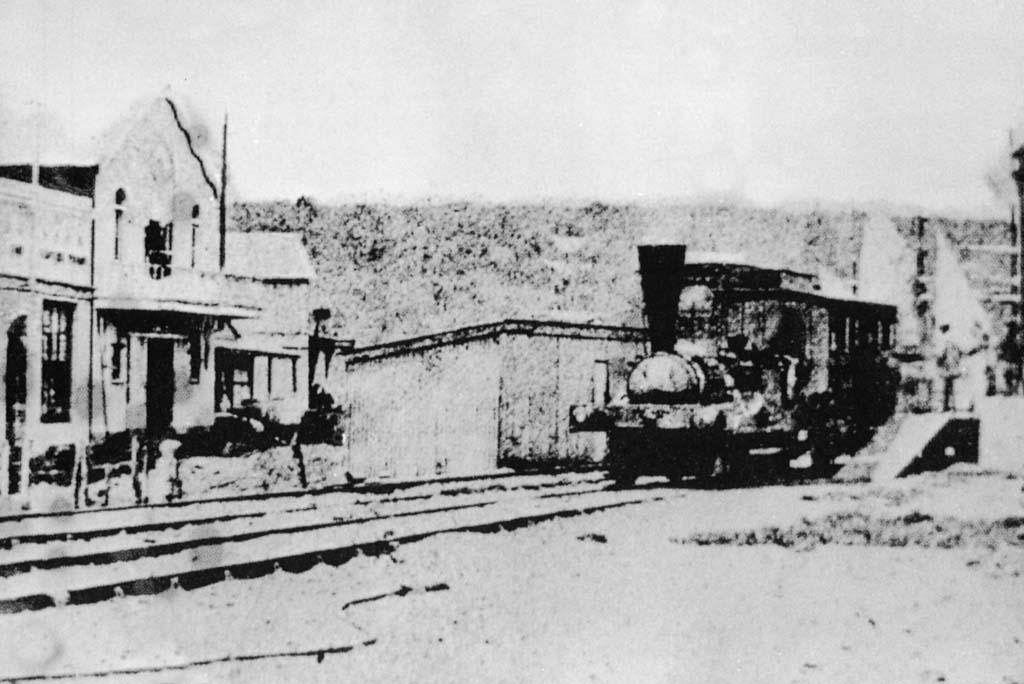
Natal arriving at Point Station on its inaugural run in June 1860

According to most publications, the official opening of the newly mechanised Natal Railway took place on Tuesday, 26 June 1860, a little more than a month after the engine arrived. The inaugural run was at 11:00 along a 2-mile (3.2-kilometre) stretch from the Market Square Ordnance Reserve in Durban to the newly built Point station at Durban harbour, near the Custom House. This was followed by passenger rides for the public for the rest of the day, at a return fare of one shilling. The day's festivities ended with a ball in the Masonic Hall.

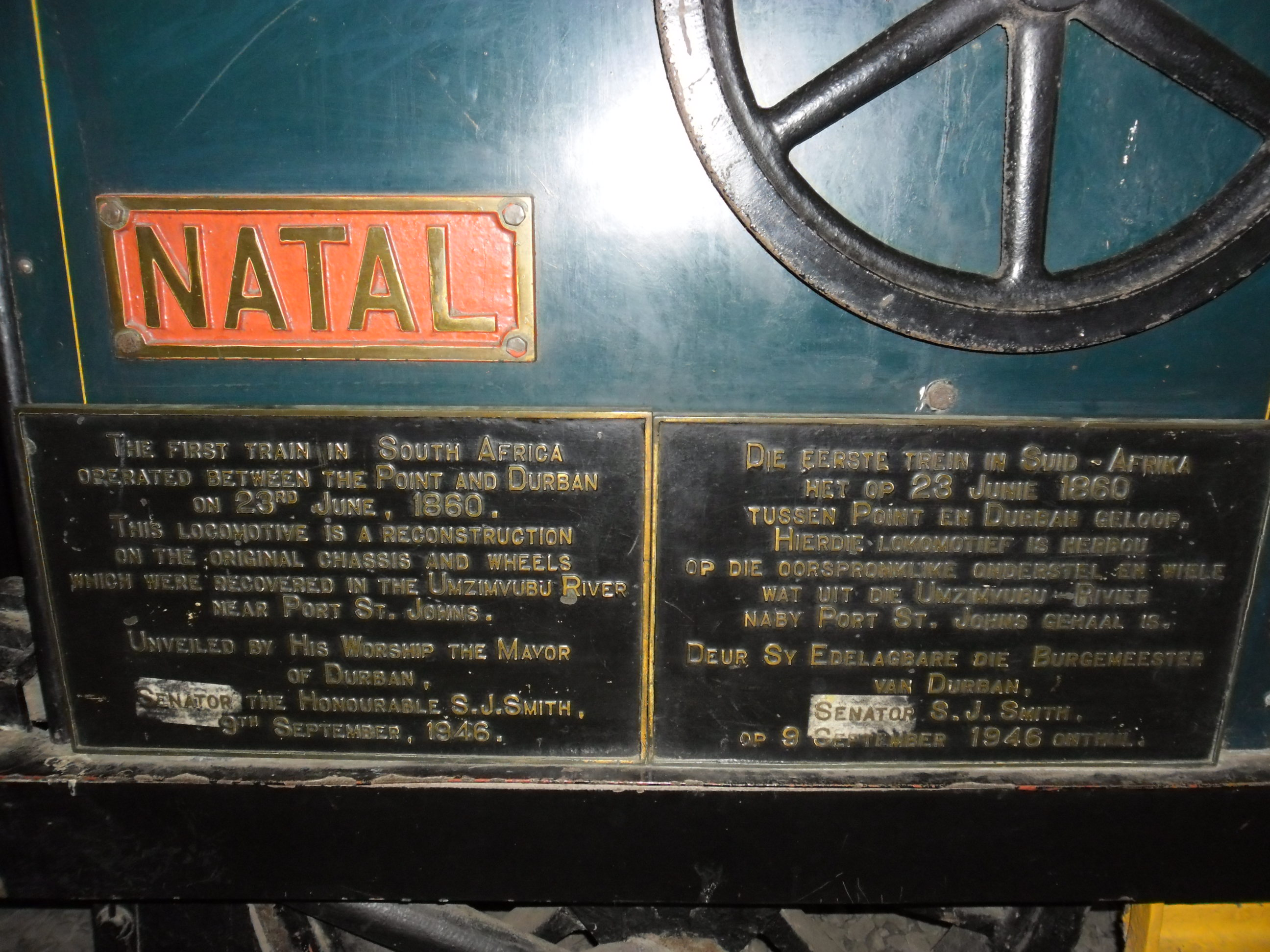
Commemorative plaque on Natal

According to the plaque on the reconstructed locomotive, however, the date of its first run was 23 June 1860. In fact, both these dates are correct since a trial run had been conducted three days before the official inauguration, on Saturday afternoon, 23 June 1860. After testing the locomotive over a short distance, the passenger coach was coupled and the train set off to the Point with the company chairman and secretary as passengers. At the Point it collected five trucks loaded with some 40 tons of sugar-mill machinery and some standing passengers.

The locomotive gave satisfactory service for several years, but was plagued by the sandy conditions of the track, which resulted in damage to moving parts from dust and beach sand. The constant repair work which this required, led to frequent delays. The locomotive was eventually transferred to Port St. Johns, where it was used on the harbour works.

== Nationalisation ==
A second locomotive was acquired by the Natal Railway Company in 1865, a [[Natal Railway 0-4-0ST Durban|0-4-0ST locomotive named Durban]]. By 25 January 1867, the line had only been extended a further 3 1/2 miles (5.6 kilometres) to Umgeni, from where stone, quarried from the Umgeni River, was transported to the harbour.

No further railway development took place in Natal until 1875, when the Natal Government Railways (NGR) was established. On 1 January 1877, all the assets of the Natal Railway Company were taken over by the Colonial Government and it became part of the NGR. Since the Government had decided to implement Cape gauge, in conformance with the railways in the Cape of Good Hope, and to extend the lines inland to Pietermaritzburg, up the north coast to Verulam and down the south coast to Isipingo, the existing tracks were regauged and the railway service life of the engine Natal came to an end after only fifteen years.

== Superstition ==
The engine Natal was put up for sale and purchased by a Mr. Crowther, who intended to use it to drive a sawmill on his farm at Port St. Johns. He was, however, unable to make use of it since the local population labour force objected to this "devil's machine" and embarked on a boycott, culminating in Crowther having to abandon his farm, and the engine.

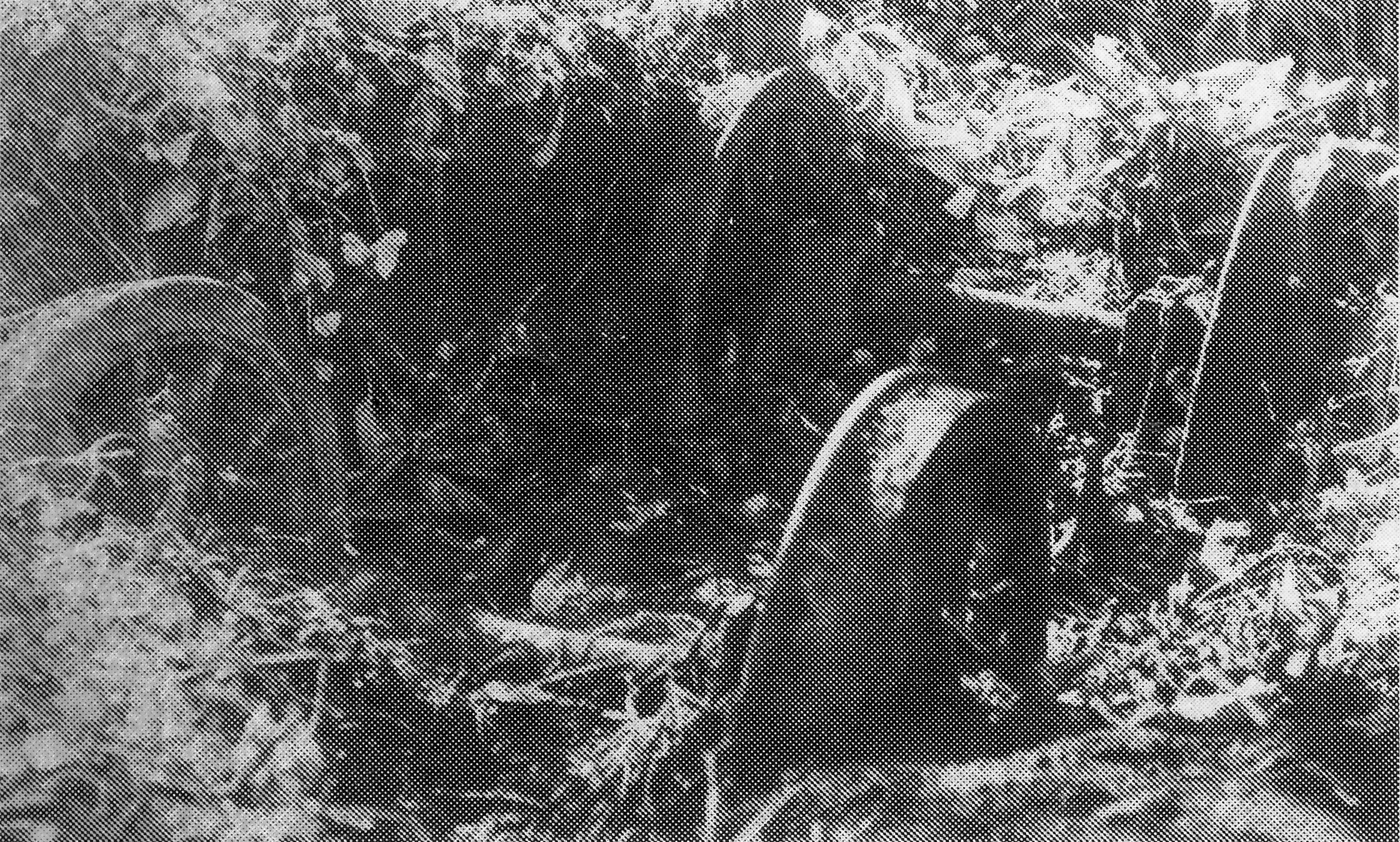
The remains of Natal being exhumed

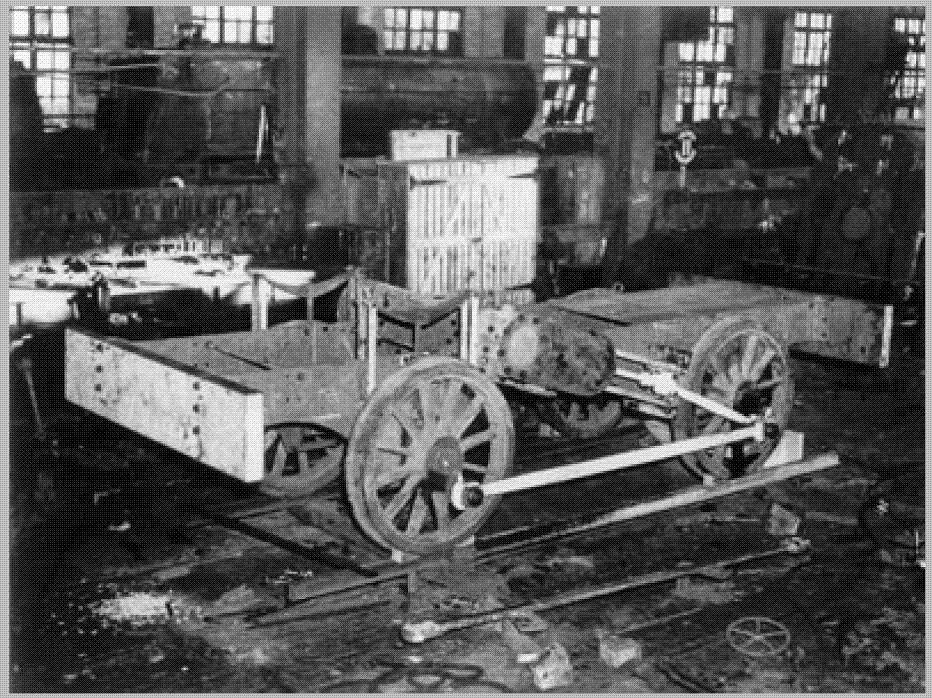
Natal in Durban shops, 26 June 1944

In 1886 one Alex Anderson purchased the farm for sugar planting, but when he decided to use the engine to drive a sugar mill, another early example of South African rolling mass action ensued and he, too, was forced to leave.

The farm was then acquired by one Harry Cooper, who buried the engine on the banks of the Mzimvubu River. He was left unmolested thereafter and proceeded to grow tobacco. Cooper remained on the farm until 1901, when he sold it to one Sam Clarke of Umtata, who converted the property into a fruit farm. By this time the actual location of the locomotive's grave had become lost.

== Resurrection ==
On 28 May 1943, the late Theo Espitalier, who had been commissioned to prepare a history of the locomotives of South Africa, managed to locate the grave of the engine Natal. The remains were excavated and transferred to Durban, arriving there on 26 June 1944, eighty-four years to the day after this engine had hauled the first train in South Africa.

The frame, the wheels, the springs, the cylinders and some odd loose parts were literally all that remained of the old locomotive. The engine was reconstructed in the Durban workshops of the South African Railways, with many missing parts having to be fashioned to approximately the original shape and size. Even though it was not an exact reconstruction in every sense of the word, it was sufficiently close to the original to represent what the engine may have looked like on the day the South African Railways was born in 1860. It was plinthed on the island of platforms 7 and 8 at Durban station, where it was officially unveiled by the Mayor of Durban, Senator S.J. Smith, on 9 September 1946.

The last day of operations at the original Durban Station was Friday 14 November 1980, after which all operations moved to the new Durban station about 2 kilometres (1.2 miles) away in Greyville. The engine Natal was moved to the concourse of the new station.
