= Natal Railway Company =

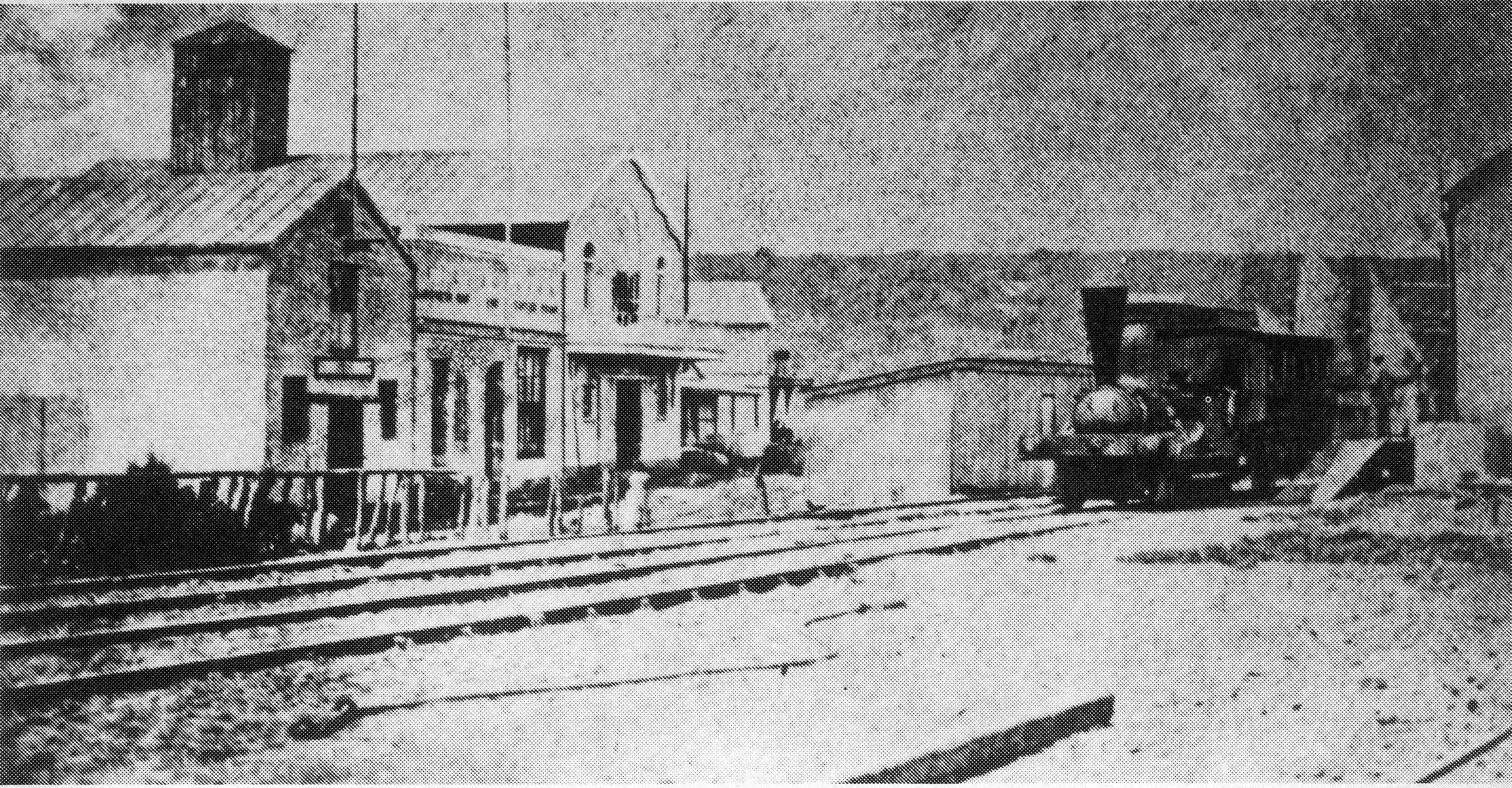
- The Natal arriving at Point Station, 26 June 1860

Technical
- Track gauge: 4 ft 8 1/2 in (1,435 mm)

The Natal Railway Company was formed in January 1858 for the construction of a 3 kilometres (1.9 mi) railway in Durban.

The Natal Railway Company made use of 4 ft 8 1/2 in (1,435 mm) broad gauge. The 3 ft 6 in (1,067 mm) Cape gauge was only adopted in Natal in 1876 when the Natal Government Railways was established.

The railway's first steam locomotive, the 0-4-0WT Natal, started operations on 26 June 1858. Up until that time the railway had been operated using ox-drawn wagons. The inaugural run was across a 2 mi (3.2 km) stretch from Market Square in Durban to the newly built Point station at Durban harbour.

Alexander McArthur, the mayor of Durban described the new line in a letter to Sir George Grey.

We have some satisfaction in pointing also to the line of railway connecting the town and port, the first that has been brought into actual operation in South Africa. Its importance must not be measured by its length; for, short as it is, it has already, during its existence of a few weeks, been of essential service in expediting the traffic between the only port of our Colony and the interior. It is, besides, only the beginning of other lines which we hope soon to see inaugurated, and which will tend to carry ideas of English power and civilisation into the very strongholds of native ignorance and barbarism.

— Alexander McArthur, Mayor of Durban,

The Natal Railway Company's initial rolling stock consisted of six wagons, two travelling cranes and one passenger coach. By 25 January 1867 the line had been extended a further 3.5 mi (5.6 km) to Umgeni, from where stone, quarried from the Umgeni River, was transported to the harbour.

All the assets of the Natal Railway Company, including its locomotive fleet of three, were purchased for the sum of £40,000 by the Natal Colonial Government in 1876. The railway continued to operate under the Natal Railway name until it became part of the Natal Government Railways with effect from 1 January 1877. The Natal remained in service for fifteen years, but since the newly established Natal Government Railways adopted 3 ft 6 in (1,067 mm) Cape gauge in conformance with the railways in the Cape Province, the existing lines were also converted to Cape gauge.

== See also ==
- Rail transport in South Africa
