= Charles Craufurd Hay =

British Army officer

Lieutenant-General Charles Craufurd Hay
- Born: 1809
- Died: 1873 (aged 63–64); Isle of Wight
- Military career
- Allegiance: United Kingdom
- Branch: British Army
- Rank: Lieutenant-General

Lieutenant-General Charles Craufurd Hay (1809–1873) was a British Army officer who became General Officer Commanding-in-Chief, Cape of Good Hope.

== Military career ==
Hay was commissioned as an ensign in the 19th Regiment of Foot on 27 June 1824. He became General Officer Commanding-in-Chief, Cape of Good Hope in December 1868, in which capacity he briefly acted as Governor of Cape Colony in 1870, before retiring in September 1873. As acting governor he was sympathetic to the claims of the Griqua Chief, Nicolaas Waterboer, against the Government of the Orange Free State.

He was also colonel of the 58th Regiment of Foot and then of the 93rd Regiment of Foot.

Military offices
| Preceded by Alexander Fisher Macintosh | Colonel of the 93rd (Sutherland Highlanders) Regiment of Foot; 1868–1873 | Succeeded by Sir Henry William Stisted |
| Preceded by Edward Buckley Wynyard | Colonel of the 58th (Rutlandshire) Regiment of Foot; 1864–1868 | Succeeded by William Sullivan |
