= Henry Barkly =

British politician and colonial governor (1815–1898)

Sir Henry Barkly GCMG KCB FRS FRGS
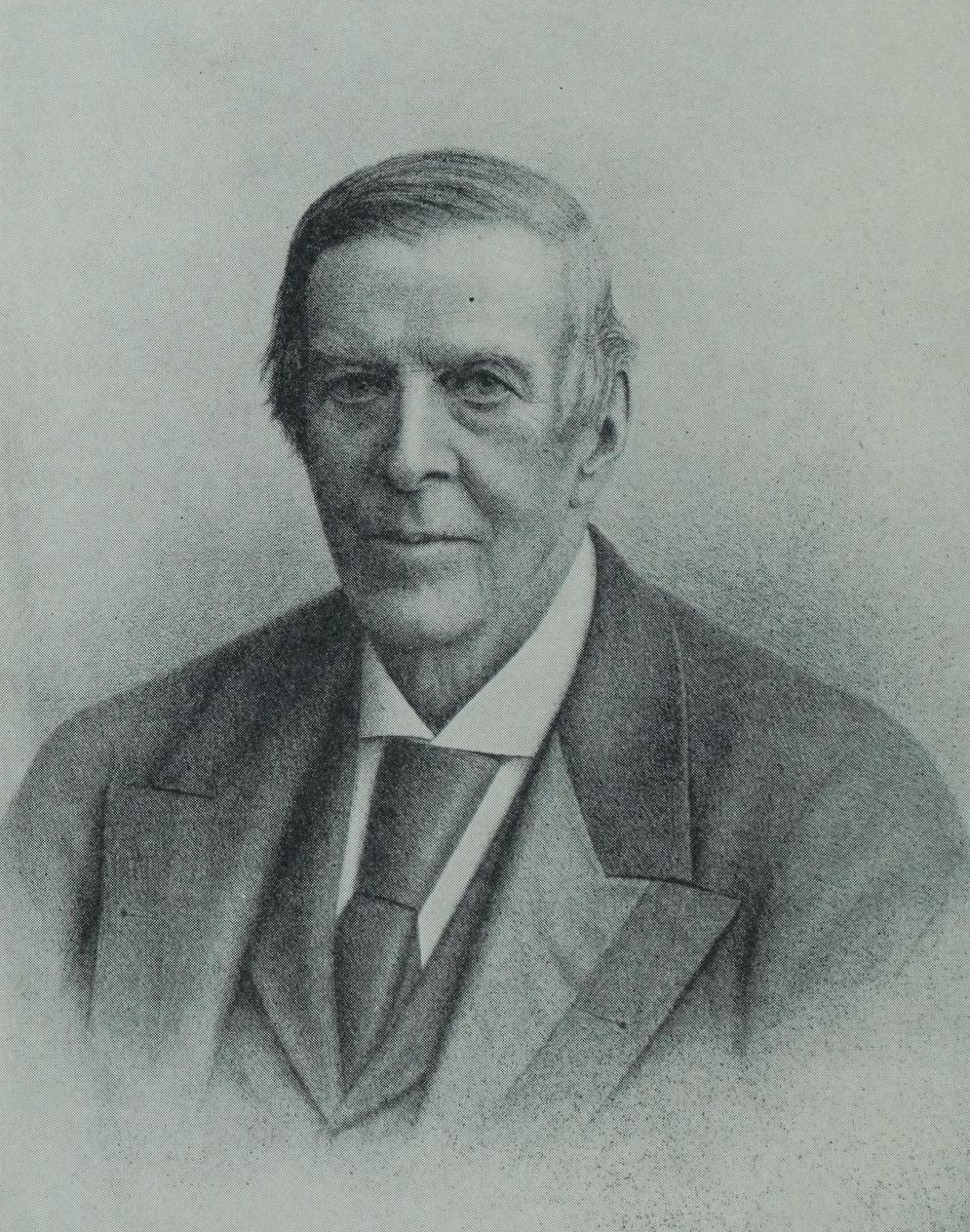

4th Governor of British Guiana
- In office 24 February 1849 – 11 May 1853
- Monarch: Victoria
- Preceded by: Henry Light
- Succeeded by: Sir Philip Wodehouse

Governor of Jamaica
- In office 1853–1856
- Monarch: Victoria
- Preceded by: Charles Edward Grey
- Succeeded by: Charles Henry Darling

2nd Governor of Victoria
- In office 26 December 1856 – 10 September 1863
- Preceded by: Sir Charles Hotham
- Succeeded by: Sir Charles Henry Darling

10th Governor of Mauritius
- In office 21 August 1863 – 3 June 1870
- Preceded by: Sir William Stevenson
- Succeeded by: Sir Arthur Hamilton-Gordon

14th Governor of Cape Colony
- In office 31 December 1870 – 31 March 1877
- Monarch: Victoria
- Preceded by: Sir Philip Wodehouse
- Succeeded by: Sir Henry Frere

Personal details
- Born: 24 February 1815 Highbury, Middlesex, England, UK
- Died: 20 October 1898 (aged 83) South Kensington, London, England, UK
- Resting place: Brompton Cemetery
- Spouse(s): Elizabeth Helen Timins (1840–1857); Anne Maria Pratt (1860–1898)

Sir Henry Barkly GCMG KCB FRS FRGS (24 February 1815 – 20 October 1898) was a British politician, colonial governor and patron of the sciences.

== Early life and education ==
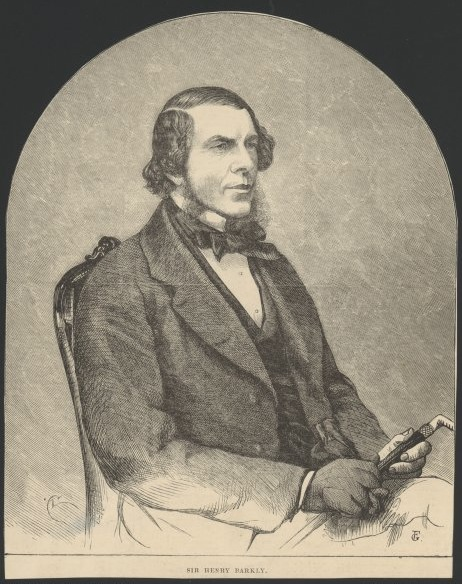

Born on 24 February 1815 at Highbury, Middlesex (now London), he was the eldest son of Susannah Louisa (born ffrith) and Æneas Barkly, a Scottish born West India merchant. He was educated at Bruce Castle School in Tottenham, where the school's particular curriculum endowed him with a lifetime interest in science and statistics.

Upon completing his schooling and studies in commerce, Barkly worked for his father. The Barkly family had several connections with the West Indies: Barkly's mother, Susannah Louisa, whose maiden name was ffrith, was the daughter of a Jamaica planter; his father's company was concerned with trade in the West Indies; and the family owned an estate in British Guiana.

According to the Legacies of British Slave-ownership database Barkly's father was compensated £132,000 from the Imperial Parliament for the emancipation of some 4,440 slaves in 1834. Barkly inherited his father's estate in 1836 at the age of 20. He was awarded two of the compensation claims following his father's death. He remained involved in the partnership until 1843.

== Political career ==
Barkly was elected to the House of Commons at a by-election on 26 April 1845 as one of the two Members of Parliament (MPs) for the borough Leominster. He was returned unopposed, and The Times observed that his election address did not render voters "much wiser" about his political views.

As a Peelite, one of the supporters of Prime Minister Robert Peel, Barkly found himself adrift with few political prospects when Peel was overthrown, and he gratefully accepted the governorship of British Guiana when the post was offered by his Liberal opponents in 1848.

== Governorships ==
=== Governor of British Guiana ===
Barkly was sworn in as Governor and Commander-in-Chief of British Guiana on 12 February 1849. His family connections with British Guiana and the West Indies in general served him well as governor of the colony, and prompted Lord Grey, the Secretary of State for War and the Colonies, to refer to his "remarkable skill and ability" in addressing the colony's economic issues by widening the franchise of the College of Kiezers and introducing indentured servants from Asia.

=== Governor of Jamaica ===
In 1853, he was transferred to Jamaica and served three years as its governor and captain-general.

=== Governor of Victoria ===
In November 1856, Barkly was appointed Governor of Victoria, Australia, arriving in Melbourne on 24 December 1856. He achieved one of his main goals of stable government with the appointment of the James McCulloch ministry. He was noted for his support of philanthropic and intellectual movements. He was a founder and president of the Royal Society of Victoria, 1860–63, and helped to found the National Gallery of Victoria, the Acclimatization society of Victoria and the Melbourne Observatory.

=== Governor of Mauritius and the Cape Colony ===
He was appointed 10th Governor of Mauritius from 26 November 1863 to 4 June 1870.

In August 1870 he was sent to the Cape Colony as governor and as British High Commissioner for Southern Africa. He helped to implement responsible government in the Cape and worked closely with John Molteno, its first elected Prime Minister. He served in South Africa until 1877, and played an important role in assisting the early growth of the Cape Liberal tradition. He was also influential in supporting the local resistance against Lord Carnarvon's attempt to unite the region's states into a federation (inspired by the success of the Canadian Confederation). Crucially, he shared with the Cape government the belief that the Cape's non-racial constitution was still fragile and that it was "impossible that the Cape's native laws would survive a session of bargaining with the Boer republics. Federation in 1875 would have produced the same results as Union did in 1910... Barkly was undoubtedly right to foster the nucleus of a Liberal party which was forming around Molteno. Liberal democracy was a tender plant in the climate of South Africa, but it had taken root in the Cape, and it was only the insensitive handling of Downing Street which prevented it growing, as Barkly hoped, into a force which would have been strong enough to control the other tendencies in South African politics."

He was involved with the Royal Commission on Colonial Defence in 1879.

He died in Brompton, Kensington, London, on 20 October 1898 and is buried in Brompton Cemetery.

== Family ==
In 1840, he married Elizabeth Helen, the second daughter of J. F. Timins. Elizabeth was an artist and botanical collector who collected with her husband and undertook illustrations for him. She died in 1857 leaving him with their daughter Emily. Emily was also a botanical artist, drawing illustrations for her father and collecting botanical specimens. Barkly was remarried to the botanist Anne Maria Pratt, the daughter of Thomas Simson Pratt, three years after the death of his first wife. His oldest son Arthur Cecil Stuart Barkly (1843–1890) was his father's private secretary in Mauritius and the Cape, and went on to become the last British governor of Heligoland.

== Honours ==
Henry Barkly was awarded a Knight of the Order of the Bath on 18 July 1853, just prior to his appointment as Governor of Jamaica. He was made a Fellow of the Royal Society (FRS) in 1864, and of the Royal Geographical Society (FRGS) in 1870. He was made a GCMG on 9 March 1874.

== Legacy ==
The Navarre diggings, a small Victorian gold field was named Barkly on 1 November 1861 in his honour.

The South African towns of Barkly East and Barkly West, and the Barkly Pass are named after him.

Several notable streets were named after him including a main civic street in Ballarat East named Barkly Street for him in 1858 along with the main street of Ararat, Victoria also named Barkly Street. Barkly Street in Mentone, Victoria was named for him though later renamed Rogers Street. The Barkly River, located in the alpine region of Victoria, within the Alpine National Park, is named in honour of Barkly. The bell atop the tower of the Ballarat Fire Brigade, on the corner of Barkly & East streets, Ballarat East was christened the "Lady Barkly" by the brigades Captain in August 1863.

The Rutherglen Recreation Reserve was named "Barkly Park" in May, 1895 at the Reserves Trustees' Meeting in recognition of the pioneer name given to the western end of Rutherglen and named after the former Victorian Governor, Sir Henry Barkly.

the Barkly Tableland a region in the Central Eastern part of the Northern Territory which extends into Western Queensland was named by explorer William Landsborough in December 1861 in honour of Barkly.

the Barkly Highway which extends from Threeways in the Northern Territory to Mount Isa in Queensland which runs through the Barkly Tableland was also named in honour of Barkly.

== Publications ==
- MacMillan, Mona (1969). "Sir Henry Barkly, mediator and moderator, 1815-1898". Balkema: Cape Town.
- Barkly, Sir Henry, KCB, GCMG, The Earlier House of Berkeley, published in Transactions of the Bristol and Gloucestershire Archaeological Society, Vol. 8, 1883-84, pp. 193–223
- Barkly, Henry (1888). John, Maclean (ed.). "Testa de Nevill Returns for the County of Gloucester". Transactions of the Bristol and Gloucestershire Archaeological Society. 12. Bristol and Gloucestershire Archaeological Society: 235–290.

Parliament of the United Kingdom
Preceded by Charles Greenaway; George Arkwright	Member of Parliament for Leominster; 1845–1849; With: George Arkwright	Succeeded by Frederick Peel; George Arkwright
Government offices
Preceded by Henry Light	Governor of British Guiana; 1849–1853	Succeeded by Philip Wodehouse
Preceded by Sir Charles Edward Grey	Governor of Jamaica; 1853–1856	Succeeded by Edward Wells Bell
Preceded by Sir Charles Hotham	Governor of Victoria; 1856–1863	Succeeded by Sir Charles Darling
Preceded by Sir William Stevenson	Governor of Mauritius; 1863–1870	Succeeded by Sir Arthur Hamilton-Gordon
Preceded by Sir Philip Wodehouse	Governor of Cape Colony; 1870–1877	Succeeded by Henry Bartle Frere
