= John Bisset (British Army officer, born 1819) =

British Army officer

General Sir John Bisset KCMG CB
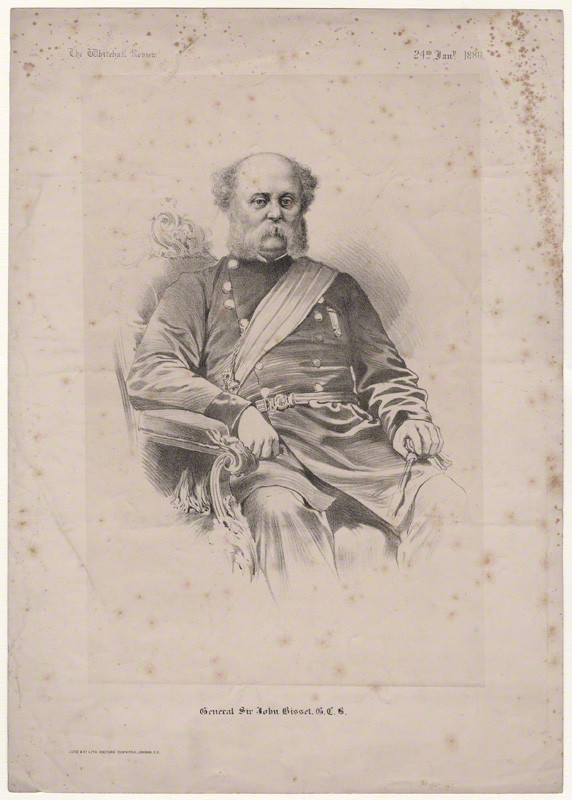
- Born: 25 December 1819
- Died: 25 March 1894 (aged 74)
- Military career
- Allegiance: United Kingdom
- Branch: British Army
- Rank: General
- Commands: Cape Mounted Riflemen
- Conflicts: 6th, 7th and 8th Frontier wars
- Awards: Knight Commander of the Order of St Michael and St George; Companion of the Order of the Bath

General Sir John Jarvis Bisset KCMG CB (25 December 1819 – 25 March 1894) was a British Army officer who became colonel of the 106th Regiment of Foot.

== Family ==
He was the son of Captain Alexander Bissett, flag lieutenant to Lord Nelson, and Alicia Tyndal of Jersey. He married firstly Charlotte Morgan and secondly Frances Hannah Bridge. They had six children; the third, Amy Morgan, married Charles Hoskins Master. The second marriage produced one child.

== Military career ==
Bisset arrived in South Africa as a child in 1820 and, having been commissioned as an ensign in the Cape Mounted Riflemen in 1835, fought in the 6th, 7th and 8th Frontier wars. He became Commanding officer of his regiment, brigade major in 1847 and was severely wounded in the battle of Boomah Pass and went on to be acting Governor of Natal in 1865. He also became colonel of the 106th Regiment of Foot. In 1861, he was appointed to command a brigade of Imperial troops in Canada. Between 1869 and 1873, he was commandant at Gibraltar. In 1877, he was promoted to lieutenant general and appointed a Knight Commander of the Order of St Michael and St George. He moved to the retired list in 1881.

== Books ==
- Bisset, Major-General. (1875). Sport and War. London: John Murray.
