= Willem Cornelis Janse van Rensburg =

President of the South African Republic (1818–1865)

Willem Janse van Rensburg

2nd President of the Executive Council of the South African Republic
- In office 18 April 1862 – 10 May 1864
- Preceded by: Stephanus Schoeman (acting)
- Succeeded by: Marthinus Wessel Pretorius

Personal details
- Born: 16 May 1818 Beaufort West, Cape Colony
- Died: 13 August 1865 (aged 47) Rustenburg, Transvaal Republic
- Resting place: Heroes' Acre, Pretoria

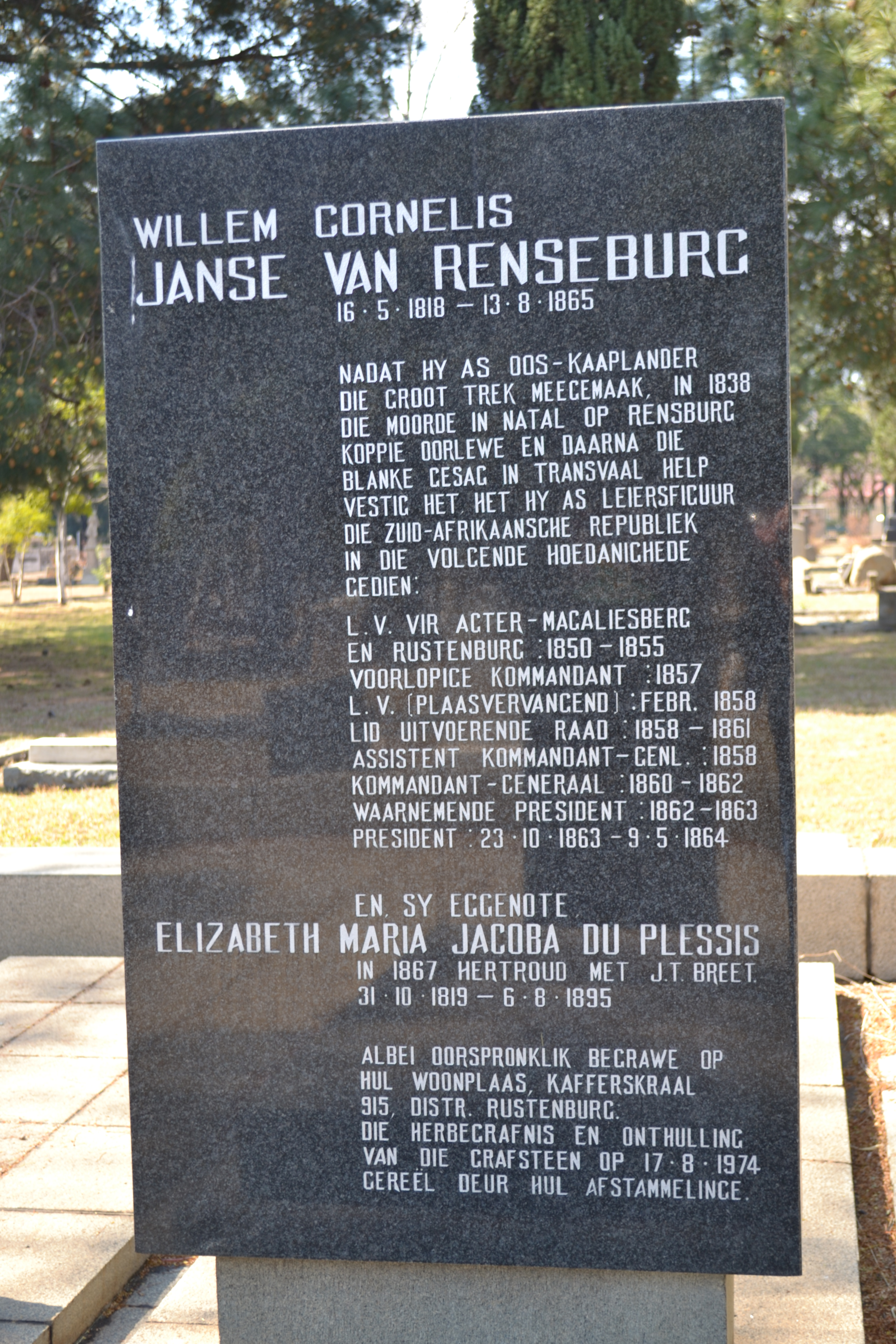
Van Rensburg's grave in the Heroes' Acre, Pretoria.

Willem Cornelis Janse van Rensburg (16 May 1818 – 13 August 1865) was the second President of the Executive Council of the South African Republic, from 18 April 1862 until 10 May 1864.
