= Philip Wodehouse (colonial administrator) =

Indian politician

Sir Philip Wodehouse GCSI KCB
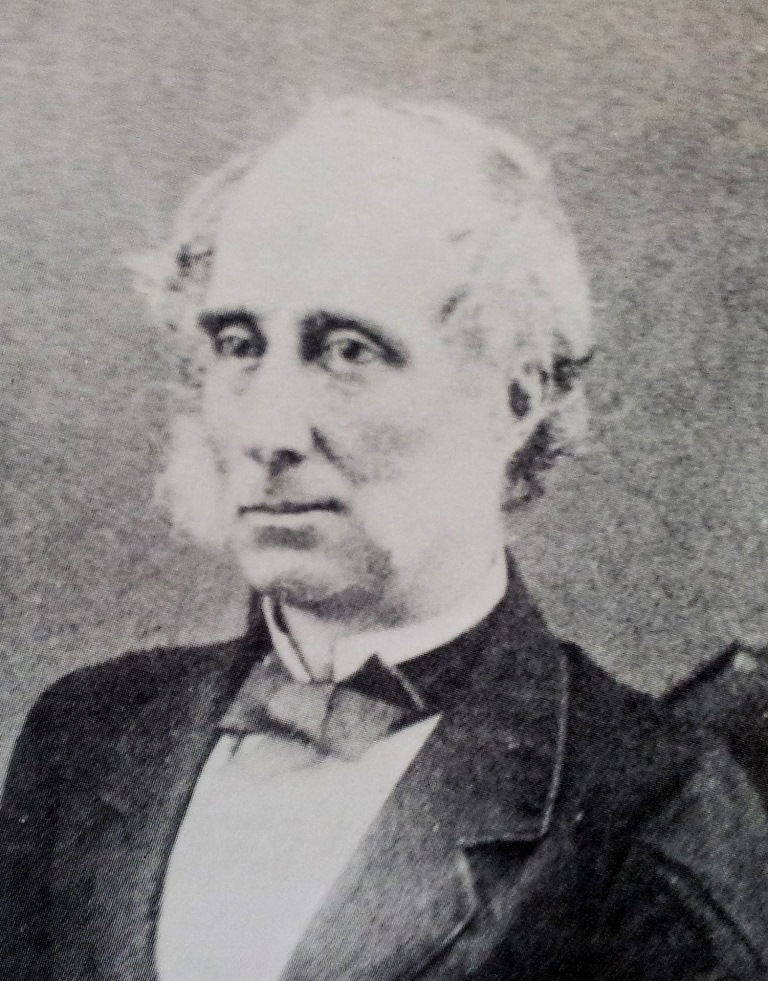
- Governor Sir Philip Wodehouse
- Born: Philip Edmond Wodehouse; 27 February 1811; Sennowe Lodge, Norfolk, England
- Died: 25 October 1887 (aged 76); Queen Anne's Mansions, Westminster, Middlesex, England
- Occupation(s): Civil servant, colonial governor

Sir Philip Edmond Wodehouse, GCSI, KCB (27 February 1811 – 25 October 1887), was a British colonial administrator.

== Background ==
Wodehouse was the eldest child of Edmond Wodehouse and his wife and first cousin Lucy Wodehouse. His paternal grandfather Thomas Wodehouse and maternal grandfather Reverend Philip Wodehouse were both younger sons of Sir Armine Wodehouse, 5th Baronet, whose eldest son John Wodehouse, 1st Baron Wodehouse, was the ancestor of the earls of Kimberley.

== Career ==
Wodehouse entered the Ceylon Civil Service at an early age, and later served as superintendent of British Honduras from 1851 to 1854. He then served as Governor of British Guiana from 1854 to 1861, where his unpopular measures (such as imposing a head tax) generated enormous riots that even saw him and his retinue attacked and pelted.

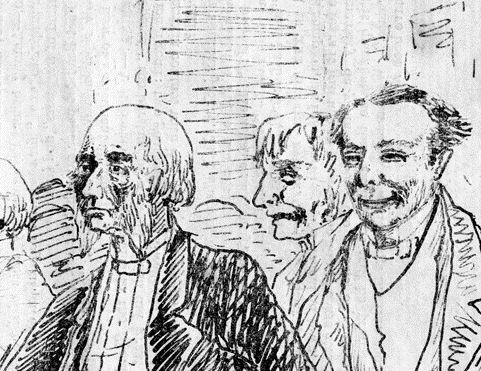
Governor Wodehouse depicted in a local Cape newspaper with his chiefs of staff.

In 1861, he was appointed Governor of the Cape Colony and British High Commissioner for Southern Africa, taking over from Sir George Grey who had been recalled for disobeying imperial orders.

His High Commission in Southern Africa was initially dominated by the dispute between the neighbouring states of Basutoland and the Orange Free State but, via his arbitration, he managed to bring Basutoland under British control.

His High Commission was also overshadowed, throughout its duration, by a growing movement in the Cape for a degree of independence under a system of "responsible government". The local Cape Parliament was elected by a system of multi-racial franchise, but had no executive power. The movement for "responsible government" (a democratically accountable executive) had immense local popularity, fueled by what was perceived to be the ineptitude of British imperial rule. Autocratic and unpopular, Wodehouse fought this growing independence movement throughout his governorship, even attempting to dismantle the Cape Parliament and bring the Cape back under his direct rule as a crown colony. Increasingly despotic, he, in turn, faced increasingly fierce opposition, led by local leader John Molteno, until he was recalled in 1870, amid great local celebration.

He was then Governor of Bombay from 1872 to 1877, when he retired from public life. He was made a CB in 1860, a KCB in 1862 and a GCSI in 1876.

== Personal life ==
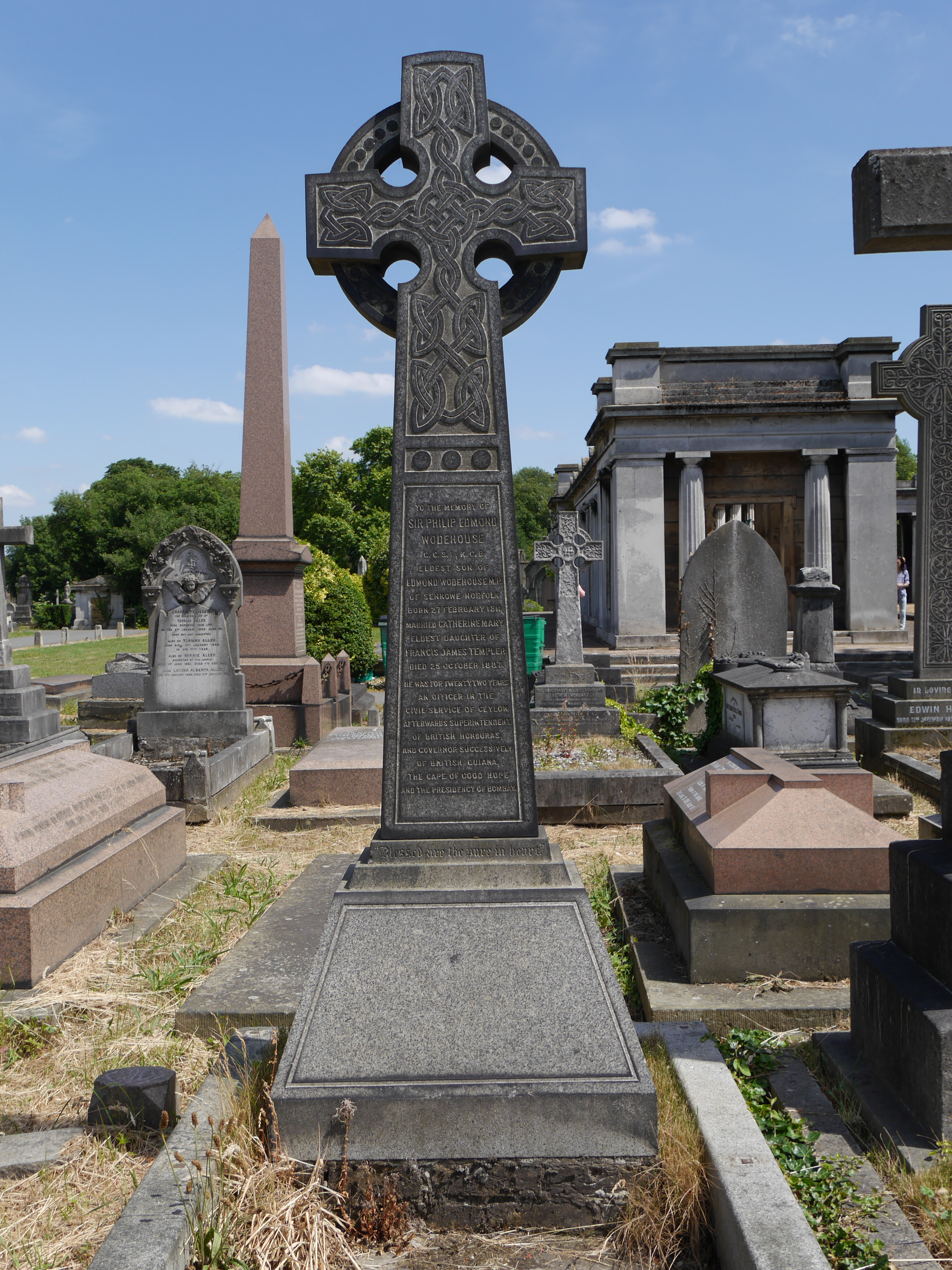
Monument, Kensal Green Cemetery

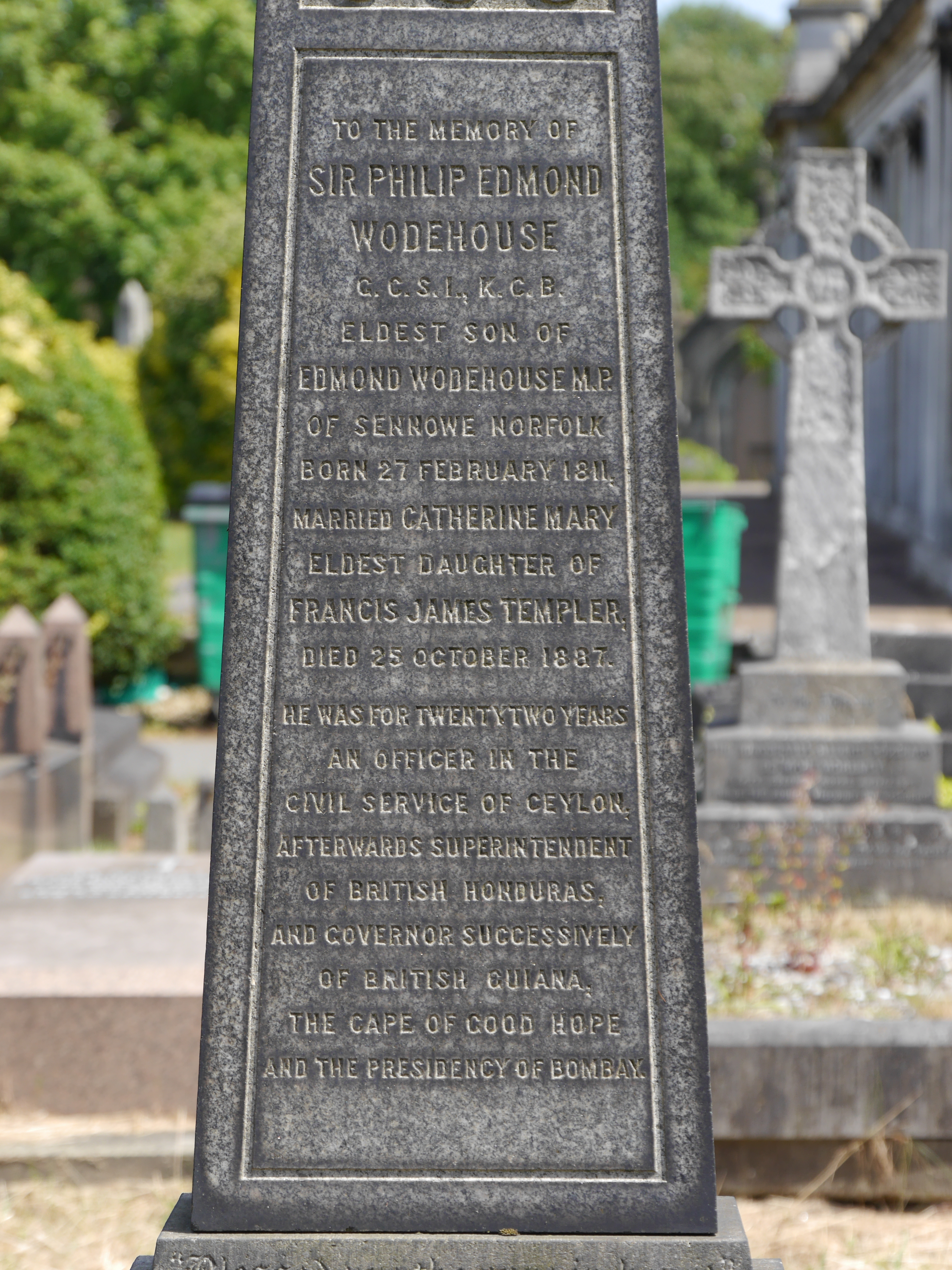
Monument detail, Kensal Green Cemetery

Wodehouse married Katherine Mary Templer, daughter of Francis Templer, in 1833. They had one child, Edmond Wodehouse, who became Member of Parliament for Bath. Wodehouse died in October 1887, at the age of 76. He is buried in Kensal Green Cemetery.

== Legacy ==
Wodehouse Peak, a prominent highpoint in Golden Gate Highlands National Park is named after Philip Wodehouse, supposedly due to his suggestion that the border between the Boers and Basotho should follow the Rooiberge range. This suggestion, however, dates from 1845 when Sir Peregrine Maitland governed the Cape, well before the 1861 governorship of Wodehouse. Wodehouse presided over the Convention of Aliwal-North which formally established the boundaries of Basotholand.

Government offices
Preceded by Charles St. John Fancourt	Superintendent of British Honduras; 1851–1854	Succeeded by William Stevenson
Preceded by Sir Henry Barkly	Governor of British Guiana; 1854–1861	Succeeded by Sir Francis Hincks
Preceded by William Walker (acting)	Governor of British Guiana; 1854–1861	Succeeded by Sir Francis Hincks
Preceded by Sir George Grey	Governor of the Cape Colony; 1861–1870	Succeeded by Charles Craufurd Hay (acting)
Preceded by Robert Wynyard (acting)	Governor of the Cape Colony; 1861–1870	Succeeded by Sir Henry Barkly
Preceded by Sir Seymour Vesey-FitzGerald	Governor of Bombay; 1872–1877	Succeeded by Sir Richard Temple
