= Johannes Brand =

South African politician (1823–1888)

Sir Johannes Henricus Brand GCMG
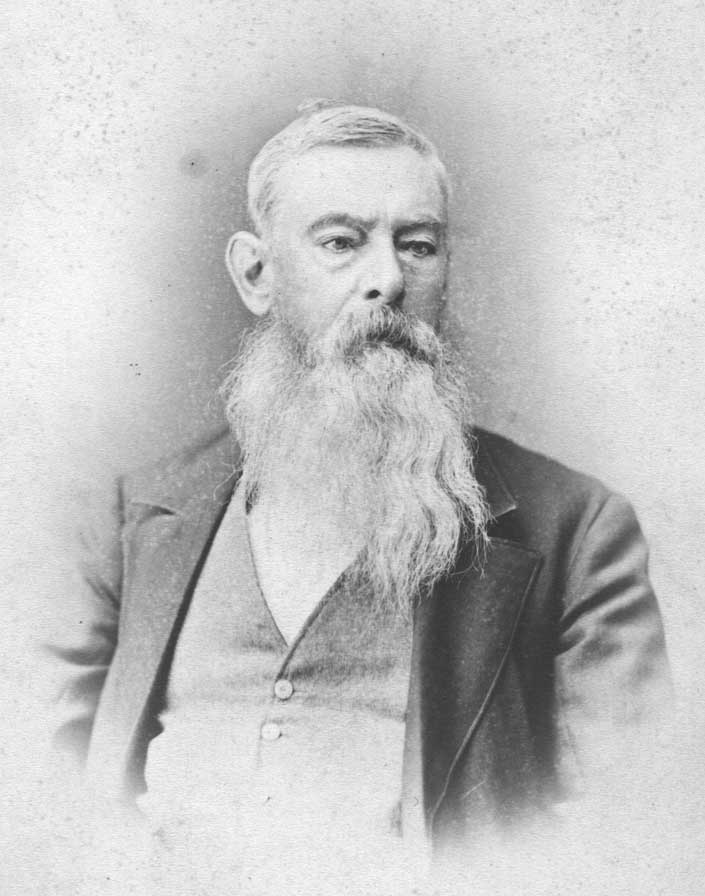
- Brand in 1880

4th State President of the Orange Free State
- In office 2 February 1864 – 14 July 1888
- Preceded by: M.W. Pretorius
- Succeeded by: F.W. Reitz

Personal details
- Born: 6 December 1823 Cape Town, Cape Colony (now Western Cape, South Africa)
- Died: 14 July 1888 (aged 64) Bloemfontein, Orange Free State (now Free State)
- Spouse: Johanna Zastron
- Children: 11 (8 sons, 3 daughters)
- Education: South African College, Leiden University
- Occupation: lawyer, university professor

Sir Johannes Henricus Brand, GCMG (popularly known as Sir Jan Brand and sometimes as Sir John Henry Brand or Jan Henrick Brand; 6 December 1823 – 14 July 1888) was a South African Boer lawyer and politician who served as the fourth state president of the Orange Free State, from 2 February 1864 until his death in 1888. He was the son of Sir Christoffel Joseph Brand (1797–1875), speaker of the Cape legislative assembly, and Catharina Fredrica Küchler.

Johannes Brand married in 1851 to Johanna Sibella Zastron, a daughter of the Registrar of Deeds in Cape Town. The couple had 8 sons and 3 daughters.

== Life history ==
Johannes Brand was born in Cape Town, and was educated at the South African College in that city. Continuing his studies at Leiden in the Netherlands, he took the degree of D.C.L. in 1845. He continued his law studies in Britain and was called to the English bar at the Inner Temple in 1849.

After his return to South Africa, Brand settled in Cape Town, where he practised as an advocate in the Supreme Court of the Cape of Good Hope until 1863.

In 1858 Brand was appointed professor of law in the South African College. As a young Member of the Cape Parliament, he became a keen supporter of John Molteno's "Responsible Government" movement, which advocated greater independence from Britain. However, finding its principles too moderate, he decided to emigrate to the Orange Free State, in solidarity with its strong republican ideals.

He was elected president of the Orange Free State in 1863, and subsequently re-elected for five year terms in 1869, 1874, 1879 and 1884. In 1864 he resisted the pressure of the Basuto on the Free State boundary, and after vainly endeavouring to induce Moshoeshoe, the Basuto chief, to keep his people within bounds, he took up arms against them in 1865. This first war ended in the Treaty of Thaba Bosigo, signed on 3 April 1866; and a second war, which ended in the Treaty of Aliwal North, concluded on 12 February 1869. In 1871 he opposed the British annexation of the town of Kimberley without success.

In 1871, Brand was solicited by a large party to become president of the South African Republic (Transvaal), and thus unite the two Boer republics in what would later become part of South Africa; but as the project was hostile to Great Britain he declined to do so, and maintained his constant policy of neutrality towards England, where his merits were recognised in 1882 when he was awarded the Knight Grand Cross of the Order of St Michael and St George.

Johannes Brand was deeply religious and irreproachable in both public and private life. He was extremely popular with the burghers of the Orange Free State. Brand's expression "alles zal recht komen als elkeen zijn plicht doet" (all will be well if everyone does his duty) has entered the Afrikaans language as a well-known and often used saying. After his death a statue funded by public subscription was erected in Bloemfontein. The main road in the Bloemfontein city centre was named President Brand Street in his honour.

Brand was a South African Freemason.
