= Marthinus Wessel Pretorius =

Founder of Pretoria, South Africa (1819-1901)

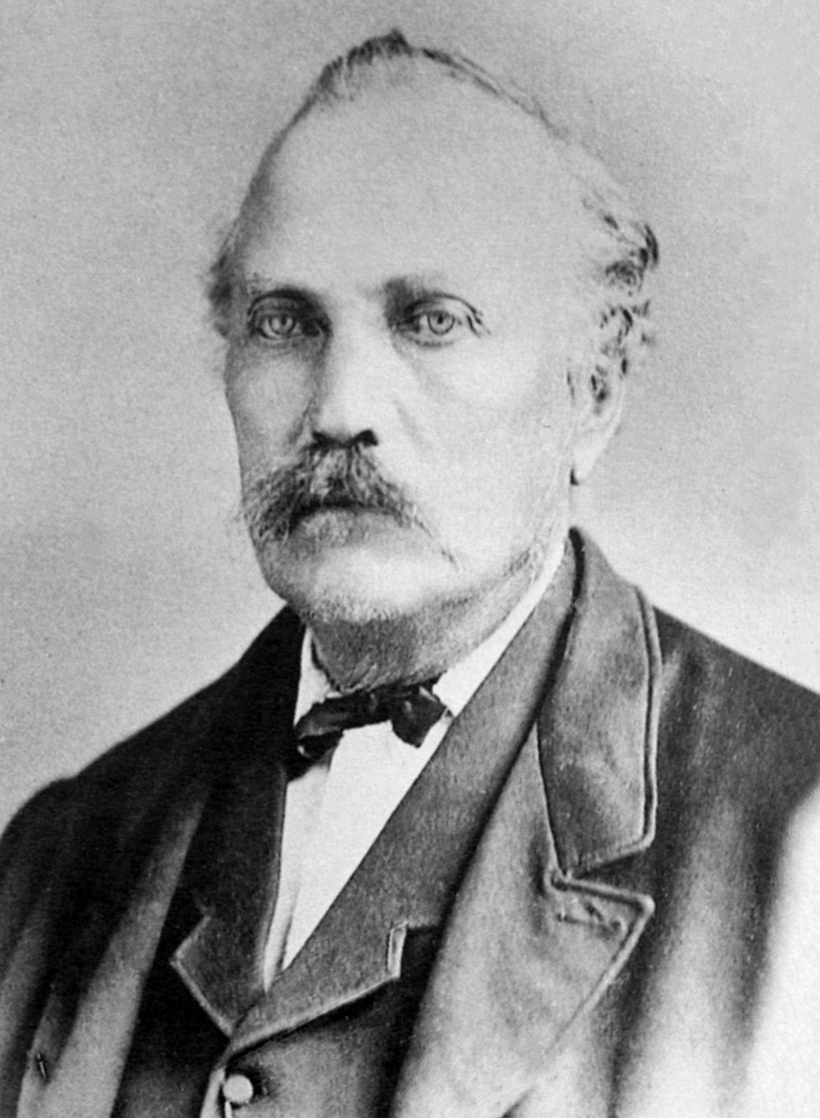

Member of the Triumvirate
- In office 8 August 1881 – 9 May 1883 Serving with Paul Kruger and Piet Joubert
- Preceded by: The Viscount Wolseley; As Governor of the Transvaal
- Succeeded by: Paul Kruger; As President of the South African Republic

President of the South African Republic
- In office 22 October 1866 – 20 November 1871
- Preceded by: Willem Cornelis Janse van Rensburg
- Succeeded by: Daniel Jacobus Erasmus

President of the Executive Council of the South African Republic
- In office 6 January 1857 – 15 September 1860
- Preceded by: Office established
- Succeeded by: Johannes Hermanus Grobler
- In office 10 May 1864 – 22 October 1866
- Preceded by: Willem Cornelis Janse van Rensburg; As Acting President
- Succeeded by: Daniël Jacobus Erasmus; As Acting President

State President of the Orange Free State
- In office 8 February 1860 – 20 June 1863
- Preceded by: Jacobus Nicolaas Boshoff
- Succeeded by: Johannes Brand

Personal details
- Born: Marthinus Wessel Pretorius; 17 September 1819 Graaff Reinet, Cape Colony
- Died: 19 May 1901 (aged 81) Potchefstroom, South African Republic
- Resting place: Potchefstroom, North West, South Africa
- Parent: Andries Pretorius (father)
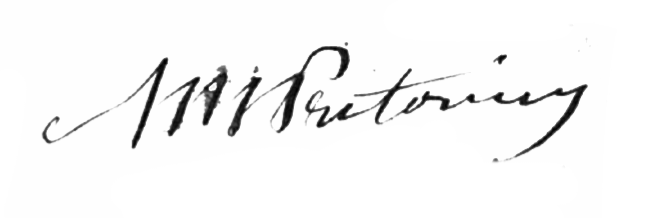
- Signature

Military service
- Allegiance: South African Republic; Orange Free State; Voortrekkers
- Rank: Commandant General
- Commands: Transvaal Commandos

Marthinus Wessel Pretorius (17 September 1819 – 19 May 1901) was a South African political leader. An Afrikaner (or "Boer"), he helped establish the South African Republic (Zuid-Afrikaansche Republiek or ZAR; also referred to as Transvaal), was the first president of the ZAR, and also compiled its constitution.

He was born in Cape Colony, then accompanied his father, the Voortrekker leader Andries Pretorius in the migration to the interior. After the death of his father in 1853, he was appointed to succeed him as Commandant-General of the Boer settlers around the city of Potchefstroom and moved from his farm, Kalkheuwel, near Broederstroom, to Potchefstroom. He was Commandant-General of Potchefstroom from 1853 through 1856.

== Political offices ==
In 1857, the nascent ZAR elected Pretorius as its first President. However, in 1859, in an effort to create closer bonds with the Orange Free State, he also became State President of the Orange Free State. This created tension in the ZAR, and in 1860, he resigned as President of the ZAR. After serving as President of the Orange Free State until 1863, Pretorius was re-elected President of the ZAR in 1864, and served a second term until 1871. Pretorius also served as joint head of state (in the "triumvirate") between 1880 and 1883.

He died on 19 May 1901 at Potchefstroom.

Pretorius was an important South African Freemason.

== Founding of the city of Pretoria ==
In an endeavour to establish a new town, he bought two farms named Elandspoort and Daspoort between 1854 and 1855, on which he founded the city of Pretoria in 1855.

Ds. van der Hoff originally named the first church congregation in this area Pretoria Philadelphia (Pretorius Friendship), in honour of Pretorius' father. Later, the town took on the shortened name of Pretoria.

Five years later the capital of the ZAR was moved from Potchefstroom to Pretoria.
