= High Commissioner for Southern Africa =

- Flag of the high commissioner for Southern Africa, 1907–1931

- Flag of the high commissioner for Southern Africa, 1931–1968
- Formation: 27 January 1847
- First holder: Sir Henry Pottinger
- Final holder: Sir Hugh Stephenson
- Abolished: 31 July 1964

The British office of high commissioner for Southern Africa was responsible for governing British possessions in Southern Africa, latterly the protectorates of Basutoland (now Lesotho), the Bechuanaland Protectorate (now Botswana) and Swaziland (now Eswatini), as well as for relations with autonomous governments in the area.

The office was combined with that of Governor of Cape Colony from 1847 to 1901, with that of the governor of Transvaal Colony 1901 to 1910, and with that of Governor-General of South Africa from 1910 to 1931. The British government appointed the Governor-General as High Commissioner under a separate commission. In addition to responsibility for Basutoland, Bechuanaland and Swaziland, he held reserve powers concerning the interests of the native population of Southern Rhodesia. The post was abolished on 1 August 1964.

== List of officeholders ==
Name	Began	Ended
Sir Henry Pottinger	27 January 1847	1 December 1847
Sir Harry Smith	1 December 1847	31 March 1852
George Cathcart	31 March 1852	26 May 1854
Charles Henry Darling (acting)	26 May 1854	5 December 1854
Sir George Edward Grey	5 December 1854	15 August 1861
Robert Henry Wynyard (acting)	15 August 1861	15 January 1862
Sir Philip Wodehouse	15 January 1862	20 May 1870
Charles Craufurd Hay (acting)	20 May 1870	31 December 1870
Sir Henry Barkly	31 December 1870	31 March 1877
Sir Bartle Frere	31 March 1877	15 September 1880
Henry Hugh Clifford (acting)	15 September 1880	27 September 1880
Sir George Strahan (acting)	27 September 1880	22 January 1881
Sir Hercules Robinson	22 January 1881	1 May 1889
Henry Augustus Smyth (acting)	1 May 1889	13 December 1889
Sir Henry Brougham Loch	13 December 1889	30 May 1895
Sir Hercules Robinson (from 1896, the Lord Rosmead)	30 May 1895	21 April 1897
William Goodenough (acting)	21 April 1897	5 May 1897
Sir Alfred Milner	5 May 1897	May 1905
William Palmer, 2nd Earl of Selborne	May 1905	31 May 1910
Sir Walter Hely-Hutchinson (acting, in the absence of Lord Selborne)	1909	1909
Herbert Gladstone, 1st Viscount Gladstone	31 May 1910	8 September 1914
Sydney Buxton, 1st Earl Buxton	8 September 1914	17 July 1920
Beresford Cecil Molyneux Carter (acting High Commissioner only with Sir James Rose Innes acting Governor General from 17 July 1920)	3 September 1920	20 November 1920
Prince Arthur of Connaught	20 November 1920	5 December 1923
Rudolph Bentinck (acting High Commissioner only with Sir James Rose Innes acting Governor General from 5 December 1923)	10 December 1923	21 January 1924
Alexander Cambridge, 1st Earl of Athlone	21 January 1924	26 January 1931
George Villiers, 6th Earl of Clarendon	26 January 1931	6 April 1931
Sir Herbert Stanley	6 April 1931	6 January 1935
Sir William Henry Clark	7 January 1935	3 January 1940
Sir Edward John Harding	3 January 1940	3 January 1941
Sir Walter Huggard (acting)	3 January 1941	24 May 1941
William Ormsby-Gore, 4th Baron Harlech	24 May 1941	13 May 1944
Harold Eddey Priestman (acting)	13 May 1944	23 June 1944
Sir Walter Huggard (acting)	23 June 1944	27 October 1944
Sir Evelyn Baring	27 October 1944	1 October 1951
Sir John Le Rougetel	2 October 1951	2 February 1955
Sir Percivale Liesching	4 March 1955	December 1958
Sir John Maud	15 January 1959	1963
Sir Hugh Southern Stephenson	1963	31 July 1964

== The high commission territories ==
The high commissioner was responsible for governing the following territories, in each case represented by a resident commissioner:

- Basutoland, gained independence as Lesotho on 4 October 1966
- Bechuanaland Protectorate, gained independence as Botswana on 30 September 1966
- Swaziland, gained independence on 6 September 1968 (now Eswatini)

== See also ==
- List of high commissioners of the United Kingdom to South Africa
- Governor of Hong Kong - post held by two High Commissioners for Southern Africa
