= State President of the South African Republic =

Head of state

- Staatspresident van de Zuid-Afrikaansche Republiek
- Arms of the South African Republic

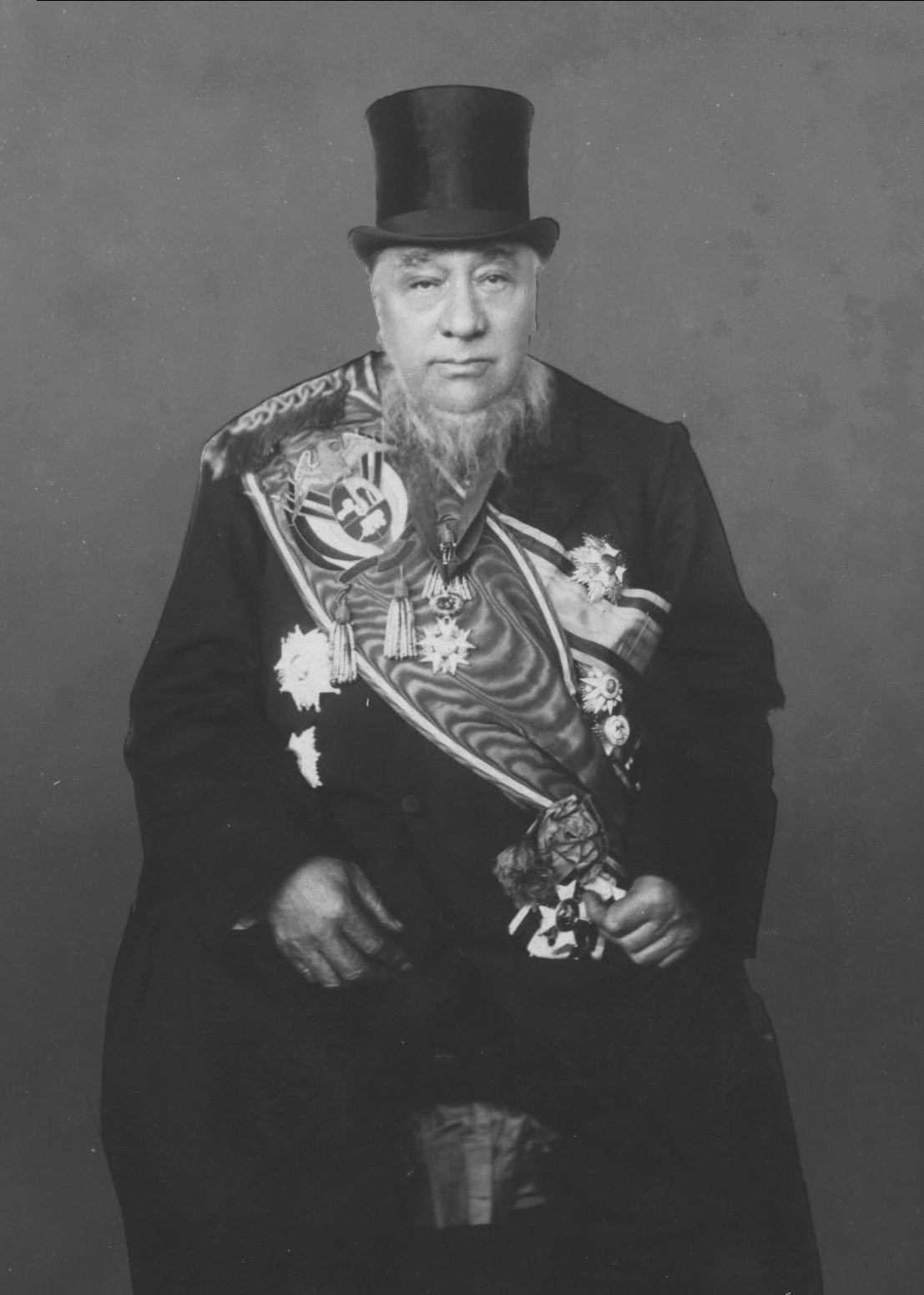
- Longest serving Paul Kruger; 9 May 1883 – 31 May 1902
- Style: His Excellency
- Residence: Kruger House, Pretoria (Kruger)
- Formation: 22 October 1866
- First holder: Marthinus Wessel Pretorius
- Final holder: Paul Kruger
- Abolished: 31 May 1902
- Deputy: Vice State President of the South African Republic

The state president of the South African Republic had the executive authority in the South African Republic. According to the constitution of 1871, executive power was vested in the president, who was responsible to the Volksraad. The president was elected for a term of five years and was eligible for re-election. The president had to be Burgher and also qualified to vote for the First Volksraad elections, over 30 years old, a member of a Protestant church, and never convicted of a dishonourable offence.

The title before 1866 was Dutch: President van de Zuid-Afrikaansche Republiek and after 1866 Dutch: Staatspresident der Zuid-Afrikaansche Republiek).

The country was referred to as the Transvaal Republic by the British.

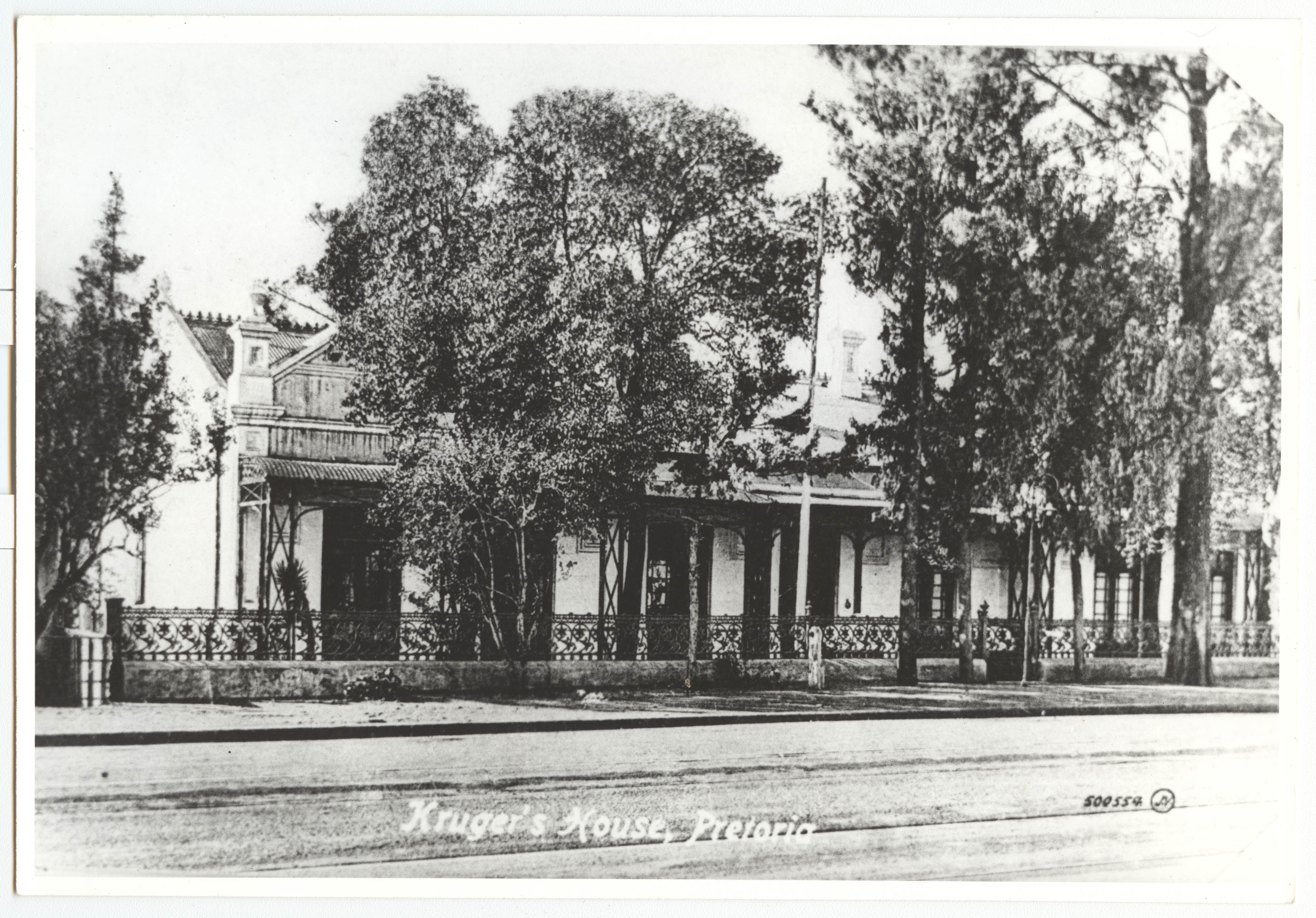
Kruger House in Pretoria

== List of officeholders ==
No.	Portrait	Name (Birth–Death)	Term of office		
No.	Portrait	Name (Birth–Death)	Took office	Left office	Time in office
Presidents of the Executive Council (1857–1866)
1		Marthinus Wessel Pretorius (1819–1901)	6 January 1857	15 September 1860	3 years, 253 days
–		Johannes Hermanus Grobler (1813–1892); Acting	15 September 1860	6 December 1860 (ousted)	82 days
Civil War (1861–1864)
–		Stephanus Schoeman (1810–1890); Acting (Note: After 1862, the leader of rebel forces.)	6 December 1860	17 April 1862	1 year, 132 days
2		Willem Cornelis Janse van Rensburg (1818–1865)	18 April 1862	23 October 1863	1 year, 188 days
2		Willem Cornelis Janse van Rensburg (1818–1865)	23 October 1863	10 May 1864	200 days
(1)		Marthinus Wessel Pretorius (1819–1901)	10 May 1864	22 October 1866	2 years, 165 days
State Presidents (1866–1902)
1		Marthinus Wessel Pretorius (1819–1901)	22 October 1866 (Note: The office of the State President was created by constitutional amendment approved at session of the Volksraad on 22 October 1866.)	20 November 1871	5 years, 29 days
–		Daniel Jacobus Erasmus (1830–1913); Acting	21 November 1871	1 July 1872	223 days
2		Thomas François Burgers (1834–1881)	1 July 1872	12 April 1877	4 years, 285 days
First Boer War (12 April 1877 – 8 August 1881); First British annexation (Transvaal Colony) (Note: The government of the South African Republic resumed to exercise its functions in accordance with the resolution of the Volksraad of 13 December 1880; Transvaal Territory was granted self-government in accordance with the Pretoria Convention, subject to the suzerainty of the British Crown, on 8 August 1881.)
–		Triumvirate: Paul Kruger (1825–1904); Marthinus Wessel Pretorius (1819–1901); Piet Joubert (1834–1900)	13 December 1880	9 May 1883	2 years, 147 days
3		Paul Kruger (1825–1904)	9 May 1883	31 May 1902 (Note: Left the Republic for Europe on 10 September 1900.)	19 years, 22 days
Second Boer War (11 October 1899 – 31 May 1902)
–		Schalk Willem Burger (1852–1918); Acting for absent Kruger	10 September 1900	31 May 1902	1 year, 263 days
Post abolished with the Treaty of Vereeniging; Second British annexation (Transvaal Colony)

== Last election ==
Candidate	Votes	%
Paul Kruger	12,858	69.08
Schalk Willem Burger	3,753	20.16
Piet Joubert	2,001	10.75
Total	18,612	100.00
Source: Annual Register

== See also ==
- State President of the Orange Free State
- State Secretary of the South African Republic
- State Attorney of the South African Republic
