= List of governors of British South African colonies =

Map of South Africa in July 1885, prior to the Second Boer War. It is showing British possessions and protectorates, the two Boer Republics (ZAR and Orange Free State), besides German South West Africa and Portuguese Mozambique.

This article lists the governors of British South African colonies, including the colonial prime ministers. It encompasses the period from 1797 to 1910, when present-day South Africa was divided into four British colonies namely: Cape Colony (preceded by Dutch Cape Colony), Natal Colony, Orange River Colony and Transvaal Colony.

After the colonies were disestablished as a result of the creation of the Union of South Africa, the area was divided into four provinces of the Union: Cape Province, Natal Province, Orange Free State Province and Transvaal Province.

== Cape Colony ==
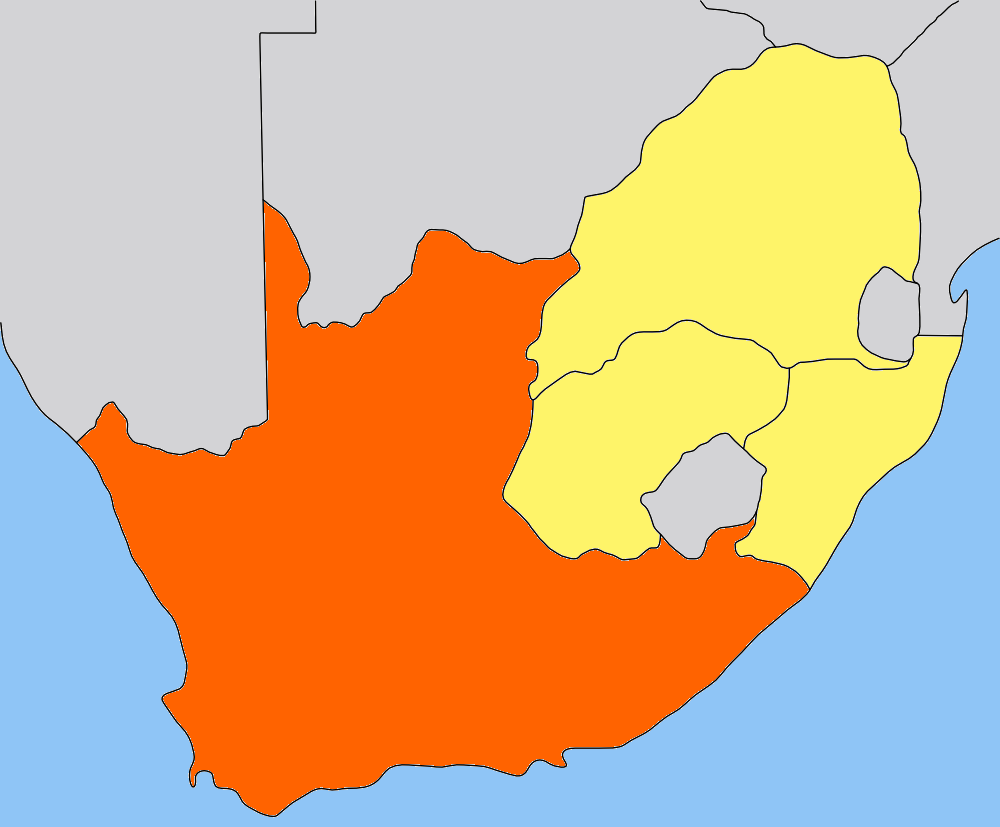
Map of the Cape Colony (orange) within South Africa (yellow).

=== Governors ===
Flag of the governor of the Cape Colony (1876–1910).

Tenure	Portrait	Incumbent	Notes
Governors
5 May 1797 to 20 November 1798		George Macartney, 1st Earl Macartney	Known for the 1793 Macartney Embassy to China
20 November 1798 to 9 December 1799		Francis Dundas	1st time, acting
10 December 1799 to 20 April 1801		Sir George Yonge, 5th Baronet	
21 April 1801 to 20 February 1803		Francis Dundas	2nd time, acting
Commissioner-general
21 February 1803 to 25 September 1804		Jacob Abraham de Mist	Represented the Batavian Republic
Governors
1 March 1803 to 18 January 1806		Jan Willem Janssens	Represented the Batavian Republic
10 January 1806 to 17 January 1807		Sir David Baird, 1st Baronet	Military governor, acting
17 January 1807 to 21 May 1807		Henry George Grey	1st time, acting
22 May 1807 to 4 July 1811		Du Pré Alexander, 2nd Earl of Caledon	
5 July 1811 to 5 September 1811		Henry George Grey	2nd time, acting
6 September 1811 to 6 April 1814		John Cradock, 1st Baron Howden	
18 October 1813 to 7 January 1814		Robert Meade	Acting for Cradock; son of Theodosia, Countess of Clanwilliam
6 April 1814 to 5 March 1826		Lord Charles Somerset	
13 January 1820 to 30 November 1821		Sir Rufane Shaw Donkin	Acting for Somerset
5 March 1826 to 9 September 1828		Richard Bourke	Acting
9 September 1828 to 10 August 1833		Sir Galbraith Lowry Cole	
10 August 1833 to 16 January 1834		Thomas Francis Wade	Acting (for D'Urban from 10 January 1834)
10 January 1834 to 20 January 1838		Sir Benjamin D'Urban	
22 January 1838 to 18 March 1844		Sir George Thomas Napier	
18 March 1844 to 27 January 1847		Sir Peregrine Maitland	
Governors and high commissioners for Southern Africa
27 January 1847 to 1 December 1847		Sir Henry Pottinger	
1 December 1847 to 31 March 1852		Sir Harry Smith, 1st Baronet	
31 March 1852 to 26 May 1854		George Cathcart	
26 May 1854 to 5 December 1854		Charles Henry Darling	Acting
5 December 1854 to 15 August 1861		Sir George Grey	
20 August 1859 to 4 July 1860		Robert Wynyard	1st time, acting for Grey
15 August 1861 to 15 January 1862		Robert Wynyard	2nd time, acting
15 January 1862 to 20 May 1870		Sir Philip Wodehouse	
20 May 1870 to 31 December 1870		Charles Craufurd Hay	Acting
31 December 1870 to 31 March 1877		Sir Henry Barkly	
31 March 1877 to 15 September 1880		Sir Henry Bartle Frere	Known for initiating the Anglo-Zulu War and the First Boer War
15 September 1880 to 27 September 1880		Henry Hugh Clifford	Acting
27 September 1880 to 22 January 1881		Sir George Strahan	Acting
22 January 1881 to 1 May 1889		Sir Hercules Robinson	1st time
30 April 1881 to August 1881		Sir Leicester Smyth	1st time, acting for Robinson
25 April 1883 to 26 March 1884		Sir Leicester Smyth	2nd time, acting for Robinson
7 April 1886 to 7 July 1886		Sir Henry Torrens	Acting for Robinson
1 May 1889 to 13 December 1889		Henry Augustus Smyth	Acting
13 December 1889 to 30 May 1895		Henry Loch, 1st Baron Loch	
14 January 1891 to 1 December 1892		Sir William Gordon Cameron	1st time, acting for Loch
May 1894 to July 1894		Sir William Gordon Cameron	2nd time, acting for Loch
30 May 1895 to 21 April 1897		Sir Hercules Robinson	2nd time; from 10 August 1896, Hercules Robinson, Baron Rosmead
21 April 1897 to 5 May 1897		Sir William Howley Goodenough	Acting
5 May 1897 to 6 March 1901		Alfred Milner, 1st Viscount Milner	
2 November 1898 to 14 February 1899		Sir William Butler	Acting for Milner
6 March 1901 to 31 May 1910		Sir Walter Hely-Hutchinson	
17 June 1909 to 21 September 1909		Sir Henry Scobell	Acting for Hely-Hutchinson

=== Prime ministers ===
Tenure	Portrait	Incumbent	Party	Notes
1 December 1872 to 5 February 1878		John Charles Molteno	n-p	
6 February 1878 to 8 May 1881		John Gordon Sprigg	n-p	1st time
9 May 1881 to 12 May 1884		Thomas Charles Scanlen	n-p	
13 May 1884 to 24 November 1886		Thomas Upington	n-p	
25 November 1886 to 16 July 1890		Sir John Gordon Sprigg	n-p	2nd time
17 July 1890 to 12 January 1896		Cecil Rhodes	n-p	Resigned in the aftermath of the Jameson Raid
13 January 1896 to 13 October 1898		Sir John Gordon Sprigg	n-p	3rd time
13 October 1898 to 17 June 1900		William Schreiner	n-p	
18 June 1900 to 21 February 1904		Sir John Gordon Sprigg	PP	4th time
22 February 1904 to 2 February 1908		Leander Starr Jameson	PP	Leader of the Jameson Raid
3 February 1908 to 31 May 1910		John X. Merriman	SAP	

== Natal Colony ==
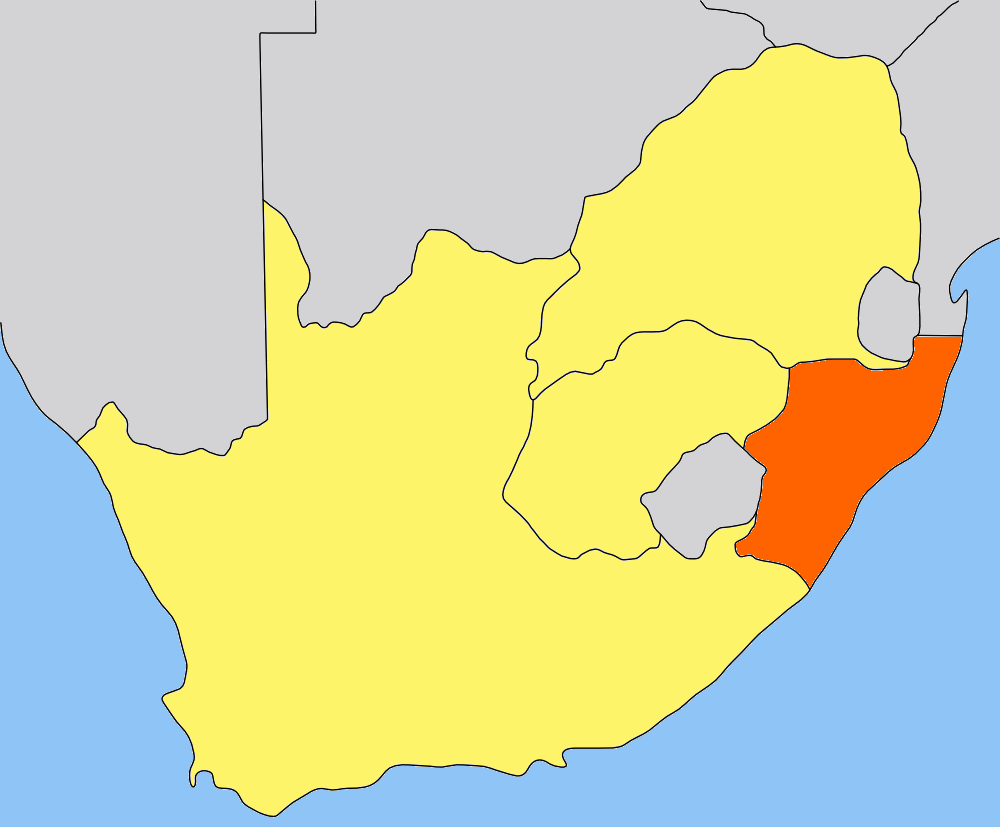
Map of the Natal Colony (orange) within South Africa (yellow).

=== Governors ===
Flag of the governor of the Natal Colony (1905–1907).

Tenure	Portrait	Incumbent	Notes
Special Commissioner
10 May 1843 to 31 May 1844		Henry Cloete	
31 May 1844 to 4 December 1845		direct rule by Cape Colony	During this time, Sir Peregrine Maitland served as the governor of Cape Colony
Lieutenant-governors
4 December 1845 to 1 August 1849		Martin Thomas West	
19 April 1850 to 3 Mar 1855		Benjamin Pine	1st time
3 Mar 1855 to 31 December 1864		John Scott	
31 December 1864 to 26 July 1865		John Maclean	
26 July 1865 to 26 August 1865		John Wellesley Thomas	Acting
26 August 1865 to 24 May 1867		John Jarvis Bisset	Acting
24 May 1867 to 19 July 1872		Robert William Keate	
19 July 1872 to 30 April 1873		Anthony Musgrave	
30 April 1873 to 22 July 1873		Thomas Milles	Acting
22 July 1873 to 1 April 1875		Sir Benjamin Pine	2nd time
1 April 1875 to 3 September 1875		Sir Garnet Joseph Wolseley	Acting
3 September 1875 to 20 April 1880		Sir Henry Ernest Gascoyne Bulwer	1st time
20 April 1880 to 5 May 1880		William Bellairs	Acting
5 May 1880 to 2 July 1880		Henry Hugh Clifford	Acting
Governors
2 July 1880 to 27 February 1881		Sir George Pomeroy Colley	
17 August 1880 to 14 September 1880		Henry Alexander	Acting for Colley
27 February 1881 to 3 April 1881		Sir Evelyn Wood	Acting
3 April 1881 to 9 August 1881		Redvers Buller	Acting
22 December 1881 to 6 March 1882		Charles Mitchell	1st time, acting
6 March 1882 to 23 October 1885		Sir Henry Ernest Gascoyne Bulwer	2nd time
18 February 1886 to 5 June 1889		Sir Arthur Havelock	
1 December 1889 to July 1893		Charles Mitchell	2nd time
July 1893 to 27 September 1893		Francis Seymour Haden	Acting
28 September 1893 to 6 May 1901		Sir Walter Hely-Hutchinson	
13 May 1901 to 7 June 1907		Sir Henry McCallum	
2 September 1907 to 23 December 1909		Sir Matthew Nathan	
17 January 1910 to 31 May 1910		Paul Methuen, 3rd Baron Methuen	

=== Prime ministers ===
Tenure	Portrait	Incumbent	Party	Notes
10 October 1893 to 14 February 1897		Sir John Robinson	n-p	
15 February 1897 to 4 October 1897		Harry Escombe	n-p	
5 October 1897 to 8 June 1899		Sir Henry Binns	n-p	
9 June 1899 to 17 August 1903		Sir Albert Henry Hime	n-p	
18 August 1903 to 16 May 1905		George Morris Sutton	n-p	
16 May 1905 to 28 November 1906		Charles John Smythe	n-p	
28 November 1906 to 28 April 1910		Frederick Moor	n-p	

== Orange River Colony ==
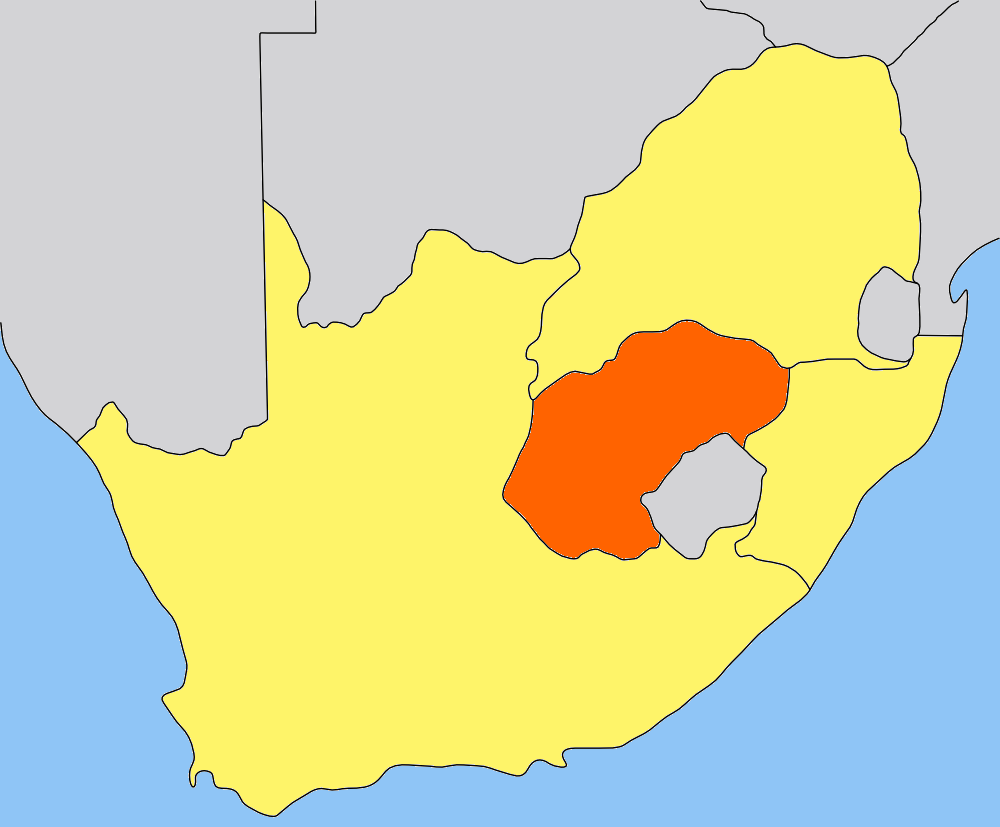
Map of the Orange River Colony (orange) within South Africa (yellow).

=== Governors ===
Flag of the governor of the Orange River Colony (1902–1910).

Tenure	Portrait	Incumbent	Notes
23 June 1902 to 1 April 1905		Alfred Milner, 1st Viscount Milner	Simultaneously served as the governor of Transvaal Colony
2 April 1905 to 7 June 1907		William Palmer, 2nd Earl of Selborne	
7 June 1907 to 31 May 1910		Sir Hamilton Goold-Adams	

=== Prime minister ===
Tenure	Portrait	Incumbent	Party	Notes
27 November 1907 to 31 May 1910		Abraham Fischer	ORU	Later served as the Minister of the Interior Affairs of South Africa, from 1912 to 1913

== Transvaal Colony ==
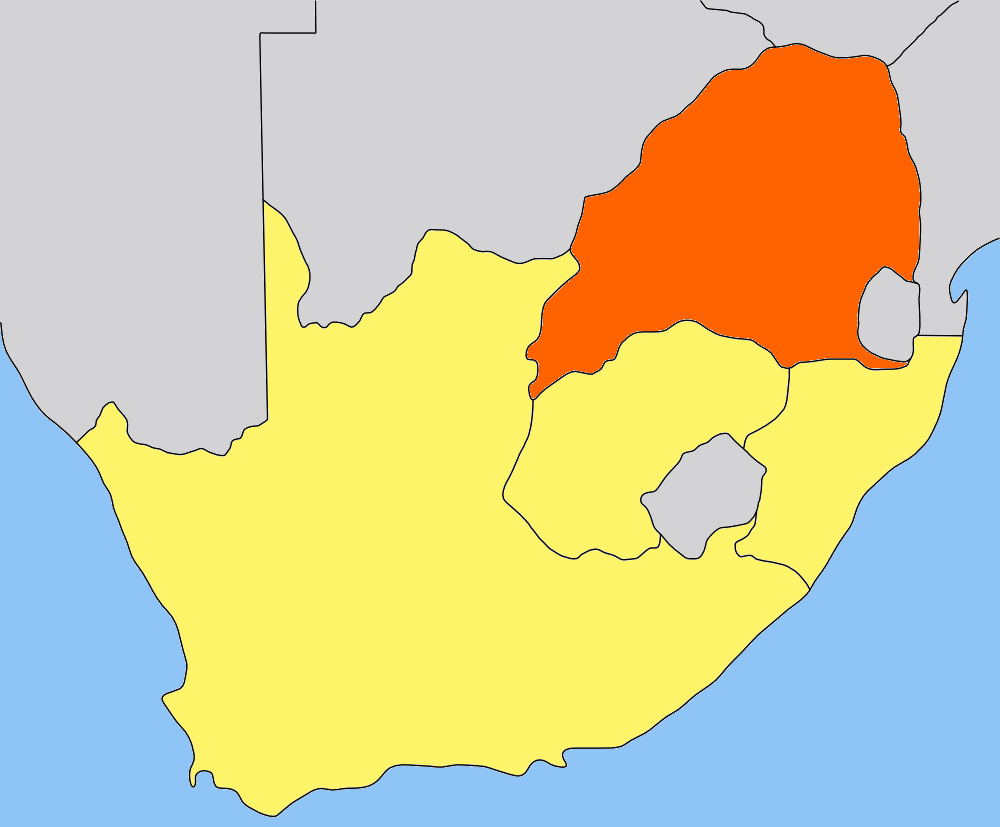
Map of the Transvaal Colony (orange) within South Africa (yellow).

=== Governors of the Transvaal ===
Flag of the governor of the Transvaal Colony (1904–1910).

Tenure	Portrait	Incumbent	Notes
First annexation
Administrators
12 April 1877 to 4 March 1879		Sir Theophilus Shepstone	
4 March 1879 to 8 August 1881		Owen Lanyon	From 6 April 1880, Sir William Owen Lanyon; acting for Wolseley 29 September 1879 – 27 April 1880
Governor
29 September 1879 to 27 April 1880		Garnet Wolseley, 1st Viscount Wolseley	
Second annexation
Administrator
4 January 1901 to 23 June 1902		Alfred Milner, 1st Viscount Milner	Simultaneously served as the Administrator of Orange River Colony
Governors
21 June 1902 to 1 April 1905		Alfred Milner, 1st Viscount Milner	Simultaneously served as the governor of Orange River Colony
2 April 1905 to 31 May 1910		William Palmer, 2nd Earl of Selborne	

=== Lieutenant-governors of the Transvaal ===
Tenure	Portrait	Incumbent	Notes
Second annexation
Lieutenant-Governors
29 September 1902 to 4 December 1905		Sir Arthur Lawley	Appointed Governor of Madras
23 March 1906 to January 1907		Sir Richard Solomon	Acting for Selborne 4 December 1905 to 2 October 1906

=== Prime Minister of the Transvaal ===
Tenure	Portrait	Incumbent	Party	Notes
4 March 1907 to 31 May 1910		Louis Botha	HV	Afterwards served as the first prime minister of South Africa, from 1910 to 1919

== See also ==
- High Commissioner for Southern Africa
- Commander-in-Chief of British Forces in South Africa
- List of administrators of former South African provinces
