= 1897 in South Africa =

- Decades: 1870s; 1880s; 1890s; 1900s; 1910s
- See also: List of years in South Africa

The following lists events that happened during 1897 in South Africa.

== Incumbents ==
- Governor of the Cape of Good Hope and High Commissioner for Southern Africa:Hercules Robinson then Alfred Milner.
- Governor of the Colony of Natal: Charles Bullen Hugh Mitchell.
- State President of the Orange Free State: Martinus Theunis Steyn.
- State President of the South African Republic: Paul Kruger.
- Prime Minister of the Cape of Good Hope: John Gordon Sprigg.
- Prime Minister of the Colony of Natal:
  - until 14 February: John Robinson.
  - 15 February – 4 October: Harry Escombe.
  - starting 4 October: Henry Binns.

== Events ==
April

- 21 – Sir Alfred Milner becomes High Commissioner of South Africa and Governor of the Cape Colony.

May

- 5 – Port Elizabeth is flooded.

December

- 30 – The Colony of Natal annexes Zululand.

Unknown date

- Bergville is established in the foothills of the Drakensberg mountains in Natal.
- "Nkosi Sikelel' iAfrika" ("God Bless Africa") is composed as a Xhosa hymn by South African teacher Enoch Sontonga.

== Births ==
- 3 July – Ludwig Wybren Hiemstra, Afrikaans linguist and editor of the Bilingual Dictionary, is born in Lydenburg.
- 26 October – James Leonard Brierley Smith, ichthyologist, is born in Graaff Reinet.

== Railways ==
=== Railway lines opened ===
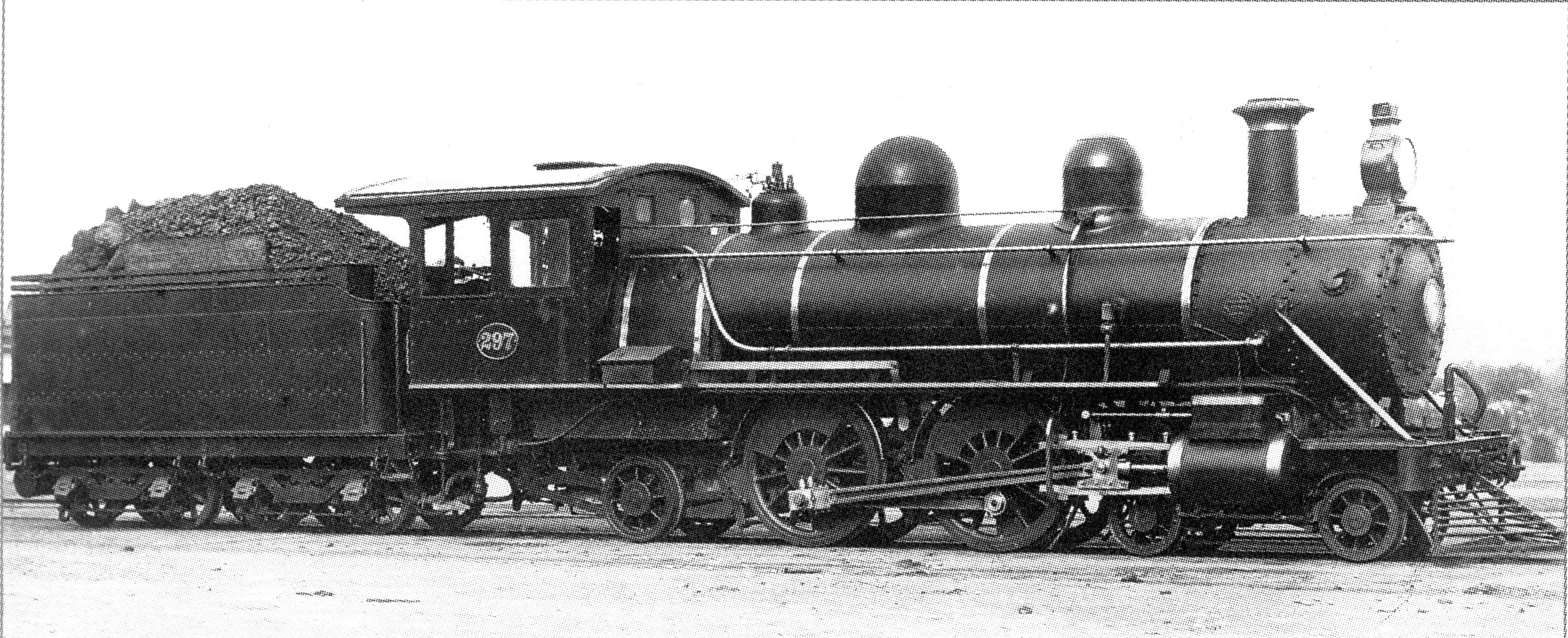
CGR 4th Class

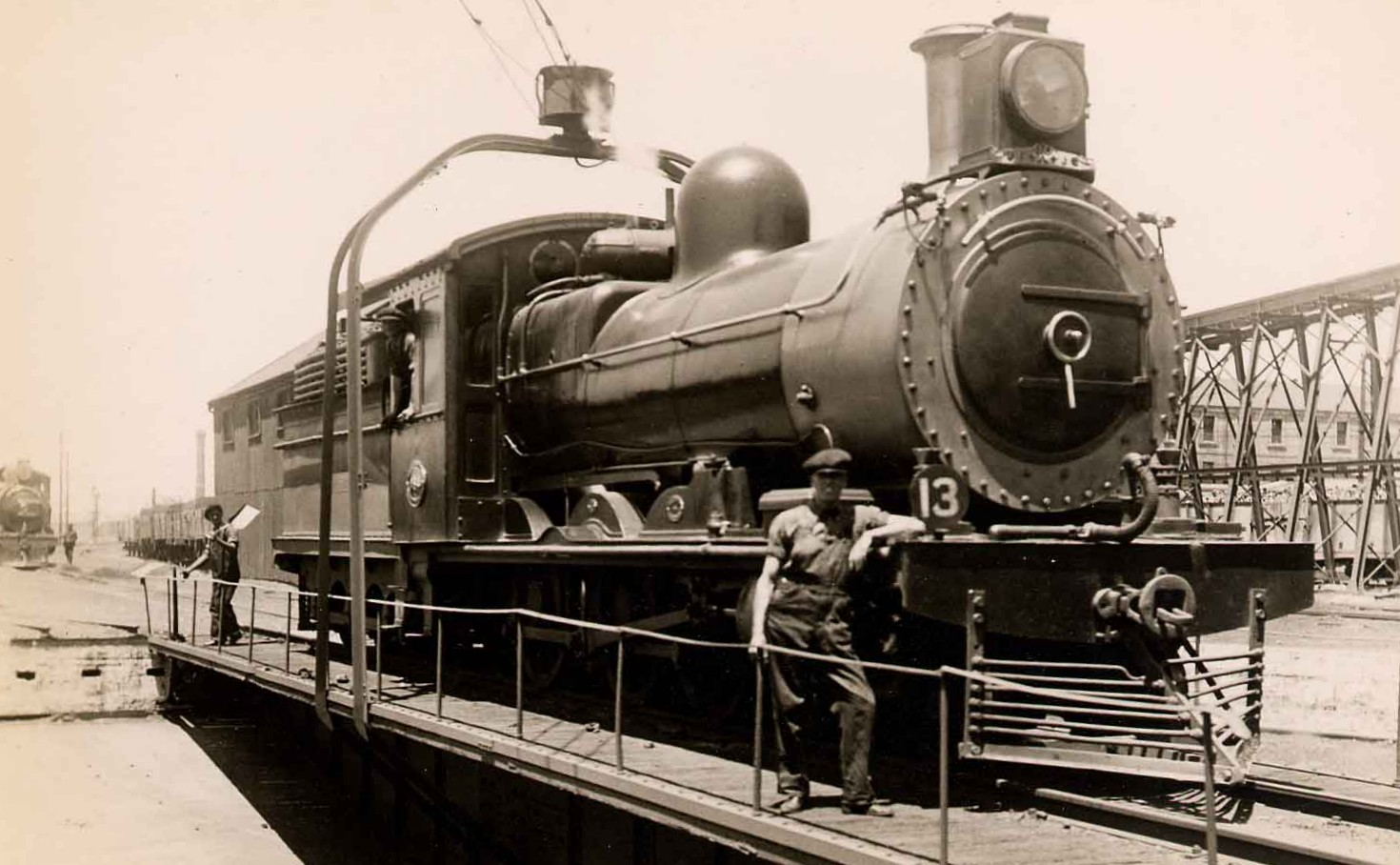
SAR Class 6B

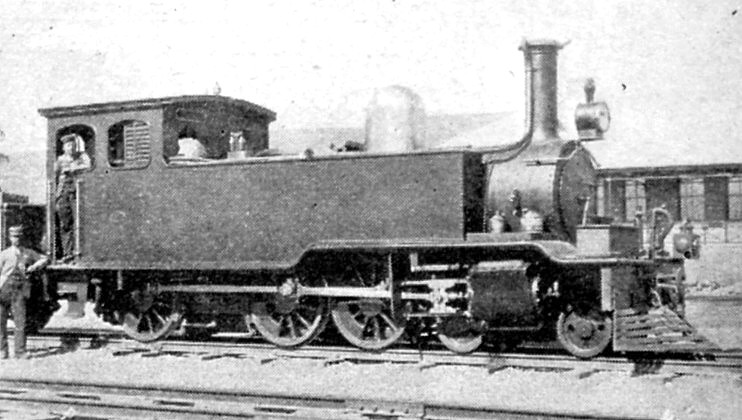
PPR 35 Tonner Portuguese

- 13 March – Cape Western – Mafeking to Ramatlabama at the Bechuanaland border, 16 miles (25.7 kilometres).
- 3 August – Transvaal – Frederikstad to Klerksdorp, 43 miles (69.2 kilometres).
- 1 October – Cape Midland – Rosmead Junction to Middelburg, 7 miles 3 chains (11.3 kilometres).
- 1 December – Natal – Isipingo to Park Rynie, 27 miles 48 chains (44.4 kilometres).
- 3 December – Natal – Verulam to Tongaat, 12 miles (19.3 kilometres).
- 15 December – Natal – Thornville Junction to Richmond, 17 miles 17 chains (27.7 kilometres).

=== Locomotives ===
Cape

Two new Cape gauge locomotive types enter service on the Cape Government Railways (CGR):

- Six 4th Class 4-4-2 Atlantic type tender locomotives on the section from Kimberley southwards.
- A third batch of fifty-five 6th Class 4-6-0 steam locomotives. In 1912 they would become Class 6B on the South African Railways.

Transvaal

- The independent Pretoria-Pietersburg Railway in the Zuid-Afrikaansche Republiek (Transvaal Republic) purchases a 4-6-0 35 Tonner tank locomotive named Portuguese from the Lourenco Marques, Delagoa Bay and East Africa Railway in Mozambique.
- Arthur Koppel, acting as agent, imports a number of Dickson-built 0-4-2ST narrow gauge saddle tank steam locomotives to mines on the Witwatersrand.
