= Edmund Neville Nevill =

English scientist (1849–1940)

Edmund Neison FRS FRAS (27 August 1849 – 14 January 1940), whose real name was Edmund Neville Nevill, wrote a key text in selenography called The Moon and the Condition and Configuration of its Surface in 1876 and later set up the Natal Observatory in Durban, Natal Province. He also wrote a popular book on astronomy some years after immigrating to Durban.

== Early years and volunteer soldier ==
He was born at Beverley, Yorkshire, England on 27 August 1849 and educated at Harrow School and New College, Oxford. During the Franco-Prussian War he volunteered with French forces and served with Marshal MacMahon.

== London 1871 to 1882 ==
In 1871, Nevill returned to London and worked as parliamentary reporter to The Standard and also as theatre critic, but his interests included astronomy and chemistry. Nevill has the means to set up a private observatory in Hampstead and became known as amateur with a special interest in the Moon. Nevill was elected a fellow of the Royal Astronomical Society (RAS) under the name Edmund Neison, 'having the curious idea that it was derogatory to the holder of an ancient name to make a career in science'. He reverted to Nevill in 1888 'in accordance with the conditions of a will'. RAS paper in June 1873 argued for the existence of a lunar atmosphere and later paper defined (low) limits for the density of such an atmosphere.

In 1876 he produced The Moon and the Condition and Configuration of its Surface described as a translation, extension and updating of Madler. Used many observations and sketches by Webb and other amateurs. The volume 'served its purpose of stimulating interest in selenography'. Nevill was a founder of the Selenographical Society with William Radcliffe Birt, and from 1878 published in Selenographical Journal. This book is still prized by amateur selenographers and is quoted extensively by Wilkins and Moore.

Nevill also became a Member of the Chemical Society having agitated in early 1870s for a Chemical Institute. At meeting of Chemical Society on 26 April 1876 committee formed and Neison was one of the Fellows of the Institute of Chemistry, serving on the council from 1877 to 1900. Later he acted as a Government Chemist in Natal.

== Lunar theory ==
The context of Nevill's lunar work was given by the increasing recognition of the inaccuracy of Hansen's Tables. Simon Newcomb found fluctuations both irregular and long period, and researched early observations of Moon. In 1878 Newcomb reviewed all observations and found that Hansen's fit back to 1750 worked because all earlier results were ignored. Finding if terms had been omitted from Hansen's theory was a major research issue at the time. Neison/Nevill, in a paper published in the RAS March 1877, confirmed a Jupiter term discovered by Simon Newcomb in 1876 – Neison's coefficient is accurate but an associated long period term coefficient is off by factor of 10. In 1877 Nevill produces a memoir developing analytical theory with an eye to less labour involved in producing tables. Memoir 'showed Nevill to possess considerable powers of Mathematical manipulation'. Later: Ernest W. Brown derived a new theory from first principles – much of Neison's later work in Durban observing Moon positions and comparing with theory is left high and dry and not published due to financial constraints.

== Durban 1882–1912 ==
A transit of Venus occurred on 8 December 1874 and 6 December 1882. The Transit of Venus Commission set up stations to observe the event. Durban was considered as a possible station but rejected because of tendency to cloudy weather in Natal during December season. Establishing an observatory in Durban was of interest to Harry Escombe, the Durban representative on the Legislative Council of the Colony of Natal. David Gill, Astronomer Royal to the Cape, agreed and £350 voted by the Corporation of Durban plus £500 by the Legislative Council to found an observatory. A Grubb 8-inch aperture equatorial refracting telescope presented by Escombe and a 3-inch transit instrument was purchased by the government. A Dent sidereal clock was lent by the Venus Commission. Gill telegrammed Nevill to offer the post of Government Astronomer, and Nevill sailed at 24 hours' notice on 27 October and arrived 27 November 1882.

State of the observatory

Nevill took possession of the observatory 1 December 1882 and found a thick coat of paint covered dome machinery making it immovable, the telescope had been erected prior to dome and had suffered from salt air and moved with difficulty, the polarising solar eyepiece was incompatible with telescope or accessories. The transit instrument was in Cape Town so a telegraph was used to relay time signal from Cape Observatory. Still, observations of the transit (in fine weather conditions) were obtained five days later.

Later observatory work

Observations were made to check Moon theory: determination of parallactic inequality, study of effect of limb irregularities on apparent place of Moon, effect of irradiation on apparent diameter; and determination of real libration of Moon. Also weather observations, time service, comets and 'temporary phenomena'. Staff included Nevill, assistant, and later 'four ladies were added as astronomical computers'. Nevill published a major paper on corrections to Hansen's Tables – using 1500 observations of the Moon to derive corrections for arbitrary values assumed by Hansen for coefficients. Nevill proposed two ambitious projects: mathematical investigation of terms of long period resulting from planetary action and the actual calculation of every term of long period exceeding a maximum amplitude of 0.1 arc sec. Lack of library access to Hansen, Poisson and Delaunay hampered progress.

Tidal work

In 1885 for Natal Harbour Board was using methods devised by British Association Committee. Tide tables for Natal were produced in 1888. Paul Huges (UK) has researched the letters from Nevill to Darwin on tide observations as part of a larger body of work on the history of tidal theory in the nineteenth century. Nevill's letters to Gill and Darwin are in archives in UK including the Cambridge University archives.

Money problems

In 1887 no funds were available for salaries. 'The greater part of the work of the Observatory would have had to be suspended, had it not been for the zealous assistance of four ladies'. Political changes in the Legislative Assembly occurred throughout this period, and in 1888 an assistant was appointed again, and a manuscript catalogue of the Right Ascensions of zodiacal stars was made. Nevill was elected a Fellow of the Royal Society in 1888 and Nevill was appointed Government Chemist and Official Assayer for Natal, which included the duty for latter post of acting as pathologist in cases of suspected poisoning.

Later lunar theory work

Observations of the Moon at Greenwich compared with Hansen's Tables, with Nevill's corrections leading to new values of elements and new lunar tables prepared. No publication of this work occurred due to lack of funds at Durban. Work was restricted more and more to routine observations and in 1911 the observatory closed. Nevill returned to Britain and retired in Eastbourne. Most lunar work was superseded by E. W. Brown in a series of five memoirs between 1897 and 1905.

Family

In 1894 (at age 45) Nevill married Mabel Grant (born 1865) one of the 'four ladies' at the observatory.

== Retirement 1912–1940 ==
He was a keen lawn tennis player and much interested in Babylonian history 'which occupied him after his retirement'. Nevill never attended meetings of the Royal Society, to which he had been admitted in 1908, and was known personally to very few of the Fellows. Nevill was averse to photography and no known photograph exists. The lunar crater Neison is named after him.

In 1940 he died and his three children and Mrs Nevill survived him.
