= Natal Observatory =

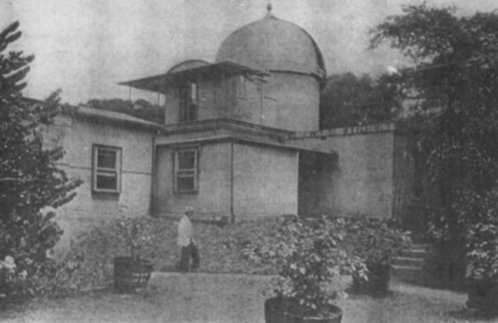
- Location: Durban, South Africa
- Coordinates: 29°50′47″S 31°0′17.7″E
- Altitude: 260 feet (79 m)
- Established: 1882
- Closed: 1911

The Natal Observatory was an astronomical observatory in the Colony of Natal (now the KwaZulu-Natal province of the Republic of South Africa) from 1882 to 1911. The most important work carried out there was a study of the motion of the moon.

== Founding of the observatory ==
External image
- External view of the Observatory prior to 1895

In 1882 David Gill, director of the Royal Observatory, Cape of Good Hope, requested the government of Natal to establish an astronomical observatory at Durban, in anticipation of the transit of Venus on 4 December that year. Mr Robert T. Pett, third assistant at the Royal Observatory, visited Durban in June that year to expedite matters. A site for the observatory was chosen in the southwest corner of the Natal Botanic Gardens. Gill invited the British astronomer Edmund Neville Nevill (also known as Edmund Neison) to take up the post of government astronomer of Natal and director of the observatory, urging him to arrive in time to observe the transit. Nevill landed in Durban on 27 November and despite problems with the available equipment managed to observe the transit successfully.

== Equipment ==
The Natal Observatory was initially equipped with a 200 mm Grubb equatorial refracting telescope donated by the Natal lawyer and politician Harry Escombe, a 75 mm Troughton & Simms transit instrument, a clock by Dent keeping sidereal time, and some precision clocks and other minor instruments. A mean time clock by Victor Kullberg was added in 1892 and a 75 mm portable equatorial refractor in 1896. In December 1883 meteorological instruments were received from England and regular meteorological observations initiated at the observatory. Instruments to measure magnetic declination arrived in 1892.

== Staff ==
Nevill remained director of the observatory until it was closed in 1911, following the incorporation of Natal into the Union (now the Republic) of South Africa in 1910. He was assisted by, among others, the following persons:

- John Grant, human computer from November 1883 to 1885, then astronomical assistant to the end of 1886 when funds for his post ran out. Re-appointed as astronomical assistant from February 1888 to 1890.
- Mabel Grant (South Africa's first women's single tennis champion from 1891 to 1894), human computer from 1887 or earlier to 1890, meteorological assistant to August 1891, and (senior) astronomical assistant from 1 September 1891 to April 1903. She married Nevill in 1894.
- Miss B. Grant, human computer from 1887 or earlier to 1891, then meteorological assistant to September 1894. A number of other ladies did computational work at the observatory, including several further members of the Grant family.
- Frederick A. (Fred) Hammond (born 1853), meteorological assistant from 1 October 1894 to 1909.
- Hugh C. Mason (1873–1936), junior astronomical assistant from 1 December 1897 to June 1900.
- Robert F. Rendell (born 1873), FRAS, formerly of the Royal Greenwich Observatory, senior astronomical assistant from April 1903 to March 1907.
- Arthur E. Hodgson (born 1880), FRAS, formerly of the Solar Physics Observatory at South Kensington, junior astronomical assistant from May 1903 to the end of 1909, and senior astronomical assistant from 1 January 1910 until the observatory closed.

== Research on the motion of the moon ==
During the 1880s the discrepancies between the best available lunar tables (published by Hansen in 1857) and observations had become so large that navigators could no longer use the moon's position to determine their longitude accurately. Nevill tackled the problem by first verifying Hansen's treatment of lunar perturbations caused by the direct action of the sun. He then devised an improved method for calculating perturbations caused by Venus. The remaining errors he ascribed to the gravitational pull of the other planets, whose effects were very difficult to calculate. This work was published, among others, in a paper in the Memoirs of the Royal Astronomical Society (1885), describing the corrections required by Hansen's tables. He next studied all available lunar observations since the middle of the 17th century and reduced them to a uniform basis. Comparing these observations to Hansen's tables, he used the discrepancies to derive the amplitudes and periods of appropriate correction terms. After all these improvements the tables provided an excellent fit to all lunar observations made since 1650.

The work was ready for publication by the end of 1894, but no funds were available to have it printed. Each year Nevill urged the Natal government in his annual Report of the Government Astronomer to provide funds for publication, but to no avail. In his report for 1898 he wrote despairingly: The investigations of the errors in the lunar tables have been wrapped up in brown paper, tied up with red tape, and put away on a shelf until such time as a vote can be obtained to publish it… The next year disaster struck when the manuscript was damaged during a rainstorm owing to a leak in the observatory's roof. In subsequent years similar work was done by others, notably E.W. Brown in the United States, M. Radau in France, and P.H. Cowell in Britain, who received the credit. In 1907 Nevill related this sad history in his presidential address to Section A of the South African Association for the Advancement of Science.

== Other scientific work ==
Nevill's other astronomical work included the accurate determination of the observatory's latitude and longitude, first for astronomical purposes and then for the geodetic survey of southern Africa, and regular transit observations for the provision of time signals. A larger collaborative project, carried out from 1886 to 1896, involved the comparison of the declination of stars based on observations made in the northern and southern hemispheres. During his early years in Natal, under the name E.N. Neison, he published a popular book entitled Astronomy: a simple introduction to a noble science (London, 1886). He also made a study of ancient eclipses, on which he read a paper at the joint meeting of the British and South African Associations for the Advancement of Science in 1905.

In addition to the regular meteorological observations made at the observatory the staff was responsible also for analysing and publishing meteorological observations made elsewhere in Natal. Thus by 1900 there were 31 stations that submitted their observations to the observatory on a monthly basis. In 1908 Nevill wrote an article on the rainfall in Natal for the Natal Agricultural Journal, in which he identified an 18-year rainfall cycle. Rendell also published a paper on the rainfall at Durban in the Quarterly Journal of the Royal Meteorological Society in 1906.

The staff also analysed tidal observations made during 1884–1888 and compiled tidal tables for Durban Harbour. By 1903, these had still not been printed and by that time the entrance to the harbour had changed so much that more recent tidal observations needed to be analysed, for which there were no funds. From 1893 daily observations of the magnetic declination were made at the observatory. In November 1887 Nevill was appointed also as Government Chemist and Official Assayer for Natal, which further reduced the time available for astronomical research. His chemical work was mainly of a routine nature and included analyses of geological samples for gold and other metals, analyses of soil samples for agricultural purposes, the examination of high explosives and detonators, and toxicological investigations.

== Closure of the observatory ==
Following the formation of the Union of South Africa in 1910 the post of government astronomer of Natal was abolished and the observatory closed down. Some of the equipment went to the Union Observatory in Johannesburg. During the nineteen-twenties the Natal Astronomical Association repaired the observatory and opened it to the public for some time. Later the 200 mm refractor came under the control of the Natal Technical College

== See also ==
- List of astronomical observatories

== Notes and references ==
- Ingram, Joseph Forsyth (1895). The colony of Natal; an official illustrated handbook and railway guide. London: J. Causton and sons.
- History of meteorology in South Africa. Weather Bureau Newsletter (Pretoria), Centenary edition, 1960, No. 139, pp. 1–48.
- Moore, Patrick; Collins, Pete (1977). The astronomy of Southern Africa. Cape Town: Howard Timmins. ISBN 978-0-7091-6176-9.
- Natal civil service list, 1895, 1899, 1906. Pietermaritzburg: P. Davis & Sons.
- National Automated Archival Information Retrieval System (NAAIRS). http://www.national.archives.gov.za/naairs.htm Documents relating to E.N. Neison.
- National Union catalogue, pre-1956 imprints. London: Mansell, 1968–1980.
- Neison, E. Report of the superintendent, Natal Observatory. In Colony of Natal, Departmental reports, 1883–4, 1885, 1886.
- Nevill, E. Report of the superintendent, Natal Observatory. In Colony of Natal, Departmental reports, 1887, 1888, 1889, 1890–1, 1891–2, 1892–3, 1893–4, 1894–5, July–December 1895.
- Nevill, E. Report of the government astronomer. In Colony of Natal, Departmental reports, 1896, 1897, 1898, 1899, 1900, 1901, 1902, 1903, 1904, 1905, 1906, 1907, 1909.
- Nevill, E. Presidential address (Section A). Report of the South African Association for the Advancement of Science, 1907, pp. 19–23
- Rendell, R.F. Meteorological notes from Natal Observatory. Addresses and papers read at the joint meeting of the British and South African Associations for the Advancement of Science held in South Africa, 1905, Vol. 1, pp. 52–65. Johannesburg: SAAAS, 1906.
- Royal Society of London. Catalogue of scientific papers [1800–1900]. London: Royal Society, 1867–1925.
- South African bibliography to the year 1925. London: Mansell, 1979.
