= Don Albert & Partners =

South African architectural firm

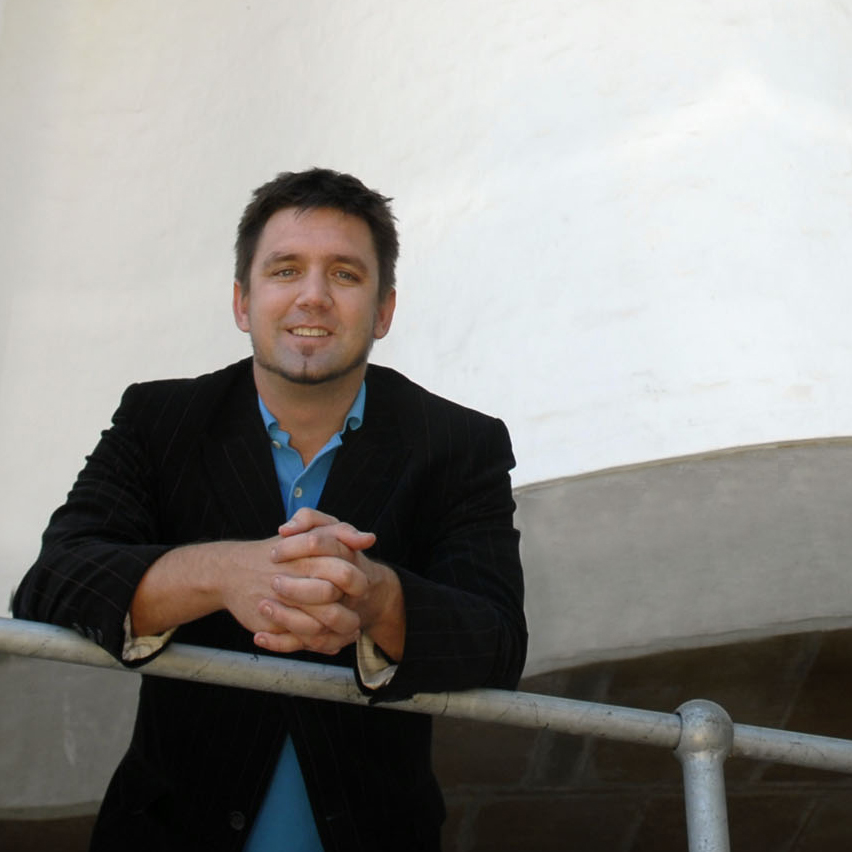

Practice information
- Key architects: Don Albert
- Founded: 1997
- Location: Cape Town

Significant works and honors
- Buildings: Millennium Tower, Durban; Proud Heritage Clothing Campus

Don Albert & Partners is an architectural firm founded by Don Albert.

== Background ==
Don Albert (born 22 February 1971 in Port Shepstone, South Africa) is a South African–born architect. He was schooled at Treverton College and received a Bachelor of Architecture (1993) and a Post Graduate Diploma in Architecture (1994) at the University of KwaZulu-Natal, South Africa. In 1996 Don was awarded a Fulbright Scholarship to complete his masters at the University of California, Los Angeles. After graduation he spent another year as design associate at the office of AIA Gold Medallist (Los Angeles) Barton Myers, Beverly Hills.

Prior to attending UCLA, Albert founded his own architectural design firm, soundspacedesign (since rebranded as Don Albert & Partners) to practice in South Africa. In 1997 he was awarded first prize and the commission to design the Barrows building in Durban. This competition entry was submitted and realised from Los Angeles via the internet, an innovation at the time, and heralded a new mode of “integrated” non-hierarchical work space for post-apartheid industry.

In February 2000, Don Albert and Alex Pienaar won the National Ports Authority's Millennium Tower architectural competition for the port control tower in the city of Durban. The Millennium Tower won a SAICE Award for Best Civil Engineering Project in 2004.

Don Albert was the second youngest architect to be featured in Phaidon World Atlas of Contemporary architecture.

== Recent work ==
Having designed, built and co-managed the Voyager Boutique Creative Retreat in Bali for 6 years, Don then moved to Sydney Australia, and in 2018 opened SOUND SPACE DESIGN (PTY) LTD in order to service the urban design and master planning of the Peralta Beach Development by Obrana in Lisbon amongst other master planning projects.

In 2022, Don Albert & Partners won an international design competition for Cape Town's Zip Zap new social circus facility at the Artscape Precinct in Cape Town, achieving planning permission in April 2023.

In June 2023 Don Albert opened his Under Water World art exhibition exploring a post-human, post-apocalyptic oceanic world through the use of Artificial Intelligence.

== Gallery ==
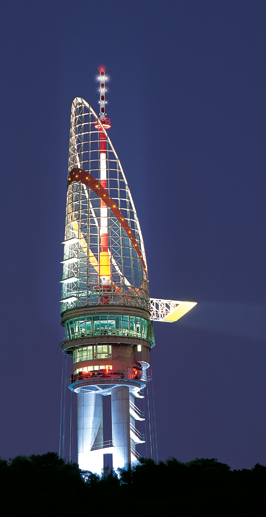
Millennium Tower

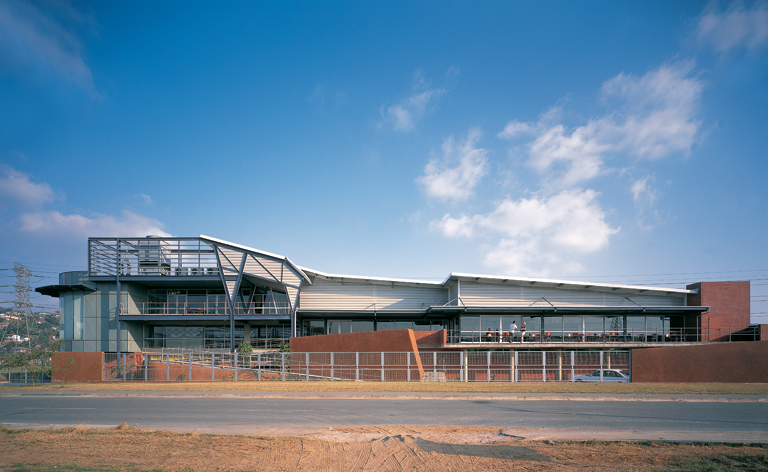
Barrows

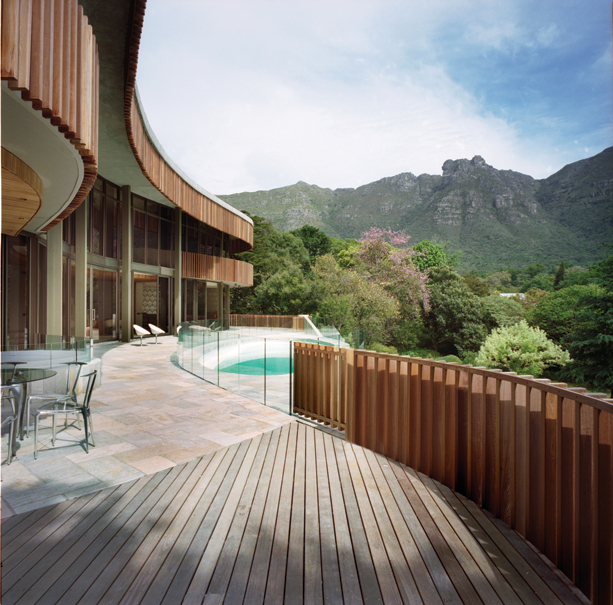
Organic House

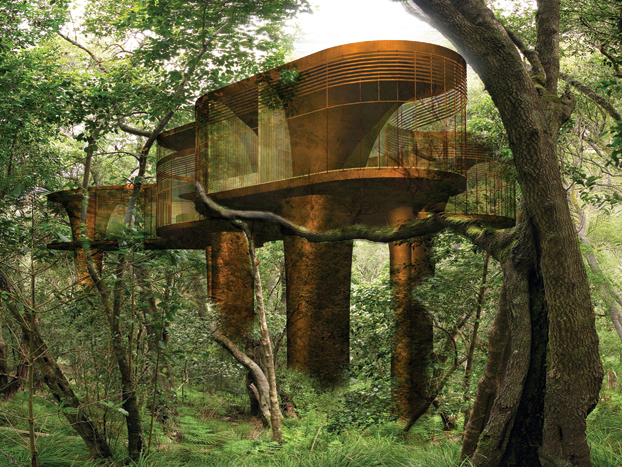
Trumpet House

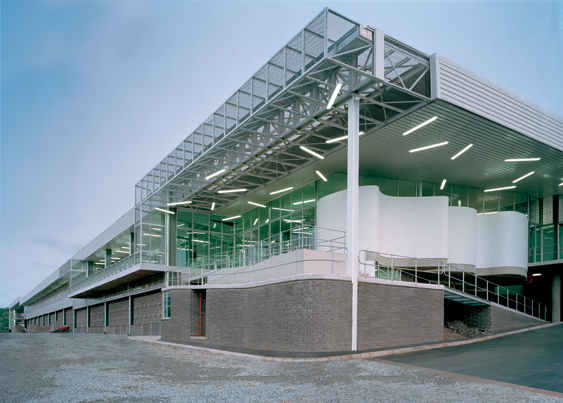
Proud Heritage Clothing Campus

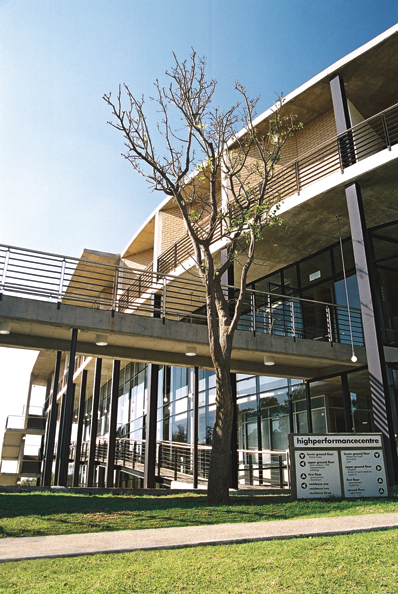
High Performance Centre, University of Pretoria

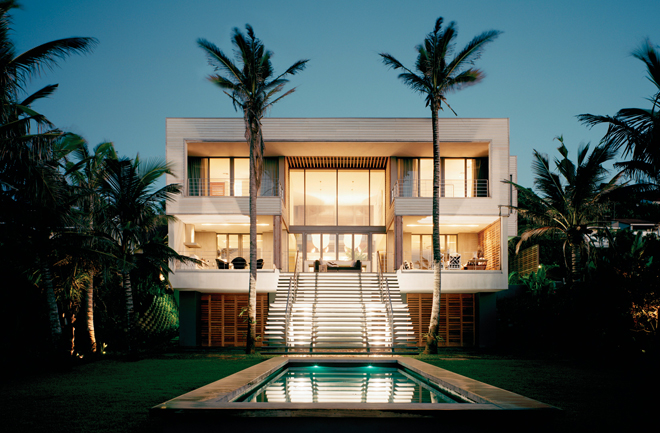
The Grey House

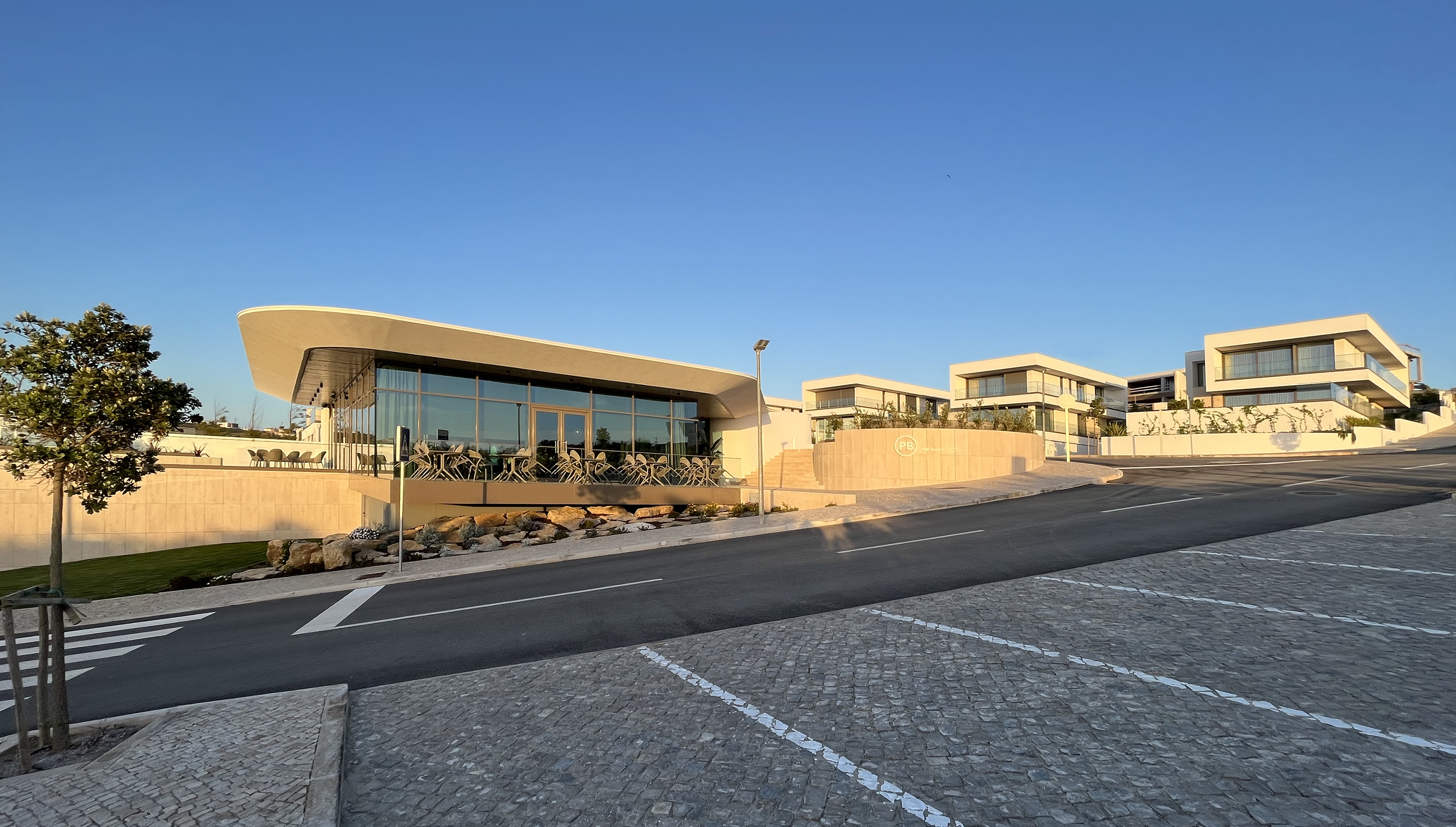
Peralta Beach Masterplan

== Projects ==
- UNDER WATER WORLD - 2023 (AI Art Exhibition)
- ZIP ZAP Performance Hall at Artscape, Cape Town – 2022 (Winning Competition Entry)
- PERALTA BEACH Masterplan - 2022 (Ongoing Project)
- DESIGN INDABA 10x10 HOUSING With Tom Dixon – 2008
- PROUD HERITAGE CLOTHING CAMPUS – 2006 (SAIA Merit Award Winner)
- PROUD HERITAGE WAREHOUSE 2 – 2006 (SAIA Merit Award Winner)
- KINGS PARK ICONIC STADIUM – 2006 (Invited Competition Entry & Finalist)
- MILLENNIUM TOWER – 2002 (Winning Competition Entry)
- HIGH PERFORMANCE CENTRE – University of Pretoria 2001
- BARROWS POINT OF PURCHASE – 1998 (Winning Competition Entry)

== Selected honours and awards ==
- SAICE 2004 Award for Best Civil Engineering Project, Durban – Millennium Tower, Durban
- SAISC 2006 Award for the Best Steel Construction in the Architectural Category for the Proud Heritage Clothing Campus, Durban
- SAIA 2007 Merit Award for Proud Heritage Clothing Campus, Durban
- KZNIA 2007 Award for Proud Heritage Clothing Campus, Durban
