= Charles Hime =

South African cricketer (1869–1940)

- Hime, c. 1914

Personal information
- Full name: Charles Frederick William Hime
- Born: 24 October 1869; Bermuda
- Died: 6 December 1940 (aged 71); Pietermaritzburg, Natal, Union of South Africa
- Batting: Right-handed
- Bowling: Right-arm medium-pace
- Relatives: Albert Henry Hime (father)

International information
- National side: South Africa

Domestic team information
- Years: Team
- 1889–90 to 1905–06: Natal

Career statistics
Competition	Tests	First-class
Matches	1	15
Runs scored	8	358
Batting average	4.00	12.34
100s/50s	0/0	0/1
Top score	8	58
Balls bowled	55	1267
Wickets	1	24
Bowling average	31.00	22.41
5 wickets in innings	0	1
10 wickets in match	0	0
Best bowling	1/20	5/18
Catches/stumpings	0/–	10/–
- Source: Cricinfo, 28 May 2020

Charles Frederick William Hime (24 October 1869 – 6 December 1940) was a South African cricketer who played in one Test match in 1896. He later became a magistrate in Natal.

== Biography ==
Hime was the son of Albert Henry Hime of the Royal Engineers, who was building an important causeway in Bermuda at the time of Charles's birth. After the completion of the causeway, Albert Hime and his family moved to the Colony of Natal, where he served as Premier of Natal from 1899 to 1903.

Charles Hime was educated in Natal at Pietermaritzburg College and Hilton College, where he captained the rugby union and cricket teams. After leaving school he became private secretary to the Chief Justice of Natal in 1888. He later worked his way up from third-class clerk in the Attorney-General's Office to first-class clerk in 1899. In 1904 he became secretary to the Minister of Justice. In 1908 he was appointed an assistant magistrate, serving in various parts of Natal. In 1921 he was appointed a magistrate, and was chief magistrate of Pietermaritzburg when he retired in 1929.

Hime played most of his club cricket for Pietermaritzburg Cricket Club. He scored 58 (his highest first-class score and the highest score in the match) and 29 when Natal defeated Transvaal by seven runs in the Currie Cup in 1893–94. He did reasonably well with bat and ball in the matches Pietermaritzburg and Natal played against the touring Lord Hawke's XI in January 1896, but was less successful when selected in the South African team for the First Test shortly afterwards – although his eight runs made him the second-highest scorer in South Africa's second innings of 30. He captained Natal in his final first-class match in 1905–06 against the touring MCC and took his best figures of 5 for 18.

After he retired from playing sport, Hime spent ten years as president of the Natal Amateur Athletics and Cycling Association. He was a life member of the Pietermaritzburg Child Welfare Society.

Hime married Kathleen Shores in England in 1898. They had four children. Hime's brothers Arthur and Maurice, both born in Bermuda, also played first-class cricket in South Africa. Hime died in Pietermaritzburg in December 1940, aged 71. His wife died in 1979.

== See also ==
- List of Test cricketers born in non-Test playing nations
