= Frederick Moor =

South African politician

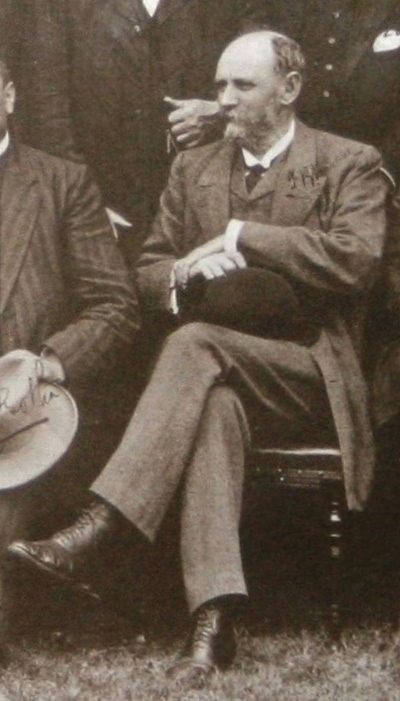
Moor at the National Convention in Durban, 1908

Sir Frederick Robert Moor, KCMG, PC (12 May 1853 – 18 March 1927) was a South African politician who served as the last Prime Minister of the Colony of Natal between 1906 and 1910.

== Biography ==
Moor was born in Pietermaritzburg, the son of Frederick William Moor 1830-1886 and Sarah Annabella Ralfe 1831 - 1915 and grandson of Col. John William Moor 1787-1833 and Mary Ann Price 1793 - 1878. His grandmother, Mary Ann, died at the home of her youngest son (Frederick's father), Brakfontein, July 8, 1878. He was aByrne Settler. He was educated at the Hermannsburg School. Aged nineteen, Moor went to the newly discovered diamond fields at Kimberley, where he met his wife and remained for seven years. In 1879, he sold his claims and returned to Natal to farm. In 1886, he was elected to the Natal Legislative Council for Weenen County, and agitated for responsible government. He served as Minister of Native Affairs between 1893–97 and 1899–1903. As minister, he strongly favoured upholding customary law and the power of native chiefs.

In November 1906, he succeeded Charles John Smythe as prime minister. He strongly supported the unification of South Africa. When the Union of South Africa was established in 1910, the position of prime minister of Natal ceased to exist, and Moor became Minister of Commerce and Industries in Louis Botha's cabinet, but was quickly defeated in the 1910 election. He was then nominated to the Senate, and served until 1920. That year he retired to his farm near Estcourt.

Moor was sworn of the Privy Council in 1907 when he attended that year's Imperial Conference, and appointed KCMG in 1911.
