= George Morris Sutton =

Sir George Morris Sutton

5th Prime Minister of Natal
- In office 18 August 1903 – 16 May 1905
- Monarch: Edward VII
- Preceded by: Albert Henry Hime
- Succeeded by: Charles John Smythe

Personal details
- Born: 8 July 1834 Crowland, Lincolnshire, England
- Died: 30 November 1913 (aged 79) Howick, Natal, South Africa
- Spouse: Harriett Burkitt 1834-1879, Mary Pascoe 1881 -
- Children: Morris Adlard Sutton, William Henry Sutton
- Occupation: Farmer, politician, writer

Sir George Morris Sutton KCMG (8 July 1834 – 30 November 1913) was a South African politician and farmer. Born in Britain, he served as the Prime Minister of the British Colony of Natal from 18 August 1903 to 16 May 1905.

== Biography ==
Sutton was born on 8 July 1834 in Crowland, Lincolnshire to Joseph Sutton and Elizabeth Price (née Cherrington).

In 1854 he emigrated to the United States, where in 1859 he married Harriett Burkitt, mother of his two sons. After living for some years in Chicago, Illinois, Sutton emigrated to the British Crown Colony of Natal in South Africa, arriving in Durban, Natal on 10 May 1872.

He was married a second time to Mary Pascoe in 1881, and bought several farms including Stocklands, Oaklands, Fairfell, and Everdon in the Karkloof Forest outside the village of Howick. Sutton lived and farmed for many years, contributing considerably to the agricultural knowledge of the Colony by writing in The Natal Witness under the penname "Agricola". He exported wattle tree bark to England for use in tanning leather, developing the wattle industry in Natal.

Sutton was a member of the Pietermaritzburg Agricultural Society, serving as president in two periods (1880-1883 and 1905–1907).

The Fairfell homestead is now a South African National Landmark.

== Natal wattle pioneer ==
A Natal wattle farming pioneer, Sutton played a founding role in developing the colony's fledgling wattle industry, exporting wattle tree bark to England for use in tanning leather. In 1877, he joined the Pietermaritzburg Agricultural Society, serving as its president for two terms, from 1880 to 1883 and again from 1905 to 1907. In 1884 he persuaded a tannery in Pietermaritzburg to experiment with the bark of the local black wattle, introduced from Australia some 20 years earlier, as a tanning material. The experiments proved successful and encouraged the local production of wattle bark for export. In 1888, Sutton published a 22-page pamphlet, Wattle Bark: A Paying Industry in Natal, in which he explained how to grow the trees, when to cut them down, how to strip and prepare the bark, the varieties of trees to plant, the yield of bark per acre, and the returns that farmers could expect, based partly on information from Australia. A second, enlarged 46-page edition was published in 1892. Later he became a director of several wattle concerns in Natal and a driving force in the development of the Dundee coal industry. He was furthermore the agricultural correspondent for The Natal Witness for nine years, writing under the pen-name "Agricola".

== Political career ==
He was member of the Natal Legislative Council (1875-1883 and 1885–1893). He was nominated to the Executive Council in 1882. In 1892, he was part of a delegation of Natal politicians who accompanied Sir John Robinson to England to seek Responsible Government for the Colony.

He was nominated to the Legislative Council for Pietermaritzburg upon the establishment of Responsible Government in 1893. Also, he was Colonial Treasurer of Natal from 1893 to 1897.

In August 1903 he became Prime Minister of Natal for two years.

== Honorific title ==
He was invested as Knight Commander of Order of St. Michael and St. George (K.C.M.G.) on 24 June 1904.

== Legacy ==
His great-grandson, William Morris Sutton, was elected in 1959 as a Member of the Natal Provincial Council, and in 1964 to the South African Senate. In 1966, he became a Member of Parliament for the Natal constituency of Mooi River. In 1989, he was appointed to the State President's Council on Economic and Constitutional Development.
