= Mabel Nevill =

South African human computer and astronomer

Mabel Nevill (née Grant) (1865–1958) was a South African human computer and astronomical assistant, and the first South African women's singles tennis champion.

== Biography ==
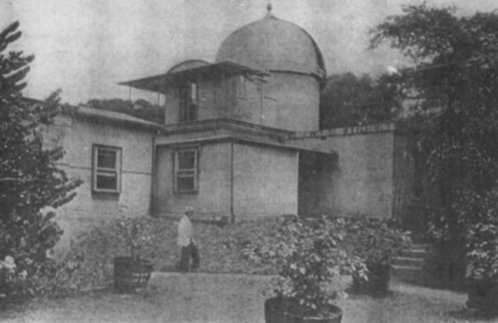
Natal Observatory in 1903.

Mabel Grant was born in Durban, South Africa, the daughter of a merchant, William Grant, and his wife Sarah (née Pilcher).

Mabel Grant became the first South African women's singles tennis champion in 1899. On the event's silver trophy, she is listed as champion three additional times between 1890 and 1893.

=== Human computer ===
Beginning in 1887 (possibly from 1885), she joined three other women who were assisting the government astronomer at the Natal Observatory (located in today's KwaZulu-Natal province of the Republic of South Africa). The women worked during the mornings as human computers, completing complex astronomical calculations, processing meteorological observations and the reduction of tidal observations. In 1890, she was named the Observatory's meteorological assistant and on 1 September 1891, she succeeded John Grant as the senior astronomical assistant.

According to the Report of the Government Astronomer (1903), her job was intricate and demanding: "The senior assistant maintains a general supervision over the whole of the details of the work of the Observatory; carries on the general and astronomical correspondence; assists when required in all observations made between eleven o'clock at night and eight o'clock the next morning; looks after, makes out, checks, and pays all accounts, keeping the necessary books, and preparing and rendering all the returns required by the Government; calculates all the ephemerids, working lists, and tabular places; constructs all auxiliary tables and charts; reduces the magnetic observations and tidal records, and generally takes over the duties of the Junior and Meteorological Assistants when they are absent on leave or from illness."

On 1 July 1902, Mabel Nevill resigned from her observatory position but remained in the job until her successor, R.F. Rendell, arrived in April 1903.

=== Personal life ===
In June 1894, she married the observatory's resident astronomer Edmund Nevill, a member of the Royal Society. Eventually, they had two sons and a daughter. Edmund Nevill remained as a Government Astronomer at the Natal Observatory until it was closed in 1911, after the formation of the Union of South Africa.

Mabel Nevill died in 1958 in the United Kingdom.
