= Cathcart William Methven =

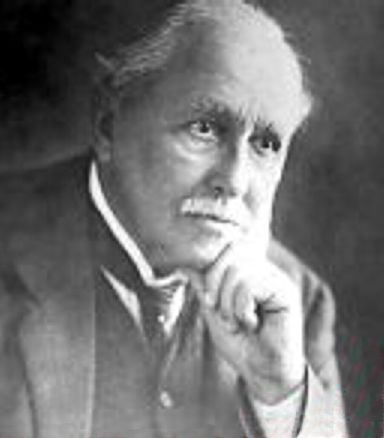
- Born: 24 September 1849; Edinburgh, Scotland
- Died: 30 August 1925 (aged 75); Pietermaritzburg, South Africa
- Known for: Civil engineer and artist

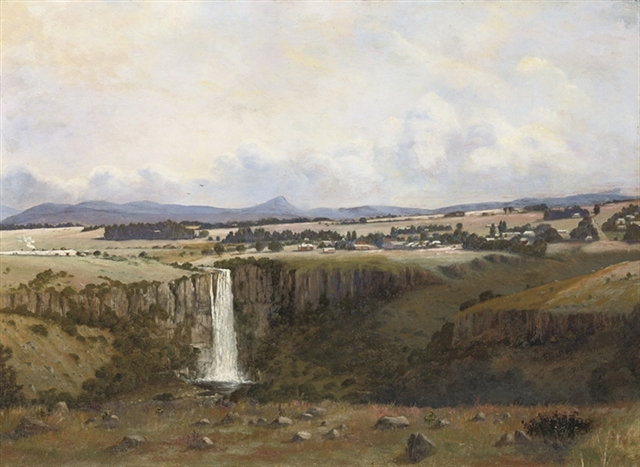
Village of Howick and Umgeni Falls

Cathcart William Methven FRSE (24 September 1849 – 30 August 1925) was a Scottish civil engineer who was Engineer-in-Chief at Greenock on the Clyde, and appointed in 1888 as Harbour Engineer in Durban. Besides being an architect and able musician, he was a gifted landscape artist and produced many fine paintings of Natal scenery. He founded the Durban Art Gallery in 1892.

== Life ==
He was born at 11 Roxburgh Street in Edinburgh on 24 September 1849 the son of William Methven. He is thought to be named after a great uncle, Cpt Cathcart Methven of the East India Company killed in a fall from a horse in Calcutta in 1823.

He was apprenticed as an engineer with John Sang in Kirkcaldy from 1866 70 1871. He then worked with Paley and Austin of Lancaster as Clerk of Works for the reconstruction of St John's Episcopal Church in Greenock. He then joined the London firm of Robert Kinipple as assistant harbour engineer at Greenock in Scotland. In 1886 he replace Kinipple as engineer-in-chief of the Greenock Harbour Trust. As a prominent Victorian engineer, he became a member of the Institution of Civil Engineers (ICE).

In February 1888 he was elected a Fellow of the Royal Society of Edinburgh. His proposers were William Swan, John Gray McKendrick, George Chrystal, and Sir John Murray.

He emigrated to South Africa in autumn 1888, when appointed Durban's harbour engineer, his orders were to remove a sandbar obstructing shipping at the harbour entrance, forcing passengers and cargo to be moved by lighter. Methven's plans to get rid of the bar by extending the North Pier and using the scouring action of tidal currents, brought him into conflict with a prominent lawyer, Attorney General and politician, Harry Escombe, who wanted to rely on dredging alone. Consequently, Methven was dismissed on 11 July 1894. This led to a tremendous uproar ending in Escombe's resignation. Much later, in 1918, the South African government granted him £500 in recognition of his services with development of the harbour. His other recommendation that the Umhlatuzi Lagoon be developed as a second harbour for Natal, was also followed in the 1970s and is now known as Richards Bay.

Not content to remain idle, Methven started his own successful business as consulting civil and marine engineer, architect and surveyor on 13 December 1895. He undertook to survey all harbours on the south-east and southern coastline, ranging from Port St Johns (1897) to Port Alfred, Kalk Bay and Mossel Bay (1901), Richards Bay and Cape Town (1902), East London (1901 and 1910), Lourenço Marques (1909/10) and Beira and Port Elizabeth (1911). Methven was also President of the Natal Institute of Architects (1905–1908) and a Fellow of the Royal Institute of British Architects (FRIBA).

Methven practiced as architect and was one of the founder members of the Natal Institute of Architects. He was an enthusiastic trout fisherman and an accomplished musician.

His involvement in the art world led to his being President of the Natal Society of Artists in 1908, 1912 and 1915. He drew up specifications for the building of the organs in the Durban and Pietermaritzburg Town Halls, and edited A Century of Progress in Natal, 1824–1924 published in Pietermaritzburg. Methven's first solo exhibition took place in Johannesburg in 1921. His work may be seen in the Africana Museum, Durban Art Gallery, Local History Museums, Tatham Art Gallery and the Killie Campbell Collections. He also painted a number of landscapes of his hometown, Greenock.

He died in Pietermaritzburg in South Africa on 30 August 1925.

== Family ==
He was married. His children included Alexander Methven and Iain Lambert Methven.

His assistant, James Buchanan Pentland-Smith, married his eldest daughter.

== Publications ==
- Sketches of Greenock and Its Harbours in 1886. James McKelvie & Sons. 1886.
- Hughes, Nigel (2001). The paintings of the Bay of Natal: a selection of works dating from 1845 to 1982. Privately published. ISBN 978-0-620-27556-9.
- Methven, C.W., ed. (1924). A century of progress in Natal, 1824-1924. Pietermaritzburg: Natal Witness.

== Commemoration ==
Two streets in Durban are named after him, one at Maydon Wharf 29°52′49″S 30°59′55″E and the other in Westville 29°49′00″S 30°54′07″E.
