= Treverton Preparatory School and College =

Coordinates: 29.1996°S 30.0078°E

Treverton Schools
- Mooi River, KwaZulu-Natal; South Africa

Information
- Type: Boarding and Dayscholar
- Motto: Super Astra Spero (Hope Beyond the Stars)
- Religious affiliation: Christian
- Denomination: [Inter denomination]
- Opened: 1964
- Grades: 0000 to 7 in Prep, 8 to Matric in College
- Enrollment: 150 in Prep, 250 in College
- Education system: Independent
- Language: English
- Campus size: 270 hectare
- Accreditation: Independent Examinations Board
- Prep Headmaster: Ross Barrett
- College Headmaster: Kean Broom
- Website: www.treverton.co.za

Treverton Preparatory School and College is a private school and college situated in Mooi River (Umgungundlovu District Municipality), South Africa, catering to boys and girls of all faiths from Grades 0 to 12 and Post-Matric. As a member of the Independent Schools Association of Southern Africa (ISASA), Treverton is an inter-denominational Christian school founded on a Baptist heritage.

== History ==
Peter Binns (grandson of Sir Henry Binns, third prime minister of Natal) opened the Treverton Preparatory School for Boys on the present Prep School site in 1939, serving as Headmaster until his death in 1957. It had been his wish that Treverton continue in perpetuity, but it was "with great sadness and utmost reluctance" that his successor, Douglas Pennington, and the administrators decided to close the school and put the property up for sale in 1961. The Rev Sydney Hudson-Reed, then President of the Baptist Union of South Africa, cherished the idea of establishing a school embracing the Baptist ethos. He visited the derelict Treverton in 1963, shared his enthusiasm with friends and encouraged his brother Derek Hudson-Reed, a teacher at St Stithians College, Johannesburg, to visit the school site.

The five Founders of the Treverton Trust who re-established the school, were the Rev Dr. Syd Hudson-Reed (RIP 2010), Prof John Jonsson (RIP 2011), Dr. Derek Hudson-Reed (RIP 2003), Mr. Wilfred Harland (RIP 1998) and the Rev Rae Trew (RIP 2014).

The Preparatory School opened in 1964 with 51 pupils under the headmastership of Derek Hudson-Reed, who took the school through to the first Matric class in 1970. Girls were first admitted in 1978 and the Post-Matric course started in 1987.

== Academics ==
Treverton College is a mainstream, independent, co-educational school writing the Independent Examinations Board examinations.

Since 1995, it has enjoyed a 100% National Senior Certificate (Matric) pass rate Treverton does not require an entrance examination, but acceptance is dependent on school reports and interviews.

== Environmental education ==
Treverton developed a reputation as a leader in education for sustainable development when it convened a national conference in 1982 at which the Environmental Education Association of Southern Africa (EEASA) met for the first time. The 270-hectare Treverton estate has a variety of ecosystems – wetland, grassland, rocky outcrops, springs, spring dams, catchment area and indigenous forest together with exotic forest and plants.

In 2000, a game fence was erected and the Treverton Wildlife Area (TWA) was established as the first natural, wildlife and game area in South Africa entirely managed by school pupils and staff under the guidance of experts in the field.

Treverton's contribution in the environmental education sector was recognised by the Wildlife and Environment Society of South Africa when it was awarded the WESSA Corporate Award in 2012.
