= John Robinson (Natal politician) =

Sir John Robinson
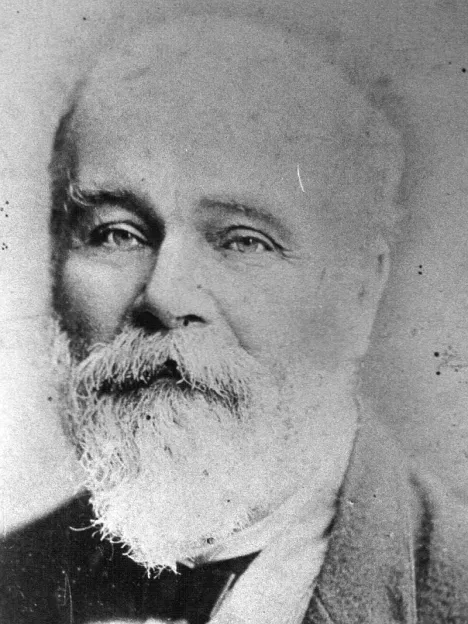

1st Prime Minister of Natal
- In office 4 July 1893 – March 1897
- Monarch: Victoria
- Succeeded by: Henry Binns

Personal details
- Born: 17 March 1839 Kingston upon Hull, East Riding of Yorkshire, England
- Died: 5 November 1903 (aged 64) Durban, Colony of Natal

Sir John Robinson (17 March 1839 – 5 November 1903), born in England, was a journalist and politician. He was the first prime minister of Natal (now part of the KwaZulu-Natal province of South Africa).

== Early life and career ==
Robinson was born in Hull, son of George Eyre Robinson, secretary of the Hull Savings Bank, and his wife Mary Ann; she was the daughter of George Cookman, a businessman and politician. He moved to Natal with his parents in 1850. Coming to a colony which was only seven years old, where there were as yet no secondary schools, he had little chance of education, apart from the stimulus of "cultured parents". Entering the office of the Natal Mercury, which his father started, he cherished leanings towards the life of a missionary, and then towards the law; but he finally accepted the career of journalism. In March 1860 he took over the active management of the paper from his father, whose health had failed. In September 1860 he entered into partnership with Richard Vause, afterwards a prominent mayor of Durban, but himself remained editor.

Arranging for the conduct of the Mercury during his absence, in 1861 he journeyed to England, by the east coast of Africa, Mauritius and the Red Sea, then passing through Egypt and the Middle East; he stayed some five months. He studied the 1862 International Exhibition, and lectured on the colony; he also visited part of the Continent before setting out for Natal again.

Six months after his return in 1863 he was elected to the council for Durban, thus becoming one of the twelve elected members of the legislative council; as a reporter, he had become familiar with its work. But Robinson devoted himself chiefly to his newspaper and literary work. The Natal Mercury passed from a weekly paper to three issues a week, and then to a daily paper. He contributed to the neighbouring press at Cape Town, and to home journals such as the Cornhill Magazine, where his first article, "A South African Watering Place", appeared in 1868. He also found time to write a novel, George Linton (1876). He maintained a reputation as a lecturer, but this work became gradually merged in the more absorbing claims of the political platform.

== Politician ==
After some fifteen years' experience of administration by the crown, Robinson formed a strong opinion in favour of responsible government for Natal. He had been impressed by the troubles of the Langalibalele affair in 1873; he was a delegate for Natal at the South African Conference in London in 1876, and then had to face the Zulu campaign in 1879. Convinced that it was his mission to obtain self-government for the colony, he was opposed by his friend Sir Harry Escombe, and his policy was defeated in the elections of May 1882, when he lost his seat for Durban.

He was nevertheless back in the council in 1884, and in 1887 was chosen as their representative at the Colonial Conference in London of that year. On the occasion of this visit to England he was received by Queen Victoria and presented the colony's loyal address. In 1888 he represented Natal in the South African Customs Conference which led to the formation of the Customs Union. He was created K.C.M.G. in 1889. But he always kept before him the ideal of a self-governed colony, and his writings and speeches gradually convinced his opponents; in 1892 he had the satisfaction of finding Escombe fighting by his side. He was one of the representatives who proceeded to England in that year to press the colonists' views.

Robinson's efforts proved successful, and on 4 July 1893, when the new regime began, he assumed office as the first prime minister of Natal, with the portfolios of Colonial Secretary and Minister of Education. The gradual organisation of a responsible administration was effected quietly, and Robinson's nearly four years of office were uneventful.

== Last years ==
In March 1897 he resigned on account of failing health, hastening his retirement so that his successor might accept the invitation to Queen Victoria's Diamond Jubilee. He went to England that summer in a private capacity, and then on to Rome, of which he was fond, and which he revisited in 1900. In 1898 the legislature voted him a pension of £500 a year. For the rest of his life he mainly lived in retirement at his home, the Gables, Bayside, Durban, where he died on 5 November 1903. He was buried at the Durban cemetery; the staff of the Mercury bore him to his grave.

A statue of him was erected in the Town Gardens of Durban, and some scholarships were also founded from the money subscribed.

Charles Alexander Harris wrote: "Robinson's life was governed by the highest ideals and motives. As a journalist he aimed not only at style and lucidity but at justice and temperance of statement."

== Family ==
He married in 1865 Agnes, daughter of Dr Benjamin Blaine of Verulam, Natal, who survived him; they had three sons and four daughters.

== Publications ==
Robinson published:

- George Linton (1876), a novel
- The Colonies and the Century (1899)
- A Lifetime in South Africa (1900)
