= Francis Farewell =

Founder of the Port Natal Colony in South Africa

- Born: 1784; Near Wincanton, England
- Died: 1829 (aged 44–45); Natal province, South Africa
- Cause of death: Assassination by stabbing
- Spouse: Elizabeth Schmidt (m. 1822)
- Military career
- Allegiance: United Kingdom
- Branch: Navy
- Rank: Lieutenant
- Units: HMS Amphion; HMS Thisbe; HMS Bacchante
- Conflicts: Napoleonic Wars

Francis George Farewell (1784–1829) was the founder of the Port Natal Colony in South Africa.

== Early life ==
Farewell was born at Holbrook House near Wincanton in the Blackmore Vale in 1784. His father was the Reverend Samuel Farewell, who died when Francis was young. Francis and the rest of the Farewell family then moved from Holbrook to Tiverton, Devon. There he became a scholar at Blundell's School until the age of 13, when he left to become a midshipman in the Royal Navy. He first served aboard HMS Amphion, and when that vessel was decommissioned in 1811, Farewell was first transferred to HMS Thisbe and then to HMS Bacchante. Farewell fought against the French in the Napoleonic Wars, including the Battle of Lissa, and he was wounded in several engagements. He ended his service with the rank of lieutenant.

== Cape Colony and Natal ==
After the war, Farewell entered the merchant marine, commanding merchant vessels on the South American and Indian trade routes. In 1820, Farewell arrived in Cape Town in the Cape Colony as the managing owner of the merchant vessel Frances Charlotte. In 1822, he married Elizabeth Caterina Schmidt, the step-daughter of a Cape Town merchant.

In 1823, Farewell was a partner in The Farewell Trading company, which aimed to establish an ivory trade in Natal. In June 1823, Farewell sailed aboard the brig Salisbury as part of the company's first expedition to Natal. Farewell almost drowned in the surf when a landing attempt was made at St. Lucia, but was rescued by a native interpreter. After five weeks at St. Lucia, the expedition headed to Algoa Bay to replenish supplies before heading on to Port Natal, where it was determined a settlement could be established. Farewell returned to Port Natal in July 1824 with a small group of thirty settlers—twenty Boers and ten Englishmen. Farewell also had employed three Khoikhoi servants, and he owned one of the settlement's two support ships, the sloop Julia.

Farewell and his party made contact with King Shaka soon after landing in Zululand, presenting him with a variety of gifts. A month later, in August, Shaka granted around 3,500 acres of land encompassing Port Natal to "F.G. Farewell and Company." Farewell hoisted the British flag over the port on August 27, 1824, and, despite the treaty never being ratified, it formed the basis for all subsequent British claims in the area.

== Death ==
In 1829 Farewell set out for Natal from Port Elizabeth, heading overland with a wagon train loaded with two and a half tons of beads for trade with the Zulus, who were now led by King Dingane, Shaka's half-brother and a conspirator in Shaka's assassination the year before. Farewell was accompanied by Thackwray, a trader, and Walker, a naturalist. When Farewell's wagon train reached the vicinity of the kraal of Qwabe chief Nqetho, he halted the wagon train and set off to visit the chief accompanied by Thackwray, Walker, and eight Zulu and Khoikhoi servants, leaving fellow Port Natal settler John Cane in charge of the wagons.

After being received with what historian Donald R. Morris called "apparent kindness" by Nqetho, Farewell, Thackwray, and Walker set up camp outside the kraal while their servants slept in huts inside the kraal. Before they retired for the night, the servants informed Farewell that Nqetho was not to be trusted, and that the atmosphere inside the kraal was tense, but Farewell ignored them. During the night, Lynx, one of Farewell's servants, slipped out of the kraal to warn Farewell that Nqetho was plotting the deaths of Farewell and his party. Nqetho had recently quarreled with Dingane and considered him an enemy, and was not sympathetic towards Farewell due to his trading with the Zulu king. He also assumed one of Farewell's Zulu servants, who was the son of a Zulu chief, was a spy. But instead of heeding the warning, Farewell called Lynx a coward and went back to sleep.

Just before dawn, Qwabe warriors approached Farewell's tent, cut its ropes, and stabbed Farewell and his comrades to death as they lay trapped beneath the canvas. Lynx, who had armed himself with a musket and was keeping watch, kicked his companions awake upon hearing the assault on Farewell's tent and led them from the kraal. Only Lynx and two others survived to reach the wagon train, but Lynx killed three of their pursuers, despite being wounded several times himself.

Lynx told Cane that Farewell and his party had been slain, causing Cane to promptly lead the rest of the servants into the bush to elude the Qwabe warriors, who soon reached the train and ransacked the wagons, killing all the horses and oxen and taking all of the beads. Cane returned to Grahamstown to reequip, bringing Farewell's ill-fated overland journey to a close. "Farewell had practically invited his own death," Morris opined, "but his death was untimely and regrettable. For all his rapacisousness and occasional chicanery, he deserves most of the credit for founding Port Natal."

== Legacy ==
Farewell Square in Durban is named in his honor.

== In popular culture ==
He was played by Edward Fox in the 1986 television drama Shaka Zulu.
