= Albert Henry Hime =

Irish Royal Engineers officer (1842–1919)

Lieutenant-Colonel The Right Honourable Sir Albert Henry Hime KCMG

4th Prime Minister of Natal
- In office 9 June 1899 – 17 August 1903
- Monarchs: Victoria; Edward VII
- Preceded by: Henry Binns
- Succeeded by: George Morris Sutton

Personal details
- Born: 29 August 1842 Kilcoole, County Wicklow, United Kingdom
- Died: 13 September 1919 (aged 77)
- Spouse: Josephine Searle
- Children: Charles Hime
- Education: Trinity College Dublin
- Occupation: Royal Engineers officer; Politician

Lieutenant-Colonel Sir Albert Henry Hime, KCMG, PC (29 August 1842 – 13 September 1919) was an Irish Royal Engineers officer and later a prominent politician in the Colony of Natal.

== Early life and career ==
Hime was born in Kilcoole, County Wicklow, on the Ballydonarea Loop, and educated at Trinity College Dublin. In May 1866, he married Josephine Searle in Plymouth, and three months later moved to Bermuda to work on a causeway there. Lieutenant Hime began drafting his plan for the Causeway in 1867, and it would take four years before the project was finished. When it was finished, Hime delivered a report to Governor Lefroy in front of some 6,000 residents (approximately half of the population), describing his accomplishment as "solid and substantial...without any attempt at ornament" which would have increased the project's cost (the cost of construction, £27,000, was £2,000 more than the colonial government raised in total revenues that year). Lefroy responded that Hime's name would become part of Bermuda's history and that the young lieutenant would have a promising career. Hime was awarded a service plate from the colonial government.

In 1878, Hime designed and built the Natal Mounted Police Headquarters on Alexandra Road. His son Charles represented Natal at cricket and played Test cricket for South Africa in 1896.

== Premier of Natal ==
On 9 June 1899, Hime was appointed as the Premier of Natal, a position which he held until 17 August 1903. The premiership included the years of the Second Boer War in the South African colonies between October 1899 and the Peace of Vereeniging in June 1902. Commenting on the peace settlement, Hime in September 1902 stated that "there was naturally a little soreness against rebels who at the commencement of the war fought for the Boers; but he recognized the fact that both races had to live together ... he believed the Boers would settle down and become as peaceable and loyal as other subjects of the British Crown.″

As Premier, he attended the Coronation of King Edward VII and Queen Alexandra and the conference of Colonial Premiers in London in 1902.

During his visit to the United Kingdom in 1902, he received the honorary degree LL.D. from the University of Cambridge in May, from the University of Edinburgh in July, and from the University of Dublin later the same year. He was also awarded the Freedom of the City of Edinburgh during a visit to the city on 26 July 1902, and appointed a Privy Counsellor on 11 August 1902, following an announcement of the King's intention to make this appointment in the 1902 Coronation Honours list published in June that year.

== Legacy ==
The hamlet of Himeville, in the KwaZulu-Natal midlands, is named after him as part of his legacy as Premier of Natal.
