= Charles John Smythe =

Charles John Smythe (21 April 1852 – May 1918) was prime minister of the Colony of Natal from 1905 to 1906.

He was the grandfather of Victoria Cross winner Quentin Smythe.
