= Harry Escombe =

South African statesman

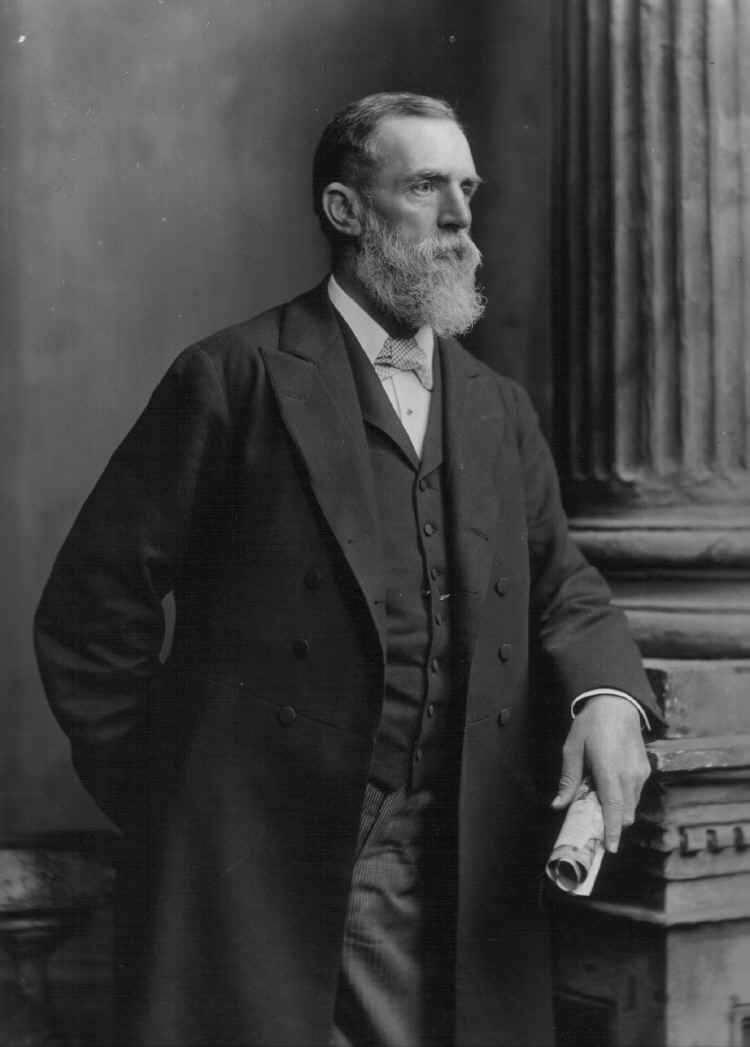
Rt. Hon. Harry Escombe (1838–1899), Premier of Natal

Harry Escombe PC (25 July 1838 – 27 December 1899) was a South African statesman. Born in London, Escombe emigrated to the Colony of Natal. There he worked as a lawyer. He was briefly prime minister of the colony in 1897 and died two years later.

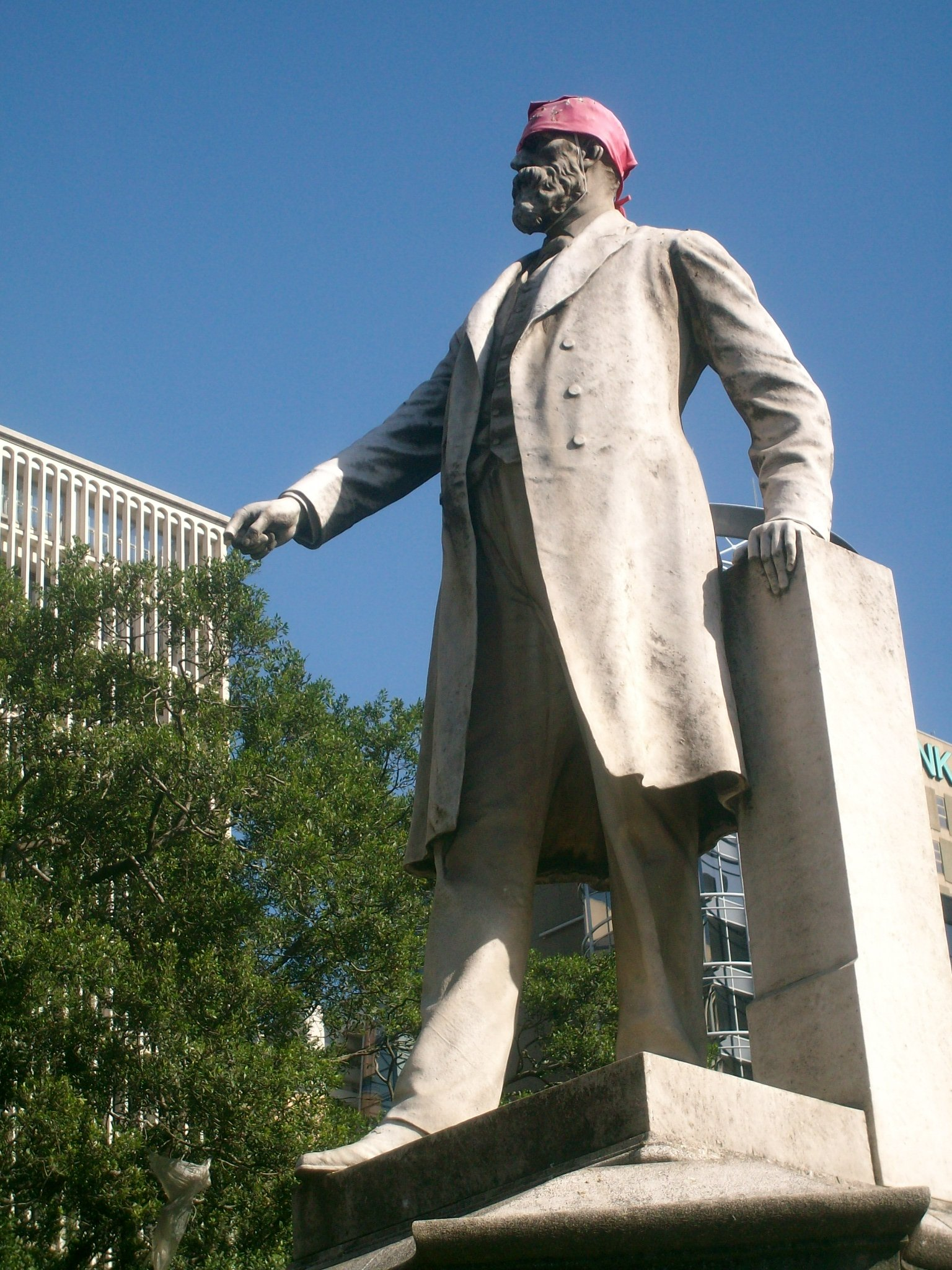
City Hall and Memorial Gardens. 263 West Street, Durban.

== Early life ==
A member of a Somersetshire family, Escombe was born at Notting Hill, London, and was educated at St Paul's School.

After four years in a stockbroker's office, he emigrated, in 1859, to the Cape. The following year he moved to the Colony of Natal, and, after trying other occupations, qualified as an attorney.

== Career ==
Escombe became recognized as the ablest pleader in the colony, and, in 1872, was elected for Durban as a member of the legislative council, and subsequently was also placed on the executive council. In 1880 he secured the appointment of a harbour board for Natal, and was himself made chairman. The transformation of the port of Durban into a harbour available for ocean liners was as a result of his and Cathcart William Methven's work.

In 1888–1889 he defended Dinizulu and other Zulu chiefs against a charge of high treason. For several years he opposed the grant of responsible government to Natal, but by 1890 had become convinced of its desirability, and on its conferment in 1893 he joined the first ministry formed, serving under Sir John Robinson as attorney-general. In February 1897, on Sir John's retirement, Escombe became premier, remaining attorney-general and also holding the office of minister of education and minister of defence.

In the summer of that year he was in London with the other colonial premiers at the celebration of the Diamond Jubilee of Queen Victoria, and was made a member of the privy council. Cambridge University conferred upon him the honorary degree of LL.D. The election that followed his return to Natal proved unfavourable to his policy, and he was succeeded in office, in October 1897, by Sir Henry Binns. Throughout his life he took an active interest in national defence. He had served in the Zulu War of 1879 in the Durban Mounted Reserve, was commander of the Natal Naval Volunteers and received the volunteer long service decoration. In October 1899 he went to the northern confines of the colony to take part in preparing measures of defence against the invasion by the Boers.

On 13 January 1897, Mahatma Gandhi arrived on a ship with his family in Natal docks. Escombe criticized Gandhi in the media due to the unpopularity of the Indian immigration at the time.

Escombe was instrumental in the creation of the Natal Observatory. In 1882 David Gill, director of the Royal Observatory, Cape of Good Hope, requested the government of Natal to establish an astronomical observatory at Durban, in anticipation of the transit of Venus on 4 December that year. A site for the observatory was chosen in the southwest corner of the Natal Botanic Gardens. Escombe equipped the observatory with an 8-inch refractor from which he personally bought from Grubb for £600.

He lived at 15 Beach Grove in Durban in a house designed by Philip Maurice Dudgeon.

== Legacy ==
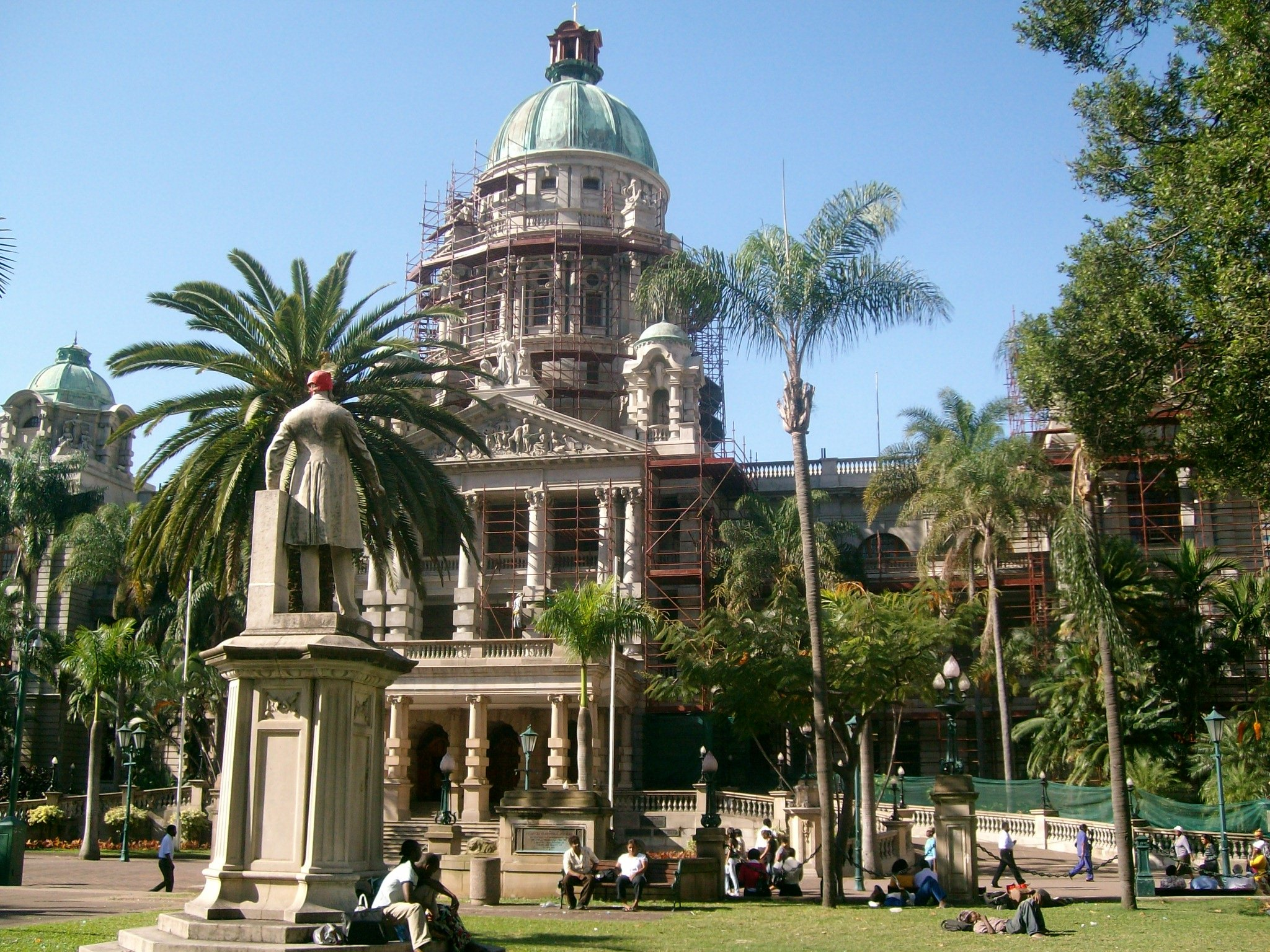
Durban City Hall, 263 West Street, Durban. 1883. Has Merorial Gardens too. 02

He is commemorated with a statue on Francis Farewell Square outside the Durban City Hall. A Durban Harbour tug was named in his honour. A suburb in Queensburgh 29°52′20″S 30°53′57″E in Durban is named after him.

== Notes and references ==
- Laband, John (18 May 2009). Historical Dictionary of the Zulu Wars. Scarecrow Press. ISBN 978-0-8108-6300-2.
- Henderson, J. T., ed. (1904). Speeches of the Late Right Honourable Harry Escombe. Pietermaritzburg: P. Davis & Sons.
- Kearney, B.T. (1972). "A House for Harry" (PDF). Natalia. 2. Natal Society Foundation: 21–23.
- Herman, Arthur (2010). Gandhi and Churchill: The Rivalry That Destroyed an Empire and Forged Our Age. Random House. ISBN 978-1-4090-6363-6.
- Gandhi, Mohandas (2012). Autobiography: The Story of My Experiments with Truth. Courier Corporation. ISBN 978-0-486-11751-5.
