= Henry Binns =

English Prime Minister of the Colony of Natal

Sir Henry Binns KCMG

3rd Prime Minister of Natal
- In office 4 October 1897 – 8 June 1899
- Monarch: Victoria
- Preceded by: Harry Escombe
- Succeeded by: Albert Henry Hime

Personal details
- Born: 27 June 1837 Sunderland, County Durham, England, United Kingdom
- Died: 6 June 1899 (aged 61) Colony of Natal

Sir Henry Binns, KCMG (27 June 1837 – 6 June 1899) was Prime Minister of the Colony of Natal from 5 October 1897 – 8 June 1899.

== Life ==
Born into a Quaker family in Sunderland, County Durham on 27 June 1837, he was the eldest son of Henry Binns (a leading member of the Chartist Movement) and Elizabeth Bowron. He attended Ackworth School in Pontefract, Yorkshire, from 1847 to 1852, before completing his education in York.

Henry Binns emigrated to Natal in 1858. Not long after his arrival in the colony, he turned out to play for the "Champions of Durban" against the Maritzburg Cricket Club on 2 May 1860 in what has been described as 'the first major cricket match' to have been played in Durban.

Commissioned as the first adjutant of the Victoria Mounted Rifles in 1862, Binns took command of the volunteer unit (which was subsumed into the Natal Mounted Rifles in 1888) in 1875.

He established himself in the sugar industry – owning the Sunderland estate and setting up the Umhlanga Valley Sugar Estate Company together with Robert Acutt in 1868 – before being appointed by Sir Garnet Wolseley (Garnet Wolseley, 1st Viscount Wolseley) as a nominated member of the colony's Legislative Council in 1879. When the council was transformed into an elective assembly in 1883, Binns was elected member for Victoria County – originally by a majority of only one vote – retaining his seat until his death, 16 years later . An account published in the Natal Witness newspaper in 1963 described Binns, the legislator, as 'having a caustic manner in the Natal Parliament and his clashes with the Colonial Secretary became almost legendary. Both were masters of an eye-glass and the pantomimic use of these was always worth watching. The method of brandishing the eye-glass was usually a forerunner of what sort of retort was coming.' Elsewhere he has been described as 'a pungent speaker, who rarely wasted words'.

One of his most important achievements as a member of the Legislative Council before the grant of responsible government in 1893 was his role in obtaining the extension of the Natal Government Railways line to Harrismith in the neighbouring Orange Free State republic. Binns was later appointed by the Legislative Council to lead a delegation to India in 1894 to obtain the approval of the Indian Government to a proposal that Indian indentured labourers working on the canefields in Natal who did not return to India at the end of their indenture contracts should be subject to an annual tax of £25. The proposal did not find favour with Lord Elgin (Victor Bruce, 9th Earl of Elgin), the Viceroy of India, and an annual tax of £3 was subsequently imposed. This measure caused significant resentment amongst the Natal Indian community and was strongly opposed by the Natal Indian Congress, as recorded by Mahatma Gandhi in The Story of My Experiments with Truth sv The £3 Tax. Sir Henry, however, was an outspoken opponent of the introduction, under the government of Harry Escombe, of the Dealers' Licences Act of 1897, which unfairly hampered the ability of Indians to carry on trade as merchant traders in the colony. Binns described the Act as 'an un-British measure'.

Binns succeeded the Rt. Hon. Harry Escombe P.C. as prime minister in October 1897. He was known to favour good relations with the neighbouring South African Republic (ZAR) under President Paul Kruger, a position which caused tensions with some of the fiercely pro-imperialist members of his cabinet, such as Albert Hime (Sir Albert Henry Hime) and Henry Bale (later, Sir Henry Bale, Chief Justice of Natal from 1901 to 1910); and with the newly appointed High Commissioner in South Africa, Sir Alfred Milner (Alfred Milner, 1st Viscount Milner). It was nevertheless under his premiership, in May 1898, that Natal joined the OFS-Cape Colony customs union, which reduced Natal's economic ties with the Transvaal.

He died in office on 6 June 1899 in British South East Africa. He was buried at the military cemetery in Durban. His successor in office was Sir Albert Hime.

Binns also served on the boards of the Natal Bank and the Durban Tramway Company.

== Family ==
Binns married Clara Acutt, whom he had met when they were fellow passengers on the ship Early Morn from England as immigrants to Natal in 1858. His only surviving child, Percy Binns KC, was a contemporary of Mahatma Gandhi at the Natal Bar and later became Chief Magistrate of Durban. Treverton Preparatory School at Mooi River was founded by Sir Henry's grandson, Peter Binns.

A bust of Sir Henry Binns, as well as a memorial plaque in his honour, grace the vestibule to the Legislative Building of the KwaZulu-Natal Legislature in Pietermaritzburg.

== See also ==
- Colony of Natal
- Harry Escombe
