= Colony of Natal =

British colony from 1843 to 1910

- 1843–1910
- Flag Coat of arms
- Anthem: God Save the Queen (1843–1901); God Save the King (1901–1910)
- Status: British colony
- Capital: Pietermaritzburg
- Common languages: Dutch, Afrikaans, English, Zulu, Xhosa, Gujarati, Hindi-Urdu, Bhojpuri, Awadhi, Tamil, Telugu, Chinese, and others
- Ethnic groups (1904): 81.53% Black; 9.10% Asian; 8.75% White; 0.60% Coloured
- Religion: Anglican, Dutch Reformed, Hindu, Presbyterian, Roman Catholic, Islam
- Government: Constitutional monarchy
- Monarch
  - 1843–1901: Victoria
  - 1901–1910: Edward VII
  - 1910: George V
- Governor
  - 1843–1844: Henry Cloete
  - 1910: Paul Methuen, 3rd Baron Methuen
- Historical era: Imperialism
  - Established: 4 May 1843
  - Annexed Zululand: 1897
  - Merged into Union of South Africa as Natal Province: 31 May 1910

Area
- 1904: 91,610 km^{2} (35,370 sq mi)

Population
  - 1904: 1,108,754
Preceded by	Succeeded by
Natalia Republic; Zulu Kingdom	Union of South Africa
- Today part of: South Africa

The Colony of Natal was a British colony in south-eastern Africa. It was proclaimed a British colony on 4 May 1843 after the British government had annexed the Boer Republic of Natalia, and on 31 May 1910 was combined with three other colonies to form the Union of South Africa as one of its provinces. In 1994 it became the KwaZulu-Natal province of South Africa.

It was originally only about half the size of the new province, with the north-eastern boundaries formed by the Tugela and Buffalo rivers beyond which lay the independent Kingdom of Zululand (kwaZulu in the Zulu language).

Fierce conflict with the Zulu population led to the evacuation of Durban, and eventually, the Boers accepted British annexation in 1844 under military pressure. A British governor was appointed to the region and many settlers emigrated from Europe and the Cape Colony. The British established a sugar cane industry in the 1860s. Farm owners had a difficult time attracting Zulu labourers to work on their plantations, so the British brought thousands of indentured labourers from India. As a result of the importation of Indian labourers, Durban became the home to the largest concentration of Indians outside India.

== History ==
=== British settlement ===
In 1823 Francis Farewell, formerly a lieutenant in the British navy, with other merchants of Cape Town, formed a company to trade with the natives of the south-east coast. In the brig Salisbury, commanded by James S. King, who had been a midshipman in the navy, Farewell visited Port Natal, St Lucia and Delagoa Bays. The voyage was not successful as a trading venture, but Farewell was so impressed with the possibilities of Natal both for trade and colonization that he resolved to establish himself at the port. He went on with ten companions, among them Henry Francis Fynn. All the rest save Farewell and Fynn speedily returned to the Cape, but the two who remained were joined by three sailors, John Cane, Henry Ogle and Thomas Holstead. Farewell, Fynn and the others went to the royal kraal of Shaka, and, having cured him of a wound and made him various presents, obtained a document, dated 7 August 1824, ceding to "F. G. Farewell & Company entire and full possession in perpetuity" a tract of land including "the port or harbour of Natal". On the 27th of the same month, Farewell declared the territory he had acquired a British possession. In 1825 he was joined by King, who had meantime visited England and had obtained from the government a letter of recommendation to Lord Charles Somerset, governor of the Cape, granting King permission to settle at Natal. Farewell, King and Fynn made independent settlements at various parts of the bay.

In 1834, a petition from Cape Town merchants asking for the creation of a British colony at Natal was met by the statement that the Cape finances would not permit the establishment of a new dependency. The merchants, however, dispatched an expedition under Dr Andrew Smith to inquire into the possibilities of the country, and the favourable nature of his report induced a party of Boers under Piet Uys, including Jan Bantjes, to go there also. Both Smith and Uys travelled overland through Kaffraria, and were well received by the English living at the bay. The next step was taken by the settlers at the port, who in 1835 resolved to lay out a town, which they named Durban, after Benjamin D'Urban, then governor of Cape Colony. At the same time the settlers, who numbered about 50, sent a memorial to the governor calling attention to the fact that they were acknowledged rulers over a large tract of territory south of the Tugela River, and asking that this territory should be proclaimed a British colony and that a governor and council be appointed. To all these requests no official answer was returned. The settlers had been joined in the year named (1835) by Allen Francis Gardiner, a naval officer, whose chief object was the evangelization of the natives. With the support of the traders he founded a mission station on the hill overlooking the bay. In 1837 Gardiner was given authority by the British government to exercise jurisdiction over the traders. They, however, refused to acknowledge Gardiner's authority, and from the Cape government he received no support.

The next wave of immigration consisted of Voortrekkers fleeing British rule in Cape Colony, who pushed out the English settlers at Port Natal. In May 1838 the Boers took control of the port and soon afterwards established the Natalia Republic. The Republic suffered from disorganized government and poor relations with the Zulus. On 2 December 1841, Sir George Thomas Napier, governor of Cape Colony, issued a proclamation declaring his intent to resume British military occupation of Port Natal. Most of the Voortrekkers left by 1843.

=== British annexation ===
Natal was proclaimed a British colony in 1843, and administered from the Cape Colony in 1844. However, it was not until the end of 1845 that an effective administration was installed with Martin West as lieutenant-governor that the power of the Boer Volksraad finally came to an end.

In April 1842 Lord Stanley, then Secretary of State for War and the Colonies in the second Peel Administration, wrote to Sir George Napier that the establishment of a colony in Natal would be attended with little prospect of advantage, but at the same time stated that the pretensions of the emigrants to be regarded as an independent community could not be admitted. Various measures were proposed which would but have aggravated the situation. Finally, in deference to the strongly urged views of Sir George Napier, Lord Stanley, in a despatch of 13 December, received in Cape Town on 23 April 1843, consented to Natal becoming a British colony. The institutions adopted were to be as far as possible in accordance with the wishes of the people, but it was a fundamental condition "that there should not be in the eye of the law any distinction or disqualification whatever, founded on mere difference of colour, origin, language or creed". Sir George then appointed Henry Cloete (a brother of Colonel Cloete) a special commissioner to explain to the Natal volksraad the decision of the government.

There was a considerable party of Natal Boers still strongly opposed to the British, and they were reinforced by numerous bands of Boers who came over the Drakensberg from Winburg and Potchefstroom. Commandant Jan Mocke of Winburg (who had helped to besiege Captain Smith at Durban) and others of the "war party" attempted to induce the volksraad not to submit, and a plan was formed to murder Pretorius, Boshof and other leaders, who were now convinced that the only chance of ending the state of complete anarchy into which the country had fallen was by accepting British sovereignty. In these circumstances, the task of Henry Cloete was one of great difficulty and delicacy. He behaved with the utmost tact and got rid of the Winburg and Potchefstroom burghers by declaring that he should recommend the Drakensberg as the northern limit of Natal. On 8 August 1843, the Natal volksraad unanimously agreed to the terms proposed by Lord Stanley. Many of the Boers who would not acknowledge British rule trekked once more over the mountains into what are now the Orange Free State and Transvaal provinces. At the end of 1843, there were not more than 500 Dutch families left in Natal.

Cloete, before returning to the Cape, visited Mpande and obtained from him a valuable concession. Hitherto the Tugela from source to mouth had been the recognized frontier between Natal and Zululand. Mpande gave up to Natal all the territory between the Buffalo and Tugela rivers, now forming Klip River county.

=== Growth of the colony ===
The colony's early population growth was driven by settlement from the United Kingdom between 1849 and 1851, with approximately 4500 emigrants between 1848 and 1851. From the time of the coming of the first considerable body of British settlers dates the development of trade and agriculture in the colony, followed somewhat later by the exploitation of the mineral resources of the country. At the same time schools were established and various churches began or increased their work in the colony. John Colenso, appointed bishop of Natal, arrived in 1854. In 1856 the dependence of the country on Cape Colony was put to an end and Natal constituted a distinct colony with a legislative council of sixteen members, twelve elected by the inhabitants and four nominated by the Crown. At the time the population of settlers and their descendants exceeded 8000. While dependent on the Cape, ordinances had been passed establishing Roman-Dutch law as the law of Natal, and save where modified by legislation, it remained in force.

On 14 September 1876, the Colonial Office in the UK received a telegram from Sir Henry Barkly in Cape Town of the imminent collapse of the Transvaal, because the Transvaal's President Burger and his men had been routed after their attack on Sekhukhune and his people the Pedi. This galvanized Henry Herbert, 4th Earl of Carnarvon who obtained permission from Disraeli to appoint Sir Theophilus Shepstone (known by the Zulu honorific as Somtseu meaning '’father of the nation'’) who had served for 30 years as a Natal administrator, first as Diplomatic Agent to Native Tribes, then as secretary for native affairs, to act as special commissioner to the Transvaal. On 15 December 1876, Shepstone with 25 troopers from the Natal Mounted Police and others set out from Pietermaritzburg to Pretoria to annex the Transvaal; arriving on 27 January 1877 to a cordial reception. That controversial British annexation of the Transvaal, was disrupted when Sekhukhune allegedly signed a peace treaty with the Boers removing the main justification for British intervention in the Transvaal at that time. Nonetheless, tensions between the British colonists and the Zulu continued to build, culminating in the Anglo-Zulu War. After an initial defeat the British were able to conquer Zululand, where they established a protectorate over a sub-divided kingdom. However, this proved unsatisfactory to the colonial government, and eighteen years later the kingdoms were annexed to the Natal colony, doubling its size.

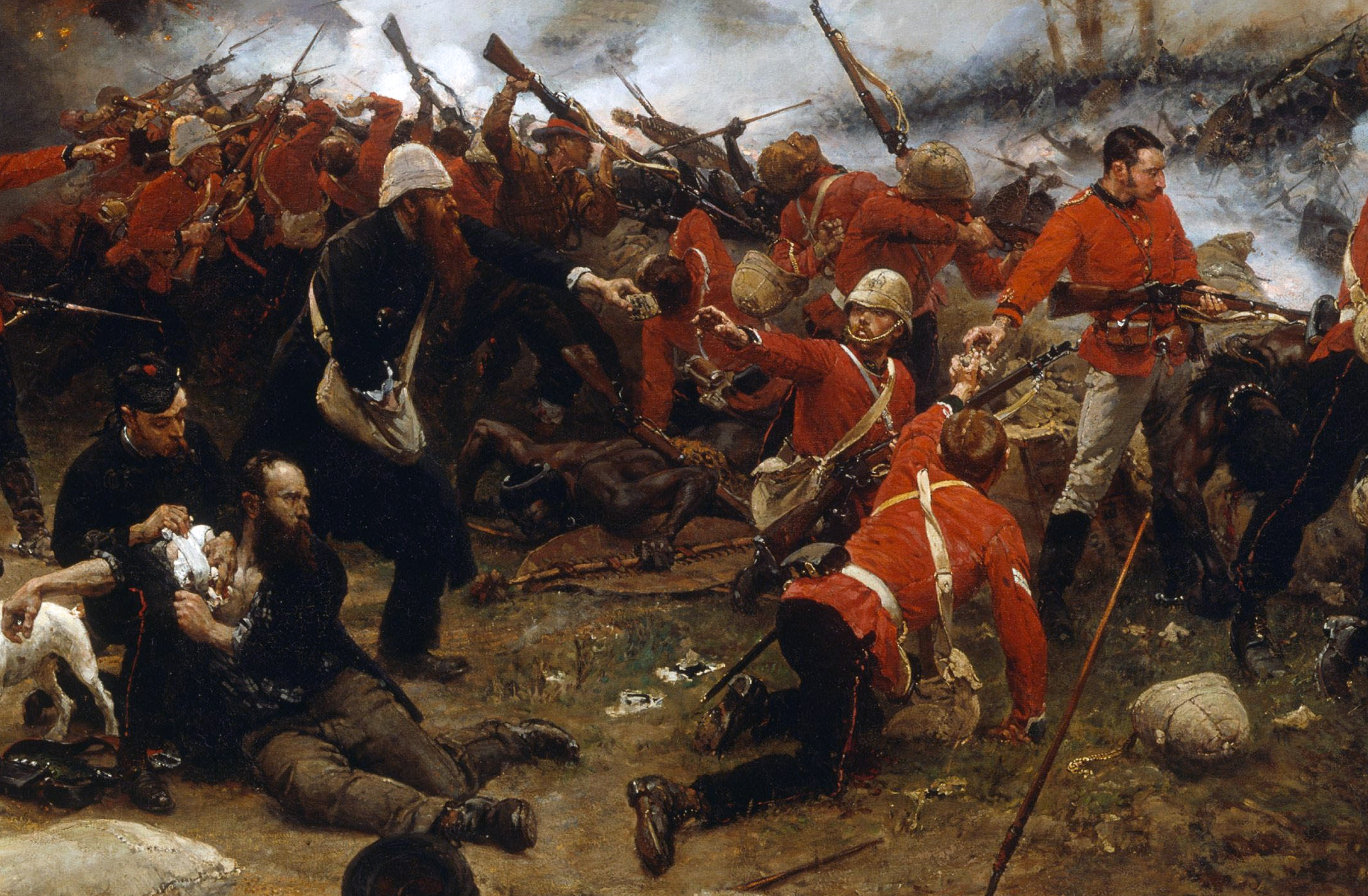
Detail of a painting depicting the Battle of Rorke's Drift during the Anglo-Zulu War 11 January – 4 July 1879

In 1884, the Witwatersrand Gold Rush caused a considerable rush of colonists from Natal to the Transvaal. Railways were still far from the Transvaal border, and Natal offered the nearest route for prospectors from Cape Colony or from Europe. Durban was soon thronged; and Pietermaritzburg, which was then practically the terminus of the Natal railway, was the base from which nearly all the expeditions to the goldfields were fitted out. The journey to De Kaap by bullock-waggon occupied about six weeks. "Kurveying" (the conducting of transport by bullock-waggon) in itself constituted a great industry. Two years later, in 1886, the Rand goldfields were proclaimed, and the tide of trade which had already set in with the Transvaal steadily increased. Natal colonists were not merely the first in the field with the transport traffic to the new goldfields; they became some of the earliest proprietors of mines, and for several years many of the largest mining companies had their chief offices at Pietermaritzburg or Durban. In this year (1886) the railway reached Ladysmith, and in 1891 it was completed to the Transvaal frontier at Charlestown, the section from Ladysmith northward opening up the Dundee and Newcastle coalfields. Thus a new industry was added to the resources of the colony.

The demand which the growing trade made upon the one port of Natal, Durban, encouraged the colonists to redouble their efforts to improve the Port of Durban. A heavy sea from the Indian Ocean is always breaking on the shore, even in the finest weather, and at the mouth of every natural harbour a bar occurs. To deepen the channel over the bar at Durban so that steamers might enter the harbour was the cause of labour and expenditure for many years. Harbour works were begun in 1857, piers and jetties were constructed, dredgers imported, and controversy raged over the various schemes for harbour improvement. In 1881 a harbour board was formed under the chairmanship of Harry Escombe. It controlled the operations for improving the sea entrance until 1893 when on the establishment of responsible government it was abolished. The work of improving the harbour was, however, continued with vigour, and finally, in 1904, such success was achieved that vessels of the largest class were enabled to enter port. At the same time, the railway system was continually developing under the Natal Railway Company.

For many years there had been an agitation among the colonists for self-government. In 1882 the colony was offered self-government coupled with the obligations of self-defence. The offer was declined, but in 1883 the legislative council was remodelled so as to consist of 23 elected and 7 nominated members. In 1890 the elections to the council led to the return of a majority in favour of accepting self-government, and in 1893 a bill establishing responsible government was passed and received the sanction of the Imperial government. At the time the white inhabitants numbered about 50,000. The electoral law was framed to prevent more than a very few natives obtaining suffrage. Restrictions in this direction dated as far back as 1865, while in 1896 an act was passed aimed at the exclusion of Indians from the suffrage. The leader of the party which sought responsible government was John Robinson who had gone to Natal in 1850, was a leading journalist in the colony, had been a member of the legislative council since 1863, and had filled various official positions. He now became the first premier and colonial secretary with Harry Escombe as attorney-general and F. R. Moor as secretary for Native Affairs.

John Robinson remained premier until 1897, a year marked by the annexation of Zululand to Natal. In 1898, Natal entered the Customs Union already existing between Cape Colony and the Orange Free State.

=== The Langalibalele Affair ===
On 13 December 1873, Chief Langalibalele was captured by the Natal Government and taken for trial in Pietermaritzburg. This was the culmination of a long and tedious stand off between the chief and the Colonial Government.

Langalibalele was the chief of the Hlubu (or amaHlbubi) tribe in northern Natal. He had failed to enforce an 1872 law that compelled all Africans in Natal to register their firearms with their local magistrate. When told to enforce the law by Resident Magistrate John Macfarlane, Langalibalele said, how one can "count the maggots in a piece of beef?". Langalibalele was then called to appear before the Secretary of Native Affairs, Theophilus Shepstone, in Pietermaritzburg twice, both times refusing. On the 30 October 1873 a Corps of Colonial Volunteer troops moved towards the Hlubi 'location'. The Hlubi began to flee. On 2 November 1873 Shepstone issued an order giving the Hlubi 24 hours to surrender or face the consequence of rebellion. On 4 November 1873 the Hlubi and Volunteer Corps came face to face and 3 colonists and 1 Mosotho were killed. The colonial forces then 'broke up' the tribe, seizing cattle, killing not just the men, but the women and children too. Survivors were 'apprenticed' to colonist and removed from their land.

=== Boer War and aftermath ===
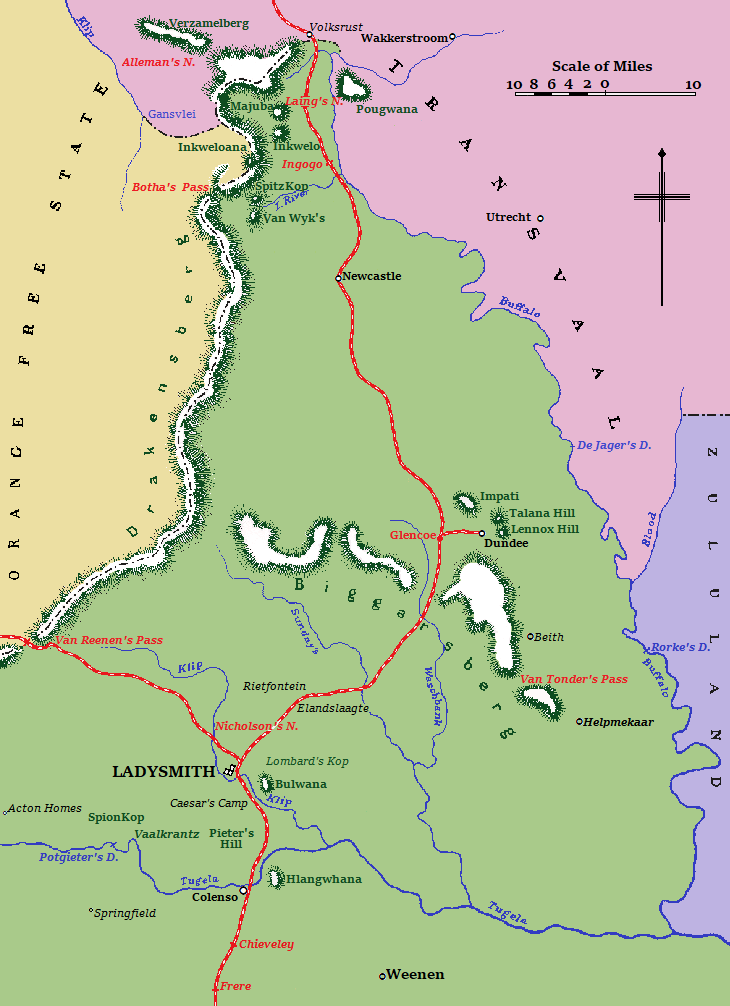
War theatre in northern Natal

The Second Boer War broke out on 11 October 1899 with the Boer seizure of a Natal train on the Orange Free State border. Boer forces quickly occupied Newcastle. A landdrost was appointed and the town was renamed Viljoensdorp. In the Battle of Talana Hill on 20 October 1899, outside Dundee, British forces under William Penn Symons defeated the Boer columns, but failed to prevent their escape due to the fraudulent use of Red Cross flags by the Boers. The British withdrew to Ladysmith. Boer forces proceeded to Ladysmith and surrounded the town, cutting off its communications from the south. The Siege of Ladysmith lasted until 28 February 1900, when the town was relieved by forces under Redvers Buller. During the six weeks previous to the relief, 200 deaths had occurred from disease alone, and altogether as many as 8424 were reported to have passed through the hospitals. The relief of Ladysmith soon led to the evacuation of Natal by the Boer forces, who trekked northwards.

As one result of the war, an addition was made to the territory of Natal, consisting of a portion of what had previously been included in the Transvaal. The districts transferred to Natal were: Vryheid, Utrecht and such portion of the district of Wakkerstroom as was encompassed by a line drawn from the north-eastern corner of Natal, east by Volksrust in a northerly direction to the summit of the Drakensberg Range, along that range, passing just north of the town of Wakkerstroom, to the headwaters of the Pongola River (now called Phongolo River), and thence following the river to the border of the Utrecht district.

The districts added to Natal contained about 6,000 white inhabitants (mostly Afrikaners), and some 92,000 natives, and had an area of nearly 7,000 square miles (18,000 km^{2}), so that this annexation meant an addition to the white population of Natal of about one-tenth, to her native population of about one-tenth also, and to her territory of about one-fourth. An act authorizing the annexation was passed during 1902 and the territories were formally transferred to Natal in January 1903.

The period following the war was succeeded by commercial depression, though in Natal it was not so severely felt as in other states of South Africa. The government met the crisis by renewed energy in harbour works, railway constructions and the development of the natural resources of the country. A railway to the Zululand coalfields was completed in 1903, and in the same year a line was opened to Vryheid in the newly annexed territories. Natal further built several railway lines in the eastern half of the Orange River Colony, thus opening up new markets for her produce and facilitating her transit trade. In August 1903 the Hime ministry resigned and was succeeded by a cabinet under the premiership of George Sutton, the founder of the wattle industry in Natal and one of the pioneers in the coal-mining industry. In May 1905 Sutton was replaced by a coalition ministry under Charles John Smythe, who had been colonial secretary under Hime. These somewhat frequent changes of ministry reflected, chiefly, differences concerning the treatment of commercial questions and the policy to be adopted towards the natives. All Dutch colonists who had joined the Boer forces during the war were pardoned.

As early as July 1903, rumours were current that Dinuzulu, king of the Zulus, was disaffected. Dinuzulu, however, remained at the time quiescent, though the Zulus were in a state of excitement over incidents connected with the Boer war, when they had been subject to raids by Boer commandoes, and on one occasion at least had retaliated. Unrest was also manifested among the natives west of the Tugela, but it was not at first cause for alarm. During 1903–1904 a Native Affairs' Commission, representative of all the states, obtained evidence on the status and conditions of the natives. Its investigations pointed to the loosening of tribal ties and to the corresponding growth of a spirit of individual independence. Among its recommendations was the direct political representation of natives in the colonial legislatures on the New Zealand model, and the imposition of direct taxation upon natives, which should not be less than £ 1 a year payable by every adult male. The commission also called attention to the numerical insufficiency of magistrates and native commissioners in certain parts of Natal. With some of the recommendations the Natal commissioners disagreed; in 1905, however, an act was passed by the Natal legislature imposing a poll tax of £1 on all males over 18 in the colony, except indentured Indians and natives paying hut tax (which was 14 shillings a year). Every European was bound to pay the tax.

In 1906, the Bambatha Rebellion broke out in the colony, attributable ostensibly to the poll tax, and spread to Zululand. It was suppressed by the colonial forces under Colonel Duncan McKenzie, aided by a detachment of Transvaal volunteers. Bhambatha, a chief in the Greytown district who had been deposed for misconduct, kidnapped the regent appointed in his stead. He was pursued and escaped to Zululand, where he received considerable help. He was killed in battle in June, and by the close of July the rebellion was at an end. Dinuzulu, accused by many colonists of having incited the rebellion, protested his loyalty to the British. As time went on, however, the Natal government, alarmed at a series of murders of whites in Zululand and at the evidences of continued unrest among the natives, became convinced that Dinuzulu was implicated in the rebellious movement. (When a young man, in 1889, he had been convicted of high treason and had been exiled, but in 1897 he had been allowed to return.) Now a force under Duncan McKenzie entered Zululand. Thereupon Dinizulu surrendered (December 1907) without opposition, and was removed to Pietermaritzburg. His trial was delayed until November 1908, and it was not until March 1909 that judgment was given, the court finding him guilty only on the minor charge of harbouring rebels. Meantime, in February 1908, the governor—Matthew Nathan, who had succeeded Henry McCallum in August 1907—had made a tour in Zululand, on which occasion some 1500 of the prisoners taken in the rebellion of 1906 were released.

The intercolonial commission had dealt with the native question as it affected South Africa as a whole; it was felt that a more local investigation was needed, and in August 1906, a strong commission was appointed to inquire into the condition of the Natal natives. The general election which was held in the following month turned on native policy and on the measures necessary to meet the commercial depression. The election, which witnessed the return of four Labour members, resulted in a ministerial majority of a somewhat heterogeneous character, and in November 1906 Smythe resigned, being succeeded by Frederick Moor, who in his election campaign had criticized the Smythe ministry for their financial proposals. Moor remained premier until the office was abolished by the establishment of the Union of South Africa. In August 1907 the report of the Native Affairs' Commission was published. The commission declared that the chasm between the natives and settlers had been broadening for years and that the efforts of the administration—especially since the grant of responsible government — to reconcile the natives to the changed conditions of rule and policy and to convert them into an element of strength had been ineffective. It was not sufficient to secure them, as the government had done, peace and ample means of livelihood. The commission among other proposals for a more liberal and sympathetic native policy urged the creation of a native advisory Board entrusted with very wide powers. "Personal rule", they declared, "supplies the keynote of successful native control". The unrest in Zululand delayed action being taken on the commission's report. But in 1909 an act was passed which placed native affairs in the hands of four district commissioners, gave to the minister for native affairs direct executive authority and created a council for native affairs on which non-official members had seats. While the district commissioners were intended to keep in close touch with the natives, the council was to act as a "deliberative, consultative and advisory body."

On 31 May 1910, the Colony of Natal became Natal Province, one of the founding provinces of the Union of South Africa.

== Sugar and Indian labourers ==
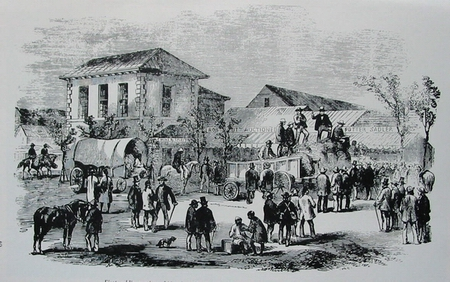
First public auction of Natal sugar, Durban, 1855

The British settlers quickly realised that the coastlands were suited to the cultivation of tropical or semi-tropical products, and from 1852 onward sugar, coffee, cotton and arrowroot were introduced, tea being afterwards substituted for coffee. The sugar industry soon became of importance, and the planters were compelled to seek for large numbers of labourers. The natives did not volunteer in sufficient numbers, and recourse was had to labour from India. The first Indian labourers reached Natal in 1860. They came as indentured labourers, but at the expiration of their contract were allowed to settle in the colony. The Indian population rapidly increased, the Indians becoming market gardeners, farmers, hawkers, and traders. Alone among the South Africa states, Natal offered a welcome to Indians.

As early as 1893, when Mohandas K. Gandhi arrived in Durban, Indians made up almost half of the non-African population, and by 1904 Indians outnumbered whites in Natal. In 1894, Gandhi helped to establish the Natal Indian Congress to fight discrimination against Indians.

== Demographics ==
=== 1904 Census ===
Population figures for the 1904 Census:

Population group	Number	Percent (%)
Black	904,041	81.53
Asian	100,918	9.10
White	97,109	8.75
Coloured	6,686	0.60
Total	1,108,754	100.00
