= 1887 in South Africa =

- Decades: 1860s; 1870s; 1880s; 1890s; 1900s
- See also: List of years in South Africa

The following events happened in South Africa during the year 1887.

== Incumbents ==
- Governor of the Cape of Good Hope and High Commissioner for Southern Africa: Hercules Robinson.
- Governor of the Colony of Natal: Henry Ernest Gascoyne Bulwer.
- State President of the Orange Free State: Jan Brand.
- State President of the South African Republic: Paul Kruger.
- Prime Minister of the Cape of Good Hope: John Gordon Sprigg.

== Events ==
June

- 21 – The Nederlandsche-Zuid-Afrikaansche Spoorweg-Maatschappij (NZASM) is floated.
- 21 – Zululand becomes a British colony.

Unknown date

- The town of Boksburg is laid out to serve the surrounding gold mines.
- The Stellenbosch Gymnasium, later to become the Stellenbosch University, changes its name to Victoria College, after Queen Victoria.

== Deaths ==
- 29 May – Xhosa chief Sandile is killed in Denge Forest in a skirmish with the Fingos under the command of Captain J. Lonsdale.

== Railways ==
=== New lines ===
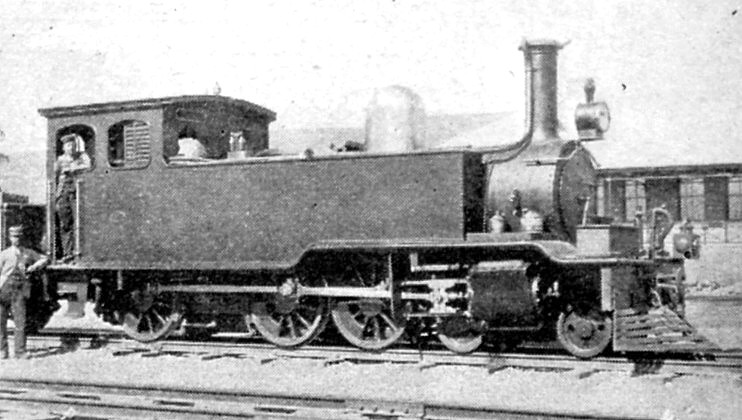
Lourenco Marques, Delagoa Bay and East Africa Railway 4-6-0T

- Construction begins on the Delagoa Bay-Pretoria line.

=== Railway lines opened ===
- October – Cape Central – Worcester to Roodewal, 42 miles (67.6 kilometres).

=== Locomotives ===
- The Lourenco Marques, Delagoa Bay and East Africa Railway in Mozambique places two 4-6-0 tank locomotives in service, one of which will become the Portuguese Tank on the Pretoria-Pietersburg Railway in 1897.
