= 1879 in South Africa =

- Decades: 1850s; 1860s; 1870s; 1880s; 1890s
- See also: List of years in South Africa

The following lists events that happened during 1879 in South Africa.

== Incumbents ==
- Governor of the Cape of Good Hope and High Commissioner for Southern Africa: Henry Barkly.
- Lieutenant-governor of the Colony of Natal: Henry Ernest Gascoyne Bulwer.
- State President of the Orange Free State: Jan Brand.
- State President of the South African Republic: vacant.
- Lieutenant-Governor of Griqualand West: William Owen Lanyon (until March), James Rose Innes (starting March).
- Prime Minister of the Cape of Good Hope: John Charles Molteno (until February), John Gordon Sprigg (starting February).

== Events ==
January

- 11 – Britain declares war against the Zulus and launches the Anglo-Zulu War after an ultimatum issued on 11 December 1878 is rejected.
- 22 – The Zulus wipe out British forces in the Battle of Isandlwana.
- 22-23 – The British prevail against a Zulu attack in the Battle of Rorke's Drift.

March

- 7 – The first British troops arrive in Durban from all over the Empire.
- 12 – A force of 2,000 Zulus attacks a British camp at Ntombi River. Of the 60 men in the camp, only 15 escape.

July

- 4 – The Zulus are defeated at Ulundi and the war ends.

August

- 28 – The Zulu King Cetshwayo is captured.

== Deaths ==
- 4 May – William Froude, engineer, hydrodynamicist and naval architect, dies in Simon's Town
- 1 June – Napoléon Eugène, Prince Imperial is killed in action when ambushed by Zulus during the Anglo-Zulu War.

== Railways ==
=== Railway lines opened ===
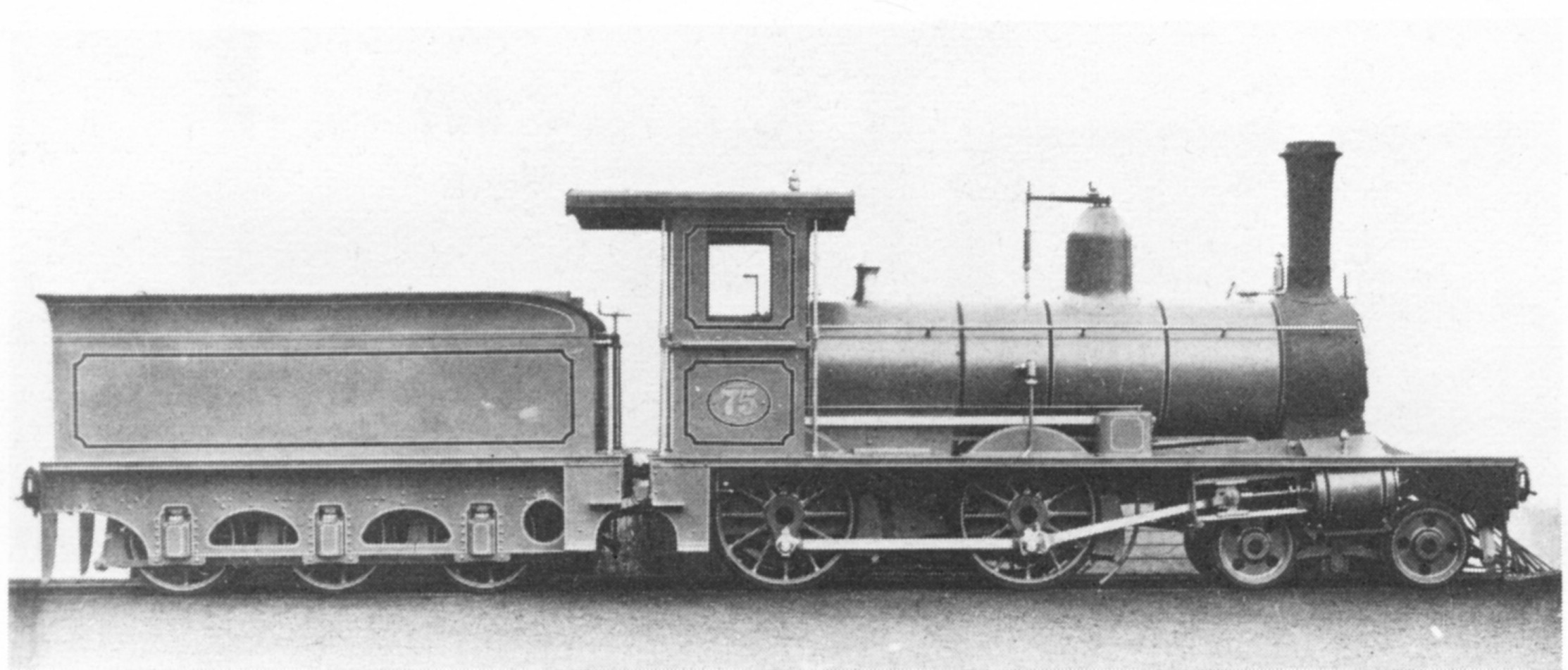
CGR 1st Class 4-4-0

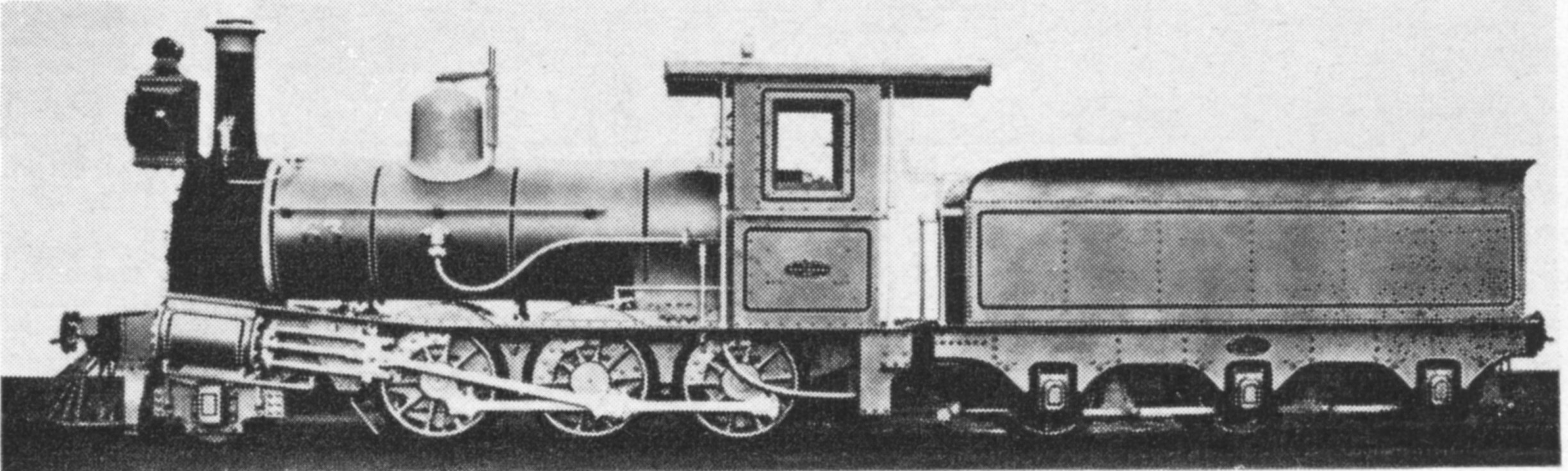
CGR 1st Class 2-6-0

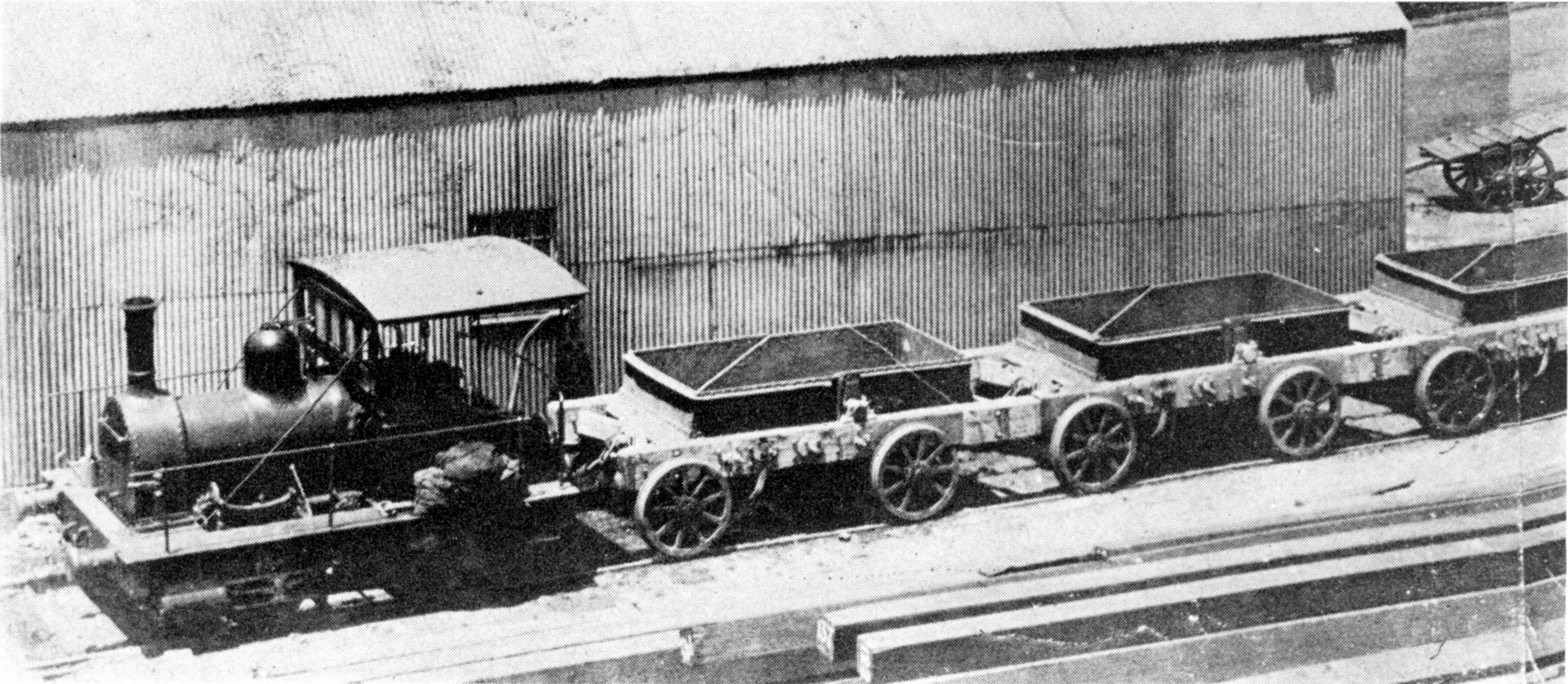
Table Bay Harbour 0-4-0WT

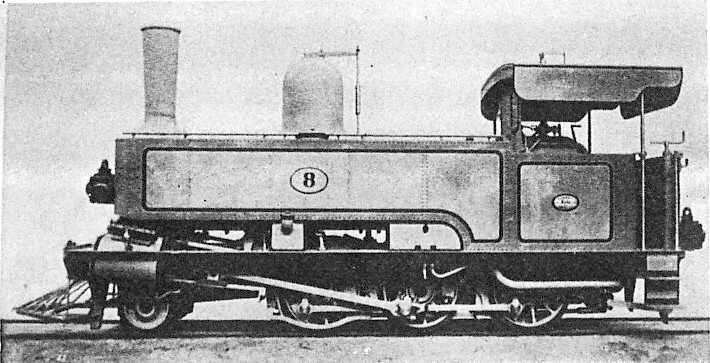
NGR Kitson 2-6-0T

- March – Natal – Pinetown to Botha's Hill, 14 miles 6 chains (22.7 kilometres).
- 11 August – Cape Western – Grootfontein to Fraserburg Road, 52 miles 41 chains (84.5 kilometres).
- 26 August – Cape Midland – Mount Stewart to Graaff-Reinet, 72 miles 18 chains (116.2 kilometres).
- 1 September – Natal – Avoca to Verulam, 12 miles 2 chains (19.4 kilometres).
- 3 September – Cape Midland – Alicedale to Grahamstown, 34 miles 71 chains (56.1 kilometres).
- 17 September – Cape Midland – Alicedale to Middleton, 38 miles 3 chains (61.2 kilometres).
- 3 November – Cape Eastern – Döhne to Cathcart, 42 miles 48 chains (68.6 kilometres).

=== Locomotives ===
Cape

- Two new 3 ft 6 in (1,067 mm) Cape gauge locomotive types enter service on the Cape Government Railways (CGR):
  - The first four of fifteen 1st Class 4-4-0 American type passenger locomotives on the Western and Eastern systems.
  - The first six of ten 1st Class 2-6-0 Mogul type goods locomotives on the Western system.
- The Table Bay Harbour Board places its fourth 7 ft 1/4 in (2,140 mm) Brunel gauge 0-4-0 well-tank engine in excavation and breakwater construction service.

Natal

- The Natal Government Railways places seven 2-6-0T locomotives in service, later to be modified to a 4-6-0T wheel arrangement and designated Class G.
- The Natal Harbours Department in Durban places a single 0-6-0 saddle-tank locomotive in service, named John Milne.
