= 1883 in South Africa =

- Decades: 1860s; 1870s; 1880s; 1890s; 1900s
- See also: List of years in South Africa

The following lists events that happened during 1883 in South Africa.

== Incumbents ==
- Governor of the Cape of Good Hope and High Commissioner for Southern Africa: Hercules Robinson.
- Governor of the Colony of Natal: Henry Ernest Gascoyne Bulwer.
- State President of the Orange Free State: Jan Brand.
- State President of the South African Republic: Triumviate of Paul Kruger, Marthinus Wessel Pretorius and Piet Joubert (until 9 May), Paul Kruger (starting 9 May).
- Prime Minister of the Cape of Good Hope: Thomas Charles Scanlen.

== Events ==
April

- 16 – Paul Kruger is re-elected president of the Zuid-Afrikaansche Republiek.

May

- 9 – Paul Kruger is sworn in as president of the Zuid-Afrikaansche Republiek.

July

- 22 – Zulu King Cetshwayo barely escapes with his life in a rebel attack.

August

- 6 – The United States of Stellaland is established when the Republics of Stellaland and Goshen unite.
- 12 – The last Quagga in the world dies in captivity at the Artis Magistra zoo in Amsterdam, making the species extinct.

== Births ==
- February – Z. D. Mangoaela, Basotho folklorist and writer (d. 1963)
- 6 August – Constance Georgina Adams, botanist (d. 1968)

== Deaths ==
- 9 August – Robert Moffat, Scottish Congregationalist missionary. Died in Leigh near Tunbridge Wells, England.

== Railways ==
=== Railway lines opened ===
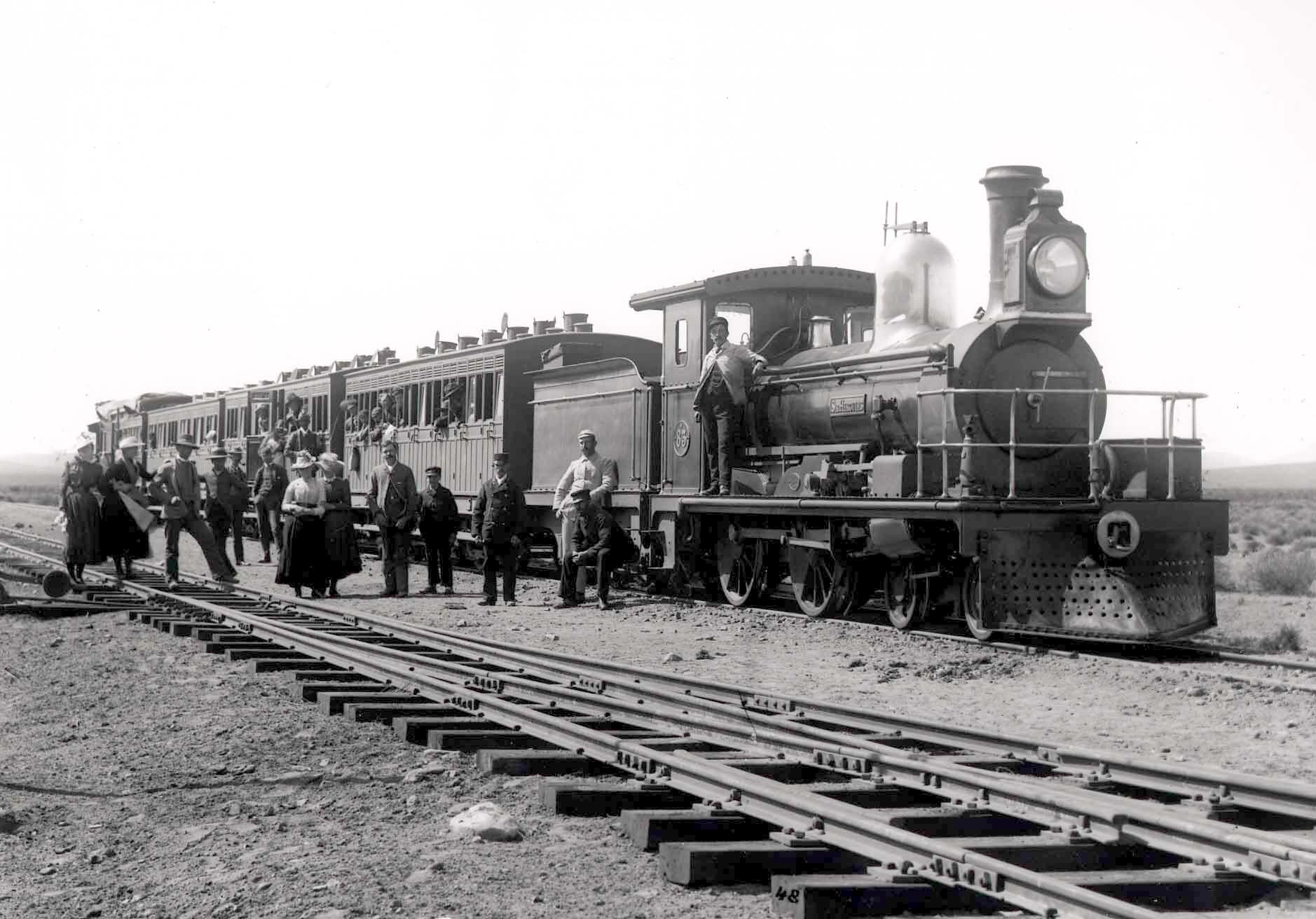
CGR 3rd Class 4-4-0

- 5 May – Cape Western – Muizenberg to Kalkbaai, 1 mile 45 chains (2.5 kilometres).
- 14 May – Cape Western – Beaufort West to Victoria West Road, 80 miles 41 chains (129.6 kilometres).
- 15 October – Cape Eastern – Queenstown to Sterkstroom, 35 miles 28 chains (56.9 kilometres).
- 16 October – Cape Midland – Cradock to Colesberg, 126 miles 19 chains (203.2 kilometres).

=== Locomotives ===
- Eighteen 3rd Class 4-4-0 tender passenger locomotives are delivered to the Cape Government Railways from Neilson and Company and placed in passenger service out of Cape Town, East London and Port Elizabeth respectively.
