= 1885 in South Africa =

- Decades: 1860s; 1870s; 1880s; 1890s; 1900s
- See also: List of years in South Africa

The following lists events that happened during 1885 in South Africa.

== Incumbents ==
- Governor of the Cape of Good Hope and High Commissioner for Southern Africa: Hercules Robinson.
- Governor of the Colony of Natal: Henry Ernest Gascoyne Bulwer.
- State President of the Orange Free State: Jan Brand.
- State President of the South African Republic: Paul Kruger.
- Prime Minister of the Cape of Good Hope: Thomas Upington.

== Events ==
February

- 26 – The Berlin Conference ends and the Scramble for Africa begins.

September

- 30 – A British force abolishes the Boer republic of Stellaland and adds it to British Bechuanaland.

November

- 28 – The railway line from Cape Town to Kimberley is completed.

== Births ==
- 31 January – Marthinus Johannes de Jong, landscape painter, is born in Amsterdam, the Netherlands.

== Railways ==
=== Railway lines opened ===
- 2 September – Cape Eastern – Molteno to Aliwal North, 69 miles 35 chains (111.7 kilometres).
- 28 November – Cape Western – Oranjerivier to Kimberley, 76 miles 70 chains (123.7 kilometres).
- 21 December – Natal – Merrivale to Estcourt, 61 miles 50 chains (99.2 kilometres).
