= 1891 in South Africa =

- Decades: 1870s; 1880s; 1890s; 1900s; 1910s
- See also: 1891 in South African sport; List of years in South Africa

The following lists events that happened during 1891 in South Africa.

== Incumbents ==
- Governor of the Cape of Good Hope and High Commissioner for Southern Africa:Henry Brougham Loch.
- Governor of the Colony of Natal: Charles Bullen Hugh Mitchell.
- State President of the Orange Free State: Francis William Reitz.
- State President of the South African Republic: Paul Kruger.
- Prime Minister of the Cape of Good Hope: Cecil John Rhodes.

== Events ==
January

- 12 – Mahatma Gandhi passes the Bar examination in England.

June

- 11 – Britain and Portugal agree on territory in East Africa at the Anglo-Portuguese Convention in Lisbon.

== Railways ==
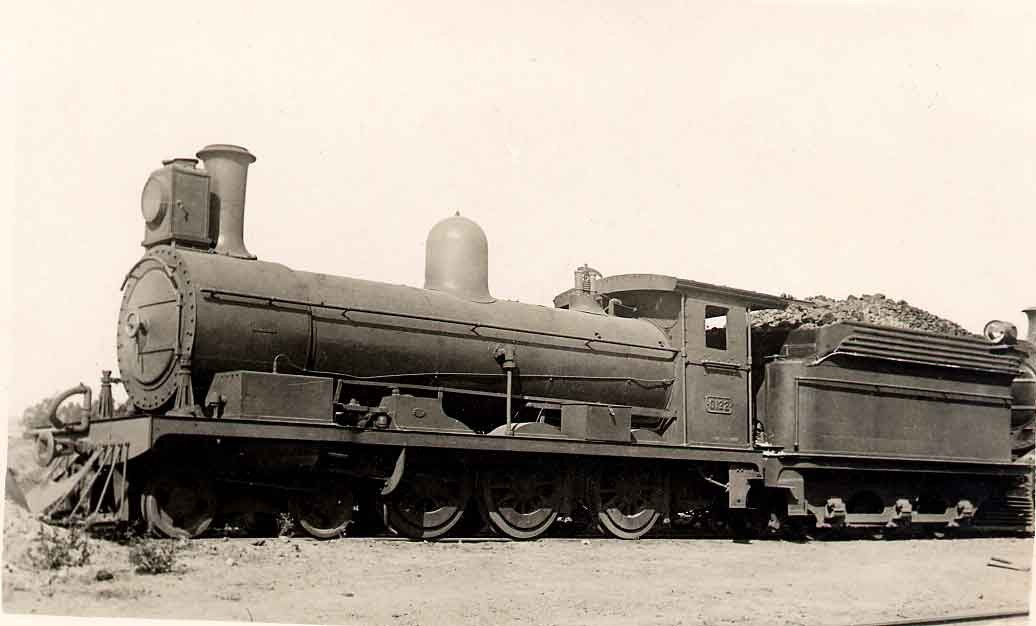
CGR 5th Class 4-6-0

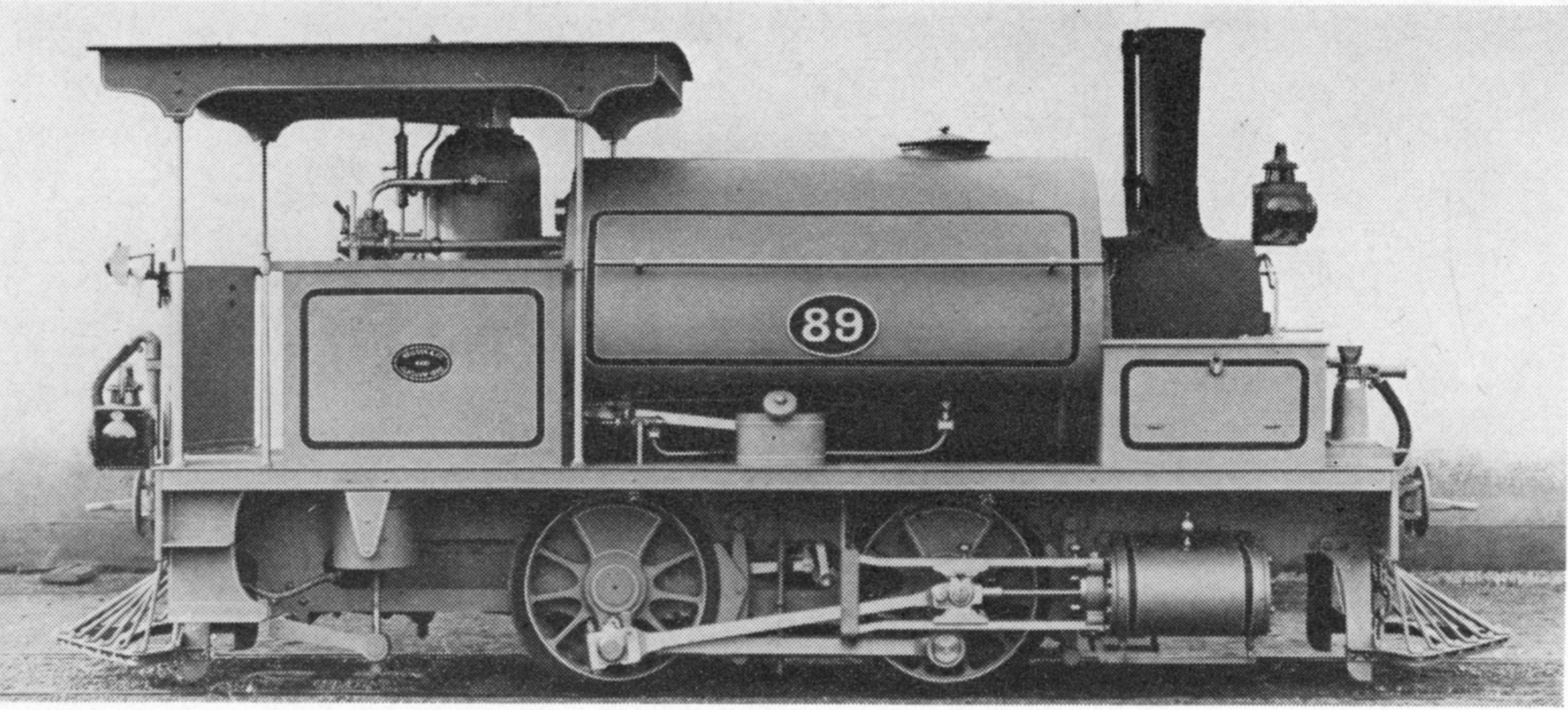
NGR Class K 0-4-0ST

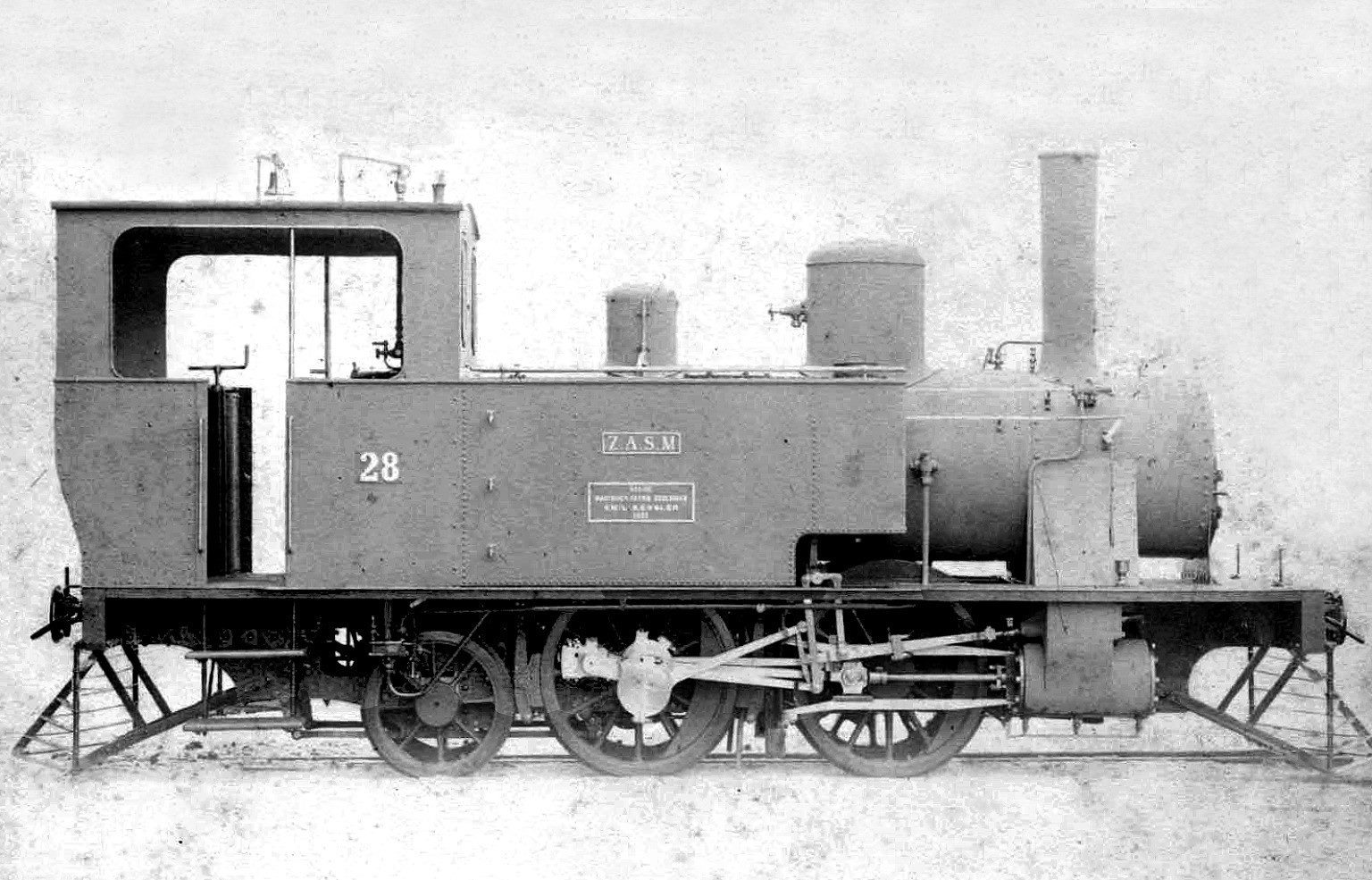
NZASM 19 Tonner 0-4-2T

=== Railway lines opened ===
- 10 February – Transvaal – Roodepoort to Krugersdorp, 8 miles (12.9 kilometres).
- 7 April – Natal – Newcastle to Charlestown, 32 miles 33 chains (52.2 kilometres).
- 28 December – Transvaal – Mozambique border near Komatipoort to Malelane, 33 miles (53.1 kilometres).

=== Locomotives ===
Cape

Two new 3 ft 6 in (1,067 mm) Cape gauge locomotive types enter service on the Cape Government Railways (CGR):

- Two Baldwin-built 1st Class 2-6-0 Mogul type locomotives, the first American locomotives in South Africa.
- Thirty 5th Class 4-6-0 tender locomotives in mainline service on all three Cape Systems.

Natal

- The Natal Government Railways places five Class K 0-4-0 saddle-tank locomotives in service as shunting engines.

Transvaal

- The Nederlandsche-Zuid-Afrikaansche Spoorweg-Maatschappij (NZASM) places the first of twenty-four 19 Tonner 0-4-2 tank steam locomotives in service.

== Sports ==
=== Rugby ===
- The first tour of the British and Irish Lions to South Africa takes place. The touring side presents the Currie Cup to Griqualand West, the province that produces the best performance on the tour.
- 30 July – The Springbok Rugby team plays its first international test match against the Lions team of the British Isles and win by 4–0.
