= Henry Bulwer =

Henry Bulwer may refer to:

- Henry Bulwer, 1st Baron Dalling and Bulwer (1801–1872), British politician, diplomat and writer
- Sir Henry Ernest Gascoyne Bulwer (1836–1914), his nephew, British colonial administrator and diplomat
