= 1881 in South Africa =

- Decades: 1860s; 1870s; 1880s; 1890s; 1900s
- See also: List of years in South Africa

The following lists events that happened during 1881 in South Africa.

== Incumbents ==
- Governor of the Cape of Good Hope and High Commissioner for Southern Africa: John Gordon Sprigg.
- Governor of the Colony of Natal:
  - until 27 February: George Pomeroy Colley.
  - 27 February – 3 April: Henry Evelyn Wood.
  - 3 April – 9 August: Redvers Henry Buller.
  - 9 August – 22 December: vacant.
  - starting 22 December: Charles Bullen Hugh Mitchell.
- State President of the Orange Free State: Jan Brand.
- State President of the South African Republic: Triumviate of Paul Kruger, Marthinus Wessel Pretorius and Piet Joubert.
- Prime Minister of the Cape of Good Hope: John Gordon Sprigg (until 8 May), Thomas Charles Scanlen (starting 8 May).

== Events ==
January

- 28 – The Boers defeat the British in the Battle of Laing's Nek during the First Boer War.

February

- 8 – The Boers defeat the British in the Battle of Schuinshoogte during the First Boer War.
- 27 – The Boers defeat the British in the Battle of Majuba Hill during the First Boer War.

March

- 21 – Peace is declared and Britain recognizes the South African Republic.
- 26 – Reinhold Gregorowski is appointed a judge in the Orange Free State at the age of 25.

May

- The Government of Cape Prime Minister Gordon Sprigg falls due to ruinous war expenses. Scanlen and Molteno form the Scanlen Government and begin moves to secure peace on the frontier and stabilise finances.

August

- 3 – The Pretoria Convention peace treaty is signed, officially ending the war between the Boers and the Britain.

Unknown date

- The Tshwana-Kora wars break out with white mercenary involvement.
- The town of Roburnia is established as the capital of the Republic of New Scotland. It was renamed to Amsterdam in 1882.
- Gold is discovered in the Barberton area.

== Births ==
- 23 April – South African Test cricket player Claude Pagdett Carter is born in Durban.
- 28 May – Daniël Francois Malherbe, novelist, poet and dramatist, is born in Dal Josafat, Cape Colony.
- November – Benjamin Jennings Caddy, a militant trade unionist who is regarded as the doyen of the trade union movement in South Africa, is born in Australia.

== Deaths ==
- 21 April – Jacobus Nicolaas Boshoff, 2nd president of the Orange Free State, dies in Weston, Pietermaritzburg at the age of 73.
- 9 December – Thomas François Burgers, 4th president of the South African Republic, dies at Richmond, Transvaal at the age of 74
- 13 November Chief Stokwe Ndlela of AmaQwathi was killed by British forces for rebellion against magistrates imposed by colonial Government at Ndwana, Stokwe's Basin.

== Railways ==
=== New lines ===
- Construction begins on the Port Alfred-Grahamstown line.

=== Railway lines opened ===
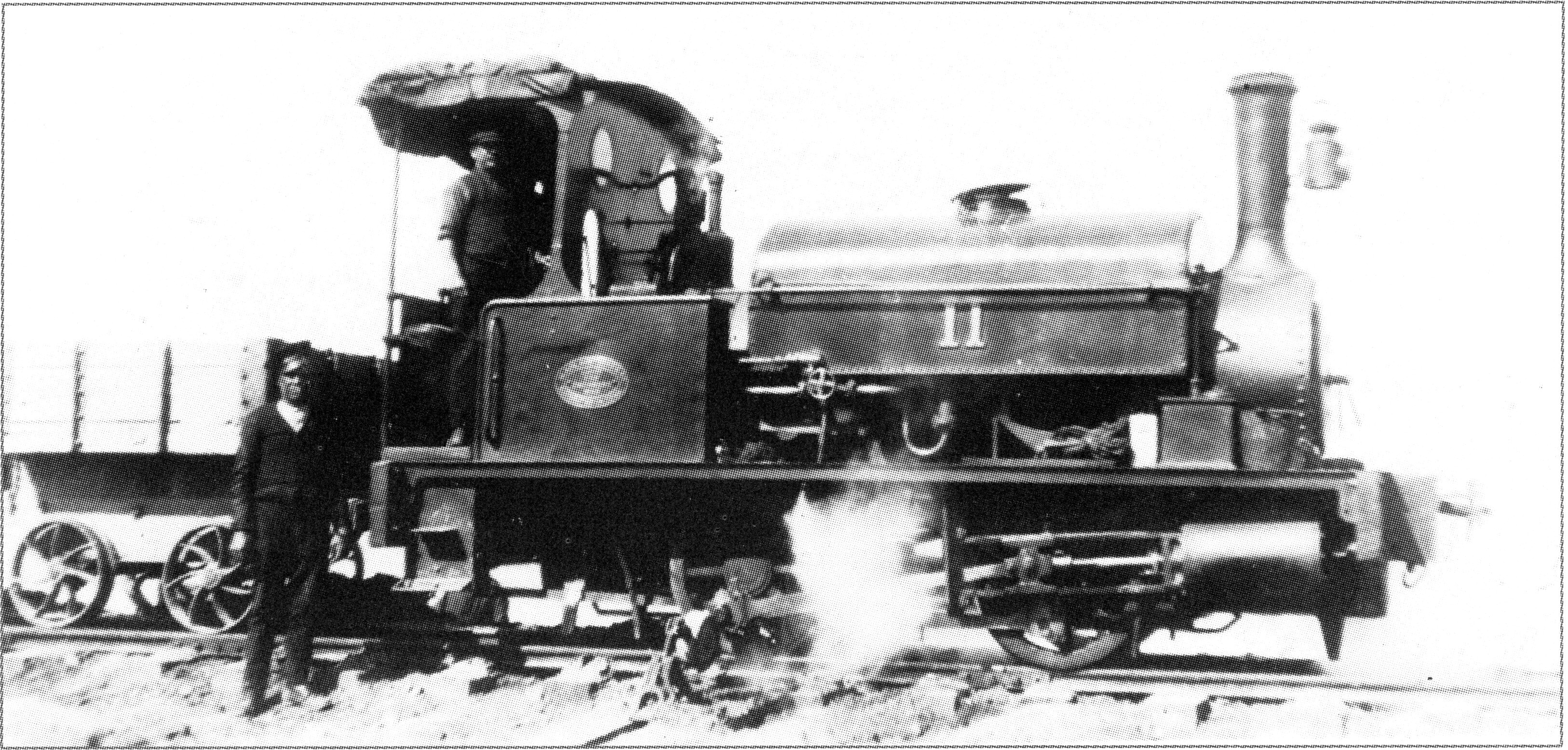
CGR 0-4-0ST dock shunter

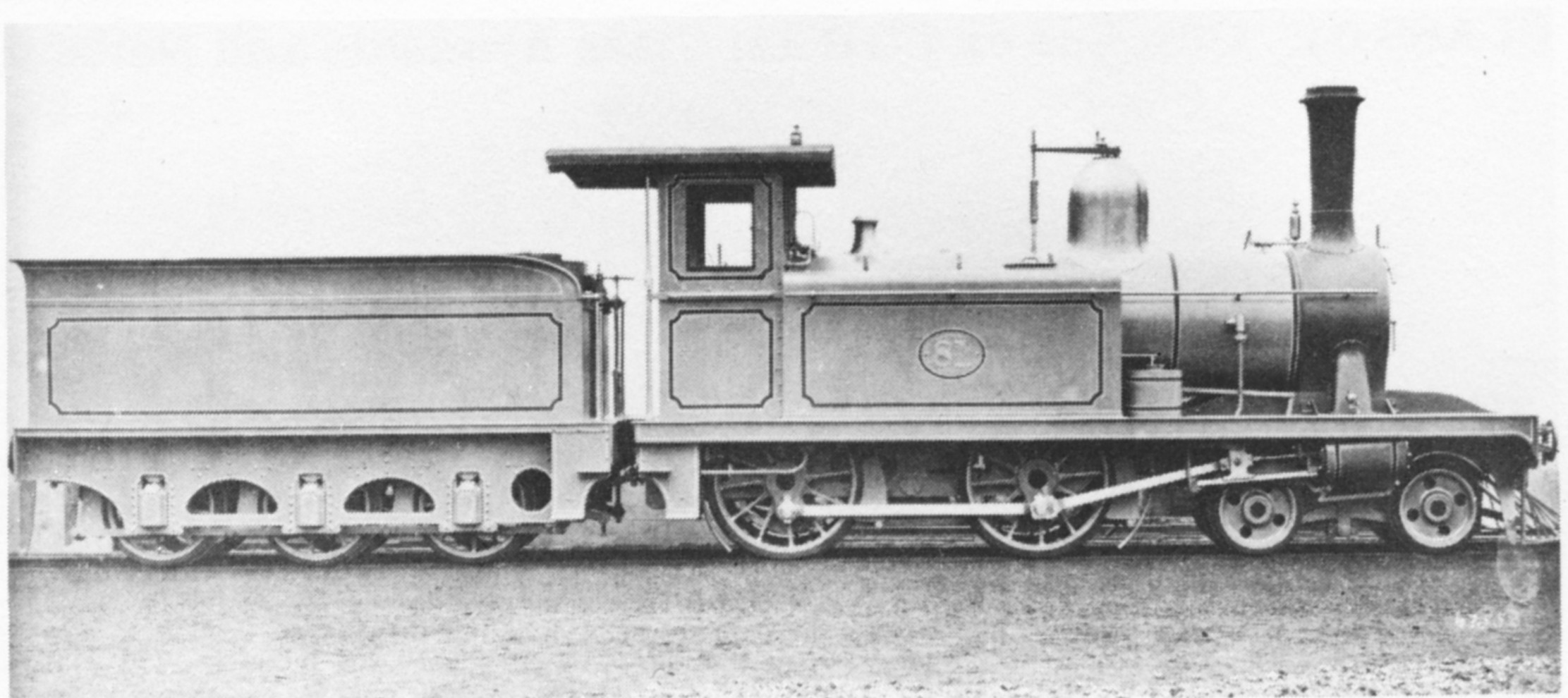
CGR 1st Class 4-4-0TT

- 1 June – Cape Midland – Cookhouse to Cradock, 54 miles 73 chains (88.4 kilometres).

=== Locomotives ===
- The first of thirteen Cape Government Railways (CGR) 0-4-0 saddle-tank locomotives enter dock shunting service at the Table Bay Harbour in Cape Town.
- Two 3 ft 6 in (1,067 mm) Cape gauge 0-4-0 saddle-tank locomotives are placed in service by Teague and Company on Teague's Tramway in Kimberley.
- Six 1st Class 4-4-0 side-tank-and-tender passenger locomotives enter service on the Midland System of the CGR.
- The first two of three Table Bay Harbour Board 0-4-0 saddle-tank locomotives, built to 7 ft 1/4 in (2,140 mm) Brunel gauge, enter breakwater construction service on the Table Bay Harbour improvement project.
