= 1882 in South Africa =

- Decades: 1860s; 1870s; 1880s; 1890s; 1900s
- See also: List of years in South Africa

The following lists events that happened during 1882 in South Africa.

== Incumbents ==
- Governor of the Cape of Good Hope and High Commissioner for Southern Africa: Hercules Robinson.
- Governor of the Colony of Natal: Henry Ernest Gascoyne Bulwer.
- State President of the Orange Free State: Jan Brand.
- State President of the South African Republic: Triumviate of Paul Kruger, Marthinus Wessel Pretorius and Piet Joubert.
- Prime Minister of the Cape of Good Hope: Thomas Charles Scanlen.

== Events ==
May

- 9 – Paul Kruger becomes President of the South African Republic.
- 28 – Two ships, the Agnes (94 tonne) and the Christina (196 tonne), run ashore at Plettenberg Bay.

July

- 26 – The Stellaland Republic is declared, founding Vryburg as capital.

September

- 2 – Kimberley becomes the first town in the Southern Hemisphere to install electric street lighting.
- 7 – W.H. Finlay of Cape Town's Royal Observatory is first to record observations of the Great Comet of 1882.
- 29 – 229 Norwegians settle at the mouth of the Umzimkulu River, founding Port Shepstone.

November

- 21 – The Goshen Republic is established with its capital Rooigrond near Mafeking.

Unknown date

- Zulu king Cetshwayo returns to South Africa.
- In the Cape Colony, the Dutch language is once again admitted as an official language alongside English.

== Births ==
- 24 February – Jan Gysbert Hugo Bosman a.k.a. Bosman di Ravelli, concert pianist and composer, is born in Piketberg.

== Railways ==
=== Railway lines opened ===
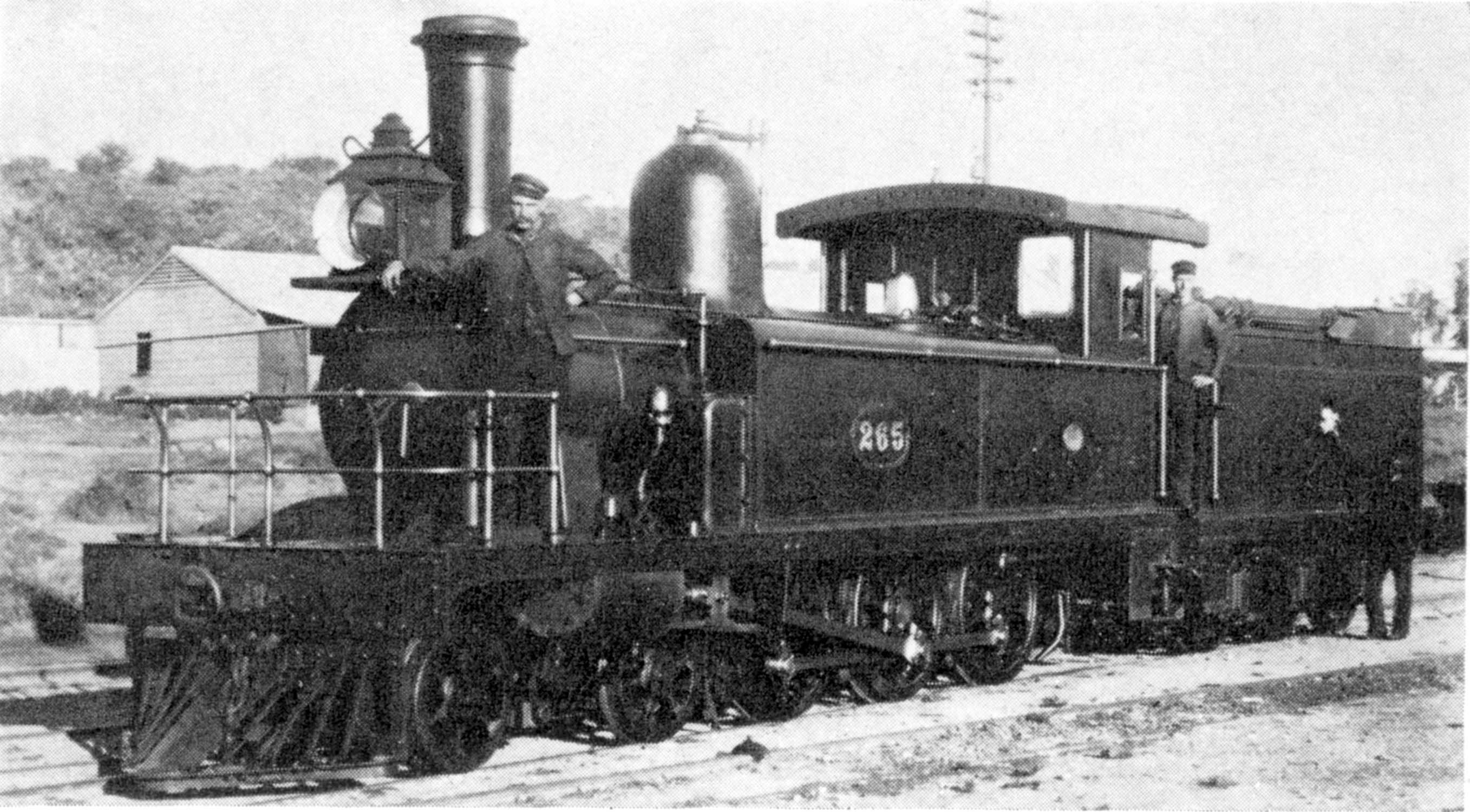
CGR 4th Class 4-6-0TT (Stephenson)

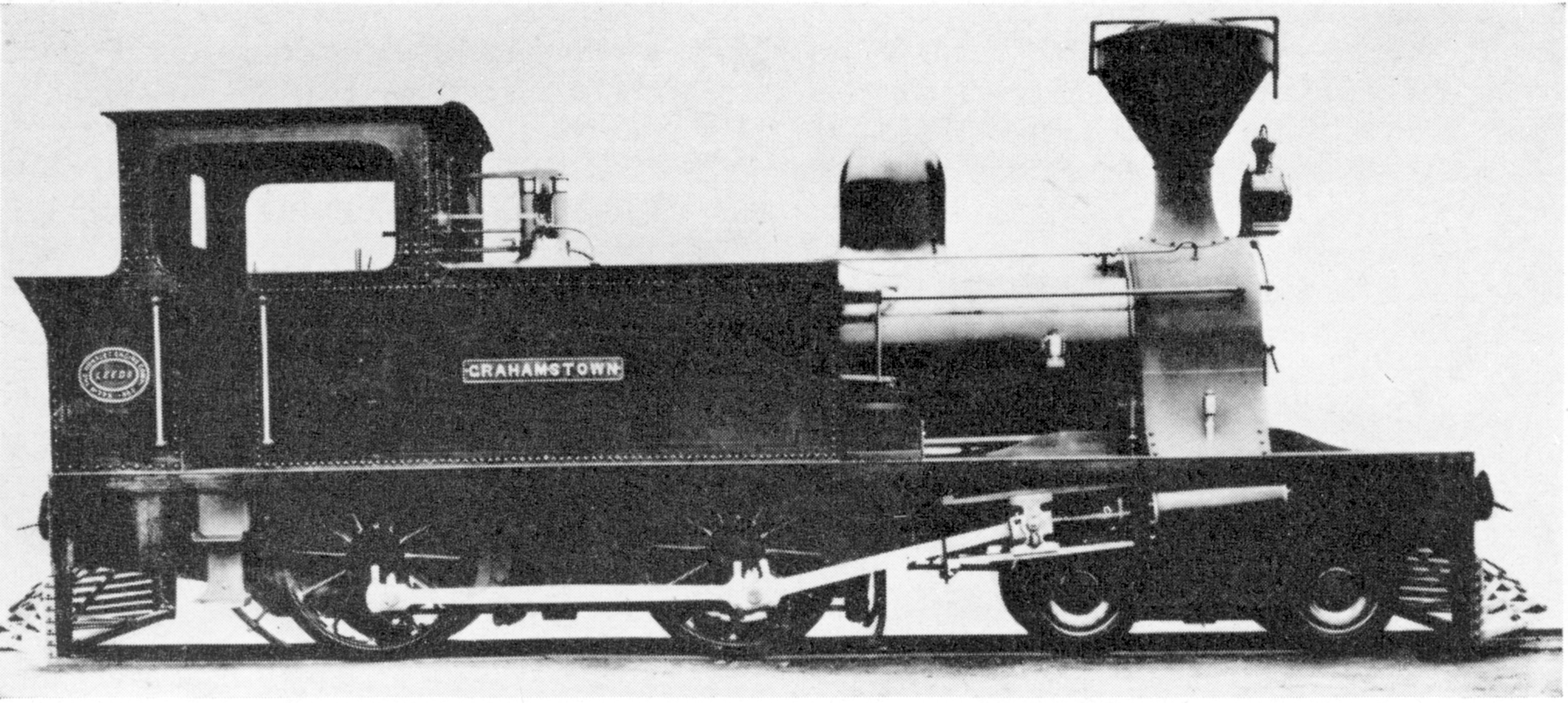
Kowie Railway 4-4-0T

- 15 December – Cape Western – Wynberg to Muizenberg, 7 miles 31 chains (11.9 kilometres).

=== Locomotives ===
- Three new Cape gauge locomotive types enter service on the Cape Government Railways (CGR):
  - Six 2nd Class 4-4-0 Wynberg Tank locomotives on suburban passenger trains out of Cape Town.
  - The first of 33 4th Class 4-6-0 tank-and-tender locomotives with Stephenson valve gear on the mainlines of all three systems.
  - The first of 35 4th Class 4-6-0 tank-and-tender locomotives with Joy valve gear on the mainlines of all three systems.
- Two new 3 ft 6 in (1,067 mm) Cape gauge locomotive types enter service on the private Kowie Railway which is under construction from Port Alfred to Grahamstown:
  - Two 0-6-0 tank locomotives in goods service.
  - Two 4-4-0 tank locomotives in passenger service.
