= 1880 in South Africa =

- Decades: 1860s; 1870s; 1880s; 1890s; 1900s
- See also: List of years in South Africa

The following lists events that happened during 1880 in South Africa.

== Incumbents ==
- Governor of the Cape of Good Hope and High Commissioner for Southern Africa: John Gordon Sprigg.
- Lieutenant-governor of the Colony of Natal: Henry Ernest Gascoyne Bulwer.
- State President of the Orange Free State: Jan Brand.
- State President of the South African Republic: Triumviate of Paul Kruger, Marthinus Wessel Pretorius and Piet Joubert.
- Lieutenant-Governor of Griqualand West: James Rose Innes (until 15 October).
- Prime Minister of the Cape of Good Hope: John Gordon Sprigg.
- Monarch - Queen Alexandrina Victoria

== Events ==
March

- 20 March – £50,000 worth of diamonds are reported stolen from Cape Town's post office.

April

- Paul Kruger and Joubert travel to the Cape to campaign against the federation. Their mission succeeds, but Gladstone refuses self-rule.
- 23 April – Eugénie de Montijo, wife of Emperor Napoleon III of France, arrives in Durban to visit the grave of her son, Napoléon Eugène, Prince Imperial, who was killed in Zululand during the Anglo-Zulu War in 1879.

June

- 15 June – The Natal South Coast railway line from Durban is opened to traffic to Isipingo.

August

- British Governor Bartle Frere is recalled to London to face charges of misconduct.

September

- Cape Prime Minister Gordon Sprigg's attempt at disarming the Basotho ignites the Basuto Gun War.

October

- 18 October – Griqualand West is annexed to the Cape Colony.

December

- The Volksraad meet at Paardekraal, as Kruger, Joubert, and Pretorius form the new republic's government. Kruger-based in Heidelberg, armed forces take positions on the Natal border and around the British garrison in the Transvaal. Kruger seeks negotiations, knowing that the British forces are stronger.
- 16 December – Britain declares war against the South African Republic and starts the first Boer War.

Unknown date

- Britain forms the first Legislative Council in the Transvaal.
- The Afrikander Bond is established.
- The Transvaal declares itself the South African Republic again.
- The John N Gamewell, a small American brigantine, sinks off the west coast of the Cape Colony near Port Elizabeth.
- The Muizenberg Flyer, a faster suburban passenger train service, is introduced in Cape Town.
- First keeper of the Colonial Archives of the Cape Colony is appointed.
- Fietas, Johannesburg is known as the 'Malay Location'. Its population is mainly 'coloured', 'Cape coloured', and Malay.

== Births ==
- Cecilia Makiwane, first black woman to become a professional nurse in South Africa.
- 23 December - John Hewitt, zoologist and archaeologist (d. 1961)

== Railways ==
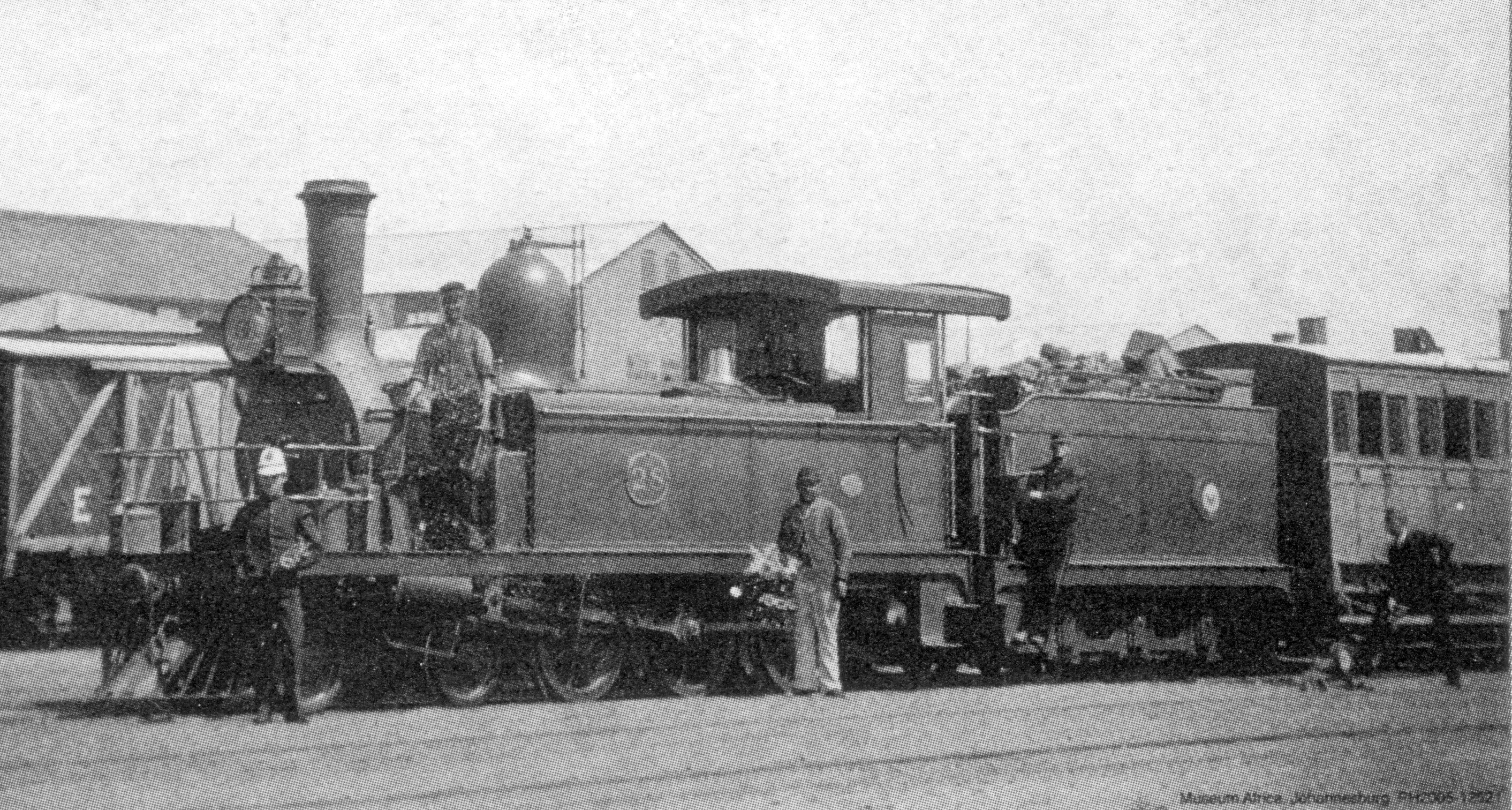
CGR 4th Class 4-6-0TT

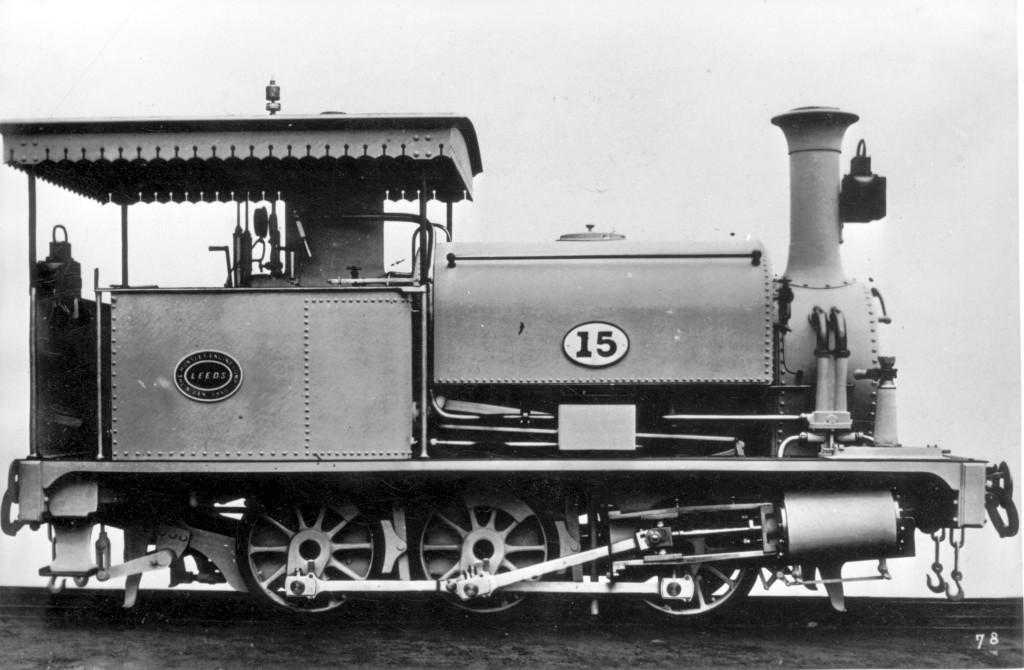
NGR Class K 0-6-0ST

=== Railway lines opened ===
- 1 February – Natal – Rossburgh to Isipingo, 6 miles 27 chains (10.2 kilometres).
- 5 February – Cape Western – Fraserburg Road to Beaufort West, 48 miles 45 chains (78.2 kilometres).
- 2 March – Cape Midland – Middleton to Cookhouse, 17 miles (27.4 kilometres).
- 5 May – Cape Eastern – Cathcart to Queenstown, 45 miles 2 chains (72.5 kilometres).
- 1 December – Natal – Botha's Hill to Pietermaritzburg, 41 miles 9 chains (66.2 kilometres).

=== Locomotives ===
- The Cape Government Railways places the first nine of eighteen 4th Class 4-6-0 tank-and-tender locomotives in mainline service on its Midland System working out of Port Elizabeth and Eastern System working out of East London.
- The Natal Government Railways places a Class K 0-6-0 saddle-tank locomotive in service.
