= 1884 in South Africa =

- Decades: 1860s; 1870s; 1880s; 1890s; 1900s
- See also: List of years in South Africa

The following lists events that happened during 1884 in South Africa.

== Incumbents ==
- Governor of the Cape of Good Hope and High Commissioner for Southern Africa: Hercules Robinson.
- Governor of the Colony of Natal: Henry Ernest Gascoyne Bulwer.
- State President of the Orange Free State: Jan Brand.
- State President of the South African Republic: Paul Kruger.
- Prime Minister of the Cape of Good Hope: Thomas Charles Scanlen (until 12 May), Thomas Upington (starting 12 May).

== Events ==
April

- 24 – Germany occupies German South-West Africa.

July

- 24 – Barberton is declared a town.

August

- 5 – The Republic of Vryheid is established in northern Natal.
- 7 – Walvisbaai is occupied by the Cape Colony.

November

- 3 – Imvo Zabantsundu (Xhosa: The Native People's Opinion of South Africa), South Africa's first newspaper by and for Black people, is founded by John Tengo Jabavu in King William's Town.
- 15 – The Berlin Conference commences when 14 countries (Austria-Hungary, Belgium, Denmark, France, Germany, Great Britain, Italy, Netherlands, Portugal, Russia, Spain, Sweden-Norway, Turkey, and United States of America) meet in Berlin to each claim their part of Africa.

December

- 1 – The private Kowie Railway line between Grahamstown and Port Alfred is opened to traffic.

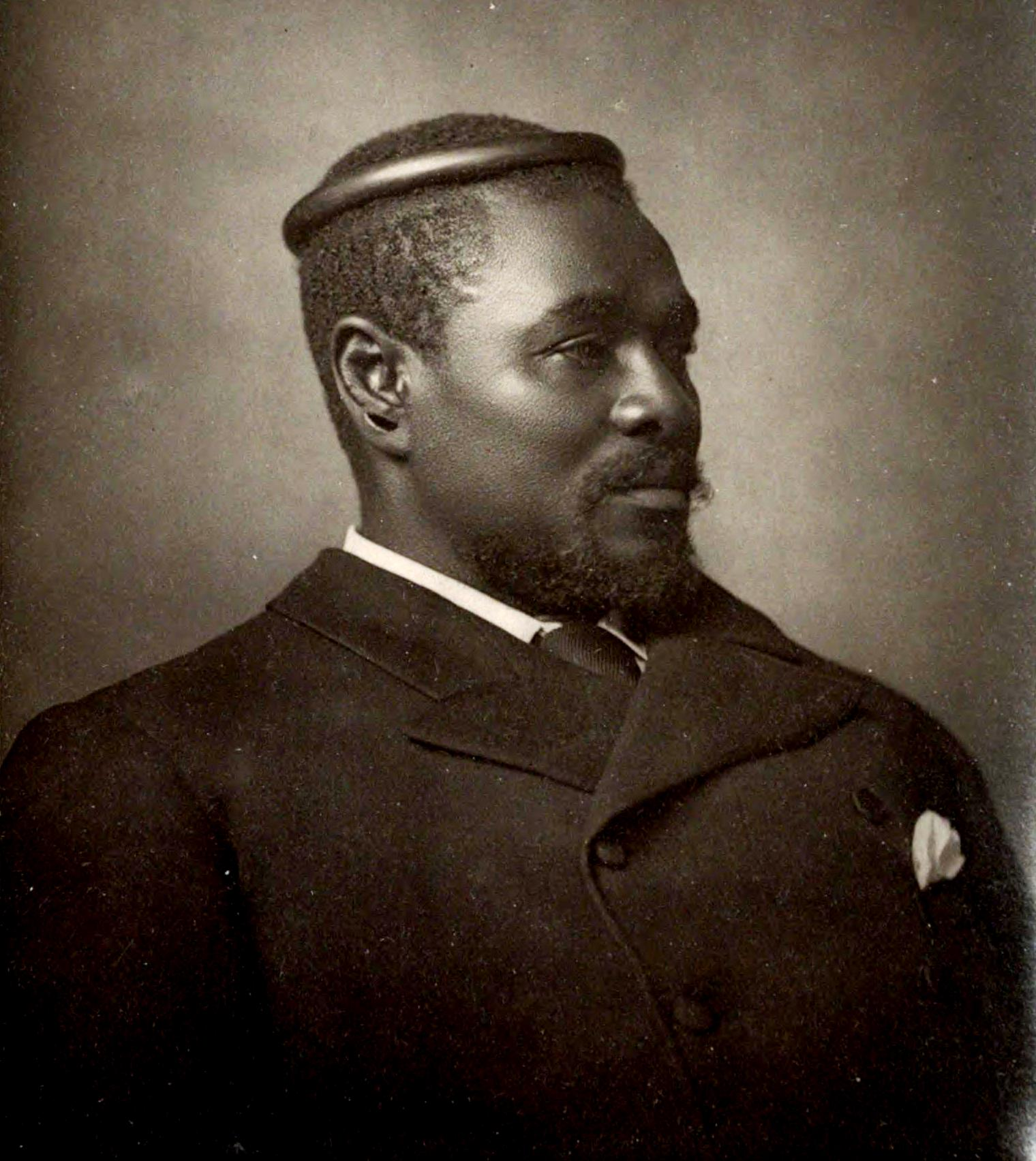
King Cetshwayo kaMpande

== Births ==
Rolland Beaumont cricketer

== Deaths ==
- 8 February – Zulu king Cetshwayo. (b. 1826)

== Railways ==
=== Railway lines opened ===
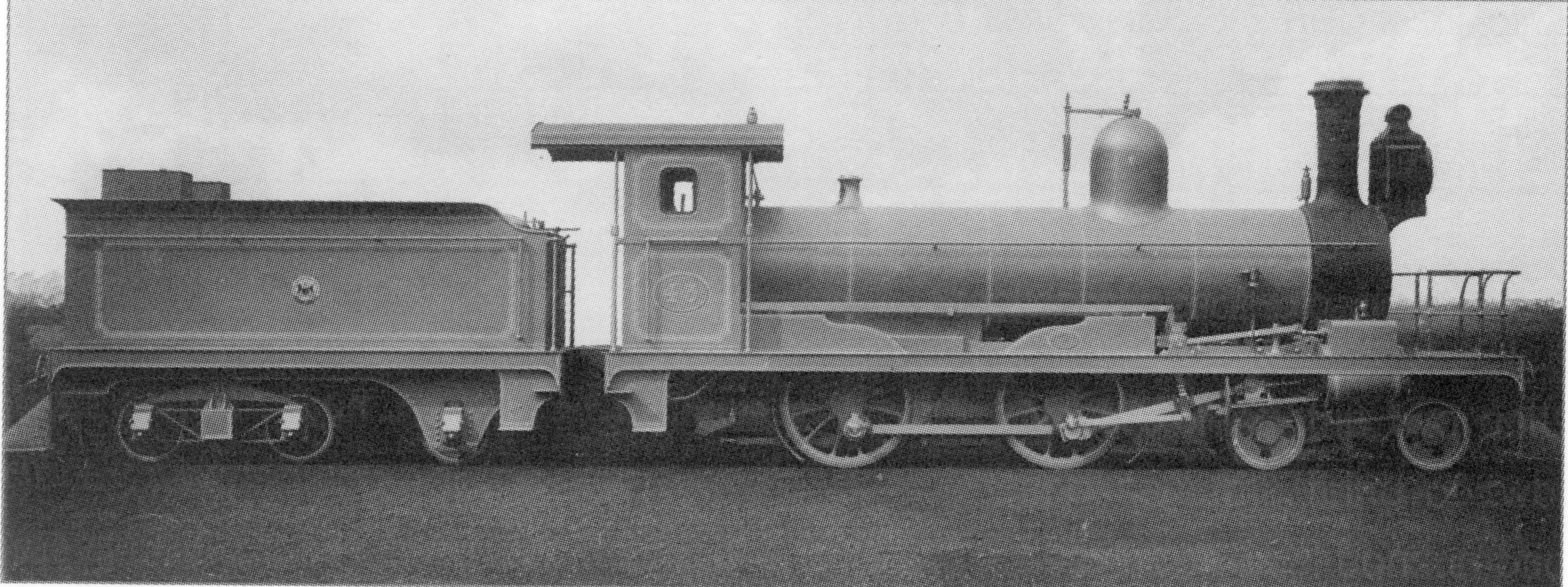
CGR 3rd Class 4-4-0

- 31 March – Cape Midland – Noupoort to De Aar, to link up with the Cape Western System, 69 miles 6 chains (111.2 kilometres).
- May – Natal – Pietermaritzburg to Merrivale, 15 miles 19 chains (24.5 kilometres).
- 16 September – Cape Eastern – Sterkstroom to Molteno, 20 miles 69 chains (33.6 kilometres).
- 3 November – Cape Western – Victoria West Road to Oranjerivier, 150 miles 69 chains (242.8 kilometres).
- 1 December – Kowie – Port Alfred to Grahamstown, 44 miles (70.8 kilometres).

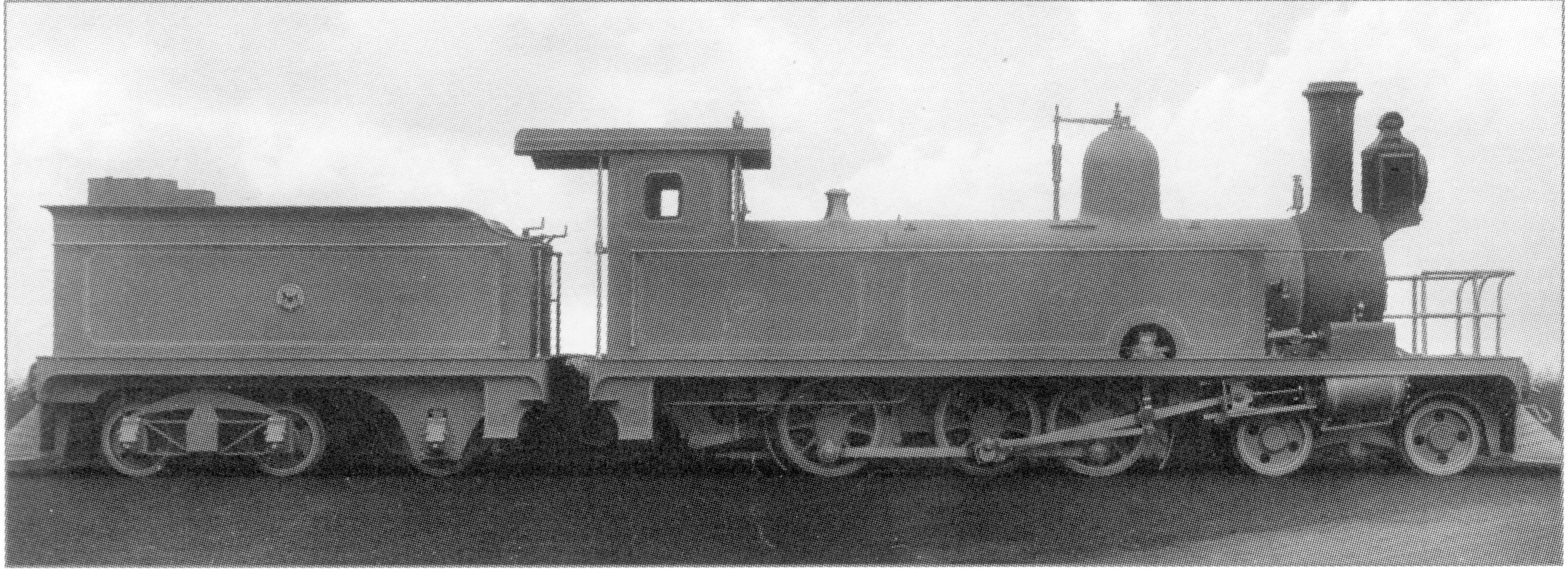
CGR 4th Class 4-6-0TT

=== Locomotives ===
- The Cape Government Railways places two experimental 3rd Class 4-4-0 tender and four experimental 4th Class 4-6-0 tank-and-tender locomotives in service, designed by the Cape Eastern System to be able to use the low-grade local coal with its high content of incombustible matter.
