= 1886 in South Africa =

- Decades: 1860s; 1870s; 1880s; 1890s; 1900s
- See also: List of years in South Africa

The following lists events that happened during 1886 in South Africa.

== Incumbents ==
- Governor of the Cape of Good Hope and High Commissioner for Southern Africa: Hercules Robinson.
- Governor of the Colony of Natal: Henry Ernest Gascoyne Bulwer.
- State President of the Orange Free State: Jan Brand.
- State President of the South African Republic: Paul Kruger.
- Prime Minister of the Cape of Good Hope: Thomas Upington (until 24 November), John Gordon Sprigg (starting 24 November).

== Events ==
September

- The main gold reef on the Witwatersrand is discovered, giving birth to Ferreira's Camp, later to be named Johannesburg.

October

- 11 – The Standard Bank of South Africa opens the first bank in Ferreira's Camp.

== Births ==
- 2 January – Billy Zulch, South African cricketer (d. 1924)
- 13 December – Henry Selby Msimang, political activist, journalist, court interpreter and lay preacher, is born in Edendale, Pietermaritzburg.

== Deaths ==
- 1 September – Sir John Charles Molteno, first Prime Minister of the Cape Colony.

== Railways ==
=== Railway lines opened ===
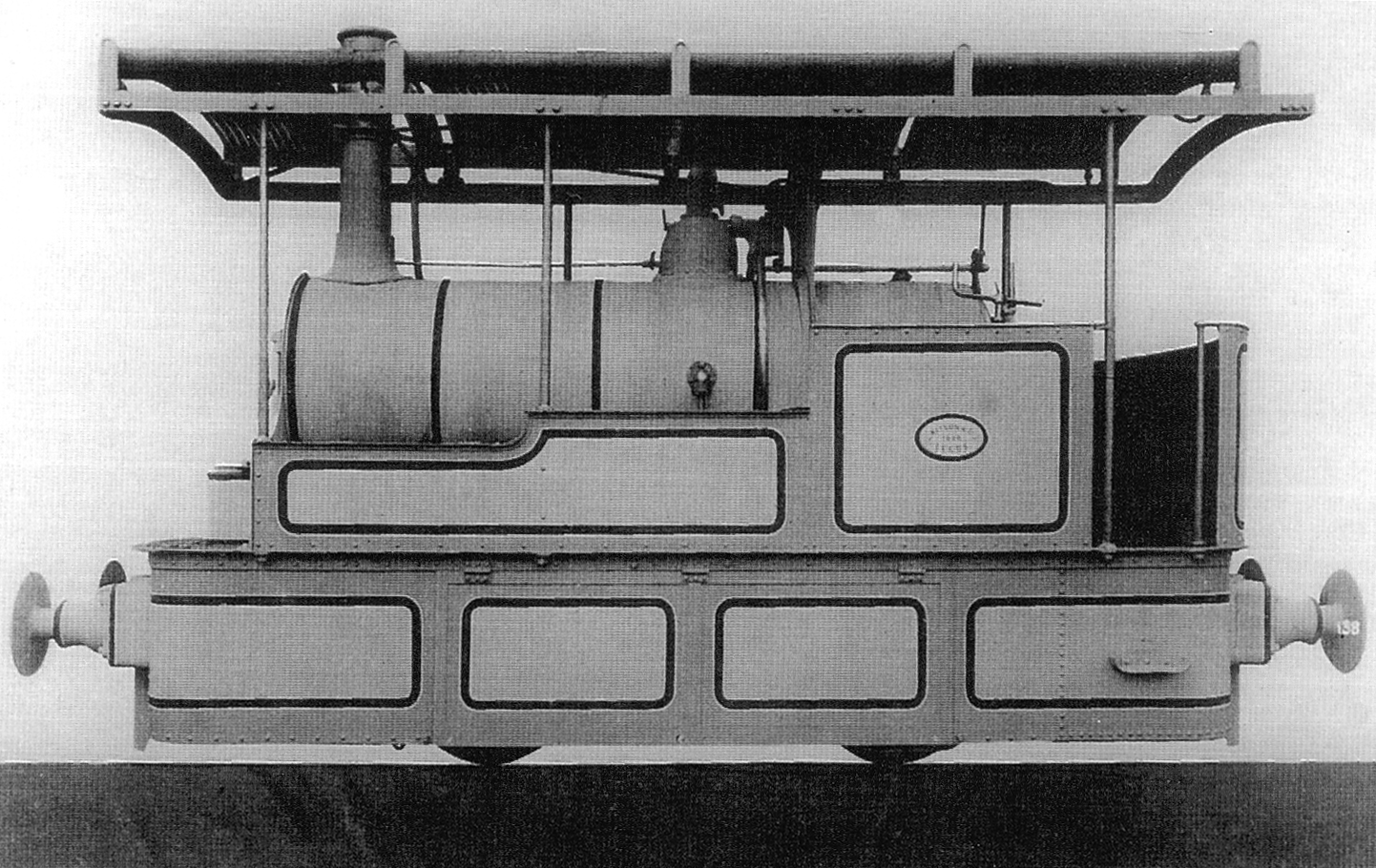
Namaqualand 0-4-0WT Condenser

- 21 June – Natal – Estcourt to Ladysmith, 45 miles 21 chains (72.8 kilometres).

=== Locomotives ===
- The first of three 0-4-0 well-tank condensing locomotives is placed in service by the Cape Copper Mining Company on its 2 ft 6 in (762 mm) narrow gauge Namaqualand Railway between Port Nolloth and O'okiep in the Cape Colony. They are the first condensing steam locomotives in South Africa.
