= Table Bay Harbour 0-4-0T =

South African steam locomotive

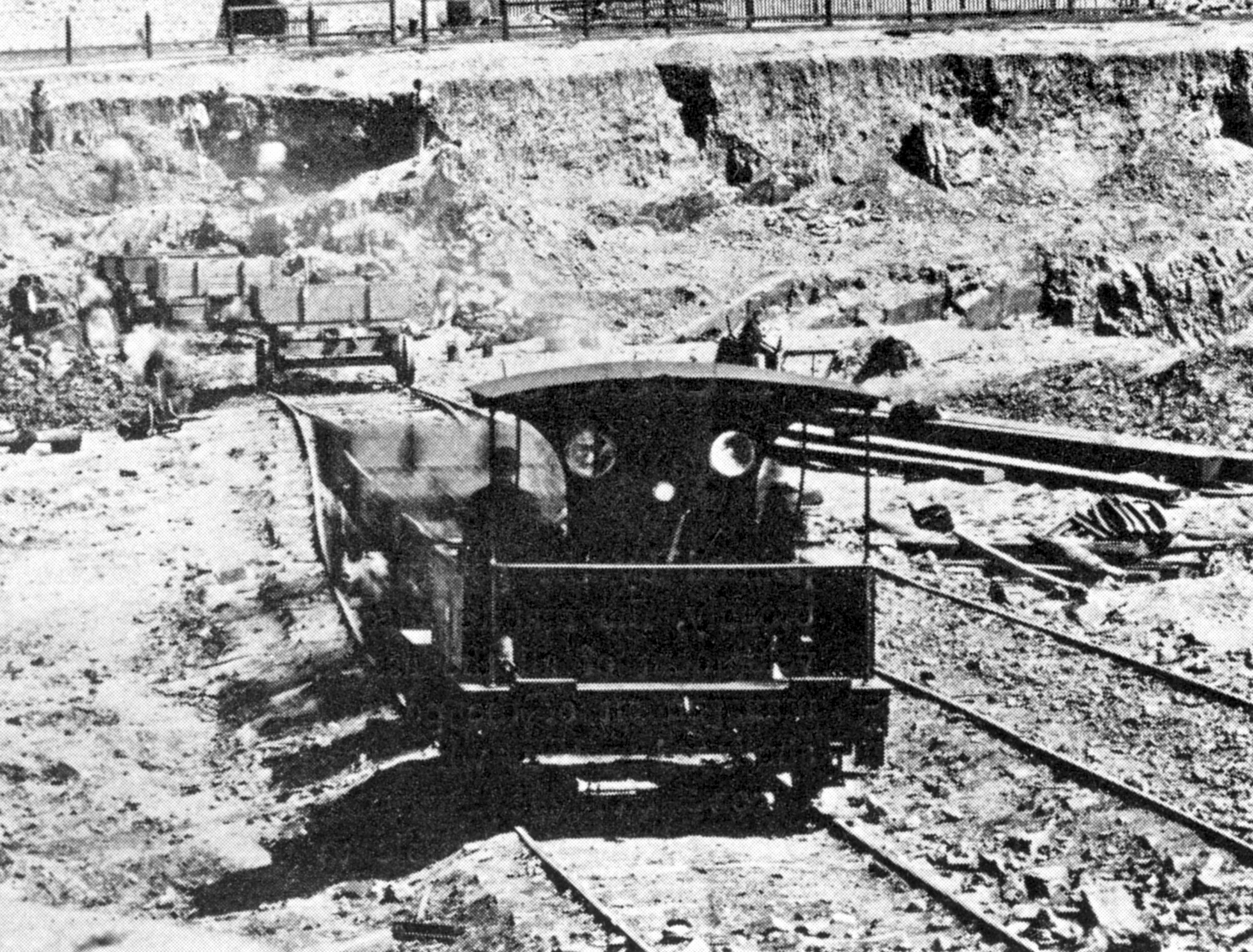
- Table Bay Harbour's Brunel gauge 0-4-0T construction locomotive of 1874
Type and origin
- Power type: Steam
- Designer: Fletcher, Jennings & Co.
- Builder: Fletcher, Jennings & Co.
- Serial number: 128
- Build date: 1874
Specifications
- Configuration
  - Whyte: 0-4-0T
  - UIC: Bn2t
- Driver: 2nd coupled axle
- Gauge: 7 ft 1/4 in (2,140 mm) Brunel
- Coupled dia.: 33 in (838 mm)
- Fuel type: Coal
- Firebox
  - Type: Round-top
- Cylinders: Two
- Cylinder size: 9 in (229 mm) bore 16 in (406 mm) stroke
- Couplers: Buffers-and-chain
Career
- Operators: Table Bay Harbour Board
- Number in class: 1
- Delivered: 1874
- First run: 1874
- Withdrawn: 1904

The Table Bay Harbour 0-4-0T of 1874 was a South African steam locomotive from the pre-Union era in the Cape of Good Hope.

In 1847, the government of the Cape of Good Hope established harbour boards at its three major ports, Table Bay, Port Elizabeth and East London. While railway lines were laid at all these harbours, trains were for the most part initially hauled by oxen or mules.

Altogether seven 7 ft 1/4 in (2,140 mm) Brunel gauge locomotives are known to have been employed on the Table Bay Harbour project between 1862 and 1904. The first steam locomotive to see service at any of these harbours was a Brunel gauge engine which was placed in service on breakwater construction at Table Bay Harbour in 1862. The third Table Bay harbour construction locomotive was this 0-4-0T engine which entered service in 1874.

== The harbour boards ==
When the need for improved harbour facilities for the handling of ships and cargoes became apparent, the Cape Government established harbour boards at Table Bay, Port Elizabeth and East London in 1847. Each board initially consisted of five members, later increased to seven. They were responsible for the management, control, improvement, development and maintenance of the facilities at these ports, and empowered to levy wharfage dues.

== Table Bay Harbour ==
While Table Bay itself was a poor natural harbour, badly exposed to the Cape's notorious gale force Southeasters and Northwesters, it was preferred by early seafarers over the more suitable Saldanha Bay to the north and Simon's Town in False Bay because of the lack of fresh water at the latter two. Cape Town was founded around the harbour.

As Cape Town expanded, so did ship's traffic in Table Bay Harbour, but the inadequacy of its facilities often resulted in considerable delays and frequently also in loss of life and cargoes. The urgent necessity of harbour improvements finally began to be recognised upon the arrival of the first steam ship, the Enterprise, in Table Bay in October 1825.

== Harbour construction railway ==
As at the Port Elizabeth and East London harbours, railway lines were an early feature at Table Bay Harbour. Work to improve the facilities at the harbour was started in 1860, using convict labour, and consisted of the excavation of two basins and the construction of breakwater piers. The first truckload of construction rocks to start the building of the breakwater was tipped on 17 September 1860 by Prince Alfred, the sixteen-year-old son of Queen Victoria. The Alfred Basin, named after the prince, was completed in 1870.

A number of heavy iron railway tip-wagons were acquired to convey the rock to create the breakwater. They ran on 7 ft 1/4 in (2,140 mm) Brunel gauge track, to make it easier to drop rock from the wagons between the rails. The construction track was run out to sea on a timber framework, a method of construction which was perfected by Sir John Coode. The wagons were initially hauled by either oxen or mules.

Seven Brunel gauge locomotives are known to have been employed on the Table Bay Harbour project, but information on most of them are sketchy at best.

== Locomotives before 1874 ==
Two locomotives were placed in service before 1874, one in 1862 and another at some stage before 19 July 1870. It is known that one of them was a 0-4-0 saddle-tank engine built by Hughes's Locomotive & Tramway Engine Works, while there is no knowledge about the builder or appearance of the other and no known photograph of either one has been found. While early researchers believed that the first locomotive of 1862 was the one built by Hughes's, recent research seems to indicate that Hughes's first known locomotive was only delivered to the Carmarthen and Cardigan Railway in Wales in September 1863. It may therefore be that the second locomotive was the Hughes's saddle-tank engine.

=== 1862 ===
The first locomotive arrived on the ship Navarino on 2 October 1862. There is no known photograph of it, and no information about either the builder or the tank configuration have been found. A painting by Otto Lansberg which depicts the breakwater under construction in 1869, shows a side- or well-tank locomotive at work and, since the second locomotive is known to have been a saddle-tank engine, this painting may well depict the first locomotive. Given the possibility of artistic licence, however, the painting cannot be accepted as factual confirmation of the locomotive's appearance or configuration.

=== Between 1863 and 1870 ===
Reference to a second locomotive was made in a report in the Cape Argus on 19 July 1870, in which it was mentioned as "the first locomotive made in South Africa" while the activities were described as "wagons that were hauled along several lines of railway by two engines". It was a 0-4-0 saddle-tank locomotive, now believed to have been built by Henry Hughes and Company, which was shipped to the Cape as a kit of parts to be assembled by the customer. Since Hughes's works started building locomotives around 1863, it would follow that the in-service date of the second locomotive was at some time between 1863 and 1870.

== The 0-4-0T locomotive of 1874 ==
The third locomotive to enter service at Table Bay Harbour, the 0-4-0T engine which is the subject of this page, was obtained from Fletcher, Jennings & Co. in 1874. Apart from the photograph, not much is known about the locomotive, which had a cab roof with a spectacle plate front weatherboard to offer the crew some protection from the elements. In Harbour Board minutes at the time, one of the earlier two locomotives was now referred to as the "spare locomotive".

== Locomotives after 1874 ==
=== 1879 ===
The fourth locomotive to enter service on the Table Bay harbour project was the 0-4-0WT of 1879, also built by Fletcher, Jennings.

=== 1881 and 1893 ===
Two Brunel gauge 0-4-0ST locomotives were placed in service on the Table Bay Harbour project in 1881, built by Black, Hawthorn & Co. Another one was delivered in 1893, with works number 1079. These three locomotives bore engine numbers 4, 5 and 8.

== Termination ==
Work on the project continued into the 20th century, since even further harbour expansion soon became necessary, brought about by developments in the interior such as the discovery of diamonds and gold and then the outbreak of the Second Boer War. A dry dock was added in 1881 and work began in 1900 on a new breakwater and the Victoria Basin.

The Brunel gauge harbour construction railway remained in operation until 1904.
