= 1889 in South Africa =

- Decades: 1860s; 1870s; 1880s; 1890s; 1900s
- See also: List of years in South Africa

The following lists events that happened during 1889 in South Africa.

== Incumbents ==
- Governor of the Cape of Good Hope and High Commissioner for Southern Africa: Hercules Robinson then Henry Brougham Loch.
- Governor of the Colony of Natal:
  - until 5 June: Arthur Elibank Havelock.
  - 5 June – 1 December: vacant
  - starting 1 December: Charles Bullen Hugh Mitchell.
- State President of the Orange Free State: Pieter Jeremias Blignaut (until 10 January), Francis William Reitz (starting 10 January).
- State President of the South African Republic: Paul Kruger.
- Prime Minister of the Cape of Good Hope: John Gordon Sprigg.

== Events ==
March

- 13 – The Potchefstroom treaty is signed by Paul Kruger and F.W. Reitz, the respective Presidents of the South African Republic (ZAR) and the Orange Free State. The treaty binds each state to assist the other whenever either is unjustly attacked.

October

- 29 – The British South Africa Company receives a Royal Charter.

Unknown date

- In Transvaal a national rugby team is formed.

== Births ==
- 16 March – Reggie Walker, 1908 Olympic champion in the 100 metres. (d. 1951)

== Railways ==
=== Railway lines opened ===
- 23 April – Namaqualand – Braakpits Junction to Flat Mine, Concordia, 9 miles (14.5 kilometres).
- 4 September – Natal – Ladysmith to Glencoe Junction, 41 miles 5 chains (66.1 kilometres).
- 21 October – Cape Western – Eerste River to Somerset West, 8 miles 79 chains (14.5 kilometres).

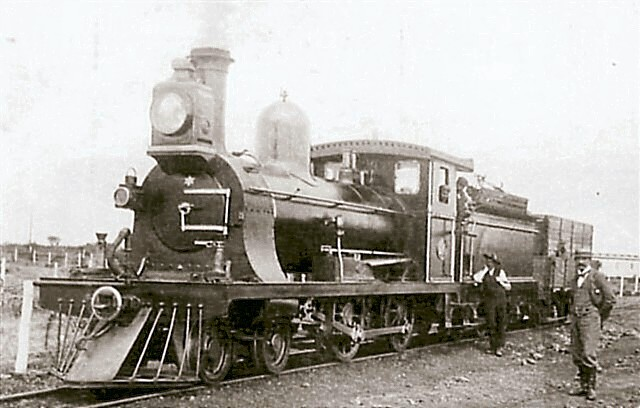
CGR 3rd Class 4-4-0

=== Locomotives ===
Cape

The Cape Government Railways places twenty-four 3rd Class 4-4-0 American type tender locomotives in passenger service on the Cape Western System, the first stock locomotives to be built in quantity to detailed designs prepared in the Cape Colony.

Transvaal

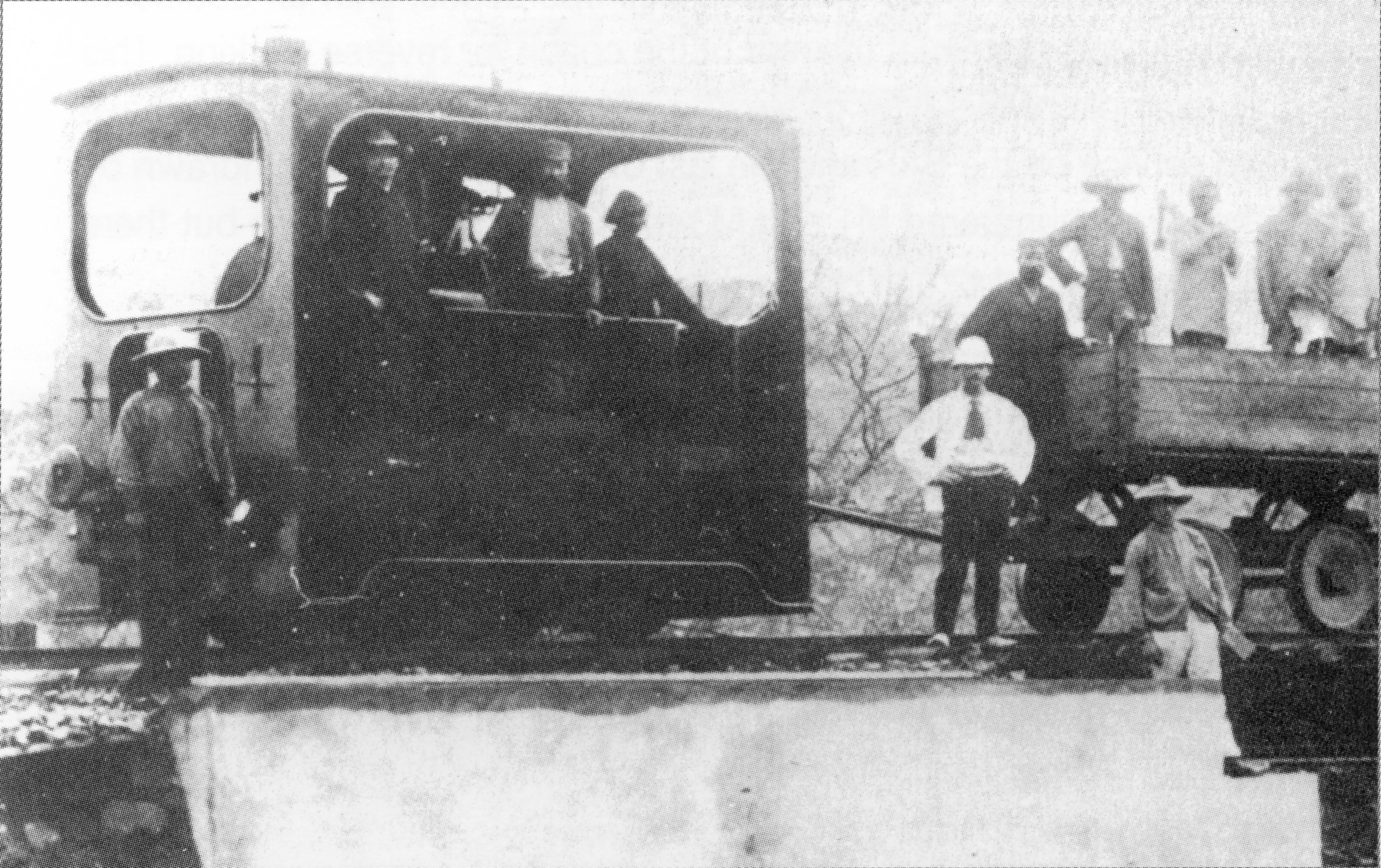
NZASM 10 Tonner 0-4-0T

Three locomotive types enter service on the newly established Nederlandsche-Zuid-Afrikaansche Spoorwegmaatschappij:

- The first of three 10 Tonner tramway locomotives for use on its first railway line which is being constructed from Johannesburg to Boksburg.
- One 13 Tonner locomotive for use on this line which would become known as the Randtram line.
- Five 14 Tonner locomotives for use on the Randtram line.
