= 1890 in South Africa =

- Decades: 1870s; 1880s; 1890s; 1900s; 1910s
- See also: List of years in South Africa

The following lists events that happened during 1890 in South Africa.

== Incumbents ==
- Governor of the Cape of Good Hope and High Commissioner for Southern Africa:Henry Brougham Loch.
- Governor of the Colony of Natal: Charles Bullen Hugh Mitchell.
- State President of the Orange Free State: Francis William Reitz.
- State President of the South African Republic: Paul Kruger.
- Prime Minister of the Cape of Good Hope: John Gordon Sprigg (until 16 July), Cecil John Rhodes (starting 16 July).

== Events ==
March

- 17 – The first railway line in the Transvaal, known as the Randtram, is opened for service between Boksburg and Braamfontein in Johannesburg.

June

- 6 – Magadu Bhambada becomes chief of the AmaZondi people at the age of 25 after the death of his father and uncle.
- 23 June – President Paul Kruger of the South African Republic institutes a Second Volksraad which is responsible for controlling local matters.

July

- 17 – Cecil Rhodes becomes Prime Minister of the Cape Colony.

== Births ==
- 26 October – Percy Hansen, Danish soldier in British service, recipient of the Victoria Cross. (d. 1951)

== Railways ==
=== Railway lines opened ===
- 1 February – Cape Western – Somerset West to Sir Lowry's Pass Village, 5 miles 20 chains (8.4 kilometres).
- 28 March – Natal – Glencoe Junction to Talana, 8 miles 35 chains (13.6 kilometres).
- 15 May – Natal – Glencoe Junction to Newcastle, 36 miles 33 chains (58.6 kilometres).
- 13 October – Transvaal – Braamfontein to Springs, 30 miles (48.3 kilometres).
- 17 November – Transvaal – Braamfontein to Roodepoort, 11 miles (17.7 kilometres).
- 1 December – Cape Western – Kalkbaai to Simon's Town, 5 miles 37 chains (8.8 kilometres).

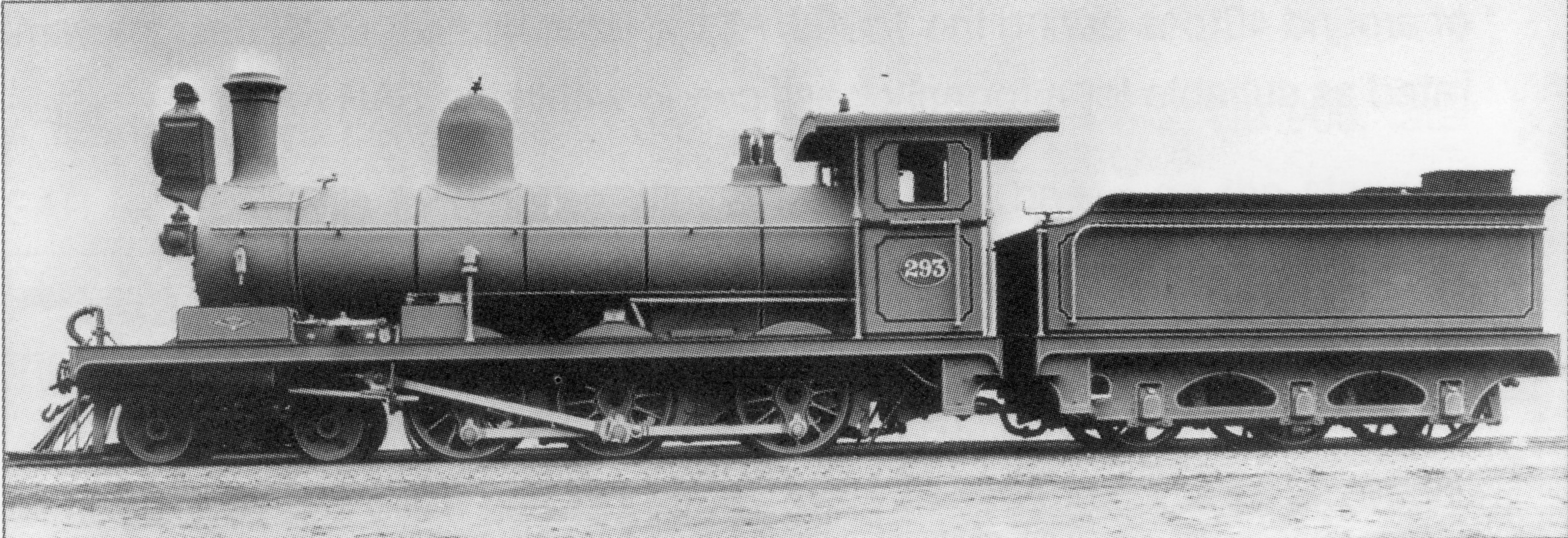
CGR 5th Class 4-6-0

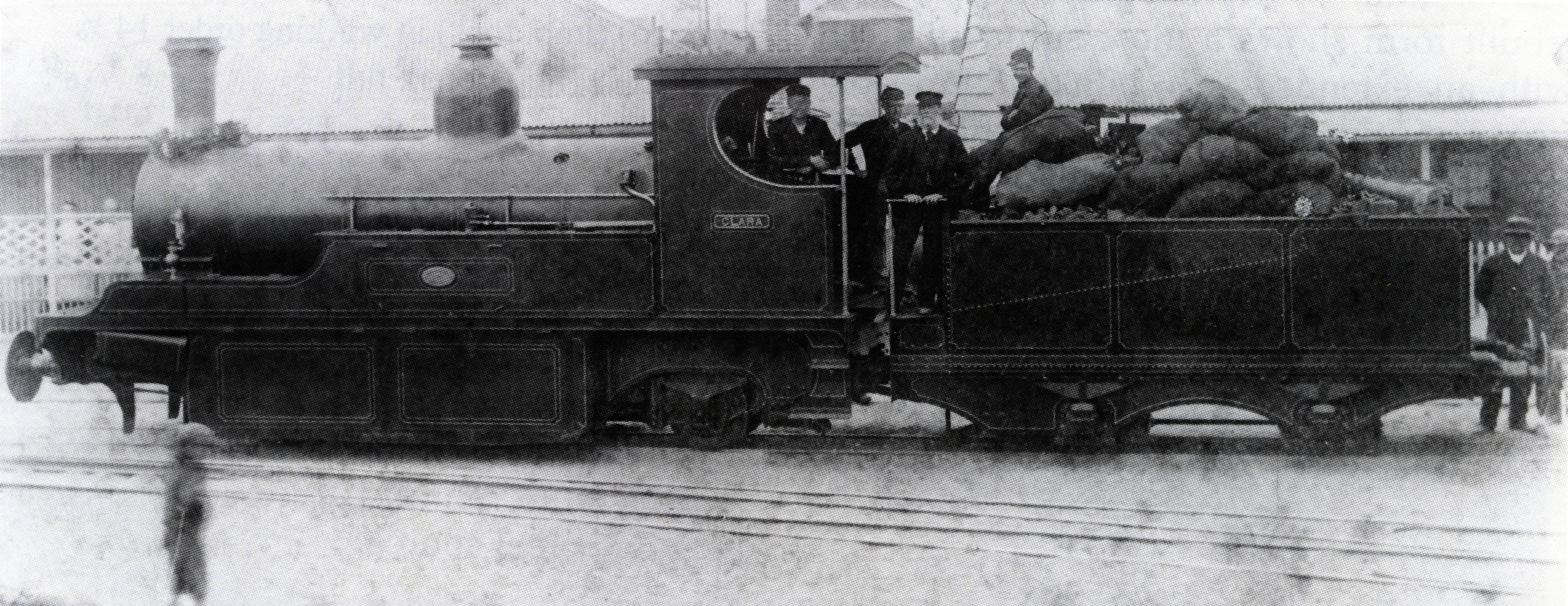
Namaqualand 0-6-2 Clara Class

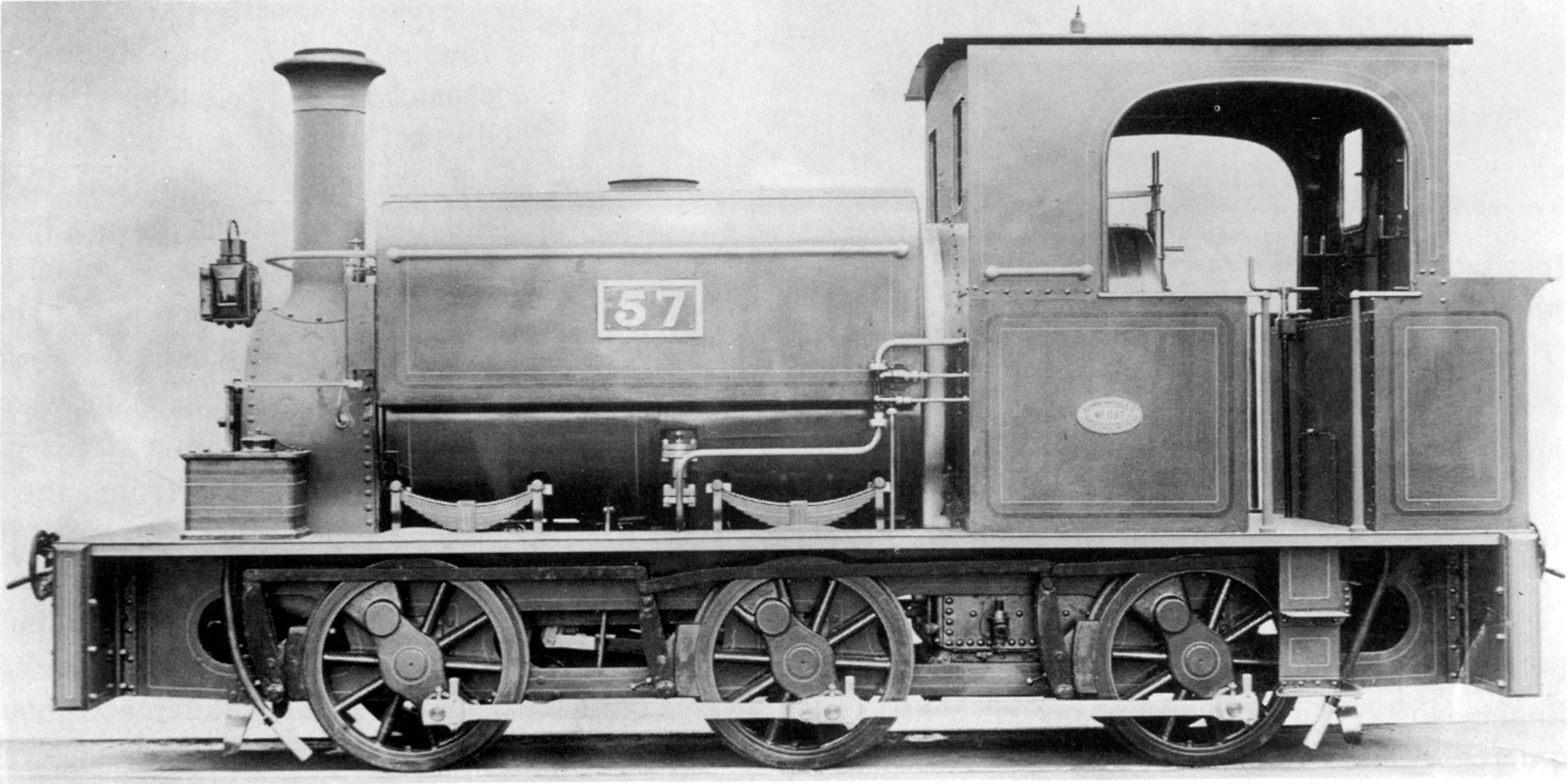
NZASM 18 Tonner 0-6-0ST

- 1 December – Cape Western – Kimberley to Vryburg, 126 miles 61 chains (204.0 kilometres).
- 17 December – Cape Midland – Colesberg Junction to Norvalspont bridge, 23 miles 43 chains (37.9 kilometres).
- 17 December – Free State – Norvalspont bridge to Bloemfontein, 120 miles 67 chains (194.5 kilometres).

=== Locomotives ===
Cape

- The Cape Government Railways places twenty 5th Class 4-6-0 tender locomotives in mainline service on its Midland and Western Systems.
- The first of four Clara Class 0-6-2 tender locomotives are placed in service by the Cape Copper Company on its 2 ft 6 in (762 mm) narrow gauge Namaqualand Railway between Port Nolloth and O'okiep.

Transvaal

- The Nederlandsche-Zuid-Afrikaansche Spoorwegmaatschappij (NZASM) of the Zuid-Afrikaansche Republiek (Transvaal Republic) places six 18 Tonner saddle-tank locomotives in service on construction work on the Delagoa Bay line.
