= 1888 in South Africa =

- Decades: 1860s; 1870s; 1880s; 1890s; 1900s
- See also: List of years in South Africa

The following lists events that happened during 1888 in South Africa.

== Incumbents ==
- Governor of the Cape of Good Hope and High Commissioner for Southern Africa: Hercules Robinson.
- Governor of the Colony of Natal: Arthur Elibank Havelock.
- State President of the Orange Free State: Jan Brand (until 14 July), Pieter Jeremias Blignaut (starting 14 July).
- State President of the South African Republic: Paul Kruger.
- Prime Minister of the Cape of Good Hope: John Gordon Sprigg.

== Events ==
March

- 13 – De Beers Consolidated Mines Ltd. is founded in Kimberley.

October

- 30 – Cecil Rhodes and the British South Africa Company obtains Matabeleland from Lobengula in the Rudd Concession, named after Charles Rudd.

Unknown date

- The Eastern Province Rugby Union is founded.
- The town of Amersfoort is established around a Dutch Reformed Church built in 1876.

== Deaths ==
- 26 April – William Wellington Gqoba, author, dies at Lovedale near Alice.
- 9 July – Sir Jan Brand, 4th president of the Orange Free State. (b. 1823)

== Railways ==
=== Locomotives ===
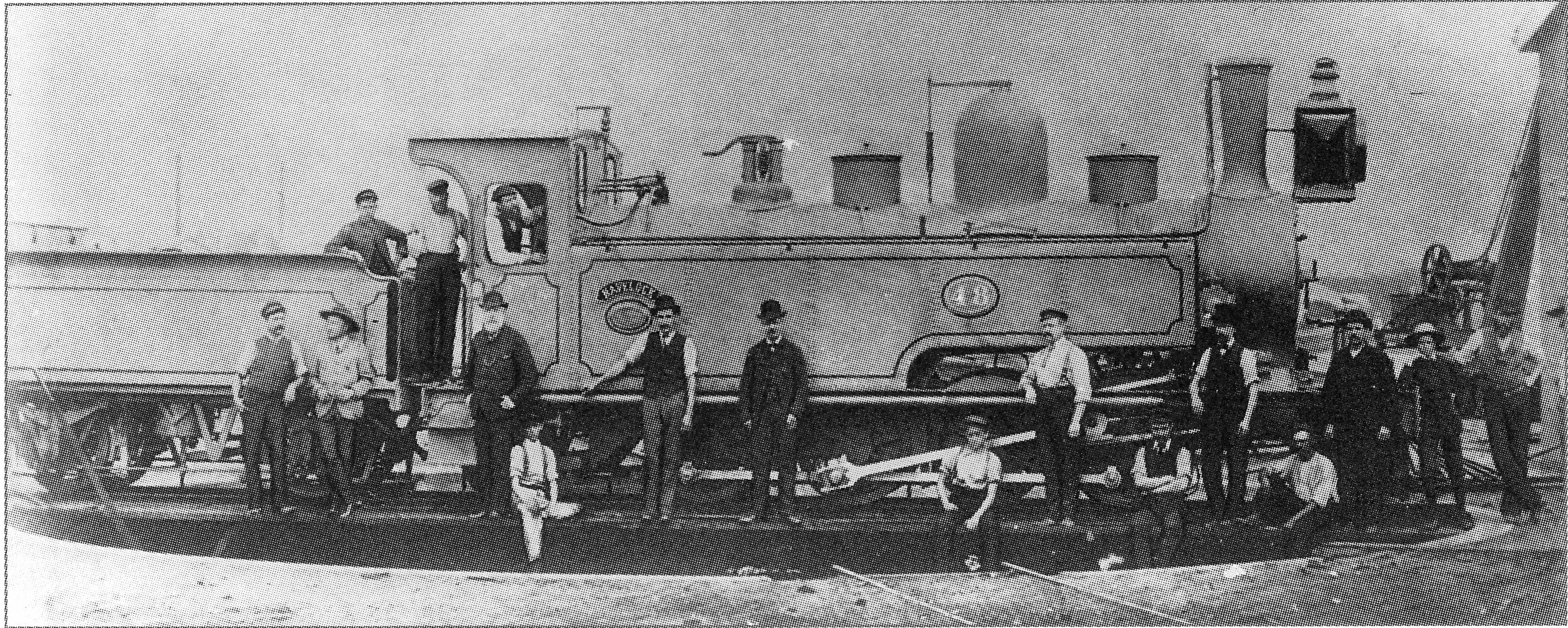
NGR 4-6-2TT Havelock

Two new 3 ft 6 in (1,067 mm) Cape gauge locomotive types enter service on the Natal Government Railways (NGR):

- The locomotive named Havelock, built in the Durban workshops and known as Hairy Mary during the Second Boer War, is the first locomotive to be designed and built in South Africa.
- The first five of 100 Class D 4-8-2 tank locomotives, the first in the world to have the Mountain type wheel arrangement.
