= CGR 1st Class 4-4-0TT =

South African steam locomotive

CGR 1st Class 4-4-0TT OVGS 1st Class 4-4-0TT South African Class 01 4-4-0TT
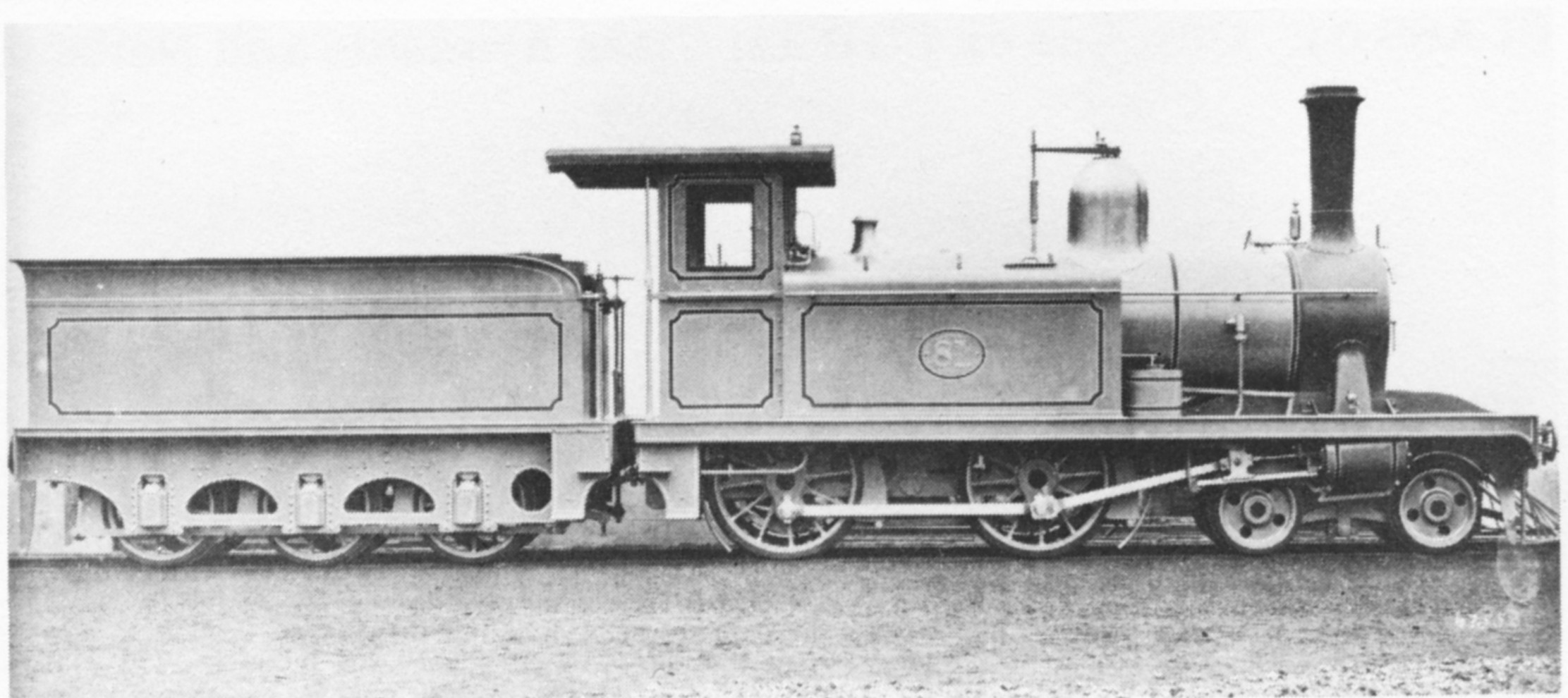
- Works picture of CGR 1st Class 4-4-0TT, c. 1881
Type and origin
- Power type: Steam
- Designer: Robert Stephenson and Company
- Builder: Neilson and Company
- Serial number: 2680-2685
- Build date: 1881
- Total produced: 6
Specifications
- Configuration
  - Whyte: 4-4-0T+T (American)
  - UIC: 2'Bn2t
- Driver: 1st coupled axle
- Gauge: 3 ft 6 in (1,067 mm) Cape gauge
- Leading dia.: 27 in (686 mm)
- Coupled dia.: 48 in (1,219 mm)
- Tender wheels: 36 in (914 mm)
- Wheelbase: 33 ft 2 3/4 in (10,128 mm)
  - Engine: 17 ft 4 in (5,283 mm)
  - Leading: 4 ft 8 in (1,422 mm)
  - Coupled: 6 ft 6 in (1,981 mm)
  - Tender: 8 ft (2,438 mm)
- Length
  - Over couplers: 40 ft 8 7/8 in (12,417 mm)
- Width: 6 ft 10 in (2,083 mm)
- Height: 12 ft (3,658 mm)
- Frame type: Plate
- Axle load: 8 LT 1 cwt (8,179 kg)
  - Leading: 7 LT 3 cwt (7,265 kg)
  - 1st coupled: 7 LT 19 cwt 1 qtr (8,090 kg)
  - 2nd coupled: 8 LT 1 cwt (8,179 kg)
  - Tender axle: 5 LT 16 cwt (5,893 kg)
- Adhesive weight: 16 LT (16,260 kg)
- Loco weight: 23 LT 3 cwt (23,520 kg)
- Tender weight: 17 LT 8 cwt (17,680 kg)
- Total weight: 40 LT 11 cwt (41,200 kg)
- Tender type: 3-axle
- Fuel type: Coal
- Fuel capacity: 2 LT 10 cwt (2.5 t)
- Water cap.: 450 imp gal (2,050 L) engine
- Tender cap.: 1,700 imp gal (7,730 L)
- Firebox
  - Type: Round-top
  - Grate area: 10.5 sq ft (0.98 m^{2})
- Boiler
  - Pitch: 5 ft 10 in (1,778 mm)
  - Tube plates: 9 ft (2,743 mm)
- Boiler pressure: 130 psi (896 kPa)
- Safety valve: Salter
- Heating surface
  - Firebox: 55 sq ft (5.1 m^{2})
  - Tubes: 494.7 sq ft (45.96 m^{2})
  - Total surface: 549.7 sq ft (51.07 m^{2})
- Cylinders: Two
- Cylinder size: 14 in (356 mm) bore 18 in (457 mm) stroke
- Valve gear: Stephenson
- Couplers: Johnston link-and-pin
Performance figures
- Tractive effort: 7,167 lbf (31.88 kN) @ 75%
Career
- Operators: Cape Government Railways; OVGS; South African Railways
- Class: CGR 1st Class, SAR Class 01
- Number in class: 6
- Numbers: M44-M49
- Delivered: 1881
- First run: 1881

The Cape Government Railways 1st Class 4-4-0TT of 1881 was a South African steam locomotive from the pre-Union era in the Cape of Good Hope.

In 1881, the Cape Government Railways placed six more 1st Class tank-and-tender locomotives with a 4-4-0 American type wheel arrangement in service on the Midland System. These engines were built as tender locomotives, without on-board coal bunkers and with permanently attached coal and water tenders.

== Manufacturer ==
Six 4-4-0 side-tank-and-tender passenger locomotives were built for the Cape Government Railways (CGR) by Neilson and Company in 1881, numbered in the range from M44 to M49 in the Midland System's number range. They were built to the same specifications as the eleven 1st Class 4-4-0T locomotives of 1875, but without the onboard coal bunker and with the plate frame shortened accordingly. Instead, they were equipped with permanently attached six-wheeled tenders with an estimated capacity of 1,700 imperial gallons (7,730 litres) water and 2 long tons 10 hundredweight (2.5 tonnes) coal.

They were also designated 1st Class when a locomotive classification system was introduced by the CGR.

== Service ==
=== Cape Government Railways ===
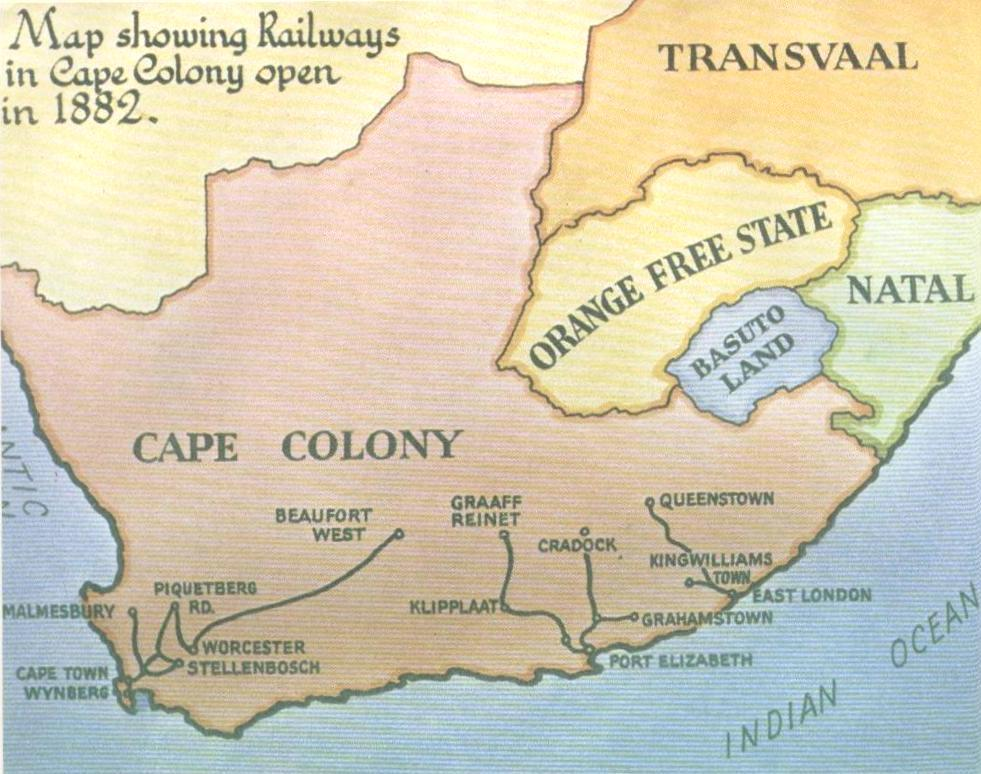

At the time these locomotives entered service, the two Midland lines from Port Elizabeth were open as far as Graaff Reinet and Cradock respectively.

One of these locomotives, no. M48, later became known as the Colesberg Buster during the years it worked on the line between Colesberg Junction and Colesberg town. In this role, it was equipped with one of the older small four-wheeled tenders.

According to some sources, one of these locomotives, no. 445, was sold to the Nyasaland Railways at some stage. This has since been proven untrue, since no evidence of such a sale have come to light and the particular locomotive is referred to in the South African Railways (SAR) renumbering and classification lists of 1912 as being at Uitenhage and recommended for scrapping.

=== Oranje-Vrijstaat Gouwerment-Spoorwegen ===
The Oranje-Vrijstaat Gouwerment-Spoorwegen (OVGS) acquired its first locomotives second-hand from the CGR towards the end of 1896. The OVGS 1st Class was, according to the original engine power chart of that railway, a 4-4-0 tank-and-tender locomotive with a three-axle tender. One source proposed that these engines were from the CGR 1st Class 4-4-0T of 1875, which had their optional two-axle tenders replaced with three-axle tenders and their cylinder bore increased from 13 inches (330 millimetres) to 14 inches (356 millimetres), amongst other modifications.

More likely candidates which better fit the description on the OVGS engine power chart in respect of cylinder bore, tender and lack of onboard coal bunker, may be one or more of these 1st Class 4-4-0TT engines of 1881, numbers 444, 446 and 447, which were last reflected on the CGR roster in 1896.

=== South African Railways ===
When the Union of South Africa was established on 31 May 1910, the three Colonial government railways (CGR, Natal Government Railways and Central South African Railways) were united under a single administration to control and administer the railways, ports and harbours of the Union. Although the South African Railways and Harbours came into existence in 1910, the actual classification and renumbering of all the rolling stock of the three constituent railways was only implemented with effect from 1 January 1912.

By 1912, only three of these locomotives survived. One was locomotive no. 445, which had allegedly earlier been sold to Nyasaland and which, at the time, was found to be rostered at Uitenhage on the Midland system. It was considered obsolete by the SAR and was excluded from the classification and renumbering schedules. The other two, numbers 448 and 449, were also considered obsolete and were therefore designated Class 01 and renumbered to 0448 and 0449 respectively. They were all withdrawn from service in 1913.

== Renumbering ==
All these locomotives were renumbered at least three times during the CGR era, whenever a new numbering system was adopted. By 1886, the system prefixes had been done away with, the "M" having been replaced by the numeral "1". Further renumbering was applied by 1890 and again by 1896, when first the leading numeral "1" was replaced by the numeral "2" by 1890, and the leading numeral "2" was, in turn, replaced by the numeral "4" by 1896.

The works numbers, original numbers and renumbering of the Cape 1st Class 4-4-0TT are listed in the table.

CGR 1st Class 4-4-0TT
| Works no. | Orig. no. | 1886 no. | 1890 no. | 1896 no. | 1904 no. | SAR no. | Notes |
|---|---|---|---|---|---|---|---|
| 2680 | M44 | 144 | 244 | 444 | | | OVGS 1st Class? |
| 2681 | M45 | 145 | 245 | 445 | 445 | 0445 | |
| 2682 | M46 | 146 | 246 | 446 | | | OVGS 1st Class? |
| 2683 | M47 | 147 | 247 | 447 | | | OVGS 1st Class? |
| 2684 | M48 | 148 | 248 | 448 | 448 | 0448 | Colesberg Buster |
| 2685 | M49 | 149 | 249 | 449 | 449 | 0449 | |
