= Table Bay Harbour 0-4-0WT =

South African steam locomotive

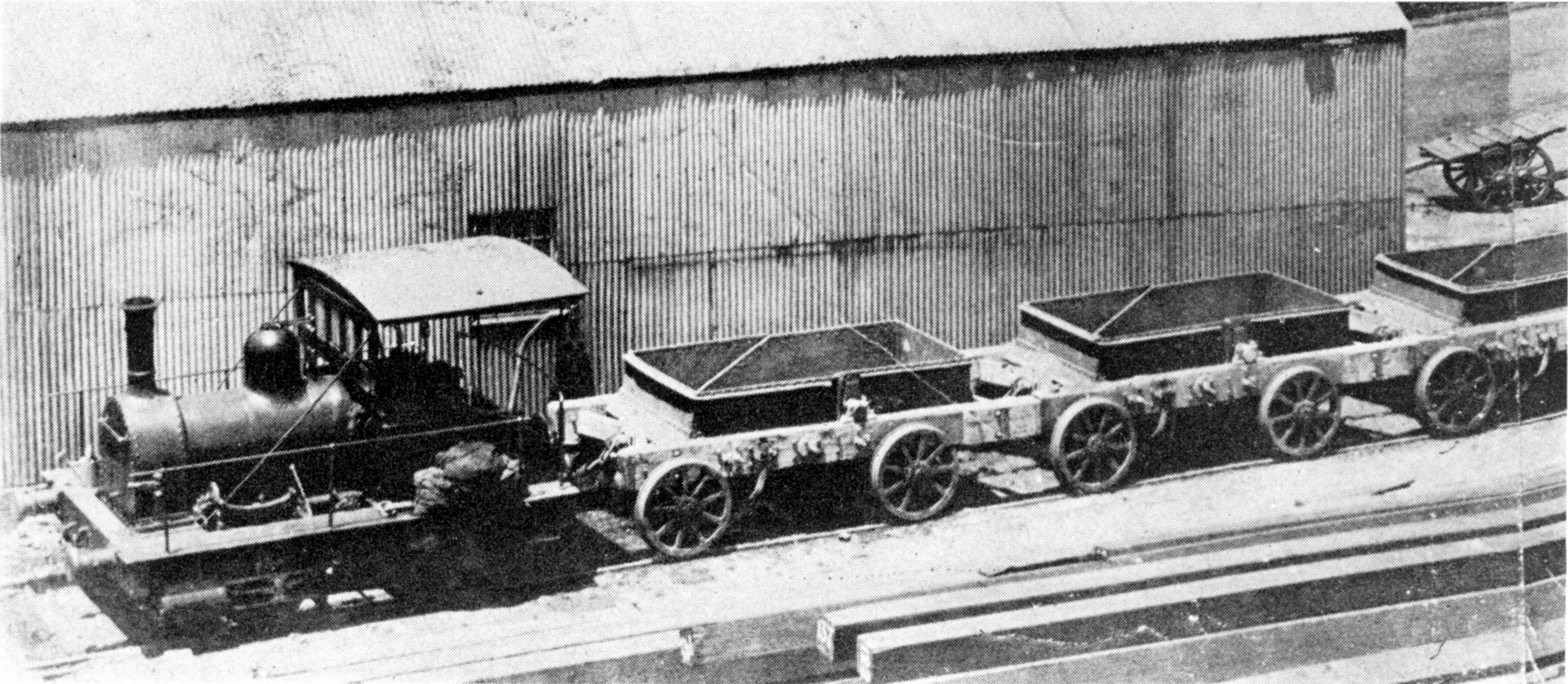
- Table Bay Harbour's Brunel gauge 0-4-0WT construction locomotive of 1879
Type and origin
- Power type: Steam
- Designer: Fletcher, Jennings & Co.
- Builder: Fletcher, Jennings & Co.
- Serial number: 169
- Build date: 1879
Specifications
- Configuration
  - Whyte: 0-4-0WT
  - UIC: Bn2t
- Driver: 2nd coupled axle
- Gauge: 7 ft 1/4 in (2,140 mm) Brunel
- Fuel type: Coal
- Firebox
  - Type: Round-top
- Safety valve: Salter
- Cylinders: Two
- Valve gear: Stephenson
- Couplers: Buffers-and-chain
Career
- Operators: Table Bay Harbour Board
- Number in class: 1
- Delivered: 1879
- First run: 1879
- Withdrawn: 1904

The Table Bay Harbour 0-4-0WT of 1879 was a South African steam locomotive from the pre-Union era in the Cape of Good Hope.

Altogether, seven Brunel gauge locomotives are known to have been employed on the Table Bay Harbour project between 1862 and 1904. The fourth of these construction locomotives was a 7 ft 1/4 in (2,140 mm) Brunel gauge 0-4-0WT well-tank engine which entered excavation and breakwater construction service in 1879.

== Table Bay Harbour ==
Work to improve the facilities at Table Bay Harbour in Cape Town was started in 1860, using convict labour, and consisted of the excavation of two basins and the construction of breakwater piers.

== Harbour construction railway ==
The construction locomotives at Table Bay Harbour were small 7 ft 1/4 in (2,140 mm) Brunel gauge engines which were used to haul trains of heavy iron tip-trucks to convey rock from the Alfred Basin excavation site to the breakwater, which was being built simultaneously. The broad Brunel gauge track was selected to make it easier to drop rock from the trucks between the rails which were run out to sea on a timber framework, a method of construction which was perfected by Sir John Coode. The trucks were equipped with interlocking running boards along the length of the train.

As work progressed, the requirement arose for more locomotives. Seven Brunel gauge locomotives are known to have been employed on the Table Bay Harbour project, but information about each of them is sketchy at best. Three locomotives were placed in service before 1879, one in 1862 and another at some stage between 1863 and 1870. The third locomotive was an 0-4-0T engine which was obtained from Fletcher, Jennings & Co. in 1874.

== The 0-4-0WT locomotive of 1879 ==
In 1879, the fourth locomotive to enter service on the construction site at Table Bay Harbour was the 0-4-0WT engine which is the subject of this page. It was also obtained from Fletcher, Jennings, not from Black, Hawthorn and Company as mentioned in D.F. Holland's work. It was similar to the third locomotive of 1874, but it had a well-tank instead of side-tanks. It also offered the crew some better protection against the elements with a larger roofed cab and a rather ornate wooden frame front screen with five windows.

== Termination ==
After completion of the first basin, named after Prince Alfred, work on the project continued into the 20th century since even further harbour expansion soon became necessary, brought about by developments in the interior such as the discovery of diamonds and gold and then the outbreak of the Second Boer War. A dry dock was added in 1881 and work on a new breakwater and the Victoria Basin began in 1900.

The Brunel gauge harbour construction railway remained in operation until 1904.
