= PPR 35 Tonner 4-6-0T Portuguese =

Class of 2 African 4-6-0T locomotives

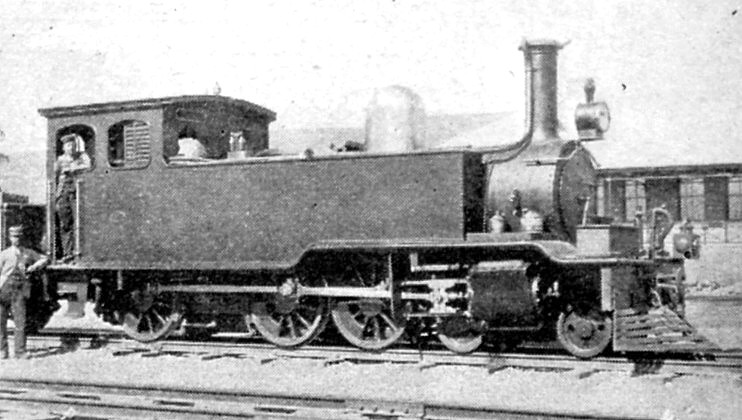
- 35 Tonner Portuguese, c. 1898
Type and origin
- Power type: Steam
- Designer: Nasmyth, Wilson & Company
- Builder: Nasmyth, Wilson & Company
- Serial number: 324-325
- Build date: 1887
- Total produced: 2
Specifications
- Configuration
  - Whyte: 4-6-0T
- Driver: 2nd coupled axle
- Gauge: 3 ft 6 in (1,067 mm) Cape gauge
- Leading dia.: 25 1/2 in (648 mm)
- Coupled dia.: 44 in (1,118 mm)
- Wheelbase: 19 ft 10 1/4 in (6,052 mm)
  - Axle spacing (Asymmetrical): 7 ft 4 in (2,235 mm)
  - Coupled: 11 ft 3 in (3,429 mm)
- Length
  - Over couplers: 28 ft 8 in (8,738 mm)
- Height: 11 ft 8 1/2 in (3,569 mm)
- Loco weight: 35 LT (35,560 kg)
- Fuel type: Coal
- Fuel capacity: 1 LT 10 cwt (1.5 t)
- Water cap.: 840 imp gal (3,820 L)
- Firebox
  - Type: Round-top
  - Grate area: 11.5 sq ft (1.07 m^{2})
- Boiler
  - Pitch: 5 ft 8 in (1,727 mm)
  - Small tubes: 1 1/2 in (38 mm)
- Boiler pressure: 140 psi (965 kPa)
- Safety valve: Ramsbottom
- Cylinders: 2
- Cylinder size: 14 in (356 mm) bore 20 in (508 mm) stroke
- Valve gear: Stephenson
- Couplers: Johnston link-and-pin
Performance figures
- Tractive effort: 9,354 lbf (41.61 kN) @ 75%
Career
- Operators: Delagoa Bay Railway; Pretoria-Pietersburg Railway; Netherlands-South African Railway Company; Imperial Military Railways; Central South African Railways; Olifantsfontein Brick & Tile
- Class: PPR 35 Tonner
- Number in class: 2
- Numbers: Delagoa Bay no. 3
- Official name: Portuguese
- Delivered: 1887
- First run: 1887

The Pretoria-Pietersburg Railway 35 Tonner 4-6-0T of 1887 was a South African steam locomotive from the pre-Union era in Transvaal.

The Lourenco Marques, Delagoa Bay and East Africa Railway in Mozambique placed two tank locomotives with a 4-6-0 wheel arrangement in service in 1887. One of them was sold to the Pretoria-Pietersburg Railway in the Zuid-Afrikaansche Republiek in 1897. The 35 Tonner locomotive was not classified, but named Portuguese and referred to by name.

== The Pretoria-Pietersburg Railway ==
The Pretoria-Pietersburg Railway Company (PPR), incorporated in London on 13 May 1896 with a capital of £500,000, constructed a railway which operated northwards from Pretoria West via Warmbad and Nylstroom to Pietersburg. The 176-mile-long (283-kilometre) railway was constructed under a concession granted by the government of the Zuid-Afrikaansche Republiek (ZAR) to Hendrik Jacobus Schoeman on 30 October 1895. Construction commenced in 1897 and the first 80 miles (130 kilometres) to Nylstroom was opened to traffic by 1 July 1898. Pietersburg was reached on 31 May 1899.

== Origin and manufacturer ==
The Lourenco Marques, Delagoa Bay and East Africa Railway (the Delagoa Bay Railway) in Mozambique placed two tank locomotives with a 4-6-0 wheel arrangement in service in 1887, built by Nasmyth, Wilson & Company and numbered 3 and 4.

== Service ==
=== Pretoria-Pietersburg Railway ===
Ten years later, in 1897, the Delagoa Bay's engine no. 3 was sold to the PPR. The locomotive was not classified or numbered by the PPR, but named Portuguese. It became commonly known as the Portuguese Tank.

Since the first part of their railway to Nylstroom was still being built, the PPR employed the Portuguese on construction work and general service. The locomotive had the honour to haul the first revenue-earning train between Pretoria and Nylstroom in July 1898.

=== Netherlands-South African Railway Company ===
As a result of the outbreak of the Second Boer War and since the PPR was owned by a British registered company, the railway and its rolling stock were seized by the ZAR government in October 1899, only five months after the line to Pietersburg was completed. The railway was then briefly worked by the Netherlands-South African Railway Company.

=== Imperial Military Railways ===
All railway operations in the two Boer Republics, the ZAR and the Orange Free State, were taken over by the Imperial Military Railways (IMR) in late 1899 and were operated as a single railway system for the duration of the war.

=== Central South African Railways ===
The engine Portuguese survived the war. At the end of the war in 1902, the IMR was transformed into the Central South African Railways (CSAR).

=== Industry ===
In 1908, the CSAR sold the Portuguese to the Olifantsfontein Brick and Tile Company for £750. It was used there as a yard shunting locomotive for the remainder of its working years.
