= Z. D. Mangoaela =

Zakea Dolphin Mangoaela (February 1883 in Hohobeng, Cape Colony – 25 October 1963) was a folklorist and writer.

Mangoaela grew up in Lesotho (called Basutoland at the time) and went to the Basutoland Training College.

== Works ==
- Lithoko tsa Marena a Basotho (The praise poems of the Basotho kings), published 1921
- Har'a libatana le linyamatsane (Among the predators and the prey)
- Co-authored Grammar of the Sesuto language. Bantu studies Vol. III. (Johannesburg: University of Witwatersrand press, 1927).
