= Henry Ernest Gascoyne Bulwer =

British colonial administrator and diplomat

Sir Henry Ernest Gascoyne Bulwer, GCMG (11 December 1836 – 30 September 1914) was a British colonial administrator and diplomat. He was the nephew of Henry Bulwer, 1st Baron Dalling and Bulwer and brother to Edward Earle Gascoyne Bulwer.

Bulwer was educated at Charterhouse School and Trinity College, Cambridge. Administrative and diplomatic posts held include:

- 1860–1864 – British Resident in Kythira in the Ionian Islands under the Lord High Commissioner, Sir Henry Knight Storks.
- 1865 – Secretary to his uncle, the British Ambassador to the Ottoman Empire in Constantinople.
- 1866 – Receiver-General of Trinidad.
- 1867–1869 – Administrator of the Government of Dominica.
- 1871–1875 – Governor of Labuan and Consular-General in Borneo
- 1875–1880 – Lieutenant Governor of the Colony of Natal.
- 1882–1885 – Governor of the Colony of Natal and Special Commissioner for Zulu Affairs.
- 1886–1892 – High Commissioner in Cyprus.

Bulwer was appointed to the Order of St Michael and St George, as Companion in 1864, Knight Commander in 1874, and as Knight Grand Cross in 1883.

== Commemoration ==
The town of Bulwer in Natal, South Africa was named after him.

While Governor of Labuan he presented the type specimen of Bulwer's pheasant (Lophura bulweri) to the British Museum, a bird consequently named after him.

The author H. Rider Haggard, who had been on his staff in Natal and was his friend, dedicated the novel Marie to Sir Henry Bulwer.
