= Cape Government Railways 1st Class locomotives =

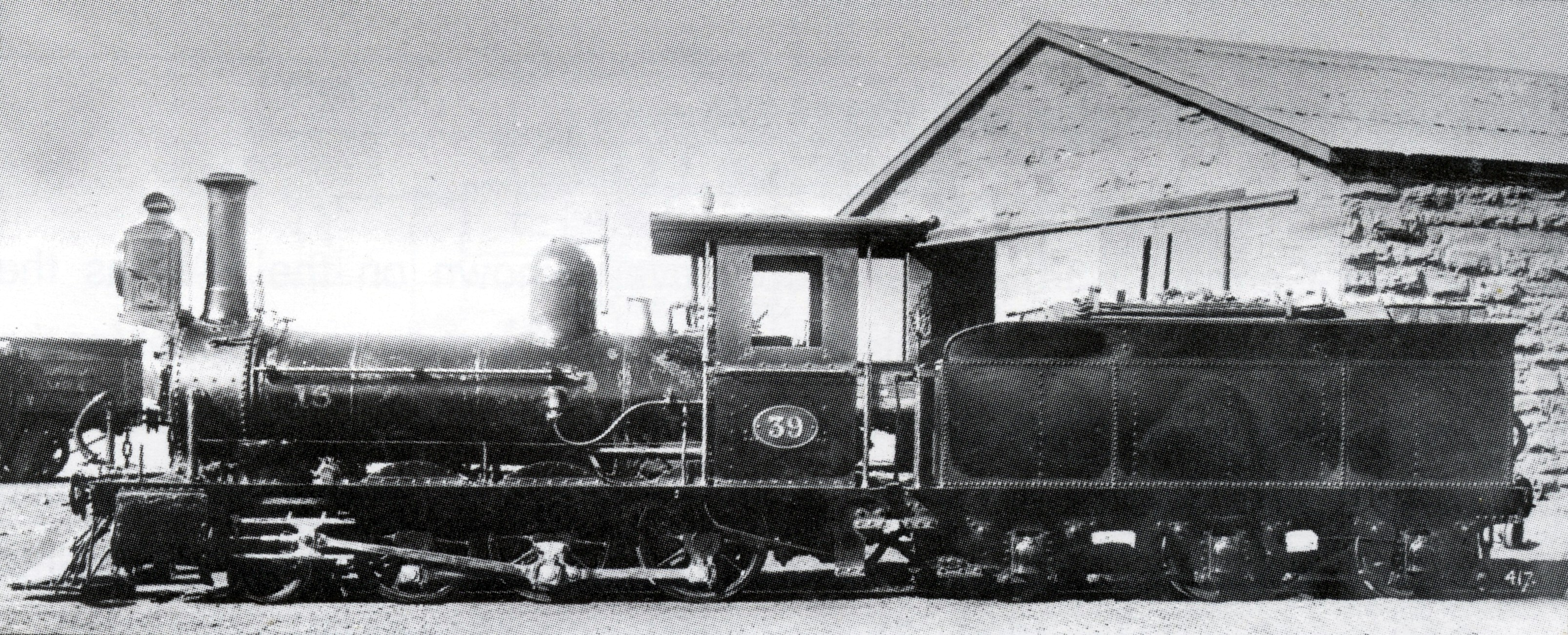
1st Class 2-6-0 of 1876 by Beyer, Peacock

The Cape Government Railways 1st Class locomotives include ten locomotive types, all designated 1st Class irrespective of differences in wheel arrangement or configuration.

When the Union of South Africa was established on 31 May 1910, the three Colonial government railways (Cape Government Railways, Natal Government Railways and Central South African Railways) were united under a single administration to control and administer the railways, ports and harbours of the Union. Those of these locomotives which still survived, were considered obsolete and designated Class 01 on the new South African Railways.

0-4-0 wheel arrangement

- CGR 1st Class 0-4-0ST 1875 (Saddle-tank)
- CGR 1st Class 0-4-0ST 1876 (Saddle-tank)

2-6-0 wheel arrangement

- CGR 1st Class 2-6-0 1876 BP (Tender)
- CGR 1st Class 2-6-0 1876 Kitson (Tender, rebuilt to saddle-tank)
- CGR 1st Class 2-6-0 1879 (Tender)
- CGR 1st Class 2-6-0 1891 (Tender)
- CGR 1st Class 2-6-0ST (Tank, rebuilt to saddle-tank)

4-4-0 wheel arrangement

- CGR 1st Class 4-4-0 (Tender)
- CGR 1st Class 4-4-0T (Tank and optional tender)
- CGR 1st Class 4-4-0TT (Tank-and-tender)
