= 1876 in South Africa =

- Decades: 1850s; 1860s; 1870s; 1880s; 1890s
- See also: List of years in South Africa

The following lists events that happened during 1876 in South Africa.

== Incumbents ==
- Governor of the Cape of Good Hope and High Commissioner for Southern Africa: Henry Barkly.
- Lieutenant-governor of the Colony of Natal: Henry Ernest Gascoyne Bulwer.
- State President of the Orange Free State: Jan Brand.
- State President of the South African Republic: Thomas François Burgers.
- Lieutenant-Governor of Griqualand West: William Owen Lanyon.
- Prime Minister of the Cape of Good Hope: John Charles Molteno.

== Events ==
January

- The inaugural Champion Bat Tournament is held, a predecessor of first-class cricket in South Africa.
- 15 – Die Patriot, the first Afrikaans newspaper, begins to be published in Paarl.

February

- 5 – The ship Memento sinks off East London and two 2nd Class 2-6-2TT locomotives intended for the Eastern System of the Cape Government Railways are lost.

March

- 27 – The Cape Times, the first daily newspaper in South Africa, begins in Cape Town, Cape Colony

June

- 16 – The railway line from Cape Town to Worcester is officially opened.

July

- Construction begins on the Cape Town Central Station as hub to the Cape Government Railways.

October

- 19 – The 2,700 ton steamer Windsor Castle sinks off Dassen Island.

Unknown date

- A Dutch Reformed Church is built at what is now the town of Amersfoort in Mpumalanga Province.
- Prime Minister Molteno travels as plenipotentiary to London to discuss Britain's proposed confederation model for southern Africa.
- The "Molteno Unification Plan" is put forward as an alternative model for eventual political consolidation in southern Africa.
- Isigidimi Sama Xhosa, the first Xhosa-run newspaper, is begun in Lovedale, Cape Colony.
- Britain admits wrongful action in its annexation of Griqualand West.
- President Johannes Brand of the Orange Free State rejects any discussion of Carnarvon's proposed confederation system for Southern Africa.
- The country's first official archives are created when the Cape Government appoints a commission to assemble, sort and index the records of the Cape.
- Southern Africa's first railway tunnel, the Hex River tunnel on the railway line between Osplaas and Matroosberg, is completed.

== Births ==
- 9 October – Solomon Tshekisho Plaatje, intellectual, journalist, linguist, politician, translator, and writer, is born near Boshof, Orange Free State.
- 21 October – Sir Fraser Russell, Governor of Southern Rhodesia. (d. 1952)

== Railways ==
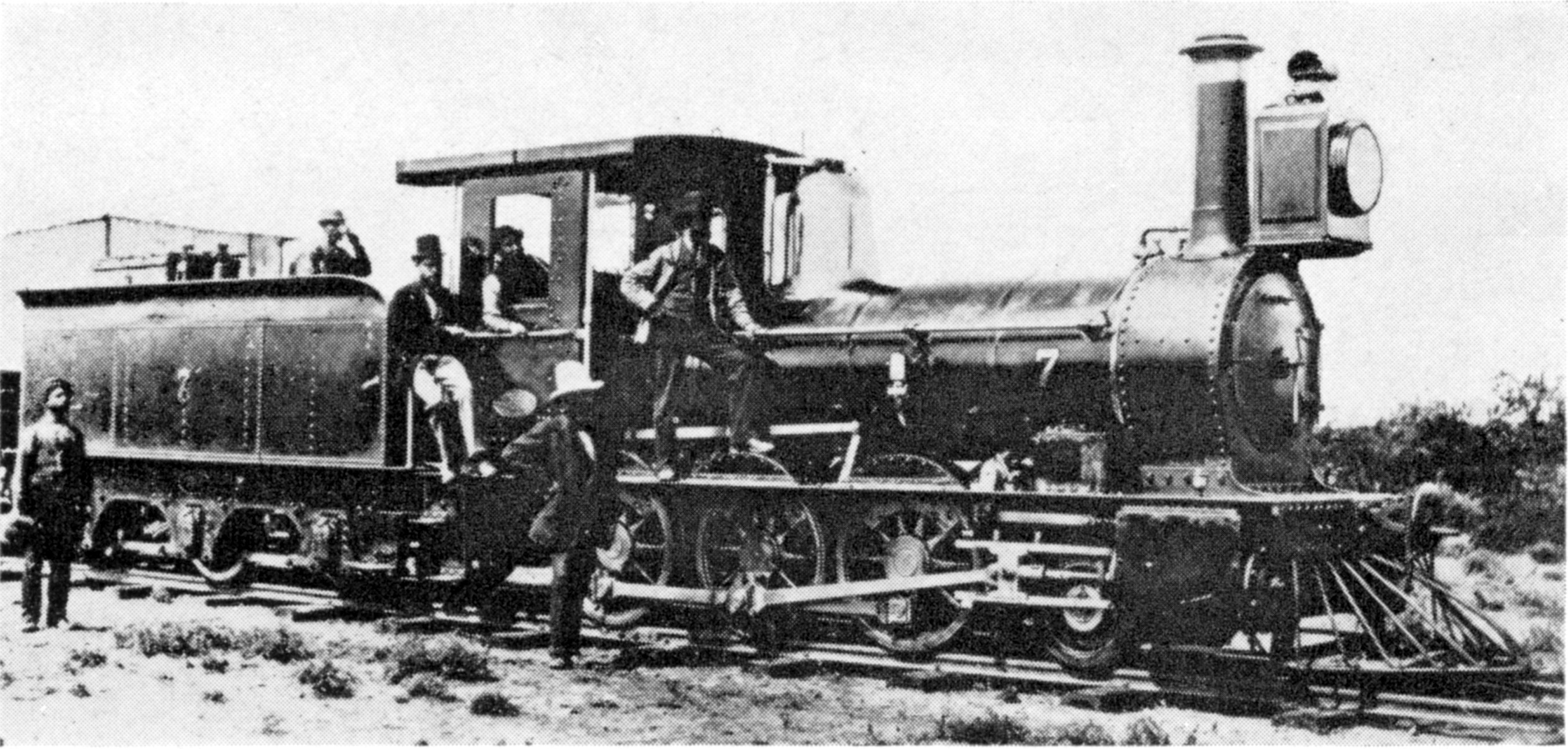
CGR 1st Class 2-6-0 1876 Beyer-Peacock

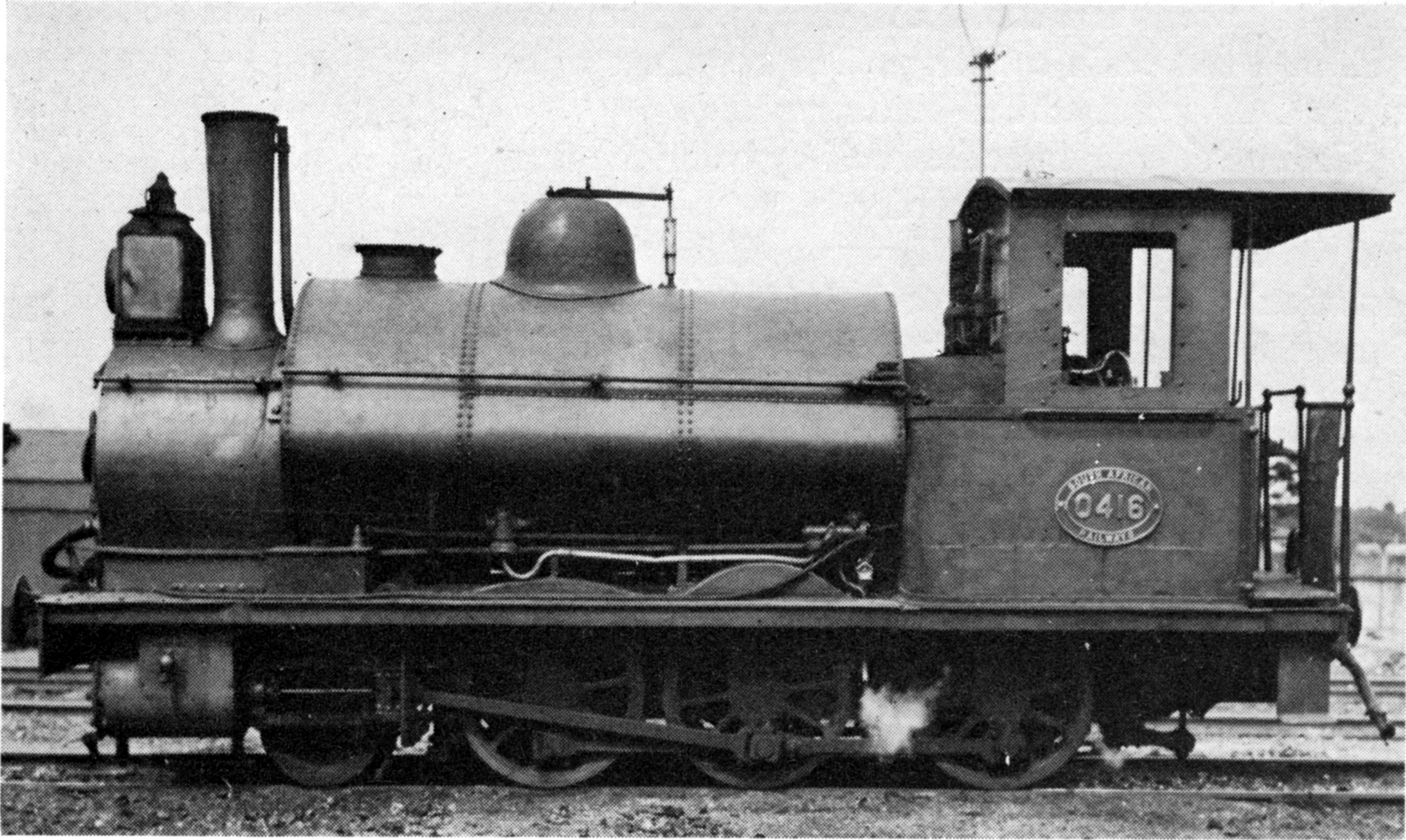
CGR 1st Class 2-6-0ST

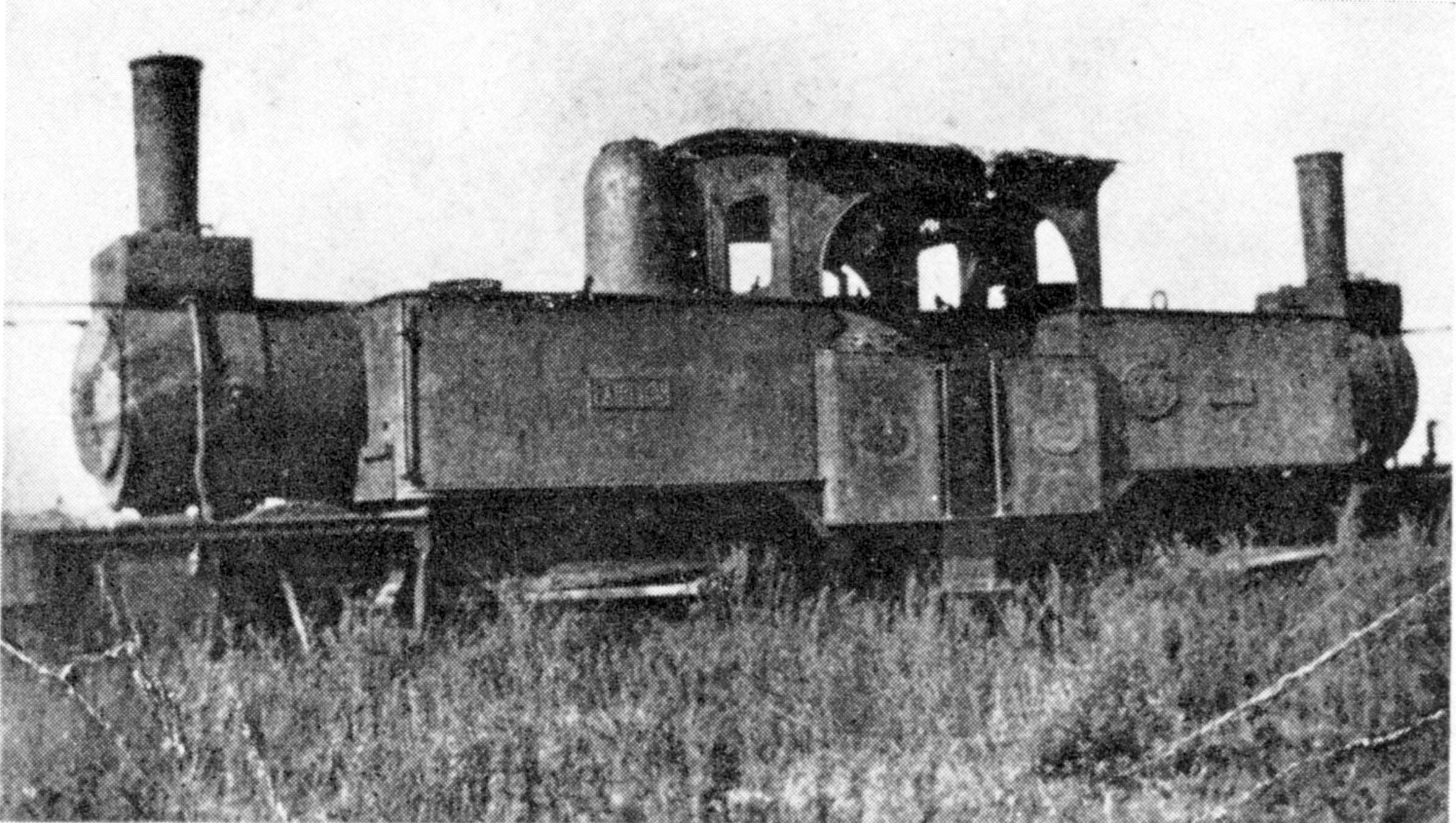
CGR Fairlie 0-6-0+0-6-0

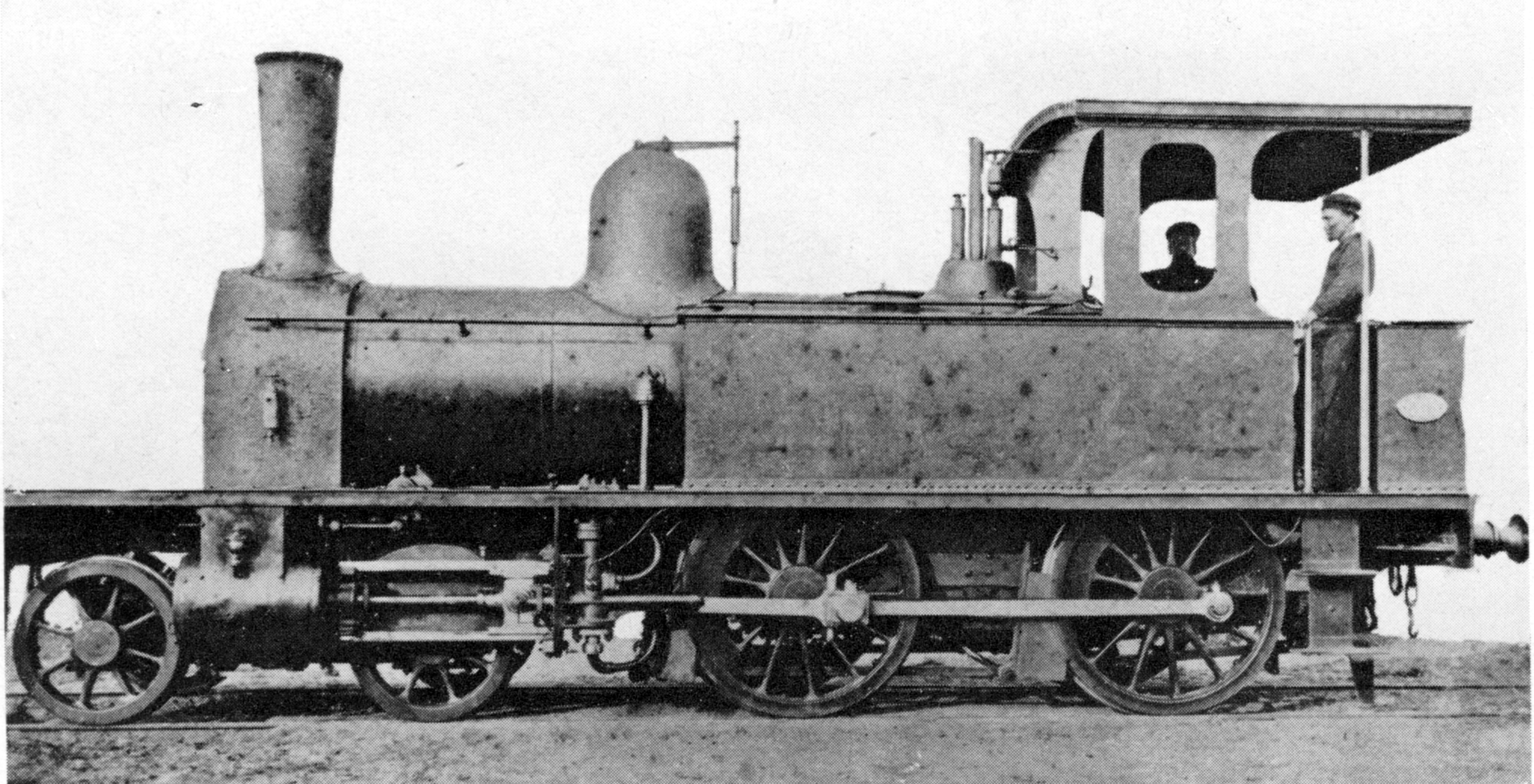
Natal Railway 4-4-0T Perseverance

=== New lines ===
- Construction begins on the East London-King William's Town line.
- In Natal construction begins on the Cape gauge railway line inland from Durban.

=== Railway lines opened ===
- 1 January – Namaqualand – Kookfontein to O'okiep, 32 miles (51.5 kilometres).
- 1 April – Cape Midland – Addo to Sand Flats, 22 miles 30 chains (36.0 kilometres).
- 16 June – Cape Western – Ceres Road to Worcester, 24 miles 38 chains (39.4 kilometres).
- 14 September – Cape Western – Bellville to Muldersvlei, 13 miles 37 chains (21.7 kilometres).
- 18 December – Cape Eastern – East London to Breidbach, 38 miles 73 chains (62.6 kilometres).

=== Locomotives ===
Cape

Six new locomotive types enter service on the Cape Government Railways (CGR):

- The first ten of eighteen 1st Class 2-6-0 Mogul goods locomotives on the Western system.
- A pair of Stephenson's Patent back-to-back 2-6-0 Mogul type side-tank locomotives on the Cape Midland system.
- The first of eight 2-6-0 Mogul tender locomotives on the Midland system, also designated 1st Class, all later rebuilt to saddle-tank shunting engines.
- A single experimental 0-6-0+0-6-0 Fairlie locomotive and a pair of 0-6-0 Stephenson's Patent permanently coupled back-to-back tank locomotives for comparative trials on the Eastern system. The Fairlie is the first articulated locomotive to enter service in South Africa.
- The first of three 1st Class 0-4-0 saddle-tank locomotives with domed boilers on the Eastern System.

Natal

- In January the Natal Railway Company obtains its third and last 4 ft 8 1/2 in (1,435 mm) broad gauge locomotive, a side-tank engine named Perseverance.
