= 1878 in South Africa =

- Decades: 1850s; 1860s; 1870s; 1880s; 1890s
- See also: List of years in South Africa

The following lists events that happened during 1878 in South Africa.

== Incumbents ==
- Governor of the Cape of Good Hope and High Commissioner for Southern Africa: Henry Barkly.
- Lieutenant-governor of the Colony of Natal: Henry Ernest Gascoyne Bulwer.
- State President of the Orange Free State: Jan Brand.
- Administrator of the Government of the Transvaal: Sir Theophilus Shepstone.
- Lieutenant-Governor of Griqualand West: William Owen Lanyon.
- Prime Minister of the Cape of Good Hope: John Gordon Sprigg.

== Events ==
March

- 12 – Commander R.C. Dryer takes possession of the area surrounding Walvis Bay.

May

- 14 – Paul Kruger leads a second deputation to the United Kingdom to demand the freedom of the South African Republic.

July

- 17 – Nqwiliso, tribal chief of western Mpondoland and eldest son of the warrior Chief Ndamase, ceded sovereign rights of Umzimvubu River mouth to the Cape Colony

December

- 11 – The British present an ultimatum to the Zulu king Cetshwayo, triggering the Anglo-Zulu War.

Unknown date

- The 9th Cape Frontier War ends.
- The first telephones are set up in the Cape.
- The telegraph service between Natal and Transvaal is opened.
- The British suspend the elected Cape Government and assume direct control, after escalating disagreements on confederation and frontier policy.
- The last confirmed Cape lion dies.

== Births ==
- 14 March – Alexander du Toit, geologist. (d. 1948)

== Railways ==
=== Railway lines opened ===
- 25 May – Natal – Umgeni to Avoca, 4 miles 21 chains (6.9 kilometres).
- 1 August – Cape Midland – Glenconnor to Mount Stewart, 48 miles 70 chains (78.7 kilometres).
- 15 August – Cape Eastern – Kei Road to Döhne, 20 miles 45 chains (33.1 kilometres).
- 15 August – Cape Eastern – East London to Landing Jetty, 1 mile 58 chains (2.8 kilometres).
- 4 September – Natal – Durban to Pinetown, 17 miles 15 chains (27.7 kilometres).

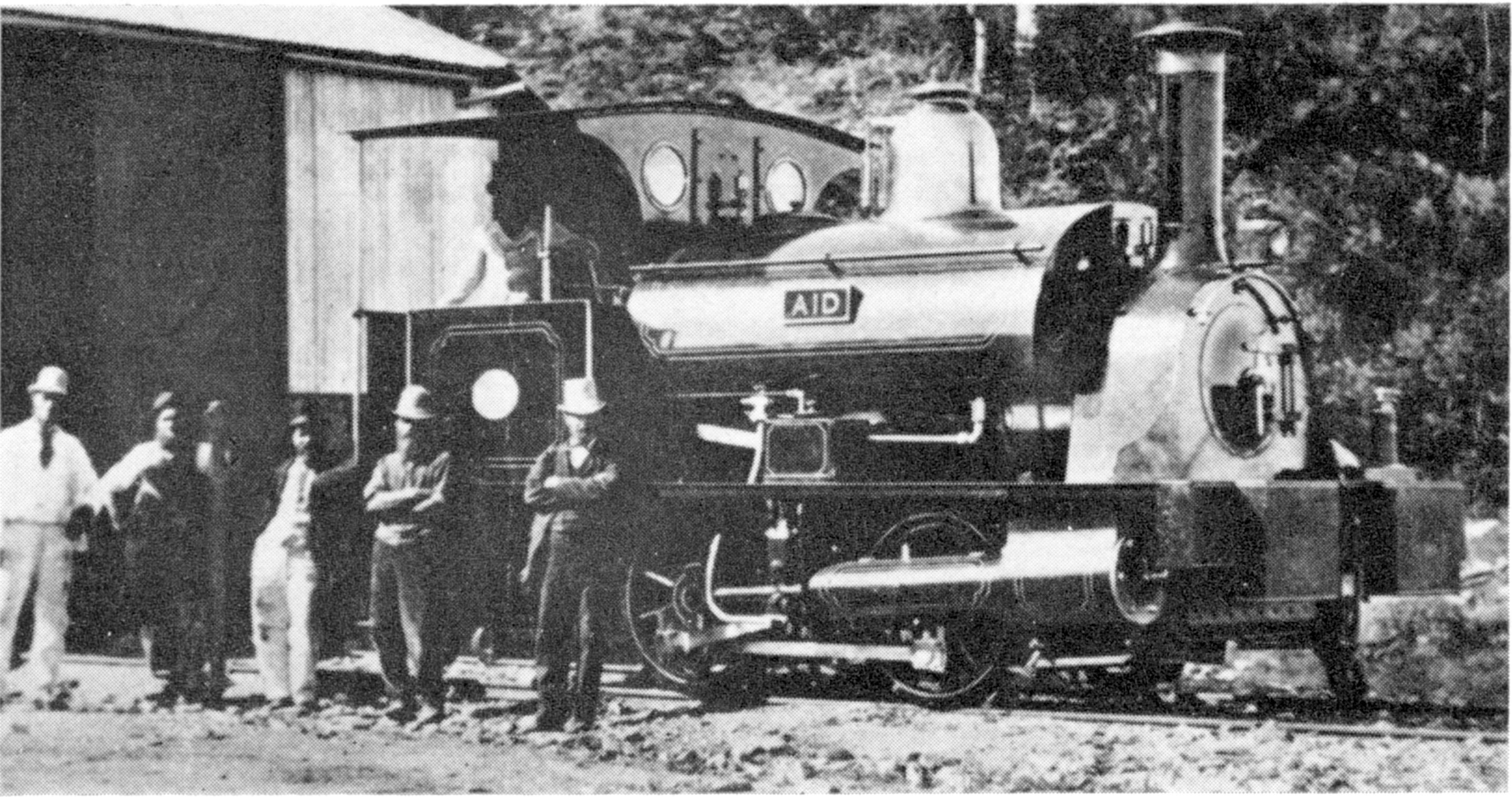
CGR 0-4-0ST Aid

- 4 November – Cape Western – Kleinstraat to Grootfontein, 86 miles 49 chains (139.4 kilometres).

=== Locomotives ===
- The Cape Government Railways places a second locomotive in service on construction work on the Kowie harbour project at Port Alfred, a 4 ft 8 1/2 in (1,435 mm) broad gauge 0-4-0 saddle-tank engine named Aid.
