= 1877 in South Africa =

- Decades: 1850s; 1860s; 1870s; 1880s; 1890s
- See also: List of years in South Africa

The following lists events that happened during 1877 in South Africa.

== Incumbents ==
- Governor of the Cape of Good Hope and High Commissioner for Southern Africa: Henry Barkly (until 31 March), Henry Bartle Frere (starting 31 March).
- Lieutenant-governor of the Colony of Natal: Henry Ernest Gascoyne Bulwer.
- State President of the Orange Free State: Jan Brand.
- State President of the South African Republic: Thomas François Burgers (until 12 April).
- Lieutenant-Governor of Griqualand West: William Owen Lanyon.
- Prime Minister of the Cape of Good Hope: John Charles Molteno.

== Events ==
January

- 1 – The Natal Government Railways takes over all the assets of the Natal Railway Company.

February

- 15 – The first South African International Exhibition opens in Cape Town.

April

- 12 – Theophilus Shepstone annexes the Transvaal Republic as a British colony, in preparation for confederation. Resistance to British rule begins.

May

- 10 – Paul Kruger leads a deputation to the UK to demand the freedom of the South African Republic.

Unknown date

- Bartle Frere, the new Governor of the Cape Colony, arrives with a mandate to impose confederation on the southern African states.
- Native reservations for the Tswana people are established in Griqualand West.
- The Cape Government establishes the Council of Education following the dramatic increase in the number of educational facilities, such as mission schools, on the eastern Cape frontier.
- Cape and British involvement when tribal dispute erupts between the Gcaleka and the Fingo peoples of the eastern Cape frontier leads to the 9th Cape Frontier War which ends the following year.
- Bartle Frere orders the disarmament and eviction of Gcaleka people and allows white settlement on Gcaleka land.

== Births ==
- 21 February – Jakob Daniël du Toit, poet, aka Totius. (died 1953)
- 4 December – Morris Alexander, politician (d. 1946)

== Railways ==
=== Railway lines opened ===
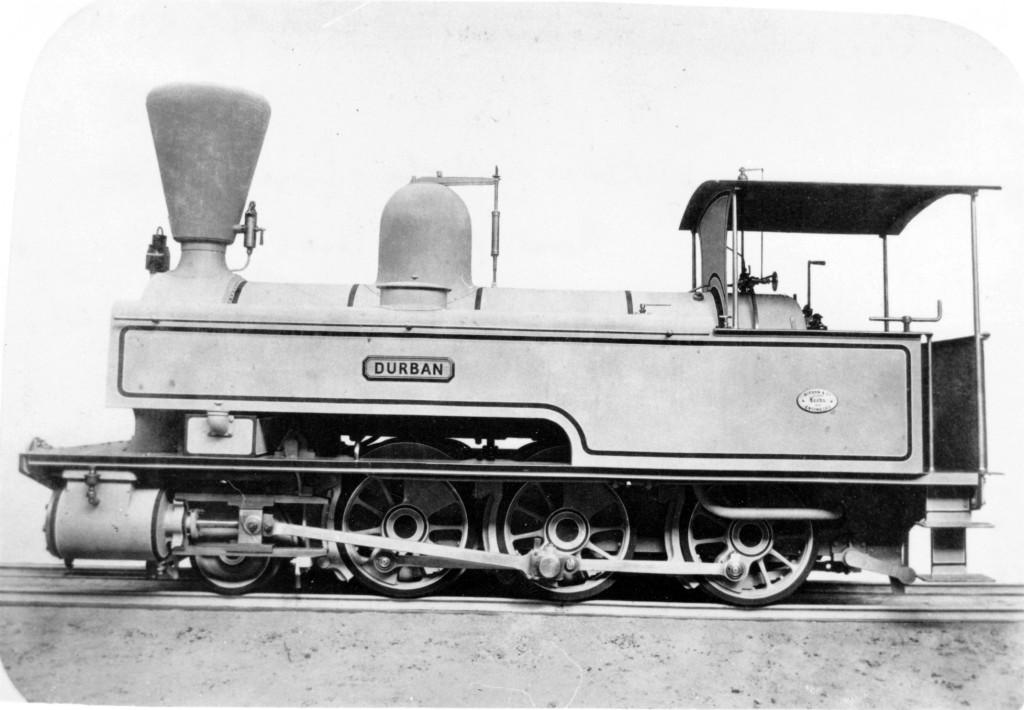
NGR 2-6-0T Durban

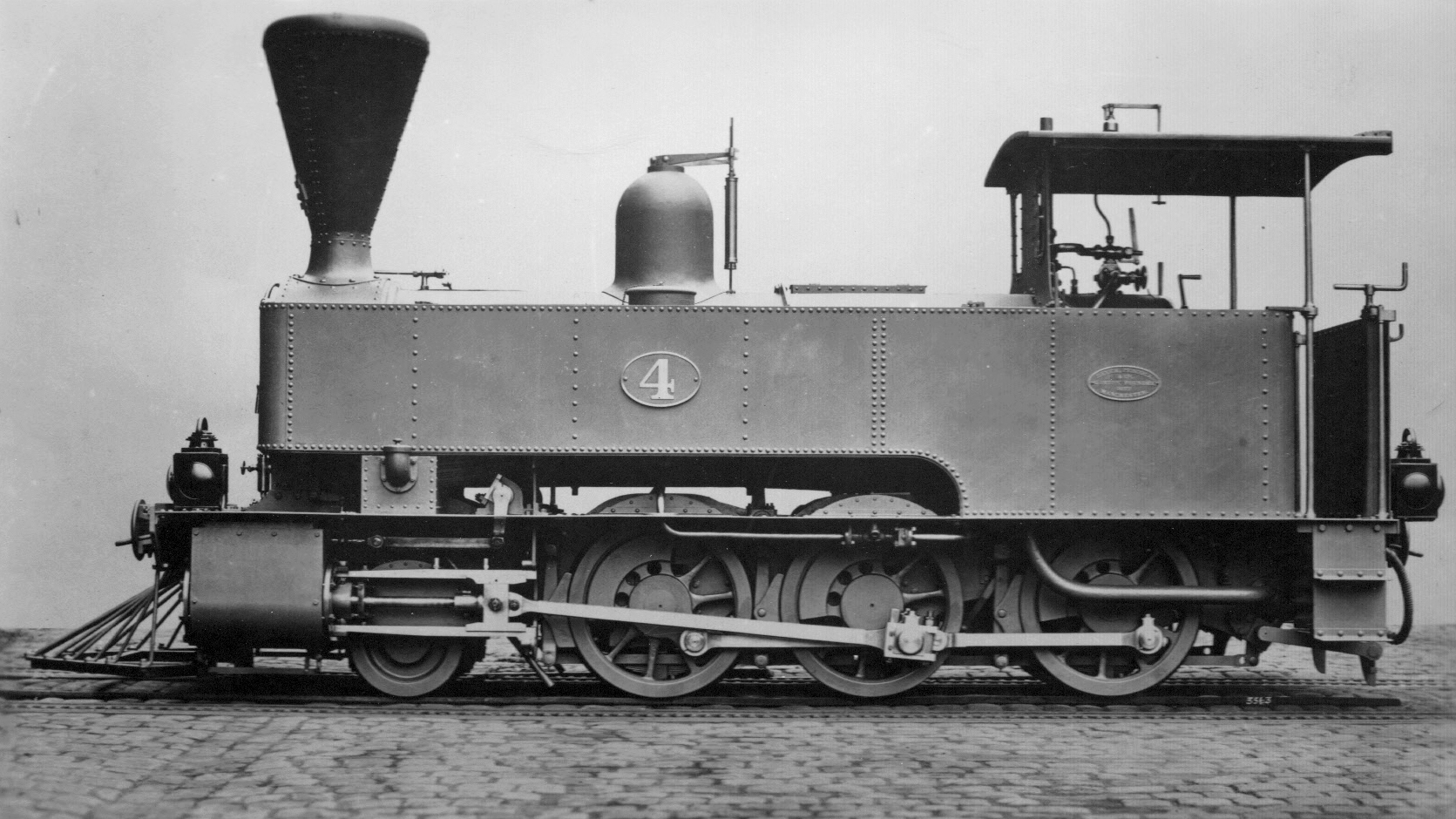
NGR Class K 2-6-0T

- 1 May – Cape Eastern – Breidbach to King William's Town, 3 miles 5 chains (4.9 kilometres).
- 1 May – Cape Eastern – Breidbach to Kei Road, 14 miles 29 chains (23.1 kilometres).
- 1 May – Cape Midland – Uitenhage to Glenconnor, 43 miles 20 chains (69.6 kilometres).
- 27 August – Cape Midland – Sand Flats to Alicedale, 17 miles 37 chains (28.1 kilometres).
- 7 November – Cape Western – Worcester to Kleinstraat, 42 miles 6 chains (67.7 kilometres).
- 12 November – Cape Western – Kraaifontein to Malmesbury, 29 miles 33 chains (47.3 kilometres).

=== Locomotives ===
- In February and March Whythes & Jackson Limited, contracted by the Natal government for the construction of the line from Durban to Pietermaritzburg, takes delivery of two construction locomotives appropriately named Durban and Pietermaritzburg.
- The first five of seven Class K 2-6-0 tank locomotives enter service on the new 3 ft 6 in (1,067 mm) Cape gauge line of the Natal Government Railways that is being built inland from Durban to Pietermaritzburg.
