= 1874 in South Africa =

- Decades: 1850s; 1860s; 1870s; 1880s; 1890s
- See also: List of years in South Africa

The following lists events that happened during 1874 in South Africa.

== Incumbents ==
- Governor of the Cape of Good Hope and High Commissioner for Southern Africa: Sir Henry Barkly.
- Lieutenant-governor of the Colony of Natal: Sir Benjamin Pine.
- State President of the Orange Free State: Jan Brand.
- State President of the South African Republic: Thomas François Burgers.
- Lieutenant-Governor of Griqualand West: Sir Richard Southey.
- Prime Minister of the Cape of Good Hope: Sir John Molteno.

== Events ==
May

- 27 – The first group of Dorsland Trekkers departs from Pretoria to settle in Angola, led by Gert Alberts.

Unknown date

- Work begins on the Cape Parliamentary buildings (the current South African houses of Parliament).
- The Cape Government passes legislation to begin government funding of education and colleges.
- The South African Teachers' Association is established in the Cape.
- The railway line from Port Elizabeth to Uitenhage is partially opened.
- Work is begun on the Verlatenkloof pass, connecting the town of Sutherland with the southern Cape.
- The Molteno Government of the Cape passes a parliamentary act to redraw the provincial boundaries of the Cape Colony, from two provinces (Eastern and Western Cape) to seven.
- The Molteno Regulations establish the South African public library system.
- The Burgerspond, the South African Republic's first coin, is introduced.

== Births ==
- 4 July? – Moloko Temo, South African supercentenarian. (d. 2009)

== Railways ==
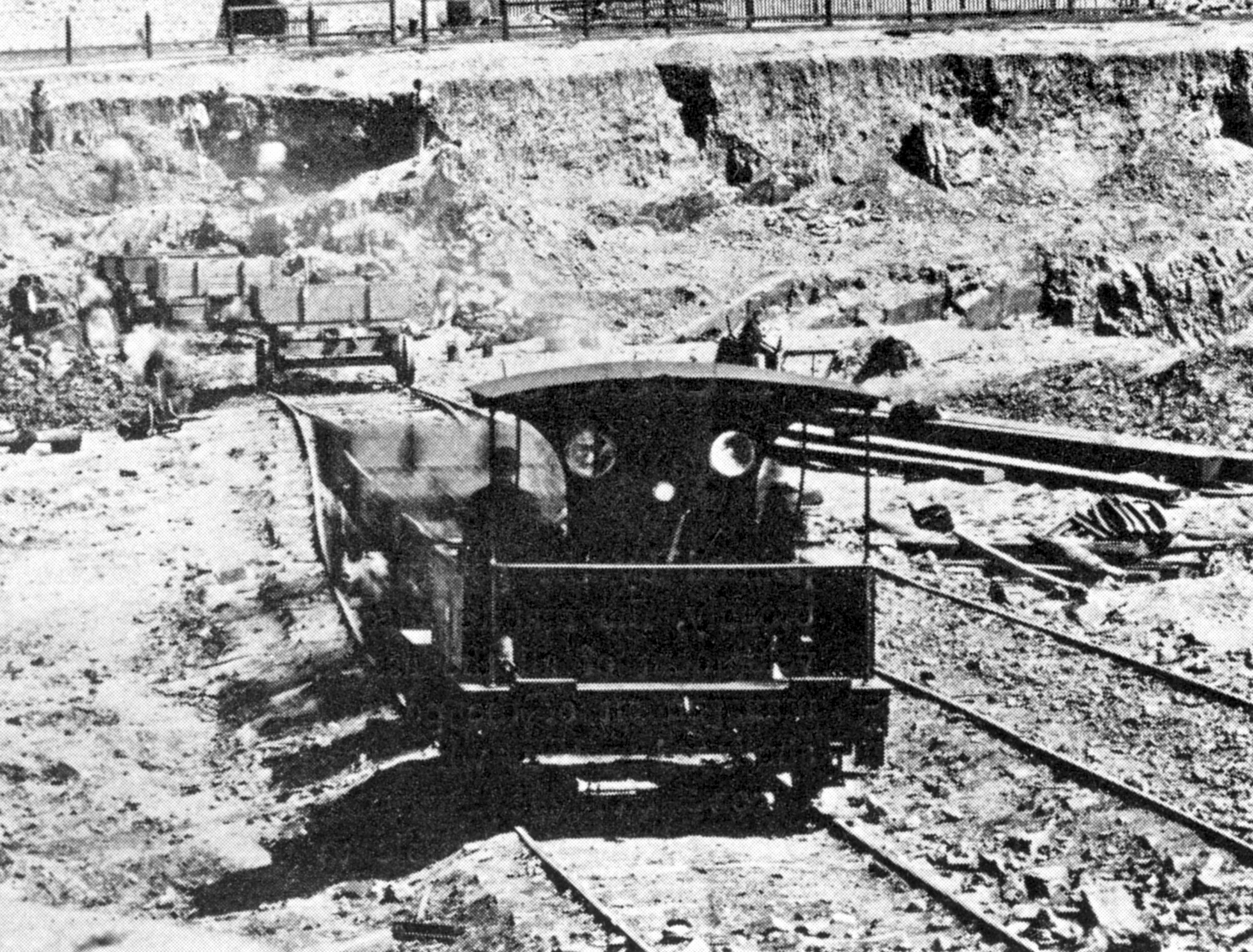
Table Bay Harbour Board 0-4-0T

=== Locomotives ===
- A single 3 ft 6 in (1,067 mm) Cape gauge 0-4-0 saddle-tank locomotive is placed in railway construction service on the Midland System of the Cape Government Railways.
- A third locomotive enters service on breakwater construction work at Table Bay Harbour, a 7 ft 1/4 in (2,140 mm) Brunel gauge 0-4-0 side-tank engine built by Fletcher, Jennings & Co.
