= CGR 1st Class 2-6-0 1879 =

Class of South African locomotives

CGR 1st Class 2-6-0 1879 OVGS 2nd Class 2-6-0 South African Class 01 2-6-0 1879
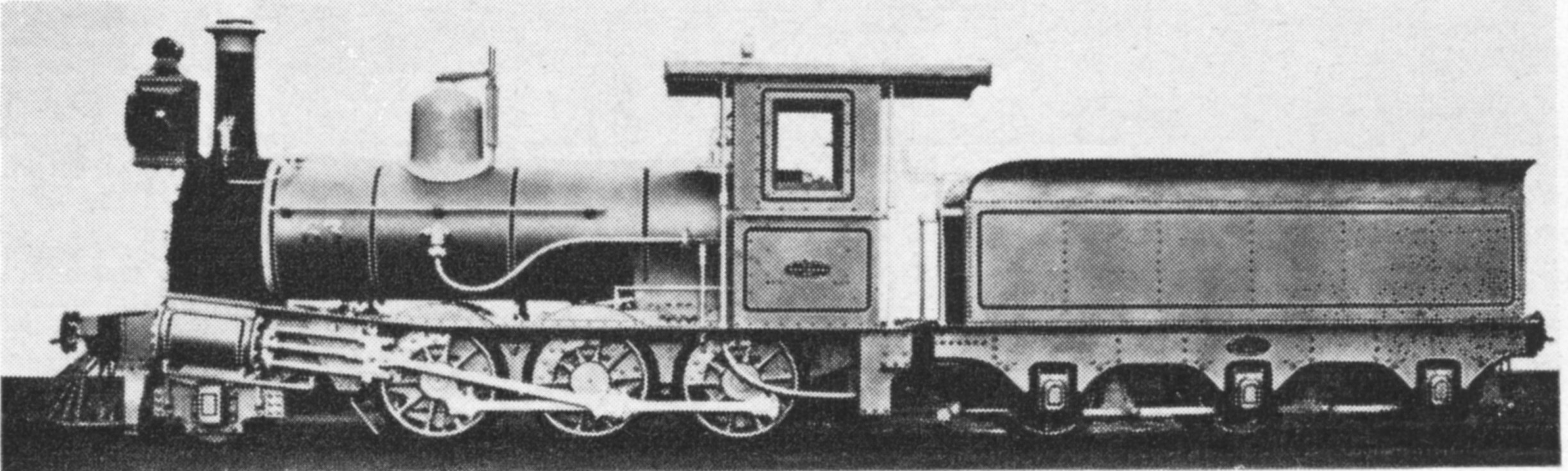
- 1st Class 2-6-0 with inclined cylinders
Type and origin
- Power type: Steam
- Designer: Beyer, Peacock & Company
- Builder: Beyer, Peacock & Company
- Serial number: 1844–1849, 2026–2027, 2039–2040
- Build date: 1879–1880
- Total produced: 10
Specifications
- Configuration
  - Whyte: 2-6-0 (Mogul)
- Driver: 2nd coupled axle
- Gauge: 3 ft 6 in (1,067 mm) Cape gauge
- Leading dia.: 24 in (610 mm)
- Coupled dia.: 39 in (991 mm)
- Tender wheels: 33 in (838 mm)
- Wheelbase: 28 ft 7 in (8,712 mm)
  - Engine: 13 ft (3,962 mm)
  - Coupled: 7 ft 6 in (2,286 mm)
  - Tender: 8 ft (2,438 mm)
- Length
  - Over couplers: 35 ft 6 in (10,820 mm)
- Height: 11 ft (3,353 mm)
- Axle load: 5 LT 13 cwt 2 qtr (5,766 kg)
  - Leading: 4 LT 4 cwt 2 qtr (4,293 kg)
  - 1st coupled: 5 LT 6 cwt 2 qtr (5,410 kg)
  - 2nd coupled: 5 LT 13 cwt 2 qtr (5,766 kg)
  - 3rd coupled: 5 LT 1 cwt 1 qtr (5,144 kg)
- Adhesive weight: 16 LT 1 cwt 1 qtr (16,320 kg)
- Loco weight: 20 LT 5 cwt 3 qtr (20,610 kg)
- Tender weight: 17 LT 17 cwt (18,140 kg)
- Total weight: 38 LT 2 cwt 3 qtr (38,750 kg)
- Tender type: 3-axle
- Fuel type: Coal
- Fuel capacity: 2 LT 10 cwt (2.5 t)
- Water cap.: 1,700 imp gal (7,730 L)
- Firebox
  - Type: Round-top
  - Grate area: 9 1/2 sq ft (0.88 m^{2})
- Boiler
  - Pitch: 5 ft 6 in (1,676 mm)
  - Tube plates: 9 ft 6 3/4 in (2,915 mm)
  - Small tubes: 116: 1 3/4 in (44 mm)
- Boiler pressure: 130 psi (896 kPa)
- Safety valve: Salter
- Heating surface
  - Firebox: 44 sq ft (4.1 m^{2})
  - Tubes: 501 sq ft (46.5 m^{2})
  - Total surface: 545 sq ft (50.6 m^{2})
- Cylinders: Two
- Cylinder size: 12 in (305 mm) bore 20 in (508 mm) stroke
- Valve gear: Stephenson
- Couplers: Johnston link-and-pin
Performance figures
- Tractive effort: 7,200 lbf (32 kN) @ 75%
Career
- Operators: Cape Government Railways; Oranje-Vrijstaat Gouwerment-Spoorwegen; South African Railways
- Class: CGR 1st Class, SAR Class 01
- Number in class: 10
- Numbers: W27-W32, W39-W42
- Delivered: 1879–1880
- First run: 1879
- Disposition: all scrapped

The Cape Government Railways 1st Class 2-6-0 of 1879 was a South African steam locomotive from the pre-Union era in the Cape of Good Hope.

In 1879 and 1880, the Cape Government Railways placed ten 2-6-0 Mogul type locomotives, built by Beyer, Peacock & Company, in freight service on the Cape Western system. They were designated 1st Class when a classification system was adopted.

== Manufacturer ==
Six 2-6-0 Mogul type tender goods locomotives were delivered to the Cape Government Railways (CGR) by Beyer, Peacock & Company in 1879, numbered in the range from W27 to W32 for the Western System. Another four were delivered the following year, numbered in the range from W39 to W42. Like the Beyer, Peacock and Avonside locomotives of 1876 and the pre-modification Kitson locomotives of 1876, they were equipped with six-wheeled tenders.

== Characteristics ==
While they were similar in appearance to the Beyer, Peacock and Avonside locomotives of 1876, there were some major differences. The steam dome was located further forward from the cab, similar to that of the Kitson locomotives. The leading wheels were located much further forward from the coupled wheels, at a 5 feet 6 inches (1,676 millimetres) wheelbase distance from the leading coupled wheel, compared to the 3 feet 7 inches (1,092 millimetres) distance on the Beyer, Peacock and Avonside locomotives of 1876.

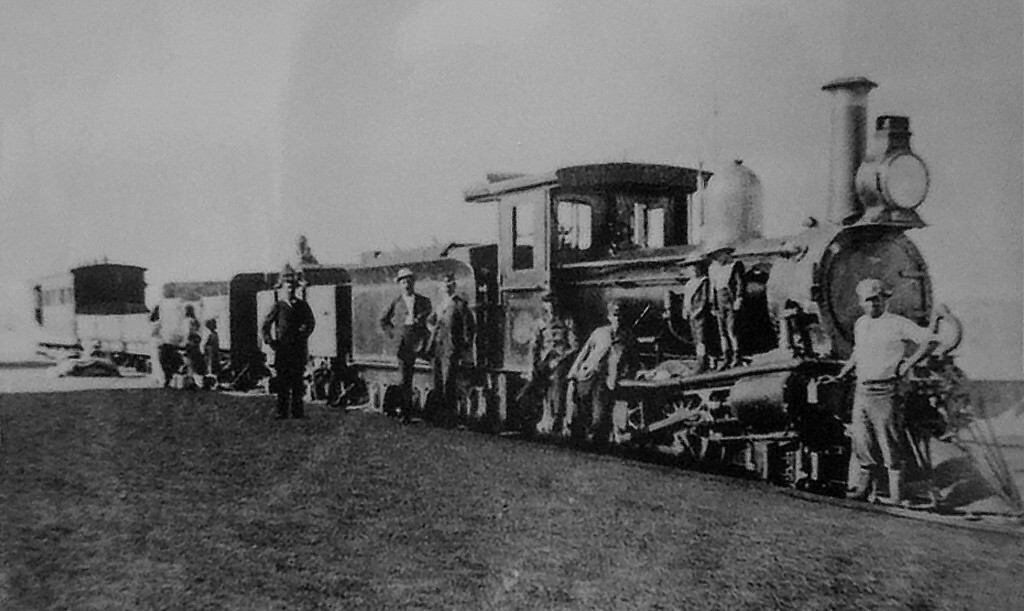
Inclined cylinders and running boards

In addition, the cylinders were mounted at a downward inclination towards the driving wheelset. The part of the running boards directly above the cylinders and valve gear and even the smokebox front were also inclined to the same degree, which gave the locomotive its most obvious distinguishing features.

While they were also acquired as goods locomotives, they were used on all kinds of traffic. All these locomotives were later designated 1st Class when a locomotive classification system was introduced by the CGR.

== Service ==
=== Cape Government Railways ===
At the time these locomotives entered service in 1879, the Western System mainline from Cape Town was completed to Montagu Road, which had been reached in 1877, and work on the section to Beaufort West was completed as far as Fraserburg Road. They saw service on all parts of the Western system, working out of Cape Town deeper into the Karoo as the line was being extended. The line was opened to Beaufort West on 5 February 1880 and the connection with the Midland System was made at De Aar on 31 March 1884.

In 1885, one of these locomotives was the first to enter Kimberley with a passenger train. One of them had the same honour in Bloemfontein in 1889.

=== Oranje-Vrijstaat Gouwerment-Spoorwegen ===
Towards the end of 1896, four of these locomotives were sold to the Oranje-Vrijstaat Gouwerment-Spoorwegen (OVGS), where they were designated 2nd Class. None of these four survived to be taken onto the South African Railways (SAR) roster in 1912.

=== South African Railways ===
When the Union of South Africa was established on 31 May 1910, the three Colonial government railways (CGR, Natal Government Railways and Central South African Railways) were united under a single administration to control and administer the railways, ports and harbours of the Union. Even though the South African Railways and Harbours came into existence in 1910, the actual classification and renumbering of all the rolling stock of the three constituent railways was only implemented with effect from 1 January 1912.

Only no. 40 was still in CGR service to be taken onto the SAR roster in 1912. It was considered obsolete by the SAR, designated Class 01 and renumbered by having the numeral "0" prefixed to its number. By 1918 it was withdrawn from service.

== Renumbering ==
All these locomotives were renumbered at times during the CGR era. By 1886 the system prefixes had been done away with and, by 1888, the first six locomotives were renumbered in the range from 43 to 48. The works numbers, years in service, original numbers, renumbering and disposition of the Cape 1st Class Moguls of 1879 are listed in the table.

CGR 1st Class 2-6-0 of 1879
Works no.	Year	Orig. no.	1888 no.	1899 no.	SAR no.
1844	1879	W27	43	43	
1845	1879	W28	44	44	
1846	1879	W29	45	OVGS	
1847	1879	W30	46	46	
1848	1879	W31	47	47	
1849	1879	W32	48	OVGS	
2026	1880	W39	39	OVGS	
2027	1880	W40	40	40	040
2039	1880	W41	41	OVGS	
2040	1880	W42	42	42	

== Nyasaland Railways myth ==
In his book Steam Locomotives of the South African Railways, Volume 1: 1859-1910, D.F. Holland states that four of these locomotives, numbers W27, W28, W30 and W31, by that time renumbered to 43, 44, 46 and 47 respectively, were sold to the Nyasaland Railways at some stage between 1904 and 1912.

No such sale took place, however. The early locomotives in Nyasaland are well documented and no reference exists to locomotives obtained from the CGR. The first railway in Nyasaland was the Shire Highlands Railway (SHR), on which construction began in 1904 and which was opened in 1908. The second railway was the Central African Railway (CAR), on which Pauling & Company began construction in 1913. Nyasaland Railways was only formed in 1930 to amalgamate the SHR and CAR.
