= 1875 in South Africa =

- Decades: 1850s; 1860s; 1870s; 1880s; 1890s
- See also: List of years in South Africa

The following lists events that happened during 1875 in South Africa.

== Incumbents ==
- Governor of the Cape of Good Hope and High Commissioner for Southern Africa: Henry Barkly.
- Lieutenant-governor of the Colony of Natal: Henry Ernest Gascoyne Bulwer.
- State President of the Orange Free State: Jan Brand.
- State President of the South African Republic: Thomas François Burgers.
- Lieutenant-Governor of Griqualand West: Richard Southey (until 3 August) William Owen Lanyon (until 3 August).
- Prime Minister of the Cape of Good Hope: John Charles Molteno.

== Events ==
May

- John Garlick started his first store on 3 May 1875, on the corner Bree and Strand Streets, in the central business district of Cape Town. This would later become Garlicks, a nationwide chain of department stores.

August

- 14 – The Genootskap van Regte Afrikaners (Association of True Afrikaners) is formed at the home of Gideon Malherbe in Paarl.

Unknown date

- The Black Flag Rebellion is staged by white diamond diggers at Kimberley.
- The Molteno Government begins construction of two Midland railway lines from Swartkops in Port Elizabeth and from Uitenhage.
- The Verlatenskloof pass in the Roggeveld Mountains, begun the previous year, is completed.

== Births ==
- July 7 – Vincent Tancred, cricketer (d. 1904)

== Deaths ==
- 19 May - Christoffel Brand, politician, (b. 1797)

== Railways ==
=== New lines ===
- Construction begins on the Swartkops-Alicedale line.

=== Railway lines opened ===
- 11 May – Cape Western – Cape Town Docks to junction with mainline, 7 miles 1 chain (11.3 kilometres).
- 26 July – Cape Midland – Port Elizabeth to Addo, 31 miles 55 chains (51.0 kilometres).
- 22 September – Cape Midland – Swartkops to Uitenhage, 13 miles 46 chains (21.8 kilometres).
- 3 November – Cape Western – Wellington to Ceres Road, 39 miles 50 chains (63.8 kilometres).

=== Locomotives ===
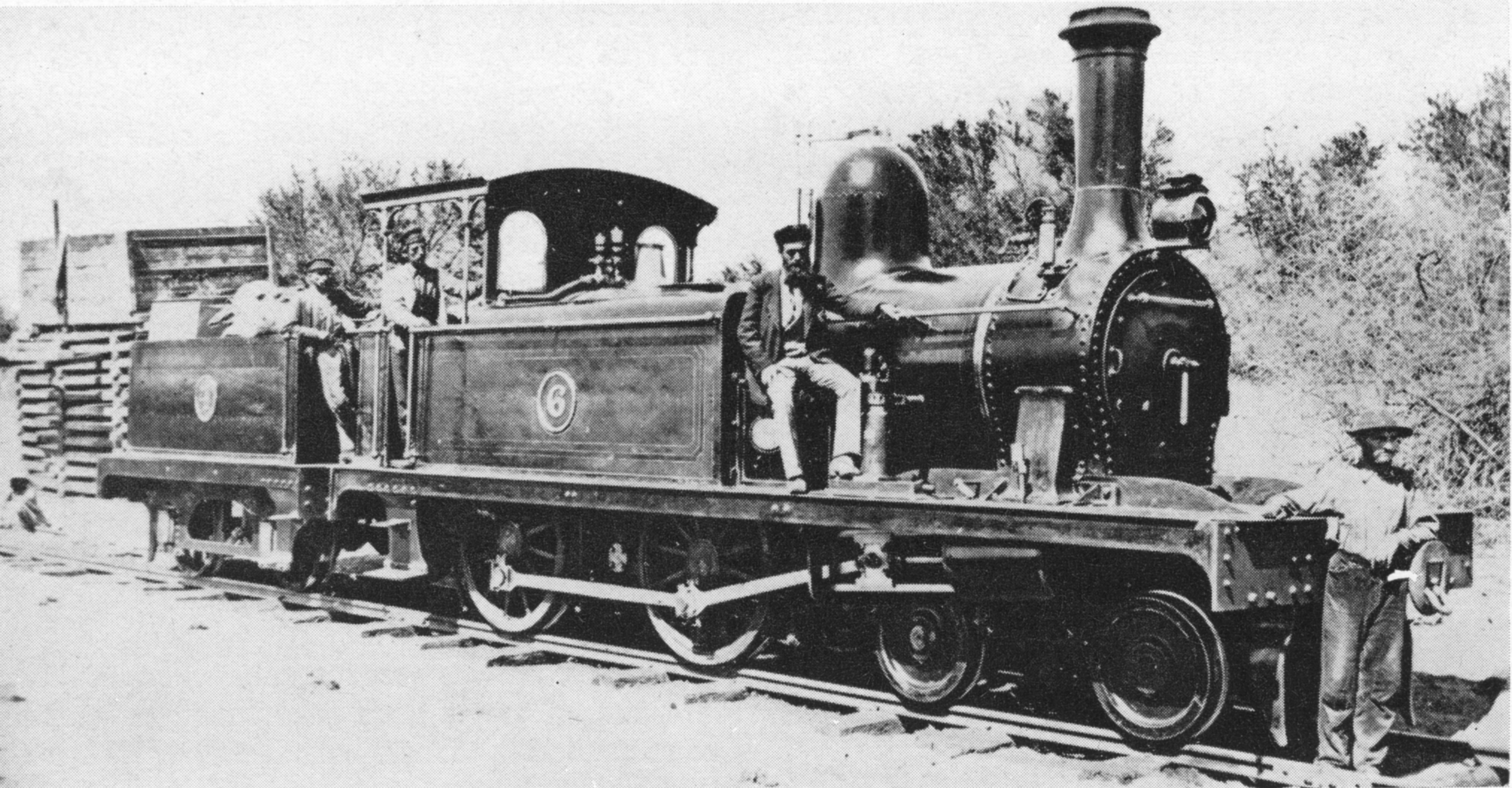
CGR 1st Class 4-4-0T of 1875

Three new 3 ft 6 in (1,067 mm) Cape gauge locomotive types enter service on the Cape Government Railways (CGR):

- The first eight of twenty-seven 2nd Class 2-6-2 tank-and-tender locomotives on all three newly established regional systems, the Eastern System from East London, the Midland System from Port Elizabeth and the Western System from Cape Town.
- Three 1st Class 0-4-0 saddle-tank locomotives on the Midland and Eastern Systems.
- The first seven of eleven 1st Class 4-4-0 tank locomotives on the Western and Midland systems.
