= CGR 0-4-0ST 1873 =

South African locomotive

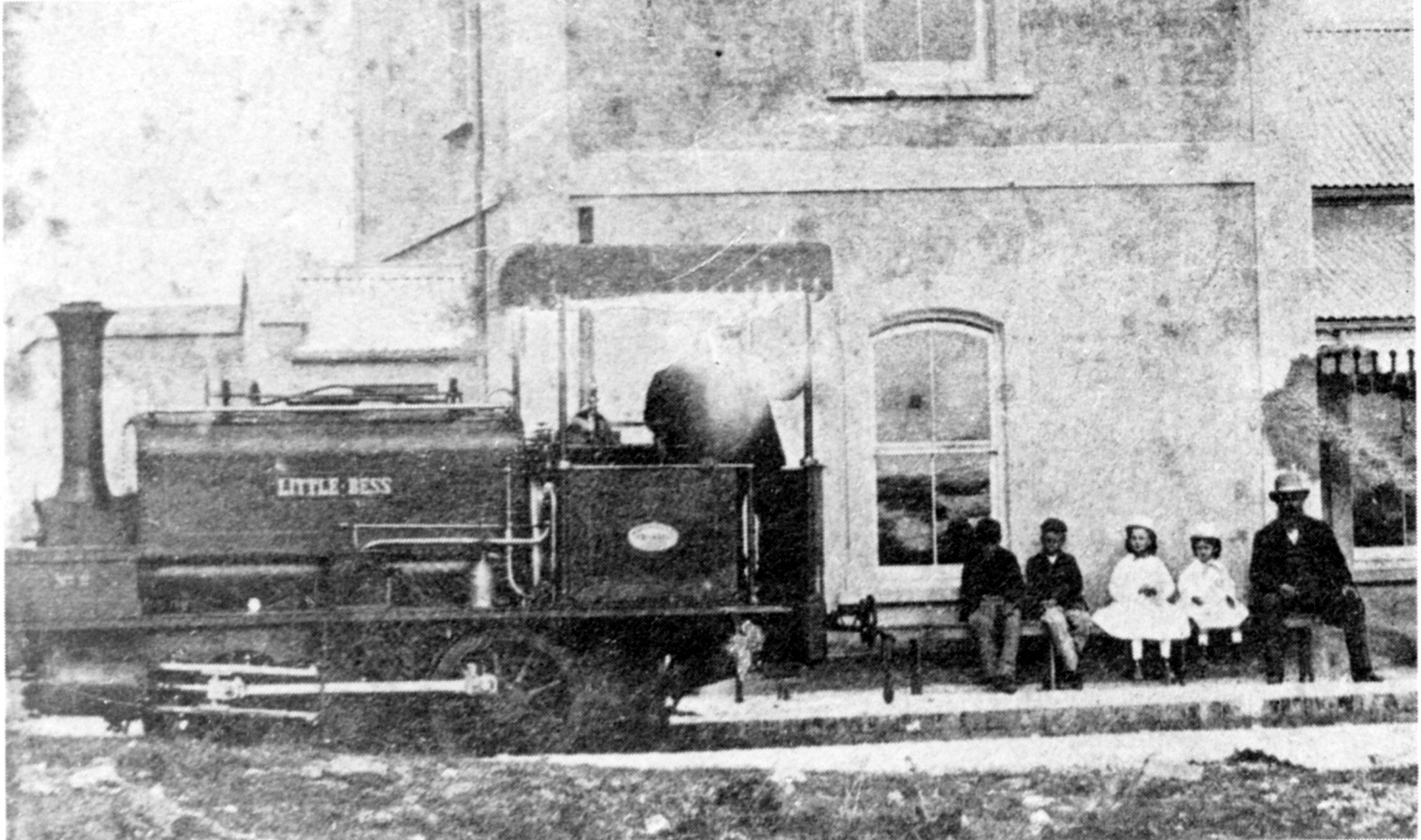
- CGR 0-4-0ST of 1873, no. M2 Little Bess
Type and origin
- Power type: Steam
- Designer: Manning Wardle & Company
- Builder: Manning Wardle & Company
- Serial number: 434, 442 & 494
- Build date: 1873–1874
Specifications
- Configuration
  - Whyte: 0-4-0ST
  - UIC: Bn2t
- Driver: 2nd coupled axle
- Gauge: 3 ft 6 in (1,067 mm) Cape gauge
- Coupled dia.: 33 3/4 in (857 mm)
- Wheelbase: 4 ft 9 in (1,448 mm)
- Length
  - Over couplers: 18 ft 7 in (5,664 mm)
- Height: 9 ft 3/4 in (2,762 mm) chimney 10 ft (3,048 mm) cab roof
- Adhesive weight: 13 LT 16 cwt (14,020 kg)
- Loco weight: 13 LT 16 cwt (14,020 kg)
- Fuel type: Coal
- Fuel capacity: 5 long hundredweight (0.25 t)
- Water cap.: 250 imp gal (1,140 L)
- Firebox
  - Type: Round-top
  - Grate area: 4.5 sq ft (0.42 m^{2})
- Boiler
  - Pitch: 3 ft 10 in (1,168 mm)
  - Tube plates: 7 ft 3 in (2,210 mm)
- Boiler pressure: 130 psi (896 kPa)
- Heating surface
  - Firebox: 29 sq ft (2.7 m^{2})
  - Tubes: 217.5 sq ft (20.21 m^{2})
  - Total surface: 246.5 sq ft (22.90 m^{2})
- Cylinders: Two
- Cylinder size: 9 in (229 mm) bore 14 in (356 mm) stroke
- Valve gear: Stephenson
- Couplers: Johnston link-and-pin
Performance figures
- Tractive effort: 3,280 lbf (14.6 kN) @ 75%
Career
- Operators: Mac Donald & Company; Cape Government Railways
- Number in class: 3
- Numbers: M1-M2, W46
- Official name: Pioneer & Little Bess (M1 & M2)
- Delivered: 1873–1874
- First run: 1873

The Cape Government Railways 0-4-0ST of 1873 was a South African steam locomotive from the pre-Union era in the Cape of Good Hope.

In 1873, two Cape gauge 0-4-0ST locomotives were placed in construction service by Mac Donald & Company, contractors to the Port Elizabeth and Uitenhage Railway Company. When the contract was completed in 1875, the railway and the locomotives were taken over by the Midland System of the Cape Government Railways. A third locomotive, built to the same design, was delivered to the Western System in Cape Town in 1874. These were the first Cape gauge locomotives to enter service in South Africa.

== Cape railways expansion ==
When the control of railways in the Cape of Good Hope was taken over by the Colonial Government on 1 January 1873 and the Cape Government Railways (CGR) was established with the object of railways expansion, a Select Committee was appointed to study the question of track gauge. The choice which had to be made was between the existing Standard gauge of 4 ft 8 1/2 in (1,435 mm) and the narrower gauge of 2 ft 6 in (762 mm), which would effect savings of up to one-third on construction cost.

The CGR Chief Railway Engineer William George Brounger was opposed to the adoption of a narrower gauge on the grounds that, while initial cost would be less, operating costs would be higher. The narrow gauge had been proposed by civil engineer R. Thomas Hall, Superintendent of the narrow gauge Redruth and Chacewater Railway in Cornwall, who was involved in the construction, beginning in 1869, of the Namaqualand Railway which was being built to that gauge between Port Nolloth and O'okiep for the Cape Copper Mining Company. The committee, with a three-to-one vote, settled on a compromise between the two recommended gauges and the 3 feet 6 inches (1,067 millimetres) Cape gauge came into existence in Southern Africa.

== Manufacturer ==
The first three locomotives for the new Cape gauge lines were built by Manning Wardle & Company in 1873 and 1874. The first two, ex works on 12 March and 3 May 1873 respectively, were delivered in 1873 to Mac Donald & Company, contractors to the Port Elizabeth and Uitenhage Railway Company in Port Elizabeth. The contractors named them Pioneer and Little Bess respectively.

The third locomotive, ex works on 6 February 1874, was delivered to the Western System in Cape Town in 1874 and was numbered W46 in the Western's number range.

== Johnston link-and-pin coupler ==
From the arrival of the first railway locomotive in South Africa, the Cape Town Railway & Dock 0-4-0T of 1859, all railway rolling stock had been equipped with buffers-and-chain coupling, variations of which are still in use in the United Kingdom and Europe.

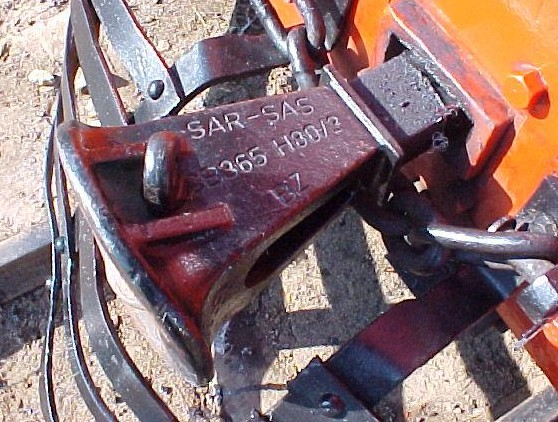
Johnston link-and-pin coupler

These locomotives of 1873 introduced the bell-shaped Johnston link-and-pin coupler, commonly known as a bell link-and-pin coupler, which was to become the standard coupler on Cape gauge rolling stock in the Cape of Good Hope, the Colony of Natal and the Zuid-Afrikaansche Republiek. In South Africa, all new Cape gauge locomotives and rolling stock acquired between 1873 and 1927 were equipped with these or similar couplers.

== Cape Midland System ==
By 1872, Port Elizabeth already possessed extensive Standard gauge trackage between the harbour and Swartkops, but trains were still animal-hauled. Work by contractors Mac Donald's on railway expansion from Port Elizabeth into the interior commenced in June 1872. The two locomotives which were delivered to them in 1873 were utilised as construction engines.

The first train ran as far as Sydenham in October 1873, and 11 miles (18 kilometres) of railway was completed by 1874. When the two new lines were opened in 1875, northwestward to Uitenhage and northward from Swartkops to Barkly Bridge, the lines and the construction locomotives were taken over by the CGR and the locomotives were numbered M1 and M2 for the Midland System. These two locomotives, together with a smaller 0-4-0ST engine named Mliss which joined them on construction work in 1874, are considered the pioneers of locomotives over the greater part of the Midland System.

== Cape Western System ==
By 1874, when the third of the first three locomotives, no. W46, was delivered to the Western System, construction work was proceeding in two directions from Wellington. New Cape gauge track was being laid deeper into the interior towards Worcester, while track dual-gauging was being undertaken back from Wellington towards Cape Town.
