= CGR 0-4-0ST 1878 Aid =

Class of 1 South African 0-4-0ST locomotive

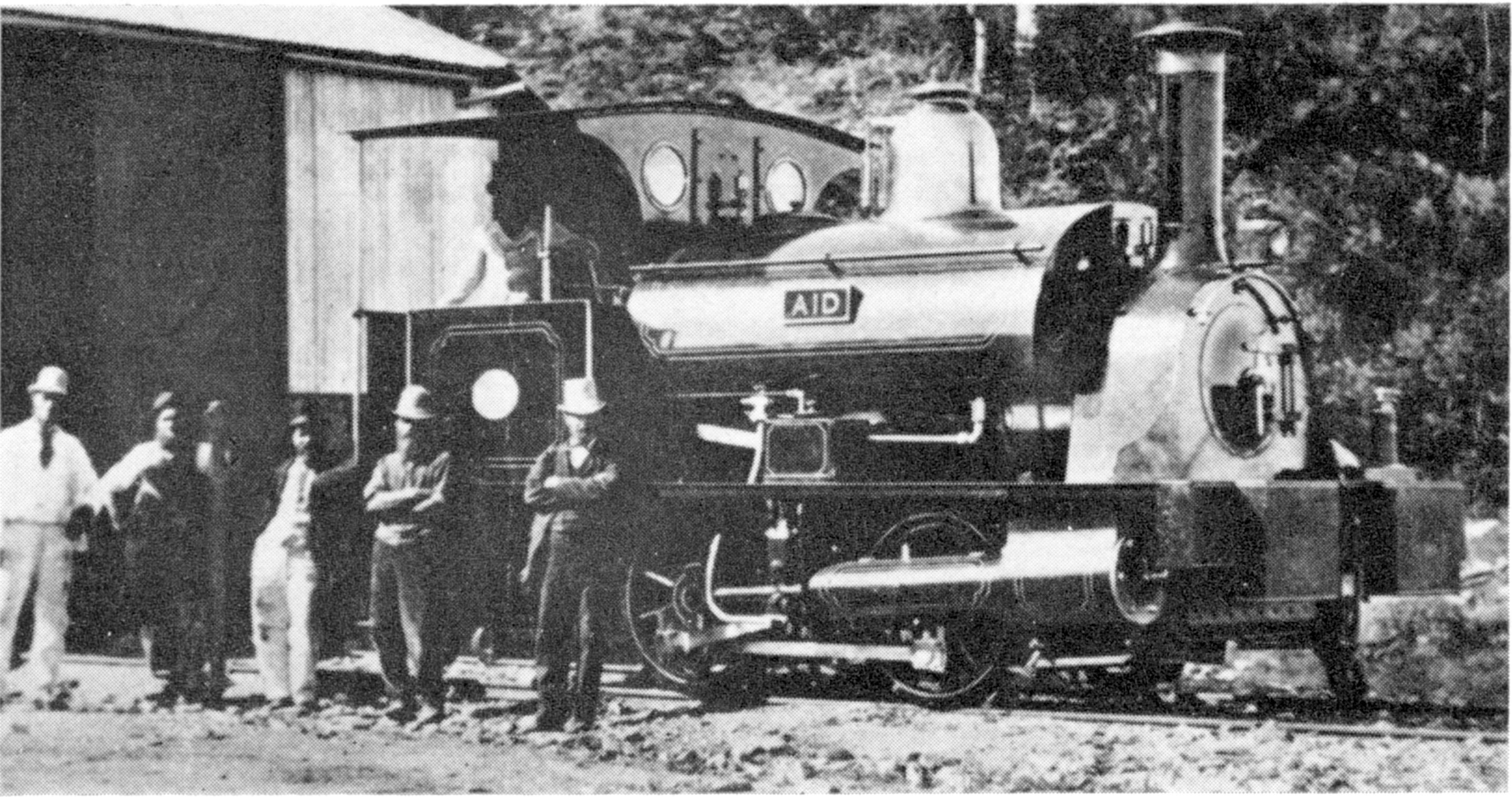
- The locomotive Aid at Port Alfred
Type and origin
- Power type: Steam
- Designer: Fox, Walker and Company
- Builder: Fox, Walker and Company
- Serial number: 325
- Build date: 1877
Specifications
- Configuration
  - Whyte: 0-4-0ST
  - UIC: Bn2t
- Driver: 2nd coupled axle
- Gauge: 4 ft 8 1/2 in (1,435 mm) standard gauge "broad" in comparison to the traditional 3 ft 6 in (1,067 mm) Cape gauge
- Coupled dia.: 37 1/2 in (952 mm)
- Wheelbase: 4 ft 9 in (1,448 mm)
  - Coupled: 4 ft 9 in (1,448 mm)
- Length
  - Over couplers: 18 ft (5,486 mm) over buffers
  - Over beams: 16 ft (4,877 mm)
- Height: 10 ft 6 in (3,200 mm)
- Fuel type: Coal
- Fuel capacity: 1 LT 10 cwt (1.5 t)
- Water cap.: 450 imp gal (2,050 L)
- Firebox
  - Type: Round-top
  - Grate area: 5.5 sq ft (0.51 m^{2})
- Boiler
  - Pitch: 4 ft 11 3/4 in (1,518 mm)
  - Diameter: 2 ft 7 1/2 in (800 mm)
  - Tube plates: 7 ft 9 3/16 in (2,367 mm)
  - Small tubes: 69: 2 in (51 mm)
- Boiler pressure: 130 psi (896 kPa)
- Safety valve: Salter
- Heating surface
  - Firebox: 34.16 sq ft (3.174 m^{2})
  - Tubes: 281.56 sq ft (26.158 m^{2})
  - Total surface: 315.72 sq ft (29.331 m^{2})
- Cylinders: Two
- Cylinder size: 10 in (254 mm) bore 18 in (457 mm) stroke
- Valve gear: Stephenson
- Couplers: Buffers-and-chain
Performance figures
- Tractive effort: 4,680 lbf (20.8 kN) @ 75%
Career
- Operators: Cape Government Railways
- Number in class: 1
- Official name: Aid
- Delivered: 1878
- First run: 1878

The Cape Government Railways 0-4-0ST Aid of 1878 was a South African steam locomotive from the pre-Union era in the Cape of Good Hope.

In June 1874, while construction work by the Kowie Harbour Improvement Company was underway at Port Alfred, the Cape Government Railways shipped their 0-4-0T locomotive no. 9 Blackie from Cape Town to Port Alfred for use as construction locomotive. In 1878, when it became necessary to regularly ferry the locomotive from one bank of the Kowie River to the other, a second locomotive was obtained, a 0-4-0ST engine named Aid.

== Port Alfred harbour ==
In the middle of the 19th century, Port Alfred at the Kowie River mouth was considered as a possible third major port in the Eastern Cape, in addition to the ports of Port Elizabeth to the southwest and East London to the northeast. In 1857, the Kowie Harbour Improvement Company commenced work to construct embankments and increase the depth of the river mouth. The work was eventually taken over by the Cape Government, who spent more than £800,000 in the attempt to develop the harbour.

In 1874, when the need arose for a construction locomotive on site, the 0-4-2T locomotive no. 9 Blackie, the first locomotive in South Africa, was shipped to Port Alfred by the Cape Government Railways. The engine Blackie, officially named Frontier, was put to work on the west bank of the Kowie river, but as pressure of work demanded, it became necessary to regularly ferry the locomotive from one bank of the Kowie to the other.

== Manufacturer ==
To eliminate the time-consuming tedium of ferrying the locomotive to and fro across the river, an order for a second locomotive was placed through the Crown Agents for the Colonies in 1877. Fox, Walker and Company of Bristol in England supplied an 0-4-0ST locomotive which was shipped in two sections and on two brigs, the Frieda and the Lena, which arrived at Port Alfred on 1 January 1878.

== Service ==
The new locomotive, also built for 4 ft 8 1/2 in (1,435 mm) gauge, was assembled on the east bank of the Kowie and named Aid. It worked at Port Alfred until the harbour construction work was terminated around the turn of the twentieth century, as a result of the continuous silting up of the river mouth which made the project unviable. The engine Aid was then abandoned and left standing in a shed.

== Disposal ==
At some time shortly after the end of the First World War, the engine Aid was stripped down and buried on site. Its remains were exhumed in January 1960 and presented to the museum at Port Elizabeth, where it was intended to rebuild the locomotive to a condition suitable for static exhibition, using dimensional drawings of the engine which had since been discovered.

Nothing came of the restoration plans, however, and the exhumed remains of the locomotive were eventually sold as scrap metal.
