= CGR 0-4-0ST 1874 =

Class of 1 South African 0-4-0T locomotive

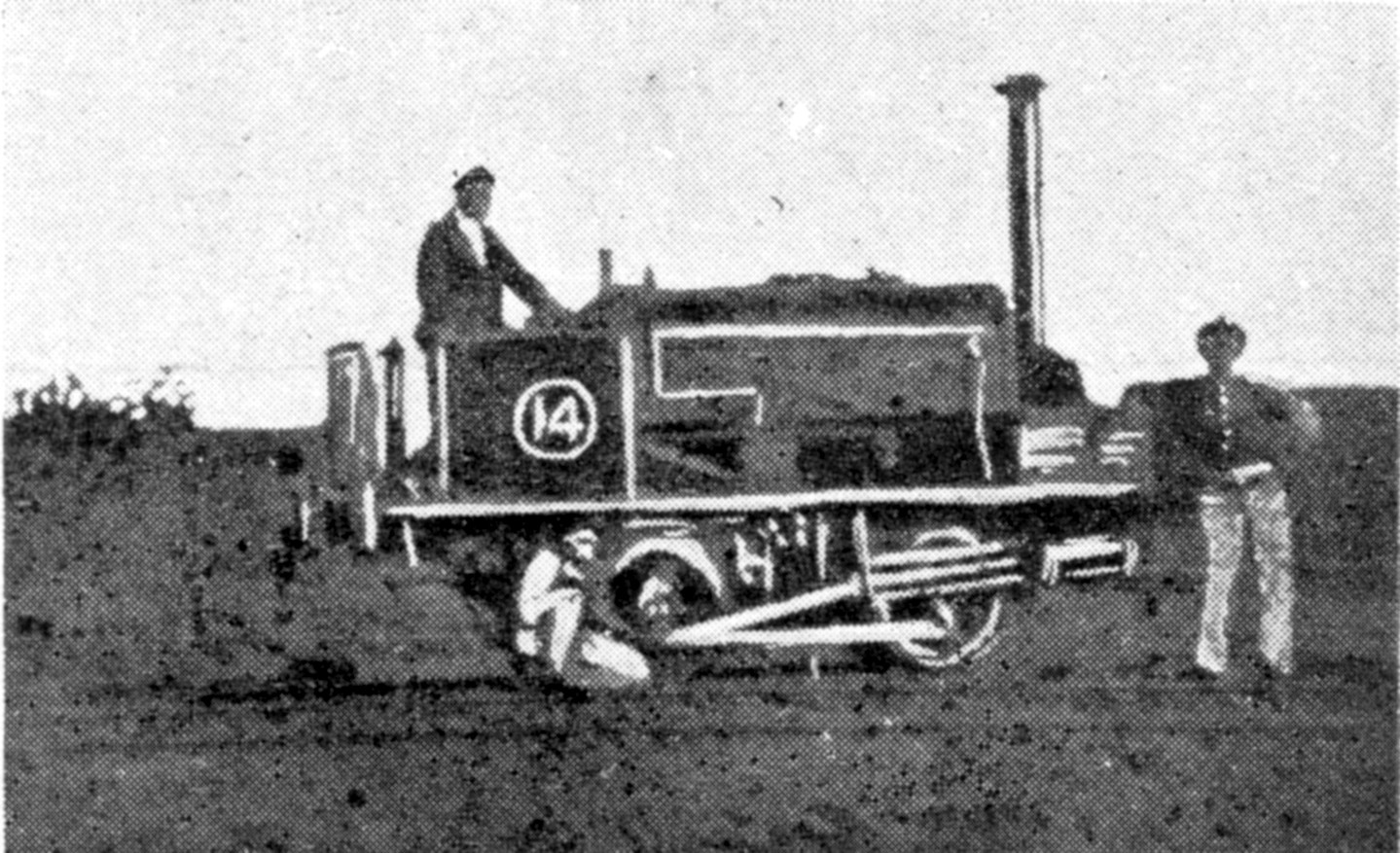
- CGR 0-4-0ST of 1874, no. M14
Type and origin
- Power type: Steam
- Designer: Manning Wardle & Company
- Builder: Manning Wardle & Company
- Serial number: 483
- Model: MW Class B
- Build date: Ex works 10 March 1874
Specifications
- Configuration
  - Whyte: 0-4-0ST
  - UIC: Bn2t
- Driver: 2nd coupled axle
- Gauge: 3 ft 6 in (1,067 mm) Cape gauge
- Coupled dia.: 30 in (762 mm)
- Adhesive weight: 8 LT (8,128 kg)
- Loco weight: 8 LT (8,128 kg)
- Fuel type: Coal
- Firebox
  - Type: Round-top
- Cylinders: Two
- Cylinder size: 7 in (178 mm) bore 12 in (305 mm) stroke
- Valve gear: Stephenson
- Couplers: Johnston link-and-pin
Career
- Operators: Cape Government Railways
- Number in class: 1
- Numbers: M14
- Official name: Possibly Mliss
- Delivered: 1874
- First run: 1874

The Cape Government Railways 0-4-0ST of 1874 was a South African steam locomotive from the pre-Union era in the Cape of Good Hope.

In 1874, a single Cape gauge 0-4-0ST locomotive was placed in service by the contractors to the Port Elizabeth and Uitenhage Railway Company for the construction of railway lines into the interior. When construction work was completed, the locomotive was taken onto the roster of the Midland System of the Cape Government Railways.

== Manufacturer ==
In 1874, a third Cape gauge locomotive was delivered through the London agents W. Bailey Hawkins & Company to the contractors to the Port Elizabeth and Uitenhage Railway Company in Port Elizabeth. The locomotive, built by Manning Wardle & Company and dispatched from the builders on 10 March 1874, was of a smaller design than the earlier two 0-4-0ST locomotives of 1873.

== Characteristics ==
The locomotive was a Manning Wardle Class B engine with 30 inches (762 millimetres) diameter coupled wheels and cylinders with a 7 inches (178 millimetres) bore and 12 inches (305 millimetres) stroke.

== Service ==
Work on railway expansion from Port Elizabeth into the interior was already underway in 1874. The locomotive was put to work as construction engine on the northern mainline which was being built northwards from Swartkops via Barkly Bridge, Addo, Alicedale and Cookhouse to Cradock.

At some stage around April 1876, when construction work was completed to Sandflats between Coerney and Alicedale, the locomotive, along with six other contractor's locomotives, was taken over from the contractors by the Cape Government Railways and numbered M14 on the Midland System. In 1877, when Swallow's Cutting was being excavated near Middleton on the section north of Alicedale, the locomotive was transported to the construction site by government bullock cart. This line reached Cookhouse in 1880.

== Engine Mliss ==
Reference has been made in literature to a locomotive named Mliss. In an Uitenhage centenary publication, the first three construction locomotives on the Midland System are described as two engines named Pioneer and Little Bess which each weighed 14 tons, and a third engine named Mliss after "one of Bret Harte's charming heroines", which was imported at about the same time and which weighed only eight tons.

To date, the engine Mliss could not be positively identified. While no. M14 is the most likely candidate, too little is known as yet about the engine itself to positively identify it as the engine Mliss.

== Drawing ==
Since the only known existing picture of this locomotive is heavily touched up, the drawing by Leith Paxton illustrates better what this locomotive looked like. It was based on the original manufacturer's drawing, obtained from the United Kingdom.

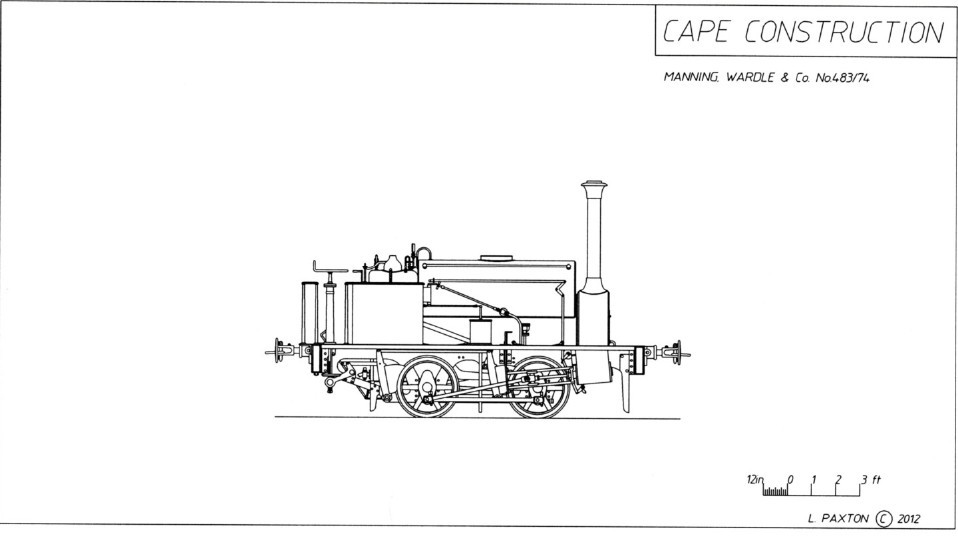
Drawing of Cape Government Railways 0-4-0ST of 1874, no. M14
