= Kei Road =

Kei Road Keiweg
- Location within Eastern Cape Location within South Africa
- Coordinates: 32.702°S 27.559°E
- Country: South Africa
- Province: Eastern Cape
- District: Amathole
- Municipality: Amahlathi

Area
  - Total: 4.57 km^{2} (1.76 sq mi)

Population (2011)
  - Total: 1,179
  - Density: 258/km^{2} (668/sq mi)

Racial makeup (2011)
  - Black African: 99.5%
  - Coloured: 0.2%
  - Indian/Asian: 0.2%
  - Other: 0.2%

First languages (2011)
  - Xhosa: 96.9%
  - Other: 3.1%
- Time zone: UTC+2 (SAST)
- Postal code (street): 4920
- PO box: 4920
- Area code: 043

Kei Road is a town in Amathole District Municipality in the Eastern Cape province of South Africa.

Village 27 km north-east of Qonce and 24 km south-east of Stutterheim. It was so named after its situation on the military road between King William’s Town and the Kei River (Mkwai River) formerly known as Nciba
