= Breidbach =

- Nicknames: Breids, Breidz or Breity
- Location within Eastern Cape Location within South Africa
- Coordinates: 32°53′S 27°26′E
- Country: South Africa
- Province eastern cape: Eastern Cape
- Municipality: Buffalo City

Area
  - Total: 2.49 km^{2} (0.96 sq mi)

Population (2011)
  - Total: 7,767
  - Density: 3,120/km^{2} (8,080/sq mi)

Racial makeup (2011)
  - Black African: 18.2%
  - Coloured: 80.8%
  - Indian/Asian: 0.4%
  - White: 0.3%
  - Other: 0.3%

First languages (2011)
  - Afrikaans: 80.6%
  - Xhosa: 14.0%
  - English: 3.5%
  - Other: 2.0%
- Time zone: UTC+2 (SAST)
- Postal code (street): 5601

Breidbach is a neighborhood in King William's Town in South Africa, situated in the Border region of the Eastern Cape province.

Breidbach was originally established in 1857 as a settlement for members of the British German Legion. The population today consists mostly of Coloureds. The area has many sports enthusiasts (mainly cricket, rugby and soccer) and church-goers.

Breidbach has two schools, a primary school and secondary school, both are double-medium (co-ed). The attractions are: night clubs, sports field, clinic, library, community (civic) centre, butchery and churches.

The Yellowwoods waterfalls in the Yellowwoods River, a tributary of the Buffalo River, is to be found near the town.
