= CGR 1st Class 4-4-0T =

Class of 11 South African 4-4-0T locomotives

CGR 1st Class 4-4-0T Metropolitan & Suburban 4-4-0T South African Class 01 4-4-0T
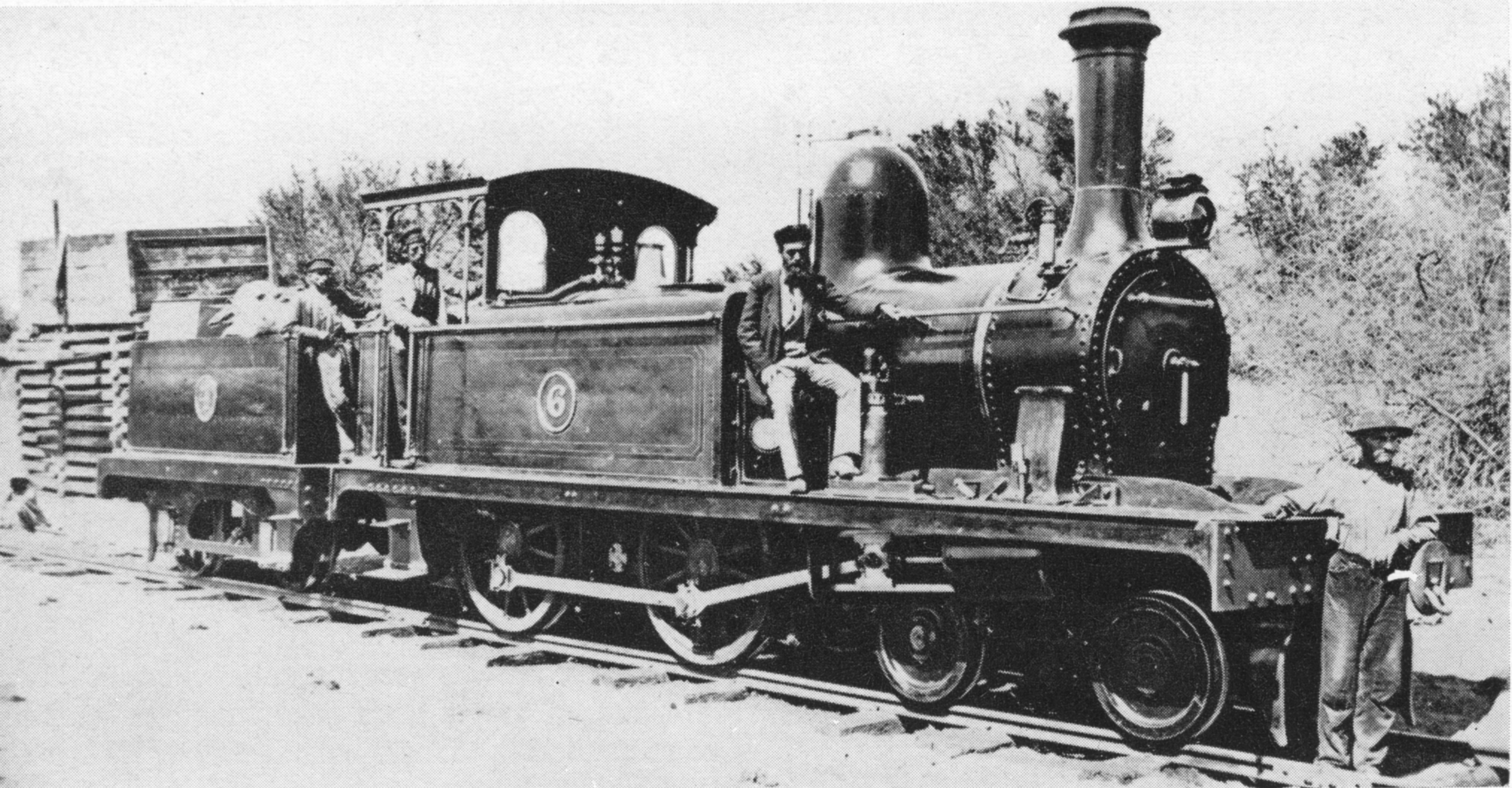
- No. 6 with optional tender no. 4, c. 1880
Type and origin
- Power type: Steam
- Designer: Robert Stephenson and Company
- Builder: Robert Stephenson and Company; Neilson and Company
- Serial number: Stephenson 2224-2230; Neilson 2553-2556
- Build date: 1875-1880
- Total produced: 11
Specifications
- Configuration
  - Whyte: 4-4-0T (American)
  - UIC: 2′Bn2t
- Driver: 1st coupled axle
- Gauge: 3 ft 6 in (1,067 mm) Cape gauge
- Leading dia.: 27 in (686 mm)
- Coupled dia.: 48 in (1,219 mm)
- Wheelbase
  - Engine: 16 ft 9 1/2 in (5,118 mm)
  - Leading: 4 ft 8 in (1,422 mm)
  - Coupled: 6 ft 6 in (1,981 mm)
  - Tender: 4 ft 8 in (1,422 mm)
- Length
  - Over couplers: 26 ft 11 1/2 in (8,217 mm)
- Height: 12 ft (3,658 mm)
- Frame type: Plate
- Axle load: 8 LT 2 cwt (8,230 kg)
  - Leading: 7 LT 0 cwt 3 qtr (7,150 kg)
  - 1st coupled: 7 LT 4 cwt 3 qtr (7,354 kg)
  - 2nd coupled: 8 LT 2 cwt (8,230 kg)
- Adhesive weight: 15 LT 6 cwt 3 qtr (15,580 kg)
- Loco weight: 22 LT 7 cwt 1 qtr (22,720 kg)
- Tender type: 2-axle
- Fuel type: Coal
- Fuel capacity: 15 long hundredweight (0.8 t)
- Water cap.: 450 imp gal (2,050 L)
- Tender cap.: 900 imp gal (4,090 L)
- Firebox
  - Type: Round-top
  - Grate area: 10 sq ft (0.93 m^{2})
- Boiler
  - Pitch: 6 ft (1,829 mm)
  - Tube plates: 9 ft (2,743 mm)
- Boiler pressure: 130 psi (896 kPa)
- Safety valve: Salter
- Heating surface
  - Firebox: 46 sq ft (4.3 m^{2})
  - Tubes: 500 sq ft (46 m^{2})
  - Total surface: 546 sq ft (50.7 m^{2})
- Cylinders: Two
- Cylinder size: 13 in (330 mm) bore 18 in (457 mm) stroke
- Valve gear: Stephenson
- Valve type: Slide
- Couplers: Johnston link-and-pin
Performance figures
- Tractive effort: 6,180 lbf (27.5 kN) @ 75%
Career
- Operators: Cape Government Railways; Metropolitan & Suburban Railway; South African Railways
- Class: CGR 1st Class
- Number in class: 11
- Numbers: W3-W6, M11-M13, M40-M43
- Delivered: 1875-1880
- First run: 1875

The Cape Government Railways 1st Class 4-4-0T of 1875 was a South African steam locomotive from the pre-Union era in the Cape of Good Hope.

In 1875, the Cape Government Railways placed seven tank locomotives with a 4-4-0 American type wheel arrangement in service on its Cape Western and Cape Midland systems. Four more entered service in 1880, but these were delivered as tank-and-tender locomotives with optional water tenders. They were the first Cape gauge mainline engines to enter service in South Africa.

== Manufacturers ==
Seven 4-4-0 side-tank locomotives were built for the Cape Government Railways (CGR) by Robert Stephenson and Company in 1875, numbered in the range from W3 to W6 in the Western System's number range and M11 to M13 in the Midland System's number range.

Since they were found to be fast and reliable engines, four more were delivered in 1880, built by Neilson and Company and numbered in the range from M40 to M43 in the Midland System's number range. They were practically identical to the previous seven, but sported some minor improvements and were built as tank-and-tender locomotives, equipped with small optional four-wheeled water tenders with a capacity of 900 imperial gallons (4,090 litres). They were all designated 1st Class when a locomotive classification system was introduced by the CGR.

== Characteristics ==
The locomotive had a round-topped firebox. The cylinders were inclined and arranged outside the engine frame, while the slide valves were actuated by Stephenson Link motion. The cab sides of the early locomotives were not enclosed, but were equipped with canvas roller blinds to offer the crew some protection against the elements.

The later versions of the locomotive had enclosed cab sides. These engines were slightly longer with larger water tanks and had larger firebox and boiler heating surfaces, with an increased boiler pressure.

== Service ==
=== Cape Government Railways ===
These were the first Cape gauge engines to enter mainline service in South Africa. In service, the locomotives were operated with or without the tenders, as circumstances demanded. In practice, they were used in the tank engine configuration while performing shunting work and in the tank-and-tender configuration when an increased coal and water supply was required while working over longer distances. Since the tender had no coal bunker, bags of additional coal were often carried on top of the tender.

The locomotives worked both passenger and mixed goods trains. They performed fairly well with the original 6 long tons (6.1 tonnes) four-wheeled carriages which were in use while passenger numbers were still limited. With increasing passenger traffic, heavier carriages on bogies were introduced, which led to the locomotives being withdrawn from mainline work and relegated to shunting work, a role in which they remained useful for many years.

=== Metropolitan & Suburban Railway ===
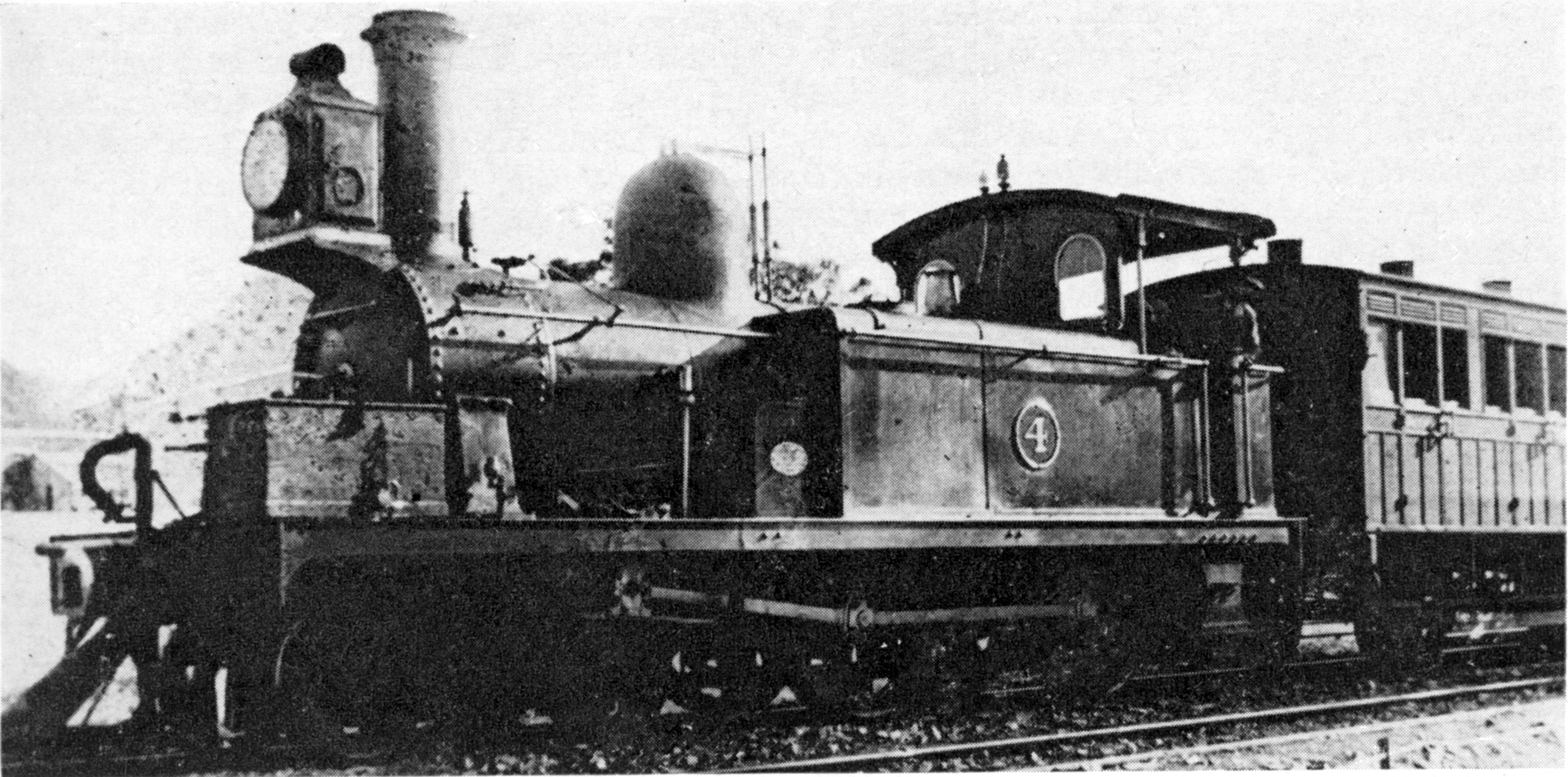
No. 4 on the Metropolitan & Suburban Railway, c. 1892

When the Green and Seapoint Company was established in 1887 with the object to construct a private suburban railway line to Sea Point in Cape Town, two of these locomotives, numbers 3 and 4 (W3 and W4), were acquired from the CGR for use as construction engines.

Following two bankruptcies, the line was eventually opened on 1 September 1892 by a third company, the Metropolitan and Suburban Railway Company, under the chairmanship of Mr. John Walker. The two locomotives were then employed as passenger locomotives. The line was not financially viable, however, and the Metropolitan and Suburban also went into liquidation on 19 July 1898. The railway and its operations were eventually taken over by the Cape government and the Sea Point line was re-opened by the CGR in December 1905.

=== South African Railways ===
When the Union of South Africa was established on 31 May 1910, the three Colonial government railways (CGR, Natal Government Railways and Central South African Railways) were united under a single administration to control and administer the railways, ports and harbours of the Union. Even though the South African Railways and Harbours came into existence in 1910, the actual classification and renumbering of all the rolling stock of the three constituent railways required careful planning and was only implemented with effect from 1 January 1912.

According to some sources, two of these locomotives, one from each batch with numbers 413 and 441 (M13 and M41), were sold to the Nyasaland Railways at some stage. Serious doubt exists, however, that these engines ever went to Nyasaland, since no evidence of such a sale has come to light and since both locomotives are referred to in the South African Railways (SAR) renumbering and classification lists of 1912.

By 1904, five of the locomotives had been scrapped or sold and, by 1912, the only survivors were the two locomotives which had allegedly earlier been sold to Nyasaland and which, at the time, were both found to be rostered at Uitenhage on the Midland system. They were considered obsolete by the SAR and were excluded from the classification schedules, but were renumbered by having the numeral "0" prefixed to their existing numbers.

== Renumbering ==
All these locomotives were renumbered at least once, whenever the CGR adopted a new numbering system. By 1886, the system prefixes had been dropped, with the "W" omitted from the locomotive numbers on the Western System and the "M" replaced by the numeral "1" on the Midland. Further renumbering was applied to the Midland locomotives by 1890 and again by 1896, when first the leading numeral "1" was replaced by the numeral "2" by 1890, and again when the leading numeral "2" was, in turn, replaced by the numeral "4" by 1896.

The builders, works numbers, years built, configuration, original numbers and renumbering of the Cape 1st Class of 1875 are listed in the table.

CGR 1st Class 4-4-0T and 4-4-0TT of 1875
Builder	Works no.	Year built	Config.	Orig. no.	1886 no.	1890 no.	1896 no.	1904 no.	Notes
Stephenson	2224	1875	4-4-0T	W3	3				Sold to M&S 1887
Stephenson	2225	1875	4-4-0T	W4	4				Sold to M&S 1887
Stephenson	2226	1875	4-4-0T	W5	5	5	5		Scrapped 1898
Stephenson	2227	1875	4-4-0T	W6	6	6	6	6	Scrapped by 1911
Stephenson	2228	1875	4-4-0T	M11	111	211	411	411	Scrapped by 1911
Stephenson	2229	1875	4-4-0T	M12	112	212	412	412	Scrapped by 1911
Stephenson	2230	1875	4-4-0T	M13	113	213	413	413	SAR 0413
Neilson	2553	1880	4-4-0TT	M40	140	240	440		Scrapped by 1904
Neilson	2554	1880	4-4-0TT	M41	141	241	441	441	SAR 0441
Neilson	2555	1880	4-4-0TT	M42	142	242	442		Scrapped by 1904
Neilson	2556	1880	4-4-0TT	M43	143	243	443	443	Scrapped by 1911
