= CGR 1st Class 2-6-0 1876 BP =

1876 design of South African steam locomotive

CGR 1st Class 2-6-0 1876 BP OVGS 2nd Class 2-6-0ST South African Class 01 2-6-0 1876
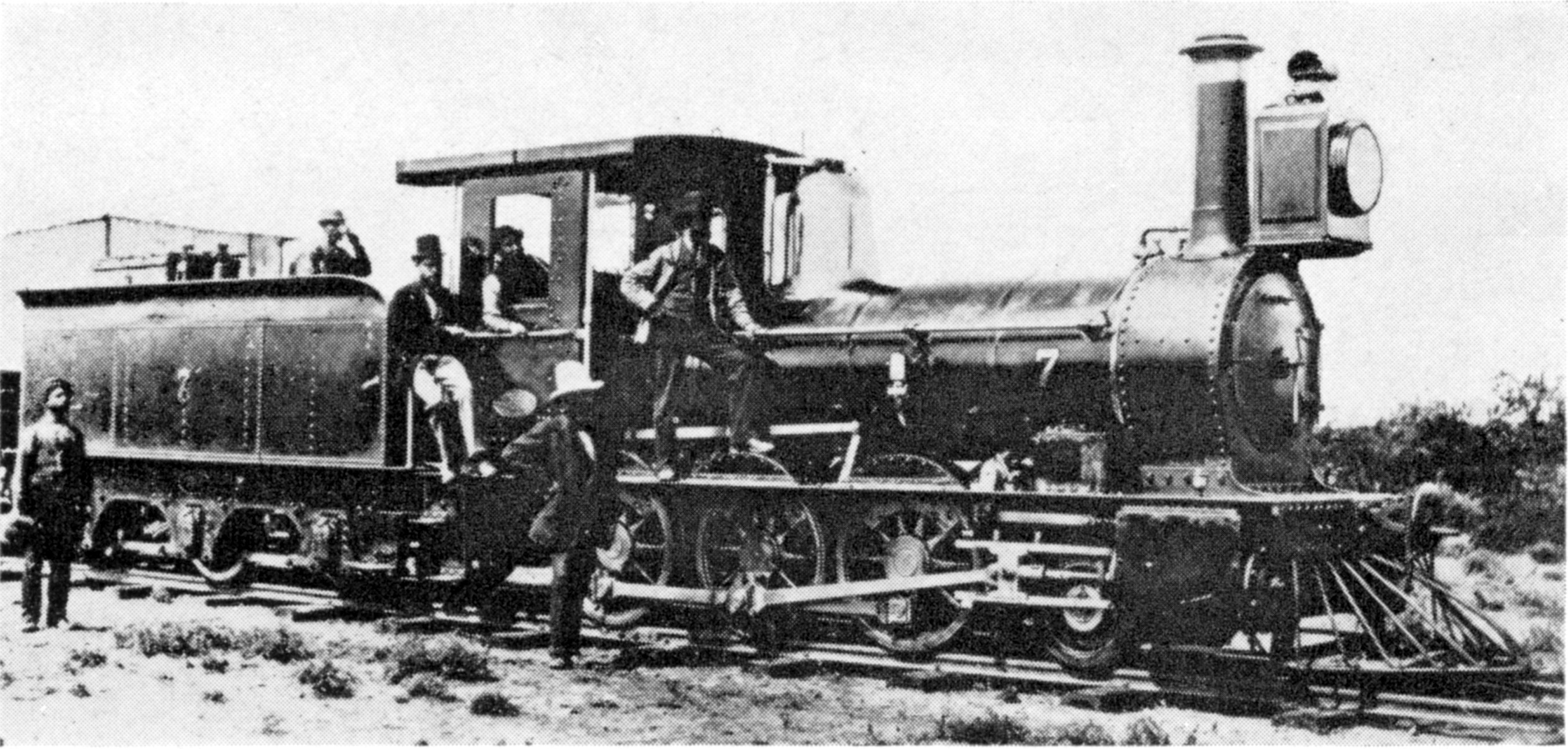
- 1st Class 2-6-0 at Bellville, numbered 7 aft of the smokebox
Type and origin
- Power type: Steam
- Designer: Beyer, Peacock & Company
- Builder: Beyer, Peacock & Company; Avonside Engine Company
- Serial number: BP 1571-1580; Avonside 1171-1178
- Build date: 1876-1877
- Total produced: 18
Specifications
- Configuration
  - Whyte: 2-6-0 (Mogul)
  - UIC: 1Cn2
- Driver: 2nd coupled axle
- Gauge: 3 ft 6 in (1,067 mm) Cape gauge
- Leading dia.: 24 in (610 mm)
- Coupled dia.: 39 in (991 mm)
- Tender wheels: 33 in (838 mm)
- Wheelbase: 27 ft 11 in (8,509 mm)
  - Axle spacing (Asymmetrical): 1-2: 3 ft 5 in (1,041 mm); 2-3: 3 ft 9 in (1,143 mm)
  - Engine: 10 ft 9 in (3,277 mm)
  - Coupled: 7 ft 2 in (2,184 mm)
  - Tender: 8 ft (2,438 mm)
- Length
  - Over couplers: 37 ft 8 in (11,481 mm)
- Height: 11 ft (3,353 mm)
- Frame type: Plate
- Axle load: 5 LT 12 cwt (5,690 kg)
  - Leading: 3 LT 15 cwt 1 qtr (3,823 kg)
  - 1st coupled: 5 LT 12 cwt (5,690 kg)
  - 2nd coupled: 5 LT 9 cwt 3 qtr (5,576 kg)
  - 3rd coupled: 5 LT 5 cwt 1 qtr (5,347 kg)
- Adhesive weight: 16 LT 7 cwt (16,610 kg)
- Loco weight: 20 LT 2 cwt 1 qtr (20,440 kg)
- Tender weight: 17 LT 17 cwt (18,140 kg)
- Total weight: 37 LT 19 cwt 1 qtr (38,570 kg)
- Tender type: 3-axle
- Fuel type: Coal
- Fuel capacity: 2 LT 10 cwt (2.5 t)
- Water cap.: 1,700 imp gal (7,730 L)
- Firebox
  - Type: Round-top
  - Grate area: 9 1/2 sq ft (0.88 m^{2})
- Boiler
  - Pitch: 5 ft 2 in (1,575 mm)
  - Tube plates: 9 ft 5 1/4 in (2,877 mm)
  - Small tubes: 116: 1 3/4 in (44 mm)
- Boiler pressure: 130 psi (896 kPa)
- Safety valve: Salter
- Heating surface
  - Firebox: 44 sq ft (4.1 m^{2})
  - Tubes: 492 sq ft (45.7 m^{2})
  - Total surface: 536 sq ft (49.8 m^{2})
- Cylinders: Two
- Cylinder size: 12 in (305 mm) bore 20 in (508 mm) stroke
- Valve gear: Stephenson
- Valve type: Slide
- Train brakes: Tender & guard's van
- Couplers: Johnston link-and-pin
Performance figures
- Tractive effort: 7,200 lbf (32 kN) @ 75%
Career
- Operators: Cape Government Railways; Sudan; OVGS; Transvaal collieries Imperial Military Railways; Central South African Railways; South African Railways
- Class: CGR 1st Class, SAR Class 01
- Number in class: 18
- Numbers: W7-W24
- Official name: Peacock (No. W7)
- Delivered: 1876-1877
- First run: 1876
- Withdrawn: 1916

The Cape Government Railways 1st Class 2-6-0 of 1876 by Beyer, Peacock & Company and Avonside Engine Company was a South African steam locomotive from the pre-Union era in the Cape of Good Hope.

In 1876 and 1877, the Cape Government Railways placed eighteen 2-6-0 Mogul type locomotives in freight service on the Cape Western system. They were designated 1st Class when a classification system was adopted.

== Manufacturers ==
Ten 2-6-0 tender goods locomotives were delivered to the Cape Government Railways (CGR) from Beyer, Peacock & Company in 1876, numbered in the range from W7 to W16 for the Western System. The first one, no. W7, was named Peacock. The following year, another eight were delivered from Avonside Engine Company, numbered in the range from W17 to W24. All of them were equipped with six-wheeled tenders.

While they were acquired as goods locomotives, they were used on all kinds of traffic, including shunting. These locomotives were later designated 1st Class when a locomotive classification system was introduced by the CGR.

== Characteristics ==
The cylinders were arranged horizontally and outside the engine frame. The slide valves, mounted above the cylinders, were actuated by Stephenson's Link motion. The engine's boiler barrel sections were not arranged telescopically, but were jointed end-to-end with butt straps.

Brakes

The six-wheeled tender was equipped with a hand brake and wooden brake blocks, but the engine's coupled wheels were not braked. Until c. 1876, it was universal practice with tender engines to not fit brakes on the coupled wheels. Train braking was therefore by means of the tender's hand brake and the brakes on the guard's van, or brake van, with reliance on the guard to apply or release the van's brakes upon whistle signals from the driver.

Feedwater

The feedwater pump was fitted to the front frame stretcher and was driven by an eccentric on the driver axle. The locomotive was also equipped with a small feedwater injector, invented by the French engineer Henri Giffard in 1852, for use in cases of emergency. The pump and the injector feed had separate clack boxes.

The axle-driven feedwater pump had two disadvantages, the hydraulic ram action of the pump when running at high speed which tended to cause burst pumps and pipe connections, and the inability to feed the boiler while the engine was stationary. It was abandoned by locomotive design engineers once the injector feed system had been proven successful.

== Service ==
=== Cape Government Railways ===
As a result of the distances involved on the new lines which were being built into the arid Karoo and the limited onboard coal and water capacities of tank engines, the CGR favoured tender locomotives over tank locomotives for mainline work from the outset. At the time these locomotives entered service in 1876, the Western System's line from Cape Town was completed to Worcester, having been officially opened on 16 June 1876.

The line from Worcester up the Hex River rail pass to Montagu Road, was completed in 1877. Passengers en route to Kimberley detrained at Montagu Road, where they usually spent the night in the local hotel before proceeding to Matjiesfontein by horse-drawn coach the following day.

Apart from some which were sold or disposed of between 1884 and 1896, all but one these locomotives remained on the Western System. Until c. 1882, they saw service on all parts of the system, working out of Cape Town deeper into the Karoo, as the line was being extended and opened to Beaufort West and beyond. By 1890 one of them, no. W17, was transferred to the Midland System, where it was renumbered 414.

=== Cape Central Railways ===
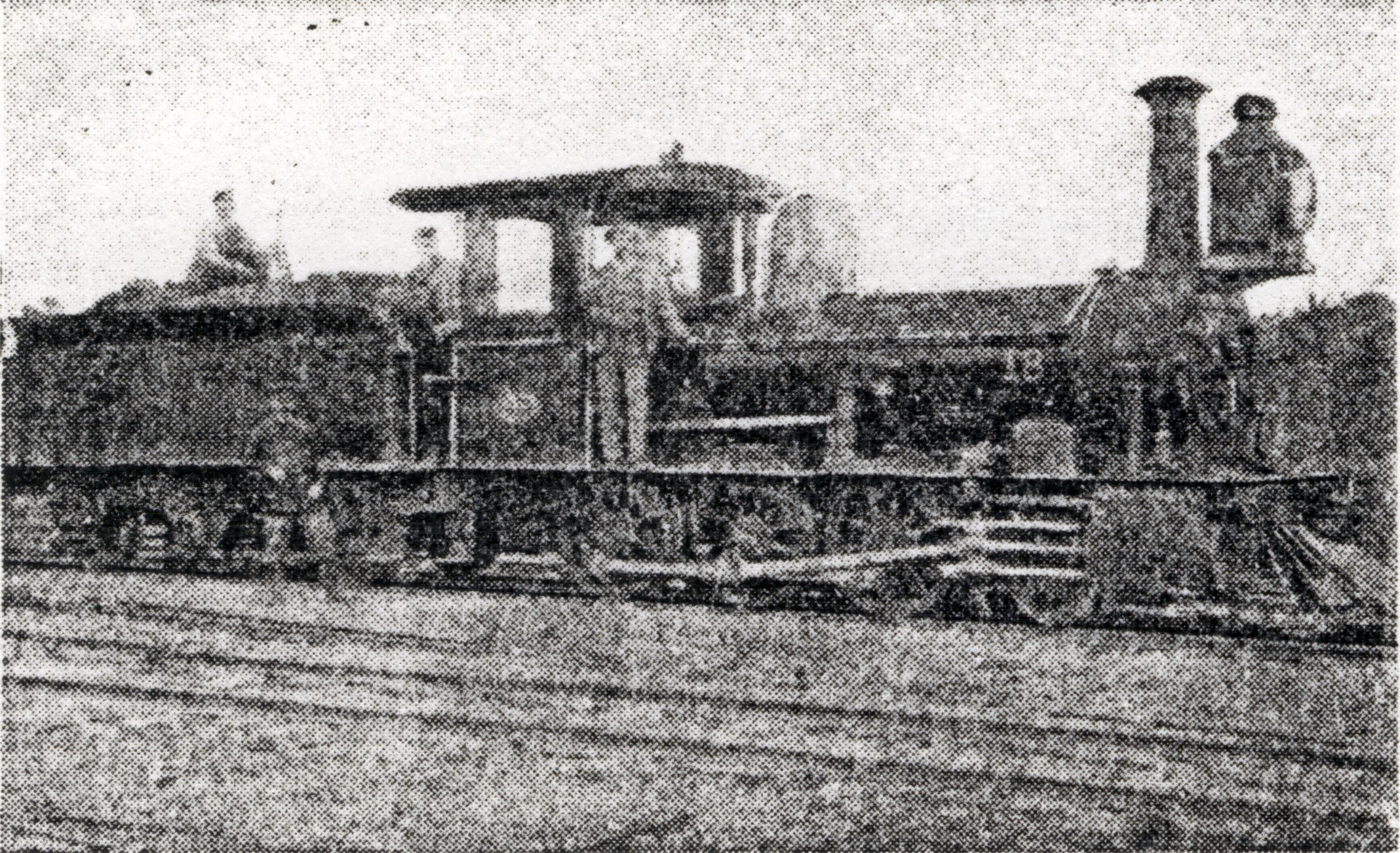
CCR 1st Class engine with no. 18 aft of the smokebx

Early in 1883, the Cape of Good Hope Government, by Act 16, authorised the Cape Central Railways (CCR) to construct a 42 miles (68 kilometres) long line from Worcester via Robertson to Roodewal. The amount of £100,000 was contributed to the cost of construction by Government, on condition that the line be made equal in all respects to the CGR lines.

The CCR's line was opened to traffic in 1887 and most of its rolling stock was purchased from the CGR. The first locomotives to serve on the CCR were some of these Beyer, Peacock engines, which were initially used as construction locomotives and later for shunting.

As a result of continued ox-wagon competition, the CCR went bankrupt in 1892. In January 1893, the whole of the assets of the CCR was purchased by a new company, the New Cape Central Railways (NCCR).

=== Sudan ===
Four of these locomotives, numbers W7, W9, W13 and W14, were sold to Sudan in October 1884. Since number gap-filling was at the order of the day on the CGR at the time, the locomotives in the number range from 21 to 24 were renumbered to 7, 9, 13 and 14 at some stage between 1886 and 1888.

=== Transvaal collieries ===
Two of these locomotives are known to have been sold to collieries in the Transvaal Republic at some stage between 1890 and 1895. By 1895, one was in service at Great Eastern Colliery and another at the Cassel Coal Company, both near Springs on the East Rand. Boiler records show them as 1877-built, which identifies them as from the Avonside batch of locomotives, and the most likely candidates are two of the three locomotives numbers 7, 9 and 14 (formerly numbers 21, 22 and 24), one of which possibly became no. 303 Bloemfontein.

=== Oranje-Vrijstaat Gouwerment-Spoorwegen ===
Photographic evidence shows that at least one of these locomotives was rebuilt to a saddle-tank engine. Towards the end of 1896, a saddle-tank locomotive was sold to the Oranje-Vrijstaat Gouwerment-Spoorwegen (OVGS), where it was classified as 2nd Class, allocated number 3 and named Bloemfontein. It was employed as shop locomotive at the Bloemfontein railway workshops.

During the Second Boer War, engine no. 3 Bloemfontein came onto the roster of the Imperial Military Railways (IMR) as no. 303 Bloemfontein. When the war ended, the IMR was transformed into the Central South African Railways (CSAR) and the locomotive retained the number 303.

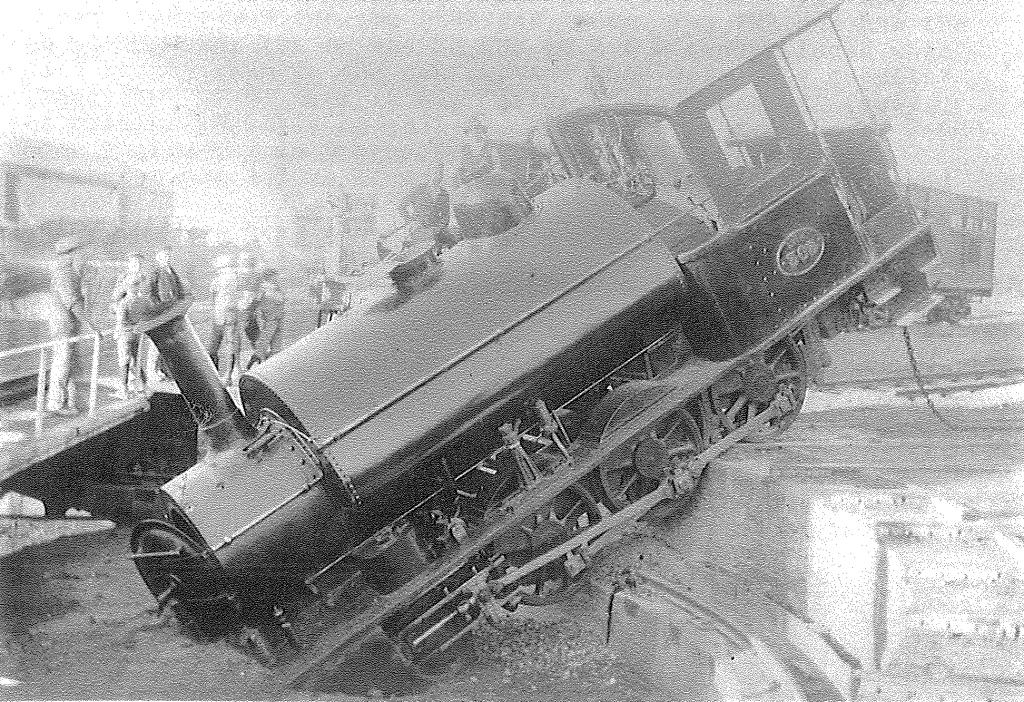
OVGS no. 3, CSAR no. 303 Bloemfontein, c. 1902

Until photographic evidence proved differently, it had been believed that this locomotive was rebuilt from the Midland System's 1st Class 2-6-0 engine no. M22, built by Kitson and Company in 1876. However, judging from the unique position of the steam dome on locomotive no. 303, depicted here after a turntable mishap, it was rebuilt from one of the locomotives built by Beyer, Peacock and Avonside, on which the steam dome was located further back, closer to the cab than usual.

The locomotive identification error may have had its origin on the original engine power chart of the OVGS, on which the caption described the engine as "Second Class Kitson" even though the accompanying locomotive diagram was that of a Beyer, Peacock- or Avonside-built engine with its rearward-located steam dome.

The original CGR number of the locomotive is not known with certainty. Three locomotives which still appeared on the CGR roster in 1890, numbers 7, 9 and 14 as mentioned earlier (formerly numbers 21, 22 and 24), were no longer listed by year-end in 1896 and are the most likely candidates. It was possibly the Western System's no. 9 (ex no. W22), built by Avonside, since it is possible that a transcription error may have led to the number W22 being recorded as number M22.

=== South African Railways ===
When the Union of South Africa was established on 31 May 1910, the three Colonial government railways (CGR, Natal Government Railways and Central South African Railways) were united under a single administration to control and administer the railways, ports and harbours of the Union. Even though the South African Railways and Harbours came into existence in 1910, the actual classification and renumbering of all the rolling stock of the three constituent railways was only implemented with effect from 1 January 1912.

By 1912, three of these locomotives survived on the CGR to be taken onto the SAR roster. They were considered obsolete by the SAR, designated Class 01 and renumbered by having the numeral 0 prefixed to their existing numbers. All of them were withdrawn from service by 1916.

The engine no. 303 Bloemfontein of the CSAR was treated differently and was listed as excluded from the renumbering schedules. It was scrapped by the SAR in 1912.

== Works numbers and renumbering ==
Apart from the four which were sold to Sudan, all these locomotives were renumbered at times during the CGR era. By 1886, the system prefixes were dropped. By 1888, some official decided to start practicing gap-filling by renumbering numbers 21 to 24. Further renumbering, for reasons unknown, occurred by 1896 and 1904.

The builders, works numbers, years in service, original numbers and known renumbering of these Cape 1st Class Moguls of 1876 are listed in the table.

CGR 1st Class 2-6-0 of 1876 – Beyer, Peacock and Avonside
Builder	Works no.	Year	Orig. no.	1886 no.	1888 no.	1890 no.	1896 no.	1904 no.	SAR no.	Notes
Beyer, Peacock	1571	1876	W7							Sudan 1884
Beyer, Peacock	1572	1876	W8	8	8	8	5	5	05	
Beyer, Peacock	1573	1876	W9							Sudan 1884
Beyer, Peacock	1574	1876	W10	10	10					
Beyer, Peacock	1575	1876	W11	11	11	11	3	3		
Beyer, Peacock	1576	1876	W12	12	12	12	12	39		
Beyer, Peacock	1577	1876	W13							Sudan 1884
Beyer, Peacock	1578	1876	W14							Sudan 1884
Beyer, Peacock	1579	1876	W15	15	15	15	15	40		
Beyer, Peacock	1580	1876	W16	16	16	16	16	41		
Avonside	1171	1877	W17	17	17	414	414	414	0414	to Midland
Avonside	1172	1877	W18	18	18					
Avonside	1173	1877	W19	19	19					
Avonside	1174	1877	W20	20	20					
Avonside	1175	1877	W21	21	7	7				OVGS/Springs?
Avonside	1176	1877	W22	22	9	9				OVGS/Springs?
Avonside	1177	1877	W23	23	13	13	4	4	04	
Avonside	1178	1877	W24	24	14	14				OVGS/Springs?

== Nyasaland Railways myth ==
In his book Steam Locomotives of the South African Railways, Volume 1: 1859-1910, D.F. Holland states that two of these locomotives, numbers W12 and W16, by that time renumbered to 39 and 41 respectively, were sold to the Nyasaland Railways at some stage between 1904 and 1912.

As with engines from some other early CGR locomotive classes which were supposedly sold to Nyasaland, this sale may be discounted as a myth which possibly began as a result of misinterpretation of entries in old and scant CGR records. The early locomotives in Nyasaland are well documented and no reference exists to locomotives which were obtained from the CGR. The first railway in Nyasaland was the Shire Highlands Railway (SHR), on which construction began in 1904 and which was opened in 1908. The second railway was the Central African Railway (CAR), on which Pauling & Co. began construction in 1913. Nyasaland Railways was only formed in 1930 to amalgamate the SHR and CAR.

== Illustration ==
In addition to the known numbering and renumbering, there appears to have been another CGR numbering system. Apart from photographic evidence, no information about this numbering system has been found as yet. In one of the examples depicted here, Beyer, Peacock-built no. 39, originally no. W12, bears the number 27 on the boiler just to the rear of the smokebox, which does not fit in with any of the known numbers of these locomotives. In the other, the same locomotive bears the number 15 in the same position aft of the smokebox. These numbers are therefore probably not the official engine numbers and may possibly even be boiler numbers, since a boiler number would migrate with a boiler during a boiler change. The same would probably be true about the numbers 7 and 18 aft of the smokebox on the other locomotives depicted.

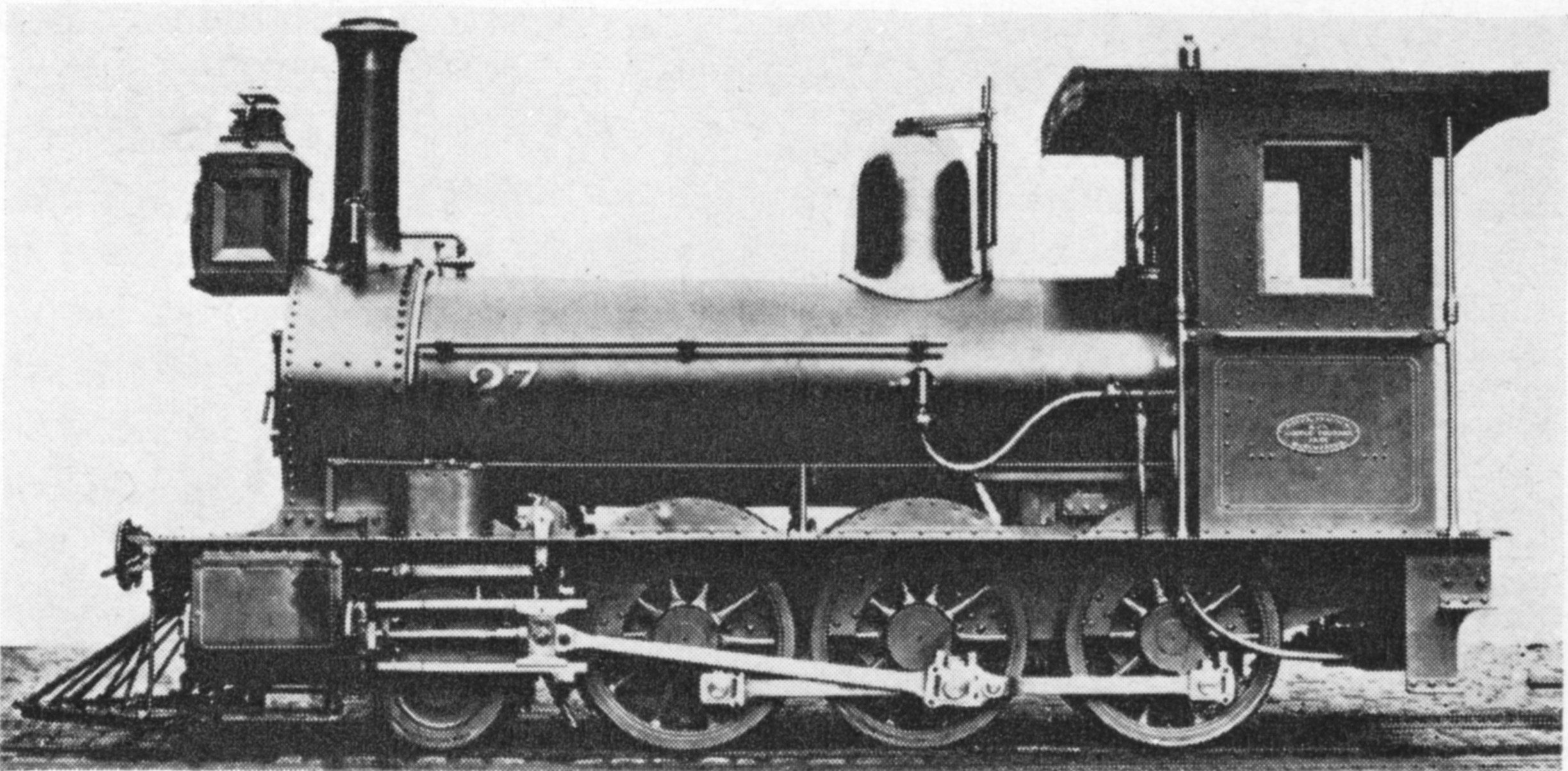
Ex no. W12, then no. 12, then no. 39, without tender, numbered 27 aft of the smokebox

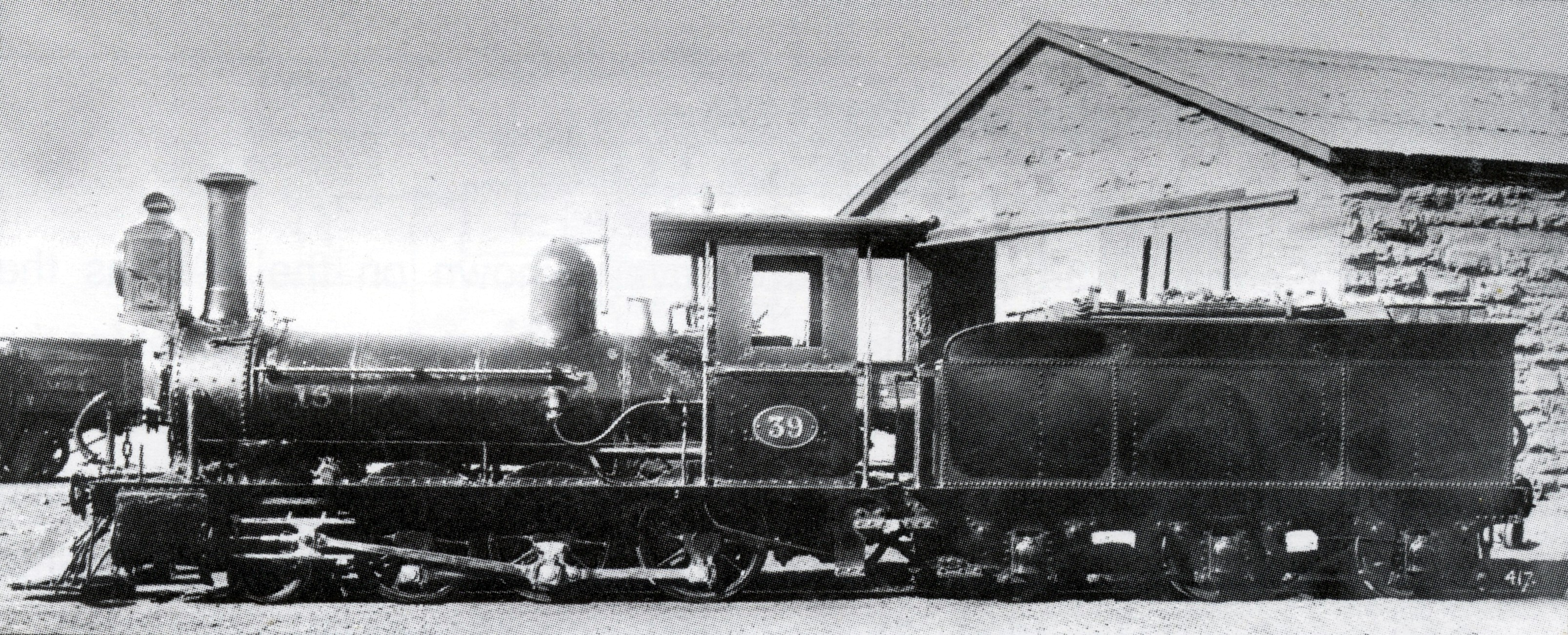
Ex no. W12, then no. 12, then no. 39, with tender, numbered 15 aft of the smokebox
