= CGR 1st Class 2-6-0 1876 Kitson =

Type of steam locomotive

CGR 1st Class 2-6-0 1876 Kitson South African Class 01 2-6-0ST
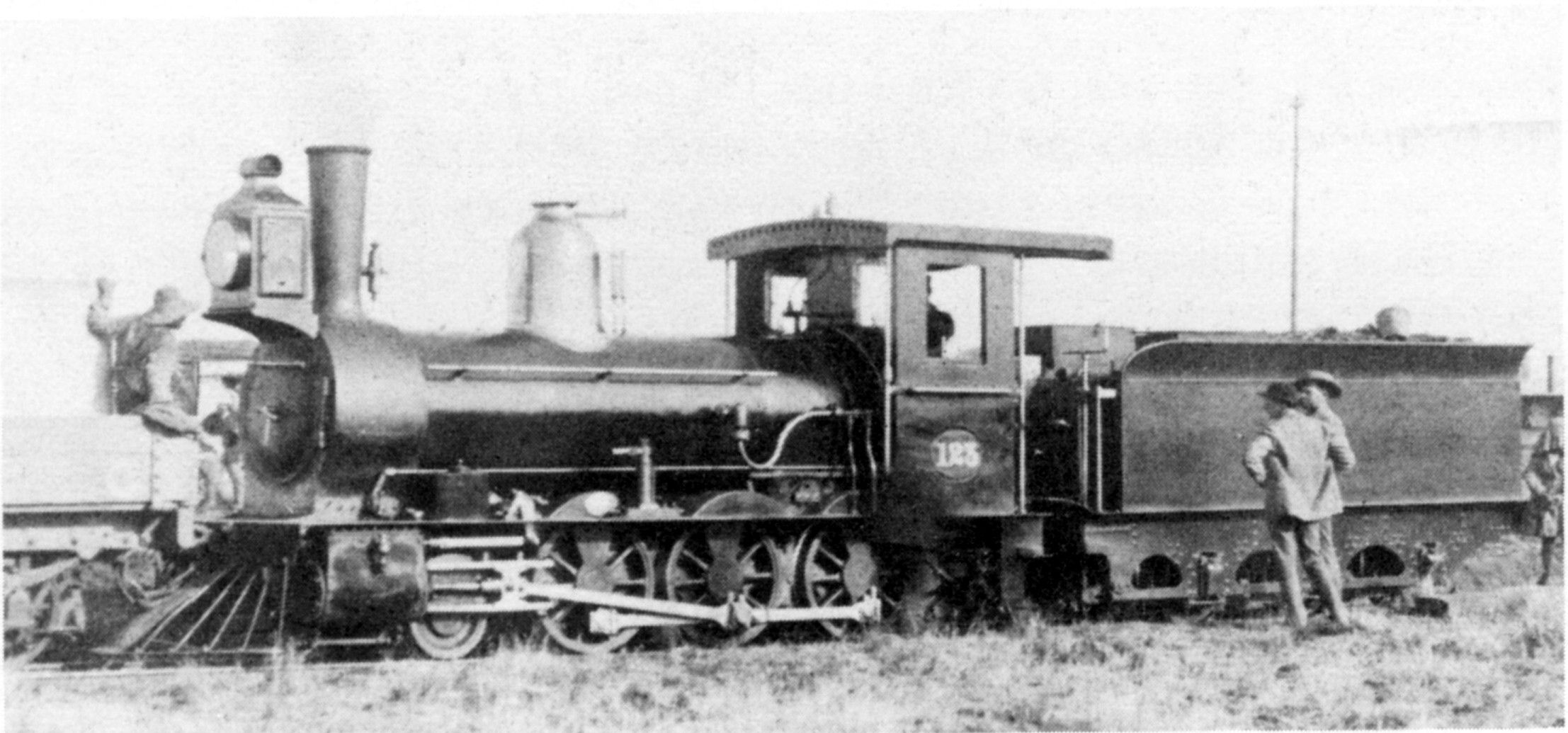
- No. 123 (ex no. M23), still as a tender locomotive
Type and origin
- ♠ 2-6-0 tender locomotive ♥ 2-6-0ST saddle-tank locomotive
- Power type: Steam
- Designer: Kitson and Company
- Builder: Kitson and Company
- Serial number: 2079–2086
- Build date: 1876–1877
- Total produced: 8
- Rebuilder: Cape Government Railways
- Number rebuilt: 8 rebuilt to saddle tank
Specifications
- Configuration
  - Whyte: 2-6-0 (Mogul)
  - UIC: 1Cn2
- Driver: 2nd coupled axle
- Gauge: 3 ft 6 in (1,067 mm) Cape gauge
- Leading dia.: 24 in (610 mm)
- Coupled dia.: 39 in (991 mm)
- Tender wheels: 33 in (838 mm)
- Wheelbase
  - Axle spacing (Asymmetrical): 1-2: 3 ft 5 in (1,041 mm); 2-3: 4 ft 1 in (1,245 mm)
  - Engine: 11 ft 3 1/2 in (3,442 mm)
  - Coupled: 7 ft 6 in (2,286 mm)
  - Tender: 8 ft (2,438 mm)
- Length
  - Over couplers: ♥ 22 ft 9 1/2 in (6,947 mm)
- Height: 11 ft 4 1/2 in (3,467 mm)
- Axle load: ♥ 7 LT 8 cwt (7,519 kg)
  - Leading: ♥ 5 LT 6 cwt (5,385 kg)
  - 1st coupled: ♥ 6 LT 16 cwt (6,909 kg)
  - 2nd coupled: ♥ 7 LT 8 cwt (7,519 kg)
  - 3rd coupled: ♥ 6 LT 3 cwt (6,249 kg)
- Adhesive weight: ♥ 20 LT 7 cwt (20,680 kg)
- Loco weight: ♥ 25 LT 13 cwt (26,060 kg)
- Tender weight: ♠ 17 LT 17 cwt (18,140 kg)
- Tender type: 3-axle
- Fuel type: Coal
- Fuel capacity: ♠ 2 LT 10 cwt (2.5 t) ♥ 10 long hundredweight (0.5 t)
- Water cap.: ♥ 520 imp gal (2,360 L)
- Tender cap.: ♠ 1,700 imp gal (7,730 L)
- Firebox
  - Type: Round-top
  - Grate area: 10 sq ft (0.93 m^{2})
- Boiler
  - Pitch: 5 ft 8 in (1,727 mm)
- Boiler pressure: 140 psi (965 kPa)
- Safety valve: Salter
- Heating surface
  - Firebox: 49 sq ft (4.6 m^{2})
  - Tubes: 483 sq ft (44.9 m^{2})
  - Total surface: 532 sq ft (49.4 m^{2})
- Cylinders: Two
- Cylinder size: 12 in (305 mm) bore 20 in (508 mm) stroke
- Valve gear: Stephenson
- Couplers: Johnston link-and-pin
Performance figures
- Tractive effort: 7,754 lbf (34.49 kN) @ 75%
Career
- Operators: Cape Government Railways; South African Railways
- Class: CGR 1st Class, SAR Class 01
- Number in class: 8
- Numbers: M17-M24
- Delivered: 1876–1877
- First run: 1876

The Cape Government Railways 1st Class 2-6-0 of 1876 by Kitson was a South African steam locomotive from the pre-Union era in the Cape of Good Hope.

In 1876 and 1877, the Cape Government Railways placed eight 2-6-0 Mogul type tender locomotives, built by Kitson, in service on the Cape Midland system. They were all eventually rebuilt to saddle-tank locomotives for use as shunting engines. Later, when a classification system was introduced by the Railways, they were designated 1st Class.

== Manufacturer ==
Eight 2-6-0 Mogul type tender locomotives were delivered to the Cape Government Railways (CGR) from Kitson and Company in 1876 and 1877, numbered in the range from M17 to M24.

The locomotives were equipped with six-wheeled tenders. The engines were very similar to a pair of 2-6-0T Stephenson's Patent back-to-back locomotives which had been delivered to the Midland System from the same manufacturer earlier in 1876. The two types differed in respect of their boiler pitch, which was 5 inches (127 millimetres) higher on the tender locomotives, and their wheelbase and coupled wheel spacing, with the second and third coupled wheels 3 inches (76 millimetres) further apart on the back-to-back tank locomotives.

== Characteristics ==
The locomotives were very similar in appearance to the Beyer, Peacock-built 2-6-0 locomotives which were delivered to the Western System in that same year. The most obvious difference was the steam dome which was located further forward on the boiler on the Kitson engines, about midway between cab and chimney.

The feedwater pump, attached to the right hand side of the spectacle plate, was actuated from the piston crosshead. The locomotive was, in addition, equipped with a small feedwater injector feed attached to the left side of the smokebox, for use in cases of emergency or while the locomotive was stationary. The injector had been invented by the French engineer Henri Giffard in 1852.

Tyre wear was reduced by supplying jets of water, fed from 1/2 inch (13 millimetres) diameter pipes, to the leading wheels while rounding curves. This was found to diminish friction significantly.

The cylinders and slide valve faces were lubricated by tallow cups, attached to the sides of the cylinder assembly. When melted tallow was later found to be unsatisfactory, it was replaced by vegetable oils.

== Rebuilding ==
The eight locomotives were eventually all rebuilt for use in shunting service by relieving them of their tenders and equipping them with saddle-tanks. This was probably done while they were gradually getting withdrawn from mainline work. The main picture shows no. 123 still as a tender locomotive and can be dated to somewhere between c. 1886, when it was renumbered from M23 to 123, and c. 1890, when it was renumbered to 223.

== Service ==
=== Cape Government Railways ===
By year-end 1896, five of the locomotives were no longer reflected in the CGR registers. The remaining three all ended up being employed as shunting engines in Port Elizabeth, where they spent the rest of their service lives. When a classification system was introduced on the CGR, they were designated 1st Class.

=== South African Railways ===
When the Union of South Africa was established on 31 May 1910, the three Colonial government railways (CGR, Natal Government Railways and Central South African Railways) were united under a single administration to control and administer the railways, ports and harbours of the Union. Even though the South African Railways and Harbours came into existence in 1910, the actual classification and renumbering of all the rolling stock of the three constituent railways was only implemented with effect from 1 January 1912.

By 1912, the three remaining shunting engines in Port Elizabeth still survived to be taken onto the SAR roster. Since they were considered obsolete by the SAR, they were designated Class 01 and renumbered by having the numeral 0 prefixed to their existing numbers. Even though they were considered obsolete, two of them were only scrapped in the 1930s.

== Renumbering ==
During the CGR era, all these locomotives were renumbered more than once. By 1886, the Midland System's "M" prefix was replaced by the numeral 1. They were renumbered at least twice more, by 1890 and by 1896. The works numbers, years in service, original numbers and known renumbering of the Cape 1st Class Kitson-built Moguls of 1876 are listed in the table.

CGR 1st Class 2-6-0 Kitson of 1876
Works no.	Year	Orig. no.	1886 no.	1890 no.	1896 no.	1899 no.	1904 no.	SAR no.	Scrapped
2079	1876	M17	117	217					
2080	1876	M18	118	218					
2081	1876	M19	119	219					
2082	1876	M20	120	220	420	420	420	0420	1914-09
2083	1876	M21	121	221	421	421	421	0421	1935-10
2084	1877	M22	122	222					
2085	1877	M23	123	223	423	423	423	0423	1933-02
2086	1877	M24	124	224					

== Oranje-Vrijstaat Gouwerment-Spoorwegen ==
Towards the end of 1896, a CGR 2-6-0 saddle-tank locomotive was sold to the Oranje-Vrijstaat Gouwerment-Spoorwegen (OVGS), where it was classified as 2nd Class, allocated number 3 and named Bloemfontein. It was employed as shop locomotive at the Bloemfontein railway workshops.

During the Second Boer War, engine no. 3 came onto the roster of the Imperial Military Railways (IMR) as no. 303. The IMR was transformed into the Central South African Railways (CSAR) when the war ended, and the locomotive retained the number 303.

Until photographic evidence came to light which proved differently, it had been believed that this locomotive was the Midland System's Kitson-built no. M22. However, judging from the position of the steam dome on engine no. 303, depicted after a turntable mishap, it was rebuilt from one of the Beyer, Peacock 1st Class 2-6-0 tender locomotives which had been built by Avonside Engine Company in 1877, on which the steam dome was located further back, closer to the cab.

The original locomotive was, most likely, the Western System's no. W22 which was also no longer reflected in the CGR registers by year-end in 1896. It is possible that a transcription error during research may have led to the number W22 being recorded as number M22.
