= 0-4-0 =

Locomotive wheel arrangement

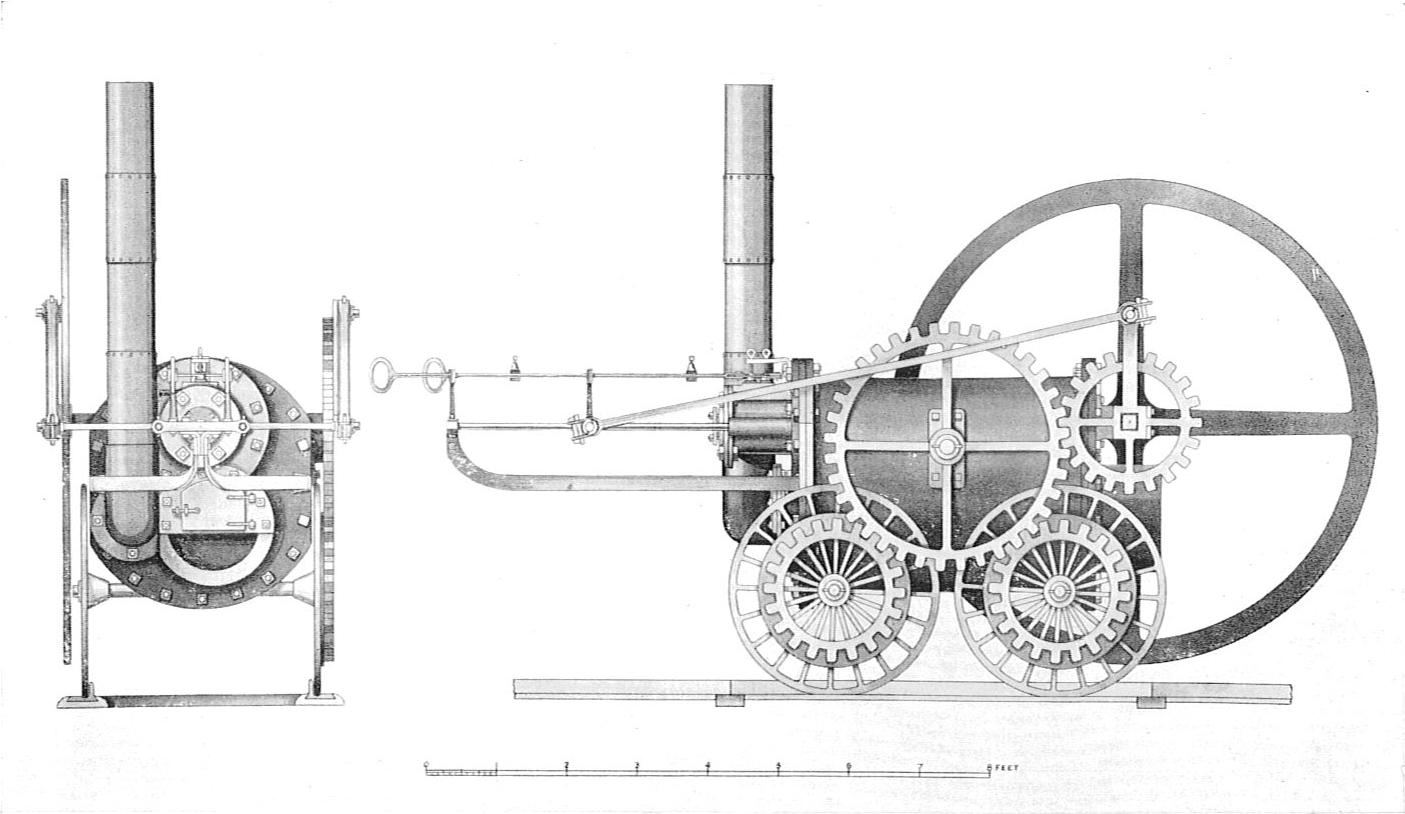
- Richard Trevithick's Coalbrookedale
Equivalent classifications
- UIC class: B
- French class: 020
- Turkish class: 22
- Swiss class: 2/2
- Russian class: 0-2-0
First known tank engine version
- First use: c. 1850
- Country: United Kingdom
- Railway: Caledonian Railway
- Designer: Robert Sinclair
- Benefits: Total engine mass as adhesive weight
- Drawbacks: Instability at speed
First known tender engine version
- First use: c. 1802
- Country: United Kingdom
- Locomotive: Coalbrookedale
- Designer: Richard Trevithick
- Builder: Richard Trevithick

Under the Whyte notation for the classification of steam locomotives, 0-4-0 represents one of the simplest possible types, that with two axles and four coupled wheels, all of which are driven. The wheels on the earliest four-coupled locomotives were connected by a single gear wheel, but from 1825 the wheels were usually connected with coupling rods to form a single driven set.

The notation 0-4-0T indicates a tank locomotive of this wheel arrangement on which its water and fuel is carried on board the engine itself, rather than in an attached tender.

In Britain, the Whyte notation of wheel arrangement was also often used for the classification of electric and diesel-electric locomotives with side-rod-coupled driving wheels.

Under the UIC classification used in Europe and, in more recent years, in simplified form in the United States, a 0-4-0 is classified as B (German and Italian) if the axles are connected by side rods or gearing and 020 (French), independent of axle motoring. The UIC's Bo classification for electric and diesel-electric locomotives indicates that the axles are independently motored, which would be 0-2-2-0 under the Whyte notation.

== Overview ==
0-4-0 locomotives were built as tank locomotives as well as tender locomotives. The former were more common in Europe and the latter in the United States, except in the tightest of situations such as that of a shop switcher locomotive, where overall length was a concern. The earliest 0-4-0 locomotives were tender engines and appeared as early as c. 1802. The 0-4-0 tank engines were introduced in the early 1850s. The type was found to be so useful in many locations that they continued to be built for more than a century and existed until the end of the steam era.

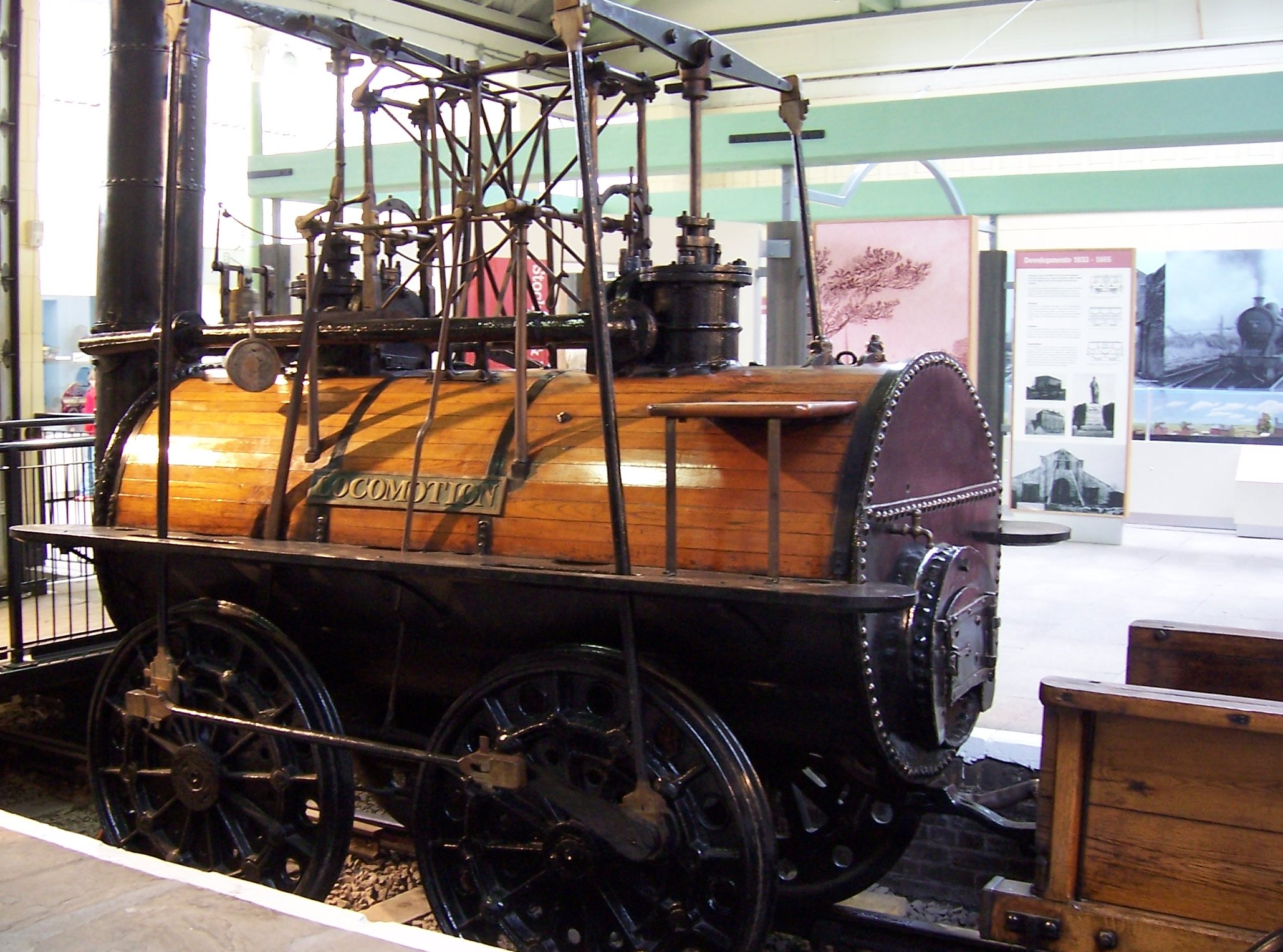
Locomotion No. 1

Richard Trevithick's Coalbrookedale (1802), Pen-y-Darren (1804) and Newcastle (1805) locomotives were of the 0-4-0 type, although in their cases the wheels were connected by a single gear wheel. The first 0-4-0 to use coupling rods was Locomotion No. 1, built by Robert Stephenson and Company for the Stockton and Darlington Railway in 1825. Stephenson also built the Lancashire Witch in 1828, and Timothy Hackworth built Sans Pareil which ran at the Rainhill Trials in 1829. The latter two locomotives later worked on the Bolton and Leigh Railway.

A four-wheeled configuration, where all the wheels are driving wheels, uses all the locomotive's mass for traction but is inherently unstable at speed. The type was therefore mainly used for switcher locomotives (also known as shunter locomotives in the United Kingdom). Because of the lack of stability, tender engines of this type were only built for a few decades in the United Kingdom. They were built for a longer period in the United States.

The possible tractive effort of an 0-4-0 within normal axle load limits was not enough to move large loads. By 1900, they had therefore largely been superseded for most purposes by locomotives with more complex wheel arrangements. They nevertheless continued to be used in situations where tighter radius curves existed or the shorter length was an advantage. Thus, they were commonly employed in dockyard work, industrial tramways, or as shop switchers.

The wheel arrangement was also used on specialised types such as fireless locomotives, crane tank locomotives, tram engines and geared steam locomotives. It was also widely used on narrow gauge railways.

== Usage ==
=== Australia ===
In New South Wales, Dorrigo Steam Railway and Museum has preserved twelve 0-4-0 steam locomotives and eight 0-4-0 diesel locomotives, a total of twenty examples, all on the one site.

=== Austria ===
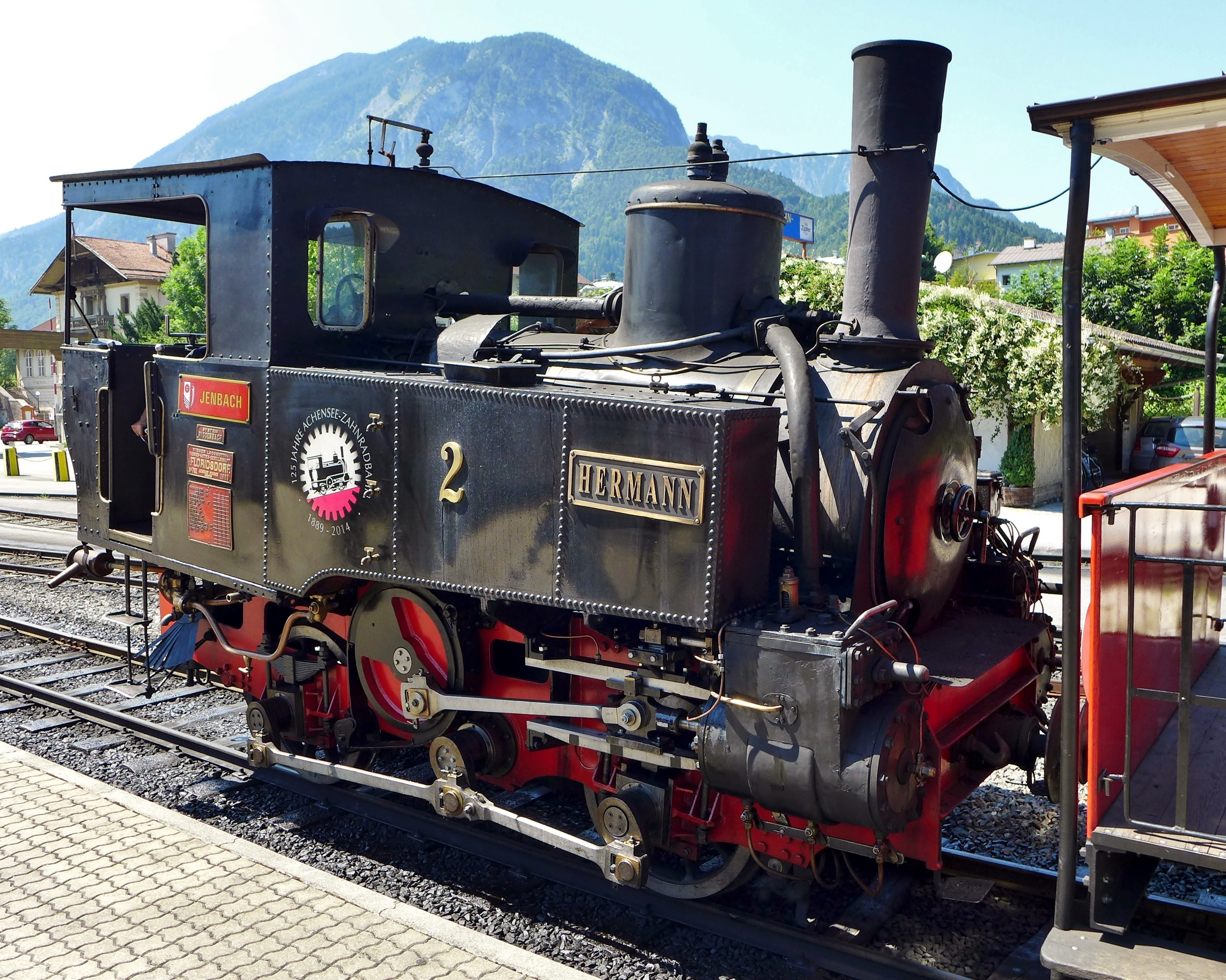
Achenseebahn 2

In Tyrol, Achensee Railway operates three 0-4-0 geared steam cog locomotives on their 1-meter narrow gauge tourist railway and has one on display. The locomotives were originally built by Wiener Lokomotivfabrik, but one has been rebuilt from scavenged parts.

=== Angola ===
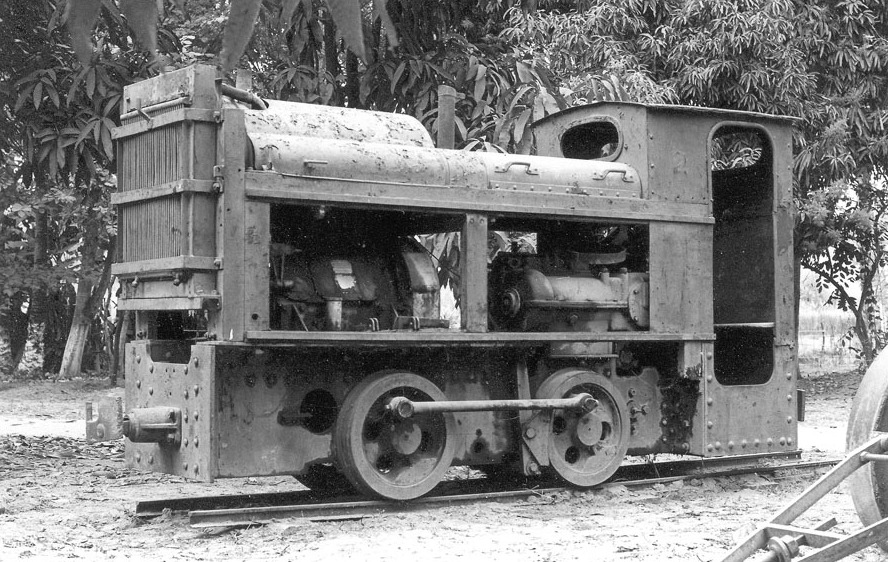
Catumbela Sugar's diesel shunter No. 963, Angola

The Catumbela Sugar Estate in Angola operated a narrow gauge line on the estate. One of their 0-4-0 locomotives, Rührthaler Maschinen-Fabrik 963 of 1929, was later rebuilt with a diesel engine.

=== Finland ===
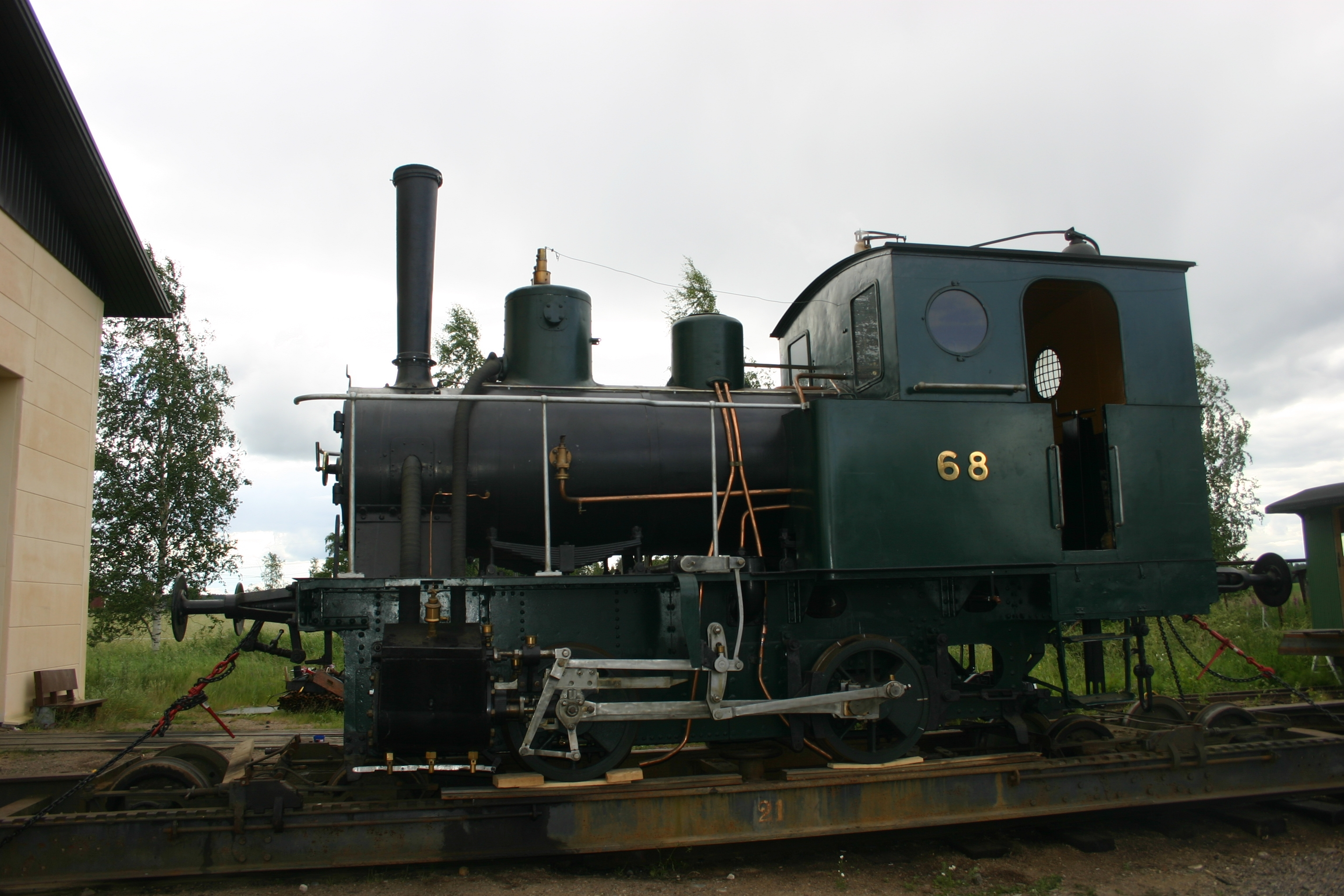
Finnish Class Vk4 locomotive No. 68

Finland had the E1 and Vk4 classes with an 0-4-0 wheel arrangement.

The E1 was a class of only two locomotives, numbered 76 and 77.

The Vk4 was also a class of only two locomotives, built by Borsig Lokomotiv Werke (AEG) of Germany in 1910. The Vk4s were used at a fortress, and were eventually also used in dismantling the fortress, after which one locomotive went into industrial use and was scrapped in 1951. The other was sold to the Finnish Railways and nicknamed Leena. It became No. 68 and is now the oldest working broad gauge locomotive in Finland, being preserved at the Finnish Railway Museum.

=== Indonesia ===
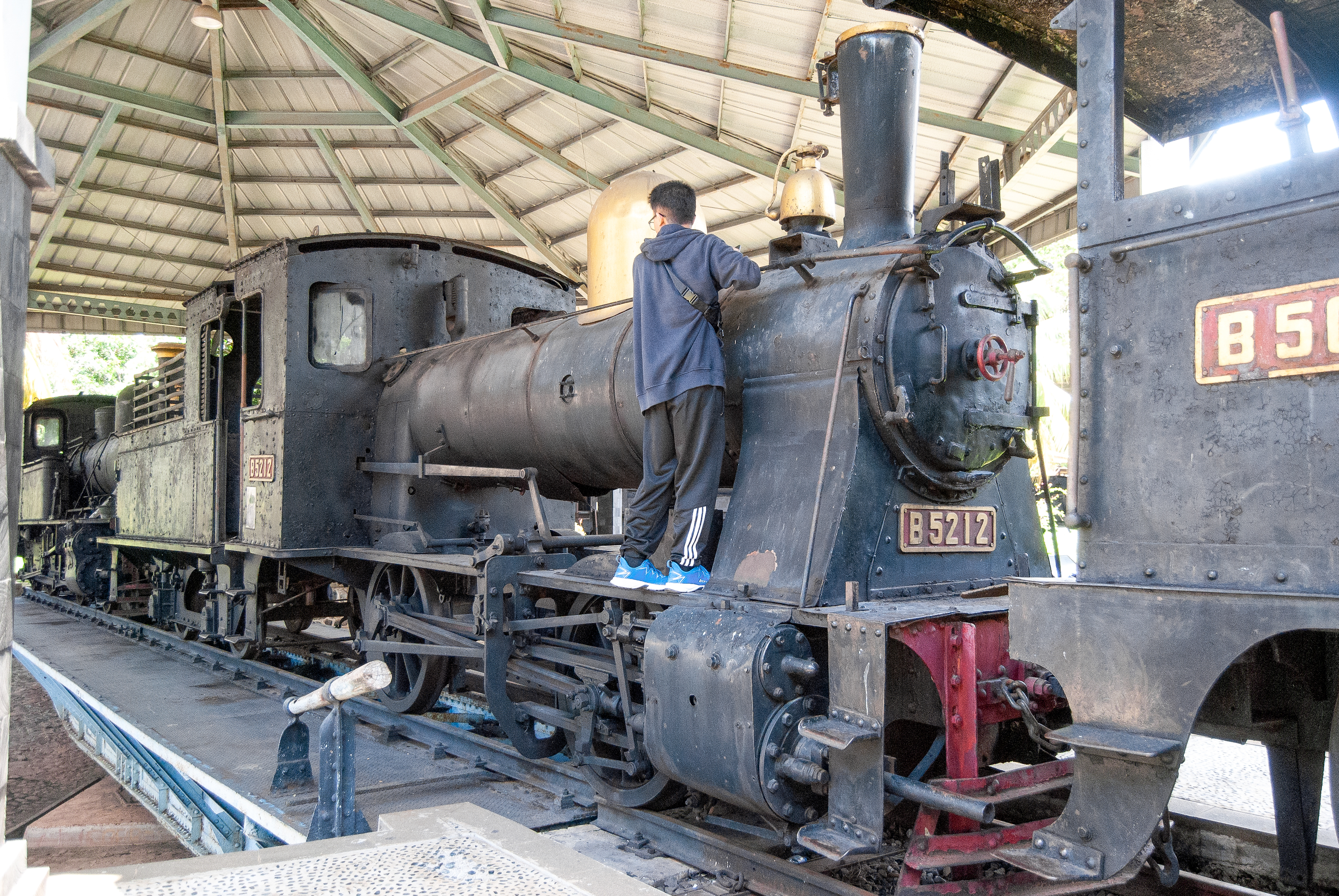
B5212 at the Transportation Museum of Taman Mini Indonesia Indah

The Samarang-Cheribon Stoomtram Maatschappij or SCS imported 27 cape gauge 0-4-0T SCS Class 100 locomotives between 1908 and 1911, originally to operate services from Kalibrodi-Samarang to Tanggung and Yogyakarta. They were built by Sächsische Maschinenfabrik in Chemnitz, Germany. They were a modern locomotive design for the time, equipped with a superheater.

The largest allocation of SCS 100s were in Tegal, Central Java for services to Purwokerto. Some were later converted to tram engines and worked in Tegal and Purwokerto.

After Japanese occupation and Indonesian Independence, these locomotives were renumbered to B52 class. All 27 locomotives were in existence at the end of 1960, but by 1970 only 15 units remained. Two locomotives have been preserved, B5212 at the Transportation Museum of Taman Mini Indonesia Indah and B5210 at the Ambarawa Railway Museum.

=== New Zealand ===
The NZR A class of 1873 consisted of three engine types of similar specification but differing detail. They were British and New Zealand-built and several were preserved.

=== Philippines ===
The only examples of this type in the Philippines were the five Manila class light-duty tank locomotives built by Hunslet Engine Company for the Manila Railway. They were ordered in 1885 for the Tranvía system until they were used on the Ferrocarril de Manila a Dagupan in the 1890s. After being retired from the Manila Railroad in 1927, Manila was sold to the newly-formed Central Azucarrera de Tarlac, where it was made into a tank-tender locomotive until the 1980s. The locomotive was scrapped by c. 1991.

=== South Africa ===
==== Brunel gauge ====
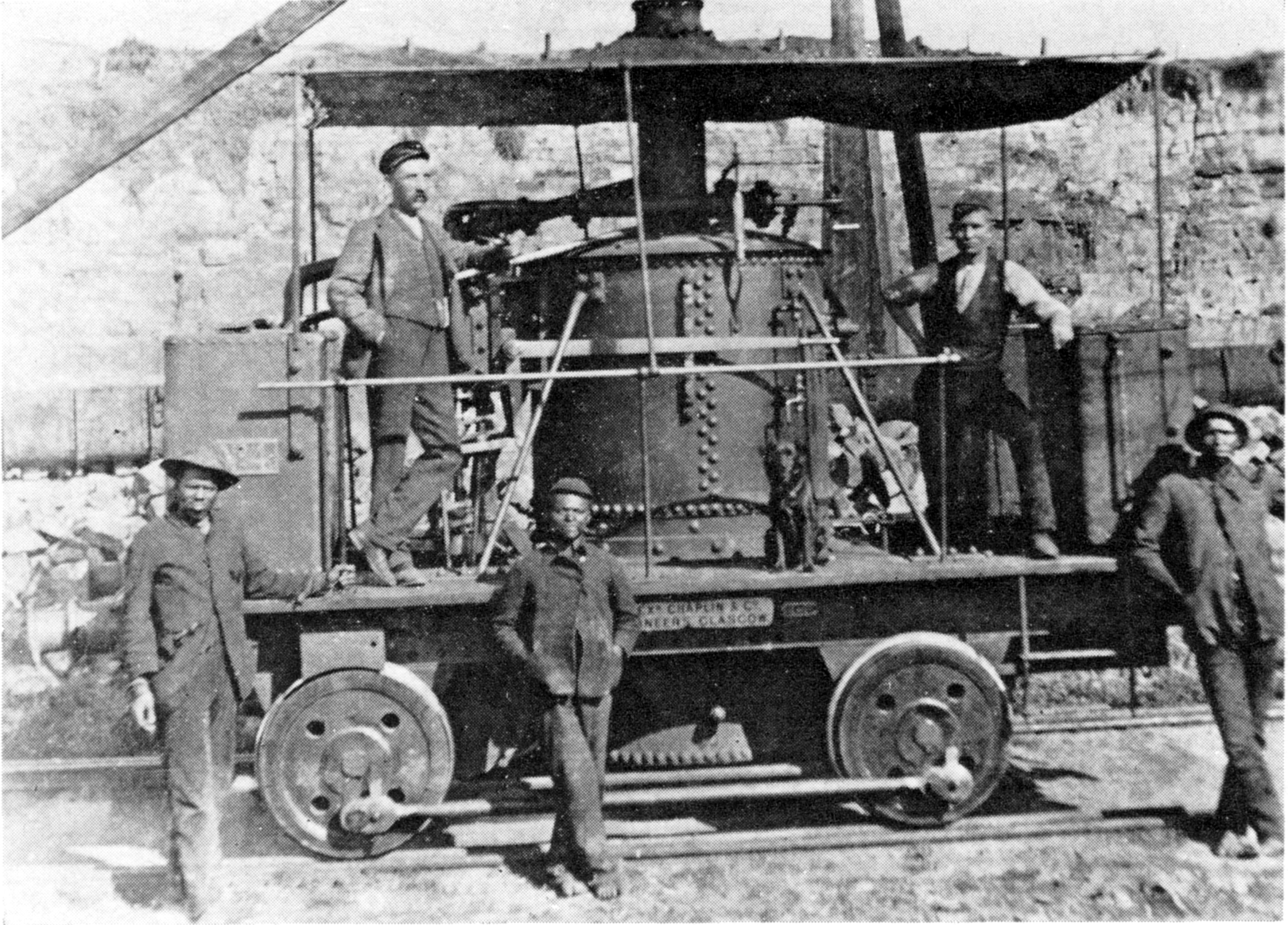
East London Harbour's 0-4-0VB construction locomotive

In 1847, the government of the Cape Colony established harbour boards at its three major ports, Table Bay, Port Elizabeth and East London. While railway lines were laid at all these harbours, trains were for the most part initially hauled by oxen or mules. The first steam locomotives to see service at these harbours were 7 ft 1/4 in (2,140 mm) Brunel gauge engines which were placed in service on breakwater construction at Table Bay Harbour in 1862 and East London Harbour in 1874.

- At Table Bay Harbour a third Brunel gauge 0-4-0T locomotive was acquired from Fletcher, Jennings & Co. in 1874 to haul tip-wagons from the Victoria Basin excavation site to the breakwater which was being constructed simultaneously.
- The East London Harbour's construction locomotives were 0-4-0 vertical boiler engines, similar in appearance to the American Grasshopper type. Four of them were acquired from Alexander Chaplin & Co. between 1873 and 1880, although the first one was only placed in service in 1874.
- A fourth locomotive was added at Table Bay Harbour in 1879, a 0-4-0 well-tank engine, also built by Fletcher, Jennings.
- Three 0-4-0 saddle-tank locomotives entered breakwater construction service in Table Bay Harbour, two in 1881 and one more in 1893, built by Black, Hawthorn & Co.

==== Standard gauge ====
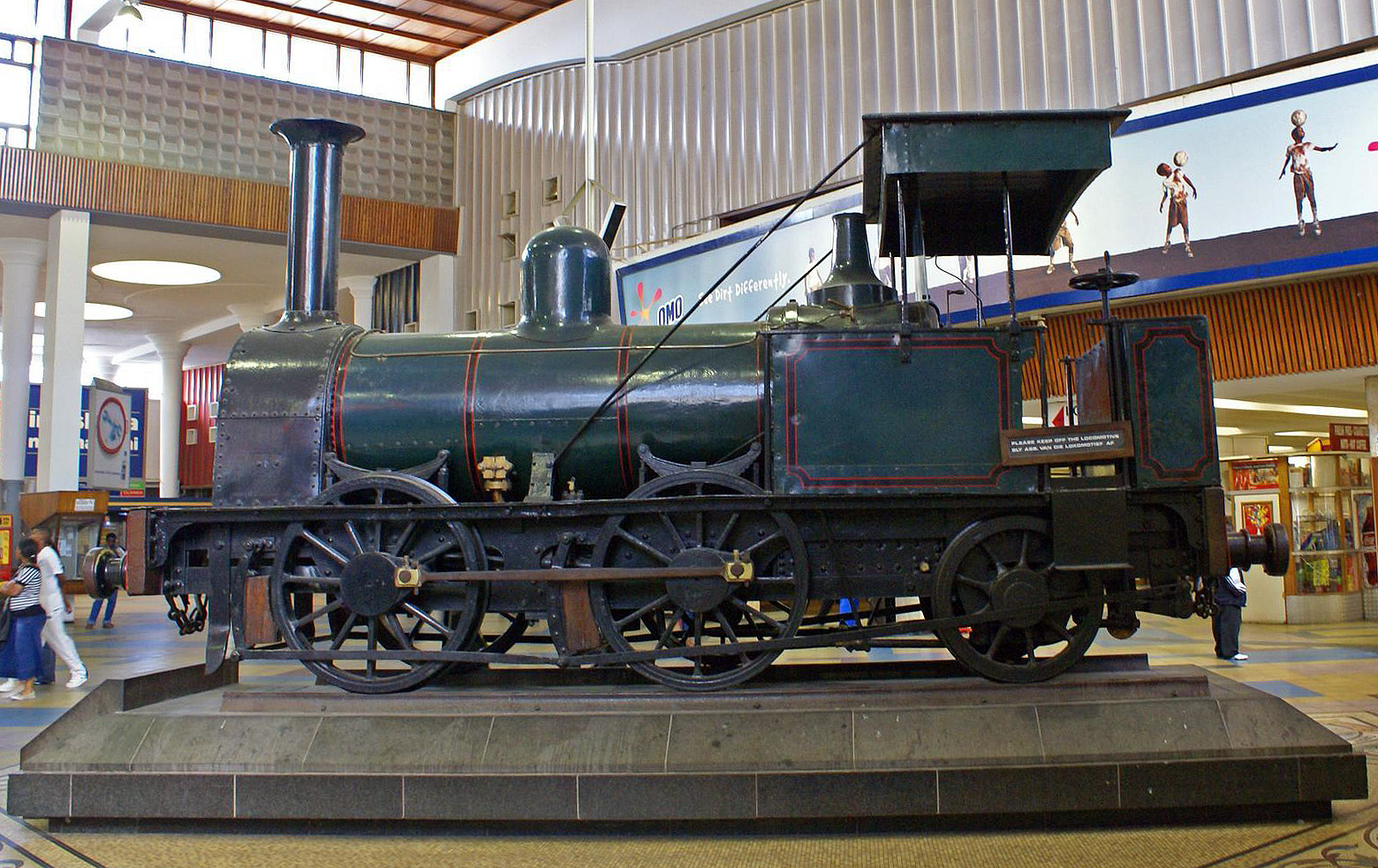
Blackie, the first locomotive in South Africa, later rebuilt to 0-4-2T

In September 1859 Messrs. E. & J. Pickering, contractors to the Cape Town Railway and Dock Company for the construction of the Cape Town-Wellington railway line, imported a small 4 ft 8 1/2 in (1,435 mm) broad gauge 0-4-0 side-tank steam locomotive from England for use during the construction of the railway. This was the first locomotive in South Africa. In 1874 the locomotive was rebuilt to a 0-4-2T configuration before it was shipped to Port Alfred, where it served as construction locomotive on the banks of the Kowie river and was nicknamed Blackie. It has been declared a heritage object and was plinthed in the main concourse of Cape Town station.

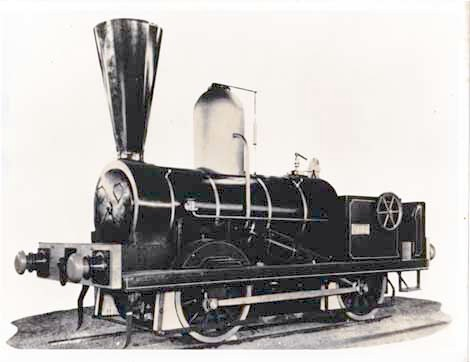
Natal plinthed at Durban station

The first railway locomotive to run in revenue earning service in South Africa was a small broad gauge 0-4-0WT well tank engine named Natal, manufactured by Carrett, Marshall and Company of Leeds. It made its inaugural run from Market Square to Point station in Durban during the official opening of the first operating railway in South Africa on 26 June 1860.

In 1865, the Natal Railway Company obtained a saddle-tank locomotive with a 0-4-0 wheel arrangement from Kitson and Company. This was the Natal Railway's second locomotive and was named Durban.

In 1878, while construction work by the Kowie Harbour Improvement Company was underway at Port Alfred, the Cape Government Railways acquired one broad gauge 0-4-0ST (Saddle Tank) locomotive named Aid from Fox, Walker and Company of Bristol for use as construction locomotive on the east bank of the Kowie river.

==== Cape gauge ====
During the late 19th and early 20th centuries, a number of 0-4-0 tank- and saddle-tank locomotives were imported into South Africa, many of them for use in harbours. Many of these locomotives came into South African Railways (SAR) stock in 1912, but were never classified.

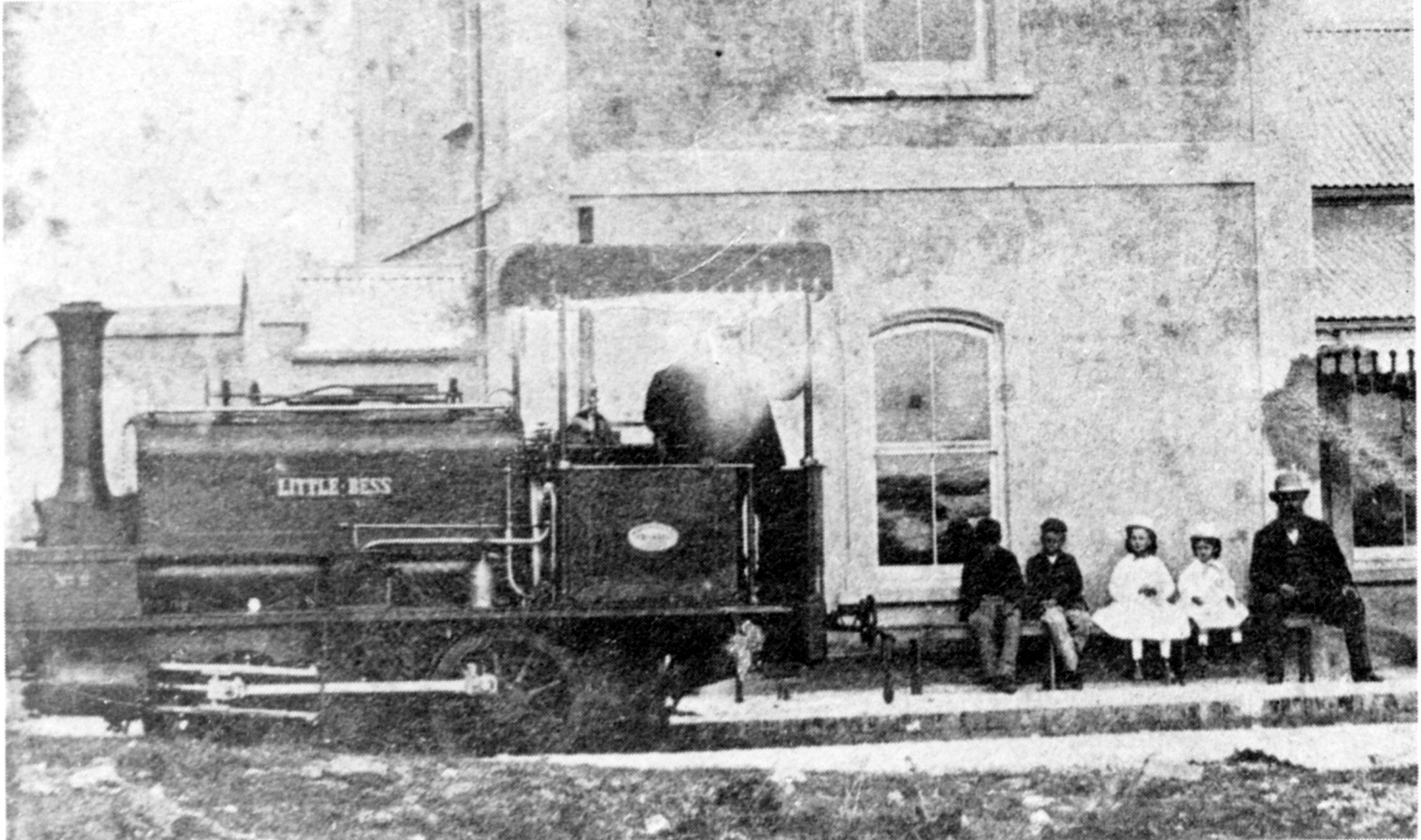
No. M2 Little Bess of 1873

- In 1873 and 1874, three Cape gauge saddle-tank locomotives, built by Manning Wardle, were placed in service by the Cape Government Railways, two on the Midland System in 1873 and the third on the Western System in 1874. They were the first Cape gauge locomotives to enter service in South Africa.
- In 1874, a third saddle-tank locomotive, also built by Manning Wardle, was delivered to the Midland System of the CGR in Port Elizabeth. The locomotive was of a smaller design than the earlier locomotives of 1873.
- Between 1875 and 1882, six saddle-tank locomotives with domeless boilers and three with domes were placed in service on all three systems of the CGR. They were all designated First Class when a classification system was adopted.
- In 1881, two Cape gauge saddle tank locomotives with a 0-4-0 wheel arrangement were placed in service by Teague and Company, who operated Teague's Tramway at the Kimberley diamond mine. In 1885 one was sold to the mine and the other to the CGR for use during the construction of a temporary rail bridge across the Orange River at Norvalspont. In the process the CGR locomotive, nicknamed Coffee Pot, became the first locomotive to run across the border between the Cape Colony and the Orange Free State.
- Thirteen saddle-tank locomotives were acquired by the Table Bay Harbour Board from Black, Hawthorn and Company, Chapman and Furneaux and Hawthorn Leslie and Company between 1881 and 1904. Eleven survived to come into SAR stock in 1912, but were not included in the renumbering schedules or classified.

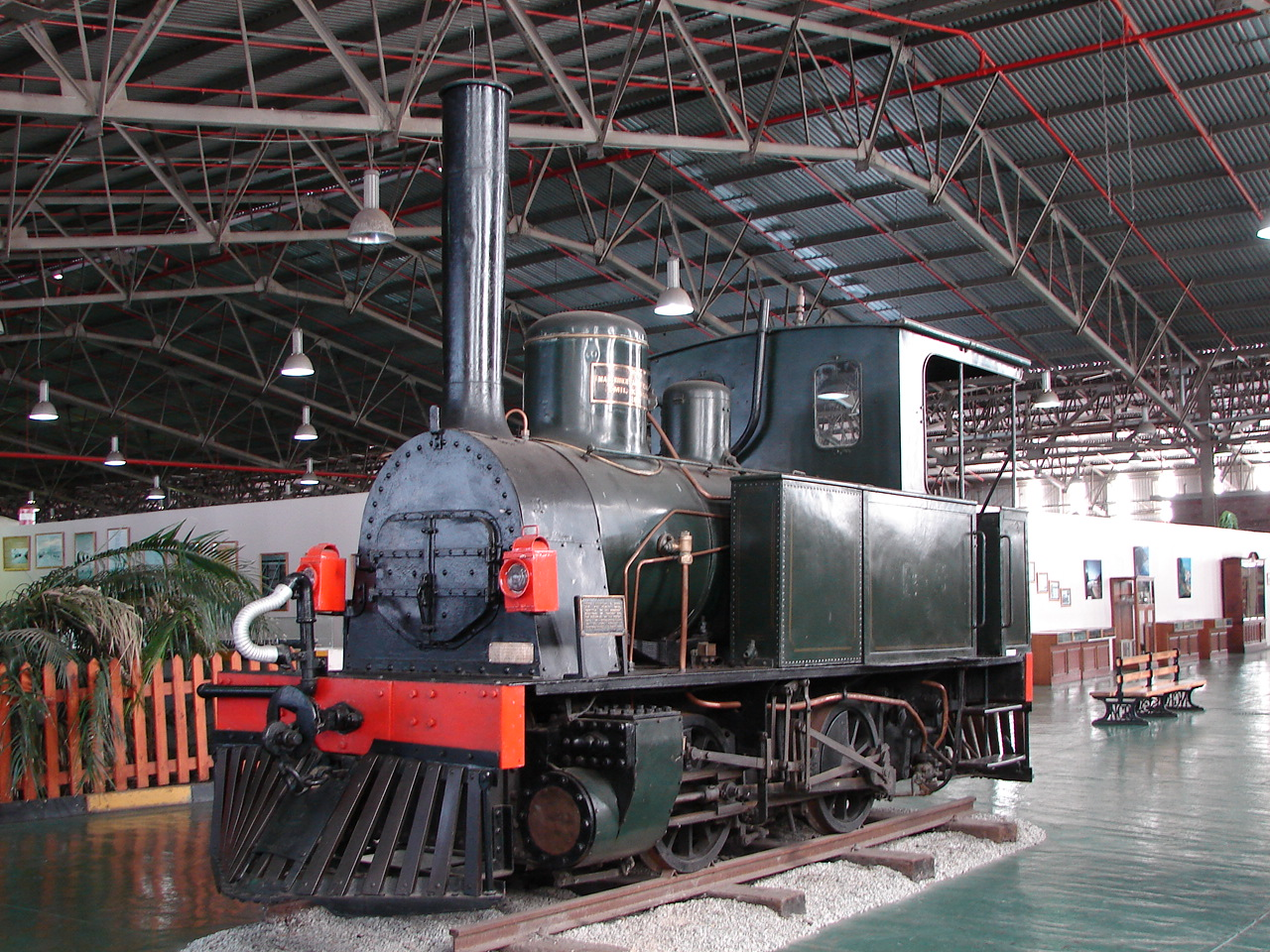
NZASM 14 Tonner 0-4-0T

- In 1889 the Nederlandsche-Zuid-Afrikaansche Spoorwegmaatschappij (NZASM) obtained its first six locomotives for use on the new line which was being constructed from Johannesburg to Boksburg, one 13 Tonner and five very similar 14 Tonners.
- In 1889 and 1890 the NZASM obtained three 10 Tonner tramway locomotives for use on the new line from Johannesburg to Boksburg which became known as the Randtram line.
- In 1891 five saddle-tank locomotives were imported, built by Neilson and Company for the Natal Government Railways (NGR). One was later sold to the Pretoria-Pietersburg Railway (PPR), where it was named Natal, while two more went to the Durban Harbour. The remaining two were later included in the NGR's Class K. In 1912, four of these locomotives survived, including the ex-PPR locomotive, to be taken onto the SAR roster as obsolete unclassified locomotives.
- Between 1894 and 1902 eight saddle-tank locomotives were acquired by the Port Elizabeth Harbour Board for shunting service at the Port Elizabeth Harbour, four built by Black, Hawthorn in 1894 and 1895, two by Chapman and Furneaux in 1900 and two by Hudswell, Clarke in 1902.

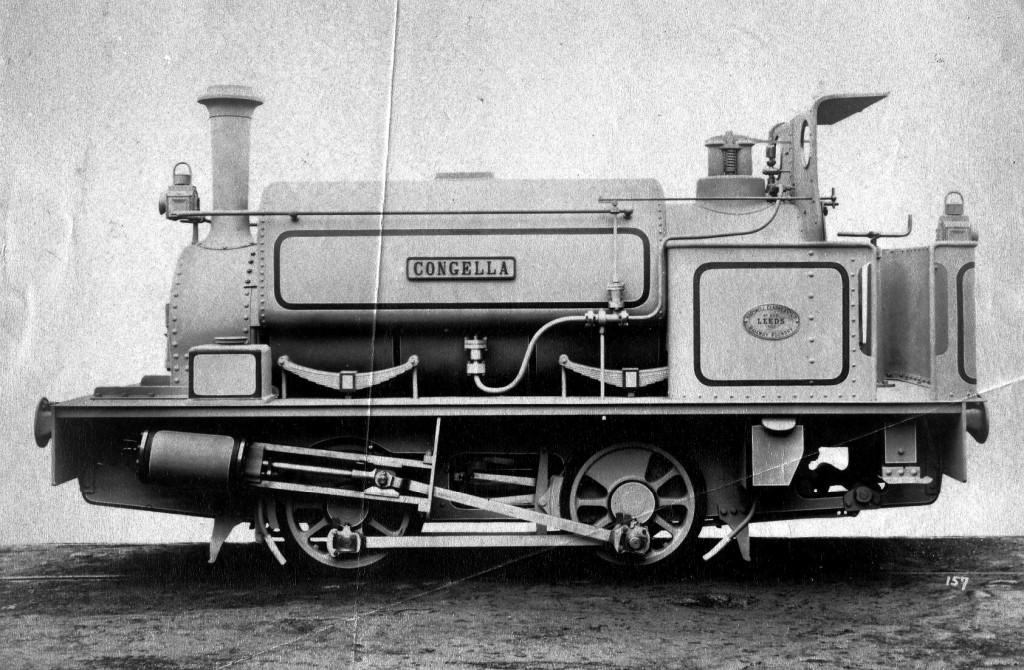
Durban Harbour's Congella

- In 1902 the Harbours Department of the Natal Government placed a single 0-4-0 saddle-tank locomotive in service as harbour shunter in Durban Harbour. It was built by Hudswell, Clarke and named Congella.
- In 1903, a single 0-4-0ST locomotive, built by New Lowca Engineering, was delivered to the Port Elizabeth Harbour Board.
- After the Harbour Boards were disbanded, some locomotives entered SAR harbour service as previously owned. Two locomotives named Stormberg and Thebus were originally built by Hudswell Clarke for the South African Public Works Department in 1903. They were acquired by the SAR in 1916, but were named instead of being classified and numbered.
- The CGR acquired a single self-contained Railmotor with a 0-4-0T+4 wheel arrangement for low-volume passenger service. The railmotor was a 0-4-0 side-tank locomotive with a passenger coach as an integral part of the locomotive itself, with a four-wheeled bogie under the coach end.

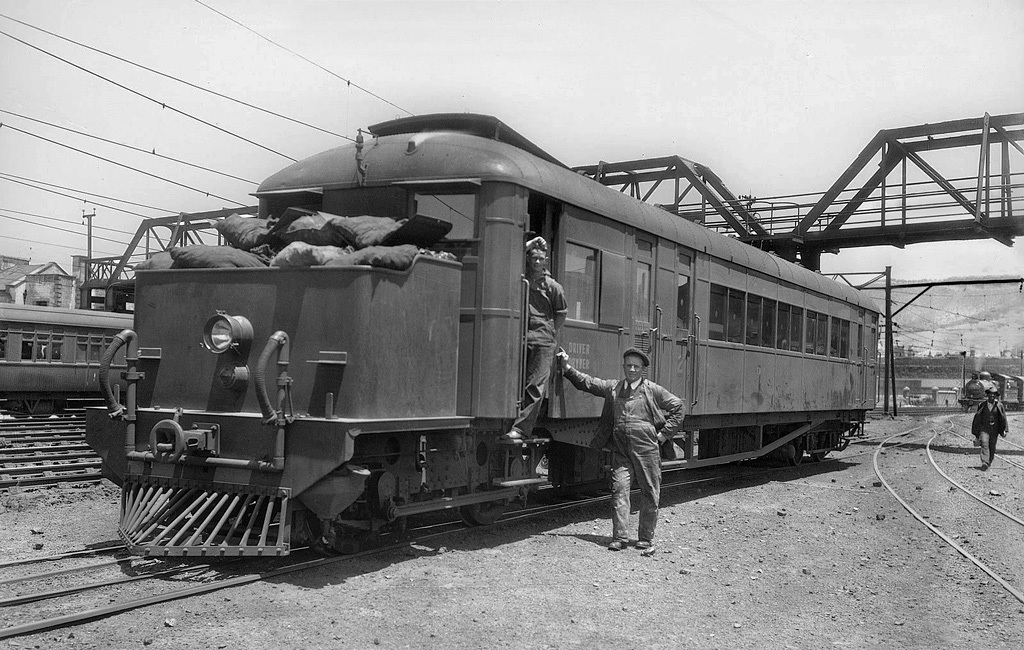
Clayton railmotor

- In 1907, the Central South African Railways also acquired a single self-contained Railmotor with a 0-4-0T+4 wheel arrangement.
- In 1929, the South African Railways acquired a single self-contained Clayton railmotor with a 0-4-0+4 wheel arrangement for low-volume passenger service. The vehicle was a vertical boilered steam locomotive with a passenger coach which was an integral part of the locomotive itself.
- In 1941, long after the Harbour Boards had ceased to exist, a contractor's locomotive which had been imported c. 1939 for use on the Foreshore land reclamation project in Cape Town was bought by the SAR for use as dock shunter in Table Bay Harbour. It had been built in 1909 by Orenstein & Koppel and on the SAR it was numbered SAR-H&NW no. 69.

==== Narrow gauges ====
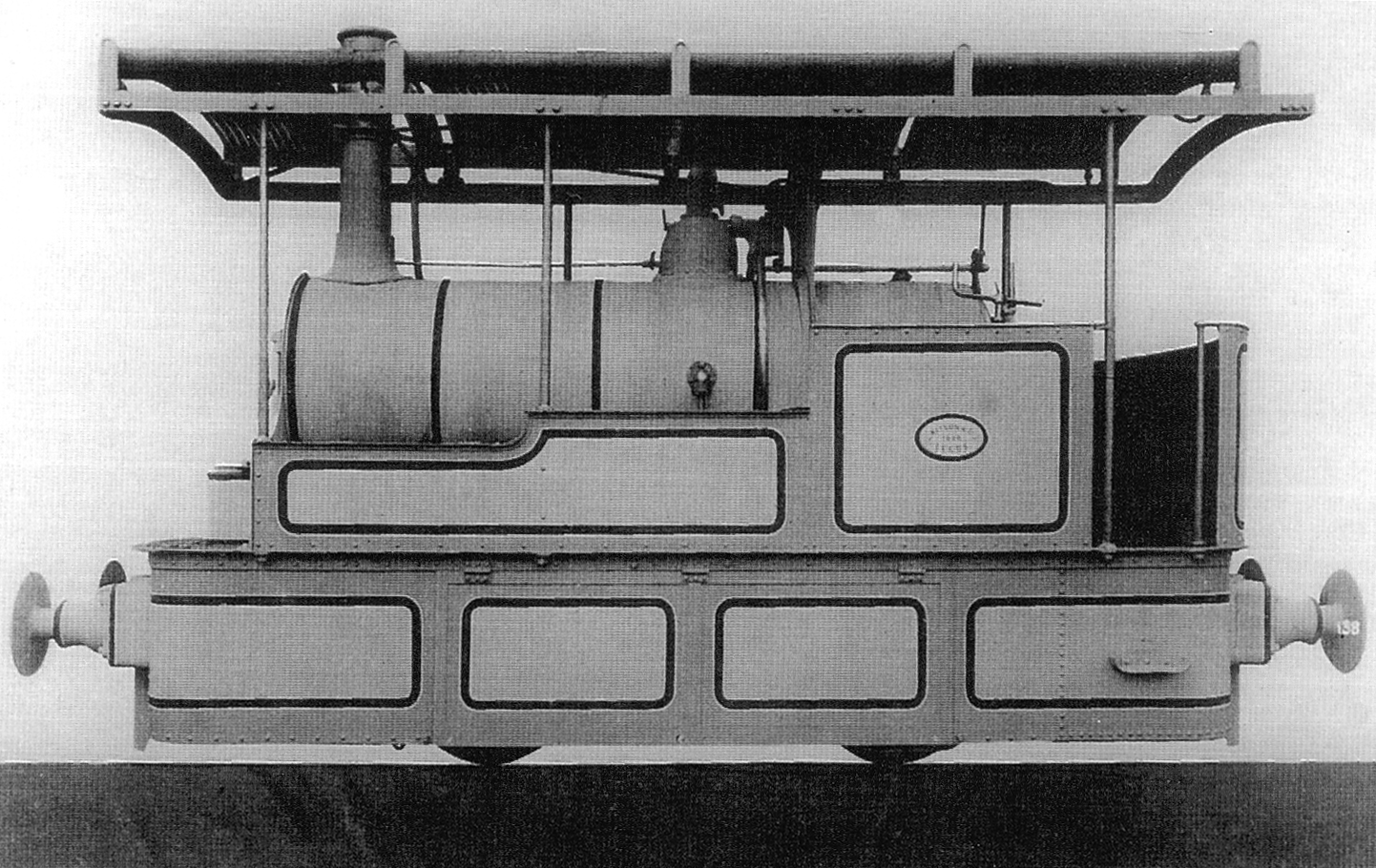
Cape Copper Company Condenser no. T198 John Taylor

Between 1886 and 1888, three well-tank condensing locomotives were placed in service by the Cape Copper Mining Company on its 2 ft 6 in (762 mm) Namaqualand Railway between Port Nolloth and O'okiep in the Cape Colony. They were the first condensing steam locomotives to enter service in South Africa. They were later rebuilt as conventional well-tank locomotives.

In 1899, Rand Mines acquired two narrow gauge tank steam locomotives from Avonside Engine Company and in 1900 a similar locomotive was delivered to Reynolds Brothers Sugar Estates in Natal. In 1915, when an urgent need arose for additional narrow gauge locomotives in German South West Africa during the First World War, these three locomotives were purchased second-hand by the South African Railways.

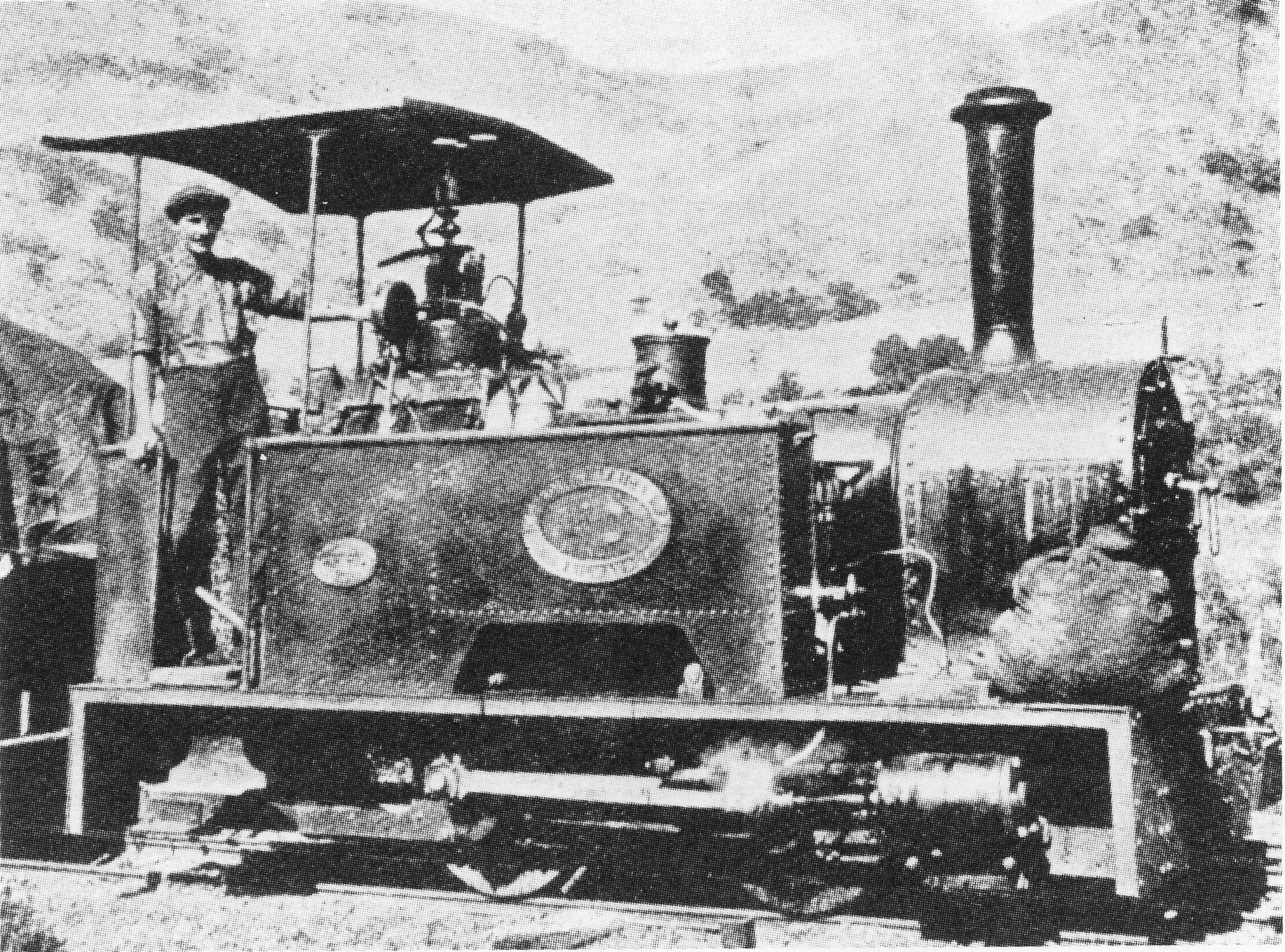
SAR Class NG1 number 40

In 1900 the British War Office placed two Sirdar class 0-4-0T tank steam locomotives in service on a 2 ft (610 mm) narrow gauge line near Germiston in the Zuid-Afrikaansche Republiek, where the Royal Engineers had established a siege park during the Second Boer War. The locomotives were built by Kerr, Stuart and Company. At the end of the war, the two Sirdar locomotives were sold to a farmer, who used them on a firewood line between Pienaarsrivier and Pankop, until the line and locomotives were taken over by the Central South African Railways (CSAR). In 1912, when these locomotives were assimilated into the SAR, they were renumbered with an "NG" prefix to their numbers. When a system of grouping narrow gauge locomotives into classes was eventually introduced by the SAR somewhere between 1928 and 1930, they were designated Class NG1.

In 1902, the CGR placed a single narrow gauge tank steam locomotive in service on the Avontuur branch, built by Manning Wardle, classified Type C and named Midget. In 1912, this locomotive was assimilated into the South African Railways and renumbered. It was sold to the West Rand Consolidated Mines near Krugersdorp in 1921.

A single small five-ton locomotive, built by Krauss & Company, was purchased by the CGR c. 1903 and placed in service as construction engine on the narrow gauge Avontuur branch out of Port Elizabeth.

=== United Kingdom ===
==== Tank locomotives ====
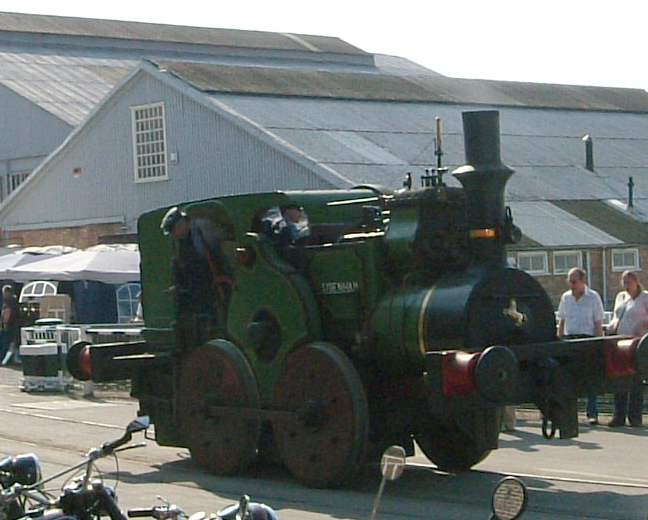
Aveling & Porter Loco, Chatham Dockyard

The tank engine versions of the wheel arrangement began to appear in the United Kingdom in the early 1850s, with the first significant class being six saddle tanks designed by Robert Sinclair for the Caledonian Railway.

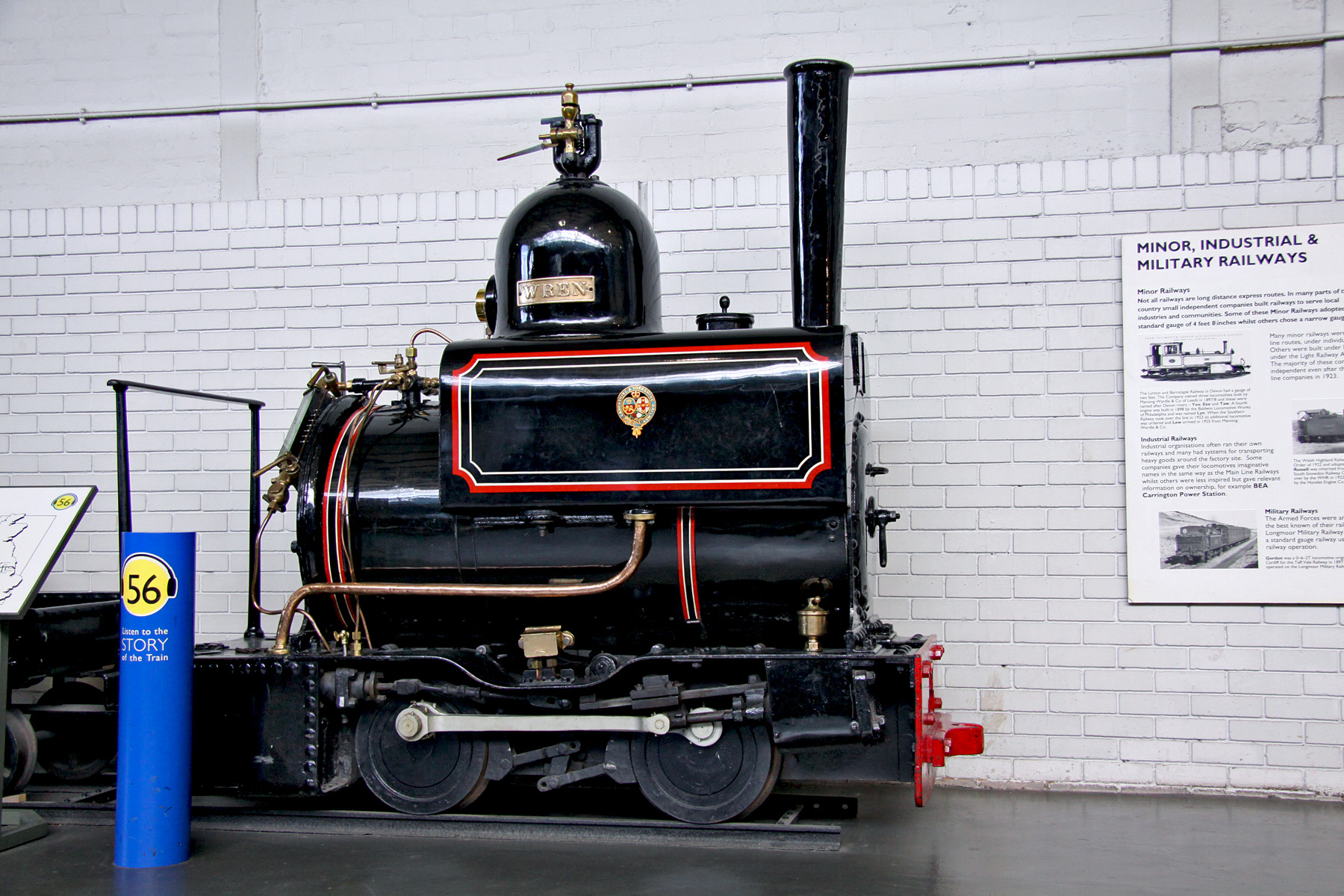
Lancashire and Yorkshire Railway 0-4-0ST locomotive WREN

By 1860 the type was very popular and it continued to be built in significant numbers for both mainline and industrial railways, almost to the end of steam traction. Hudswell Clarke were supplying industrial saddle tanks until at least 1947, and both Barclay and Robert Stephenson and Hawthorns until 1949.

An interesting variation on this theme were the traction engine-based railway locomotives built by Aveling and Porter.

The last British Railways 0-4-0ST dock shunters were built by Horwich Works as late as 1955 and survived until 1966.

==== Tender locomotives ====
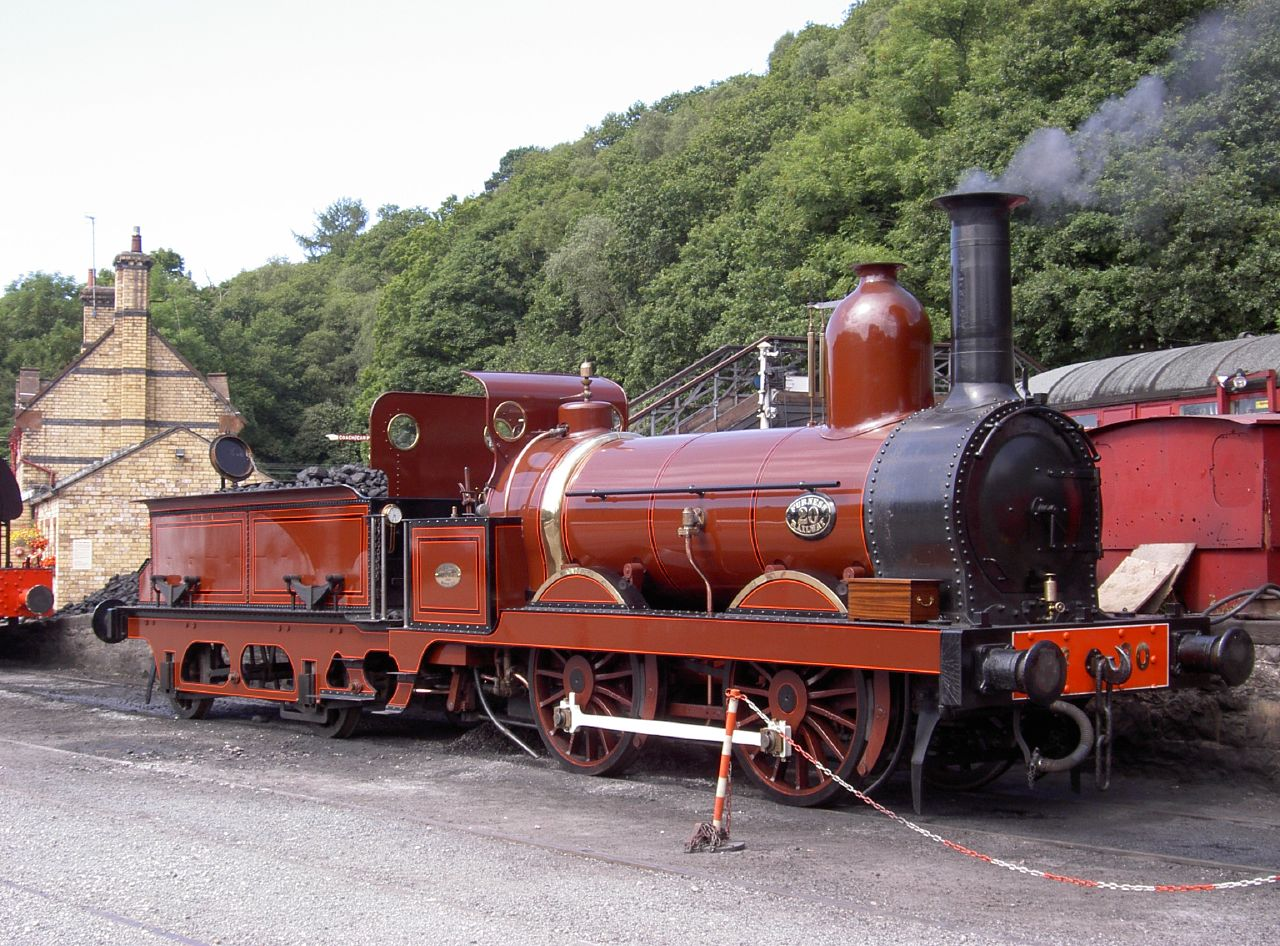
Furness Railway Locomotive No. 20, 1863

During the 1840s, the wheel arrangement was widely used by Edward Bury on the bar-framed locomotives built for the London and Birmingham Railway. However, with the exception of a few isolated examples used by the smaller companies such as the Cambrian Railways, the Furness Railway and the Taff Vale Railway, and four examples built by Edward Fletcher (engineer) of the North Eastern Railway between 1854 and 1868, the 0-4-0 tender locomotive had been largely superseded on Britain's mainline railways by 1850.

=== United States ===
==== Tank locomotives ====
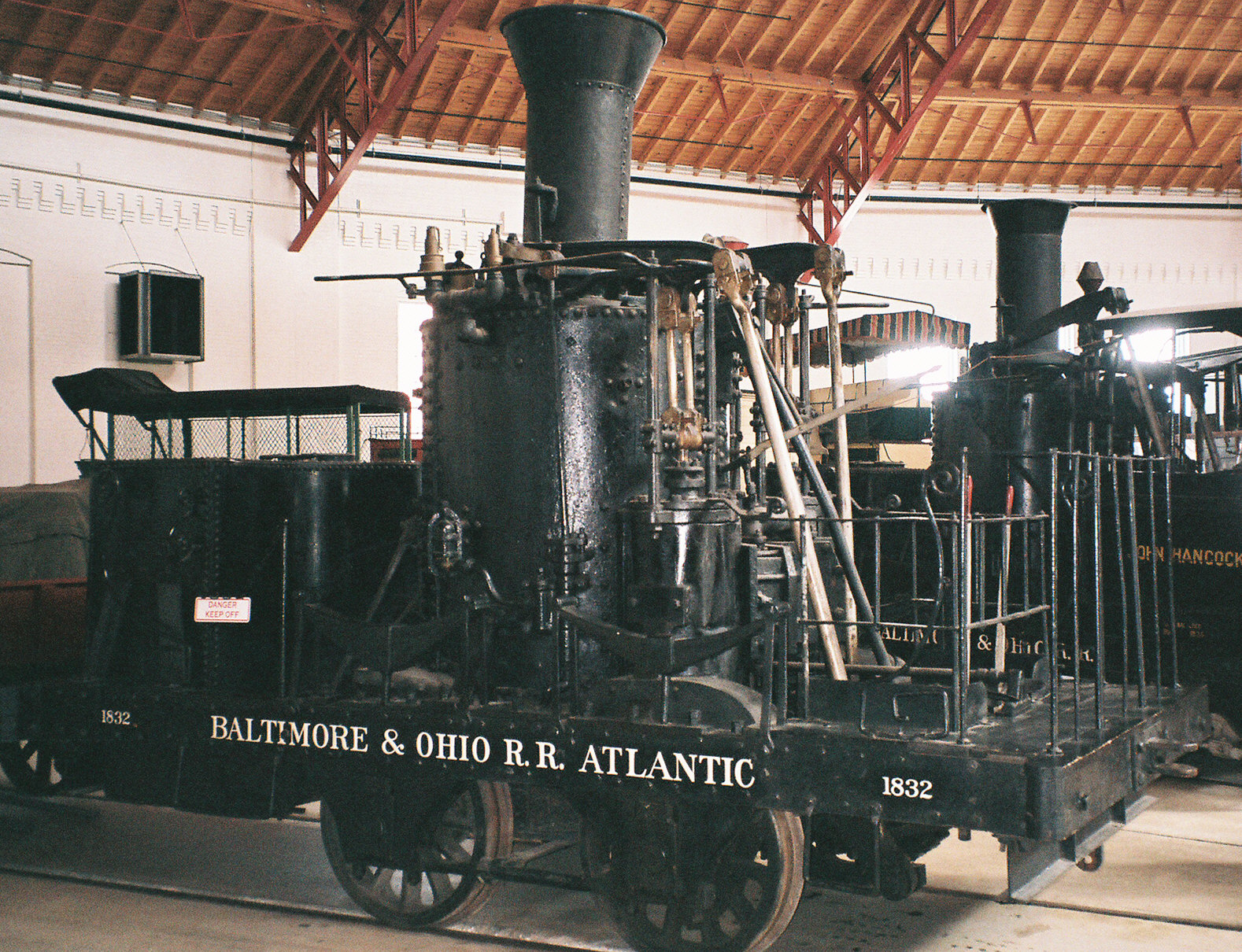
Baltimore and Ohio Railroad 0-4-0VB Atlantic no. 2 1832, the Grasshopper at the National Museum of Railroad History & Innovation

An early example of the 0-4-0 vertical boiler type was the Baltimore and Ohio Railroad's Atlantic No. 2, built in 1832 by Phineas Davis and Israel Gartner. In the United States, the 0-4-0 tank locomotive was principally used for industrial railway purposes.

==== Tender locomotives ====
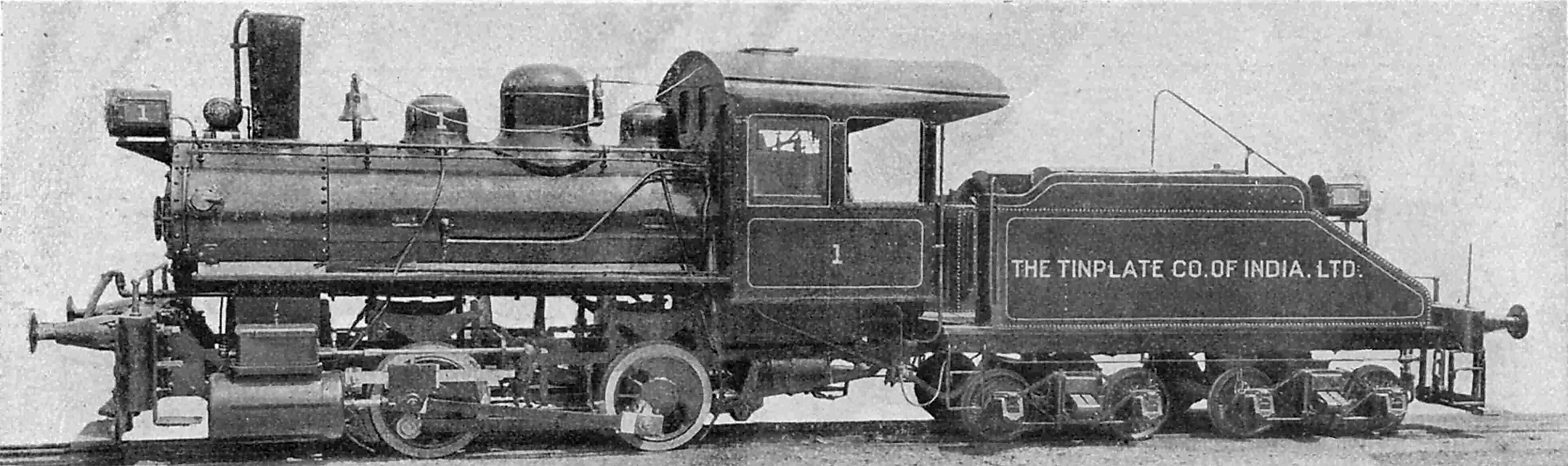
0-4-0 United States-built tender locomotive

In the United States, the Best Friend of Charleston was the first locomotive to be built entirely within the United States. It was built in 1830 for the South Carolina Canal and Rail Road Company by the West Point Foundry of New York.

The John Bull was built by Robert Stephenson and Company for the Camden and Amboy Railroad in New Jersey in 1831, but was later rebuilt as a 4-2-0.

The Pennsylvania Railroad kept producing 0-4-0 classes long after all other major railroads had abandoned development of the type, building their final A5s class into the 1920s. The A5s was a monster among 0-4-0s, larger than many 0-6-0 designs, with modern features found on few others of its type, such as superheating, power reverse, and piston valves. The Pennsy continued to build the type because it had a large amount of confined and tight industrial track, more than most other railroads had.

== 0-4-0 diesel locomotives ==
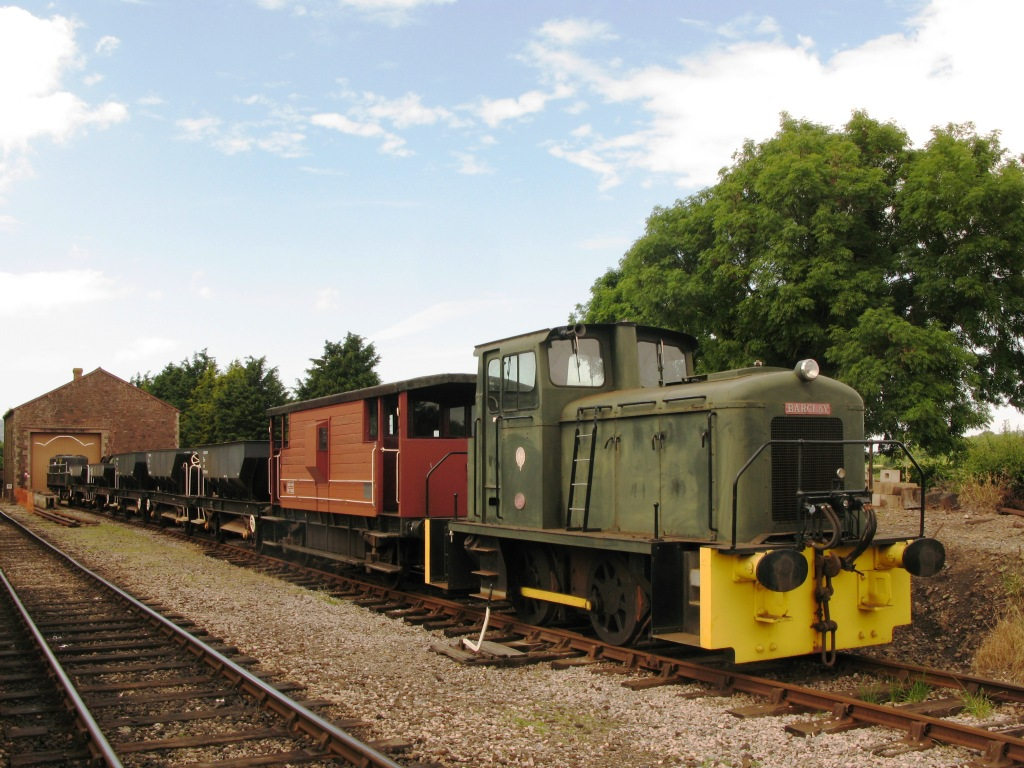
Andrew Barclay 0-4-0 diesel number 579 of 1972

The wheel arrangement was also used on a number of small 0-4-0DM diesel-mechanical shunters produced by John Fowler & Co. and other builders in the 1930s and earlier. Similarly, it was perpetuated on a number of diesel-mechanical and 0-4-0DH diesel-hydraulic classes between 1953 and 1960 (see the List of British Rail modern traction locomotive classes). Many of these were later sold for industrial use.

There are 0-4-0DE diesel-electric locomotives too, although small in number. The smallest diesel switchers, such as the EMD Model 40, were of this arrangement.

0-4-0 diesel-mechanical shunters are also Polish PKP class SM02 and PKP class SM03 and narrow gauge WLs40/50.
