= South African Dock Shunter 0-4-0T =

1909 design of steam locomotive

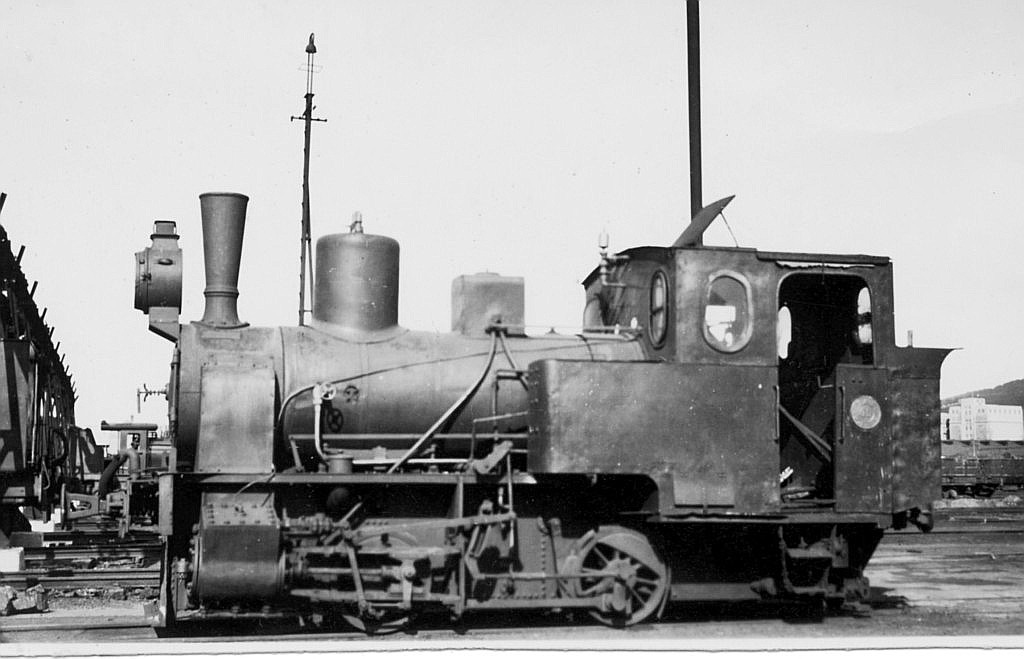
- Harbour shunter no. 69, Paardeneiland, 15 July 1951
Type and origin
- Power type: Steam
- Designer: Orenstein & Koppel
- Builder: Orenstein & Koppel
- Serial number: 3019
- Build date: 1909
Specifications
- Configuration
  - Whyte: 0-4-0T
  - UIC: Bn2t
- Gauge: 900 mm (2 ft 11 7/16 in) as built 3 ft 6 in (1,067 mm) Cape gauge regauged
- Coupled dia.: 29 in (737 mm)
- Wheelbase: 6 ft (1,829 mm)
- Length
  - Over couplers: 19 ft 6 in (5,944 mm)
- Width: 8 ft (2,438 mm)
- Height: 10 ft 6 in (3,200 mm)
- Frame type: Plate
- Loco weight: 16 LT 10 cwt (16,760 kg) empty
- Fuel type: Coal
- Firebox
  - Type: Round-top
- Boiler pressure: 170 psi (1,172 kPa)
- Cylinders: Two
- Valve gear: Walschaerts
- Couplers: Johnston link-and-pin
Performance figures
- Power output: 140 hp (100 kW)
- Tractive effort: 9,100 lbf (40 kN)
Career
- Operators: Hollandse Anneming Maatschappij; South African Railways
- Number in class: 1
- Numbers: 69
- Delivered: 1939 (Contractors), 1941 (SAR)
- First run: 1909
- Withdrawn: 1950s

The South African Railways Dock Shunter 0-4-0T of 1909 was a steam locomotive.

A single second-hand 0-4-0T locomotive was bought by the South African Railways in 1941 and employed as harbour shunting engine in Cape Town. The engine had, until then, been used as construction locomotive by the contractors who undertook the construction of the new Table Bay harbour.

== Origin ==
When the old Table Bay harbour in Cape Town became inadequate to cope with the vast increase in shipping, a contract was awarded to the Hollandse Anneming Maatschappij Eiendoms Beperk to construct a new harbour. Work to reclaim ground on the Foreshore, dredge the New Basin and build new and deeper docks began in 1938. The contractors brought out a small 0-4-0T locomotive to use on site for general haulage work. The locomotive's arrival date is not known, but it was removed from Dutch boiler records in October 1939.

The locomotive had been built by Orenstein & Koppel in Berlin in 1909, originally as a 140 horsepower (100 kilowatts) 900 mm (2 ft 11 7/16 in) gauge locomotive for the Fix Söhne Bauunternehmung in Meiderich. It was later regauged to 3 ft 6 in (1,067 mm) Cape gauge and transferred or sold to the Dutch contractors.

== Service ==
In 1940, the South African Railways bought the locomotive from the contractors out of hand. It was not classified in Railway service, but was numbered 69 and bore cab-side plates lettered "SAR-H&NW". It remained in use as a dock shunter in Table Bay harbour into the 1950s.
