= CGR 1st Class 0-4-0ST 1876 =

Class of train

CGR 1st Class 0-4-0ST 1876 South African Class 01 0-4-0ST 1876
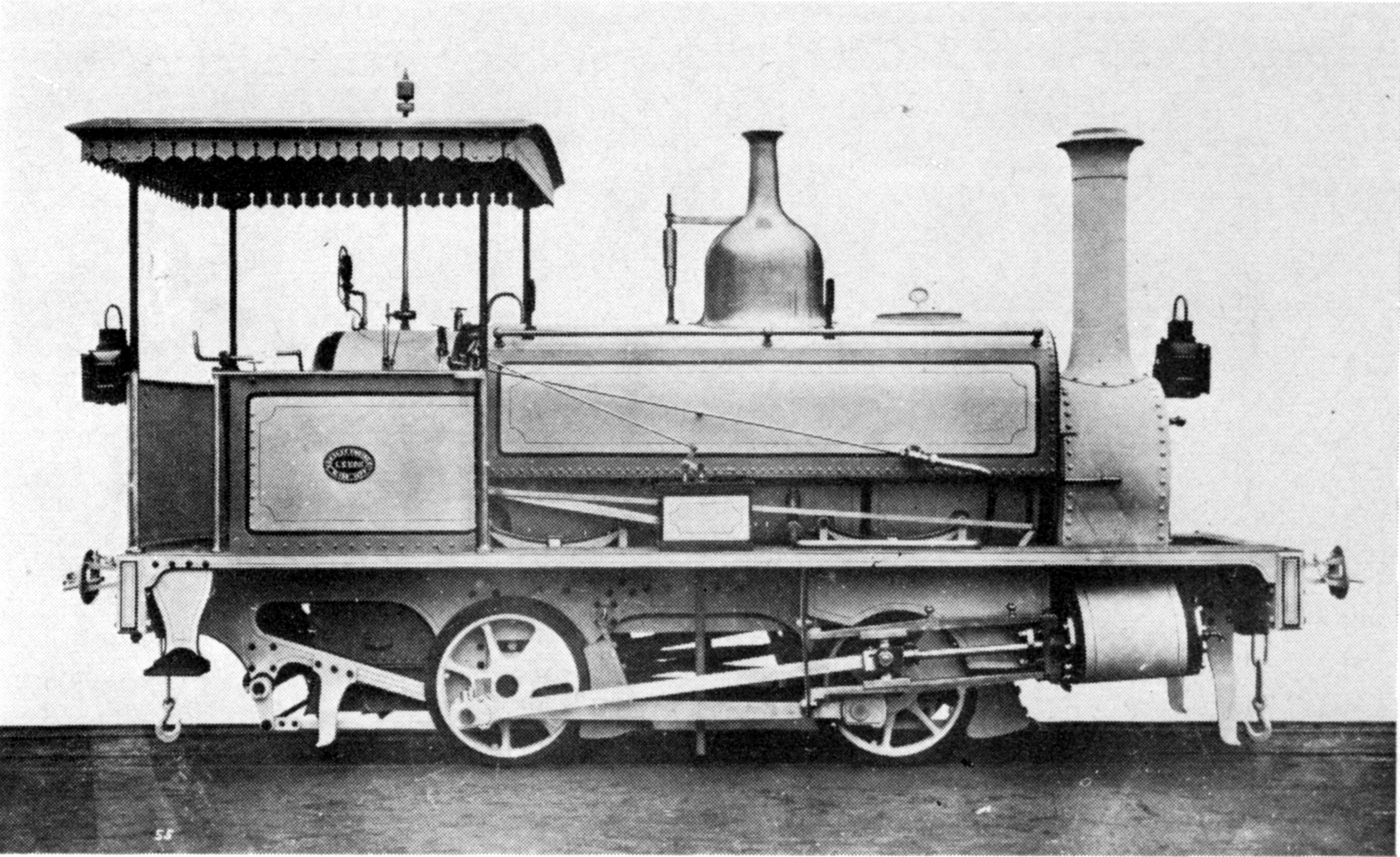
- CGR 1st Class 0-4-0ST of 1876
Type and origin
- Power type: Steam
- Designer: Hunslet Engine Company
- Builder: Hunslet Engine Company
- Serial number: 168, 185-186
- Build date: 1875-1876
Specifications
- Configuration
  - Whyte: 0-4-0ST
  - UIC: Bn2t
- Driver: 2nd coupled axle
- Gauge: 3 ft 6 in (1,067 mm) Cape gauge
- Coupled dia.: 30 in (762 mm)
- Wheelbase: 6 ft (1,829 mm)
- Length
  - Over couplers: 20 ft 9 in (6,325 mm)
- Height: 10 ft (3,048 mm)
- Frame type: Plate
- Adhesive weight: 13 LT 5 cwt (13,460 kg)
- Loco weight: 13 LT 5 cwt (13,460 kg)
- Fuel type: Coal
- Fuel capacity: 15 long hundredweight (0.8 t)
- Water cap.: 280 imp gal (1,300 L)
- Firebox
  - Type: Round-top
  - Grate area: 4.5 sq ft (0.42 m^{2})
- Boiler
  - Pitch: 4 ft 4 1/2 in (1,334 mm)
  - Diameter: 2 ft 5 1/2 in (749 mm) outside
  - Tube plates: 9 ft 6 in (2,896 mm)
- Boiler pressure: 130 psi (896 kPa)
- Safety valve: Salter
- Heating surface
  - Firebox: 30 sq ft (2.8 m^{2})
  - Tubes: 270 sq ft (25 m^{2})
  - Total surface: 300 sq ft (28 m^{2})
- Cylinders: Two
- Cylinder size: 9 1/2 in (241 mm) bore 16 in (406 mm) stroke
- Valve gear: Stephenson
- Valve type: Slide
- Couplers: Johnston link-and-pin
Performance figures
- Tractive effort: 4,693 lbf (20.88 kN) @ 75%
Career
- Operators: Cape Government Railways; South African Railways
- Number in class: 3
- Numbers: E2-E4
- Delivered: 1876-1877
- First run: 1876

The Cape Government Railways 1st Class 0-4-0ST of 1876 was a South African steam locomotive from the pre-Union era in the Cape of Good Hope.

In 1876 and 1877, three Cape gauge 0-4-0ST locomotives were placed in service on the Eastern System of the Cape Government Railways. They were designated 1st Class when a classification system was adopted.

== Manufacturer ==
The Hunslet Engine Company delivered three 0-4-0ST locomotives to the Eastern System of the Cape Government Railways (CGR) in 1876 and 1877. They were similar to the [[CGR 1st Class 0-4-0ST 1875|1st Class 0-4-0ST of 1875]] in most respects, but instead of domeless boilers which took steam from the steam space above the firebox, they had steam domes with large polished brass covers.

The first locomotive arrived in East London in 1876 and was numbered E2. Two more were delivered in 1877, numbered E3 and E4. When a classification system for locomotives was introduced on the CGR, these locomotives were designated 1st Class.

== Service ==
Railway construction out of East London on the Eastern System only began in earnest in 1876. Along with the domeless boilered no. E1, which had arrived in East London in October 1875, these three engines were in all probability also employed as construction locomotives from the outset.

== Works numbers and renumbering ==
By 1888, no. E3 was scrapped and in 1897 no. E2 was sold to the Nederlandsche-Zuid-Afrikaansche Spoorweg-Maatschappij (NZASM), where it was allocated no. 999.

When the Union of South Africa was established on 31 May 1910, the three Colonial government railways (CGR, Natal Government Railways and Central South African Railways) were united under a single administration to control and administer the railways, ports and harbours of the Union. Even though the South African Railways and Harbours came into existence in 1910, the actual classification and renumbering of all the rolling stock of the three constituent railways required careful planning and was only implemented with effect from 1 January 1912.

The sole survivor, no. E4, by then renumbered 602, was considered obsolete by the SAR and was therefore designated Class 01 and renumbered 0602. The works numbers, years in service, original numbers and known renumbering of the 1st Class 0-4-0ST locomotives of 1876 are listed in the table.

CGR 1st Class 0-4-0ST of 1876
Works no.	Year	Loco no.	1888 no.	SAR no.	Notes
168	1876	E2			NZASM 999
185	1877	E3			
186	1877	E4	602	0602	
