= Durban Harbour's Congella =

South-African colonial locomotive

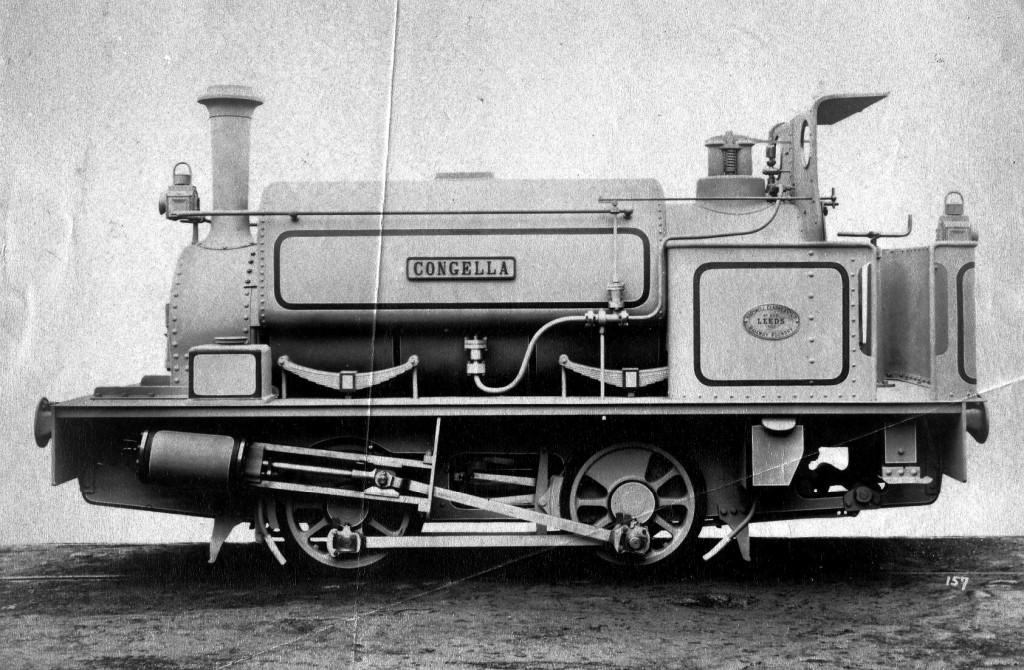
- Natal Harbours Department engine Congella, c. 1902
Type and origin
- Power type: Steam
- Designer: Hudswell, Clarke and Co.
- Builder: Hudswell, Clarke and Co.
- Serial number: 605
- Build date: 1902
Specifications
- Configuration
  - Whyte: 0-4-0ST (Four-coupled)
  - UIC: Bn2t
- Driver: 2nd coupled axle
- Gauge: 3 ft 6 in (1,067 mm) Cape gauge
- Coupled dia.: 33 1/2 in (851 mm)
- Wheelbase: 5 ft 6 in (1,676 mm)
- Length
  - Over couplers: 20 ft 5 in (6,223 mm)
  - Over beams: 17 ft 11 in (5,461 mm)
- Height: 9 ft 10 1/4 in (3,004 mm)
- Adhesive weight: 12 LT 8 cwt (12,600 kg)
- Loco weight: 12 LT 8 cwt (12,600 kg)
- Fuel type: Coal
- Fuel capacity: 10 long hundredweight (0.5 t)
- Water cap.: 390 imp gal (1,770 L)
- Firebox
  - Type: Round-top
  - Grate area: 5.6 sq ft (0.52 m^{2})
- Boiler
  - Pitch: 4 ft 9 3/4 in (1,467 mm)
  - Small tubes: 58: 2 in (51 mm)
- Boiler pressure: 160 psi (1,103 kPa)
- Safety valve: Ramsbottom
- Heating surface
  - Firebox: 33.22 sq ft (3.086 m^{2})
  - Tubes: 254.44 sq ft (23.638 m^{2})
  - Total surface: 287.66 sq ft (26.724 m^{2})
- Cylinders: Two
- Cylinder size: 10 in (254 mm) bore 16 in (406 mm) stroke
- Valve gear: Stephenson
- Couplers: Johnston link-and-pin
Performance figures
- Tractive effort: 5,731 lbf (25.49 kN) @ 75%
Career
- Operators: Harbours Department of Natal
- Number in class: 1
- Official name: Congella
- Delivered: 1902
- First run: 1902

Durban Harbour's Congella of 1902 was a South African steam locomotive from the pre-Union era in the Colony of Natal.

In 1902, the Harbours Department of the Natal Government placed a single 0–4–0 saddle-tank locomotive named Congella in service as dock shunting engine in Durban Harbour.

== Port Advisory Board ==
In 1898, a Port Advisory Board was established in Durban, consisting of seven members who represented the Colonial Government as well as commercial and municipal entities. The board was responsible for the management, control, improvement, development and maintenance of the facilities at Durban Harbour.

Railway operations in the harbour became the responsibility of the Harbours Department of the Government of Natal.

== Manufacturer ==
In 1902, the Natal Harbours Department placed a single 0-4-0ST locomotive in service at Durban Harbour. It was built by Hudswell, Clarke and Company of Leeds and was not numbered, but named Congella.

== Service ==
The locomotive's fate is unknown. Congella was not in service at the harbour when South African Railways and Harbours' classification and renumbering scheme was enacted in 1912.
