= NZASM 13 Tonner 0-4-0T =

Type of steam locomotive

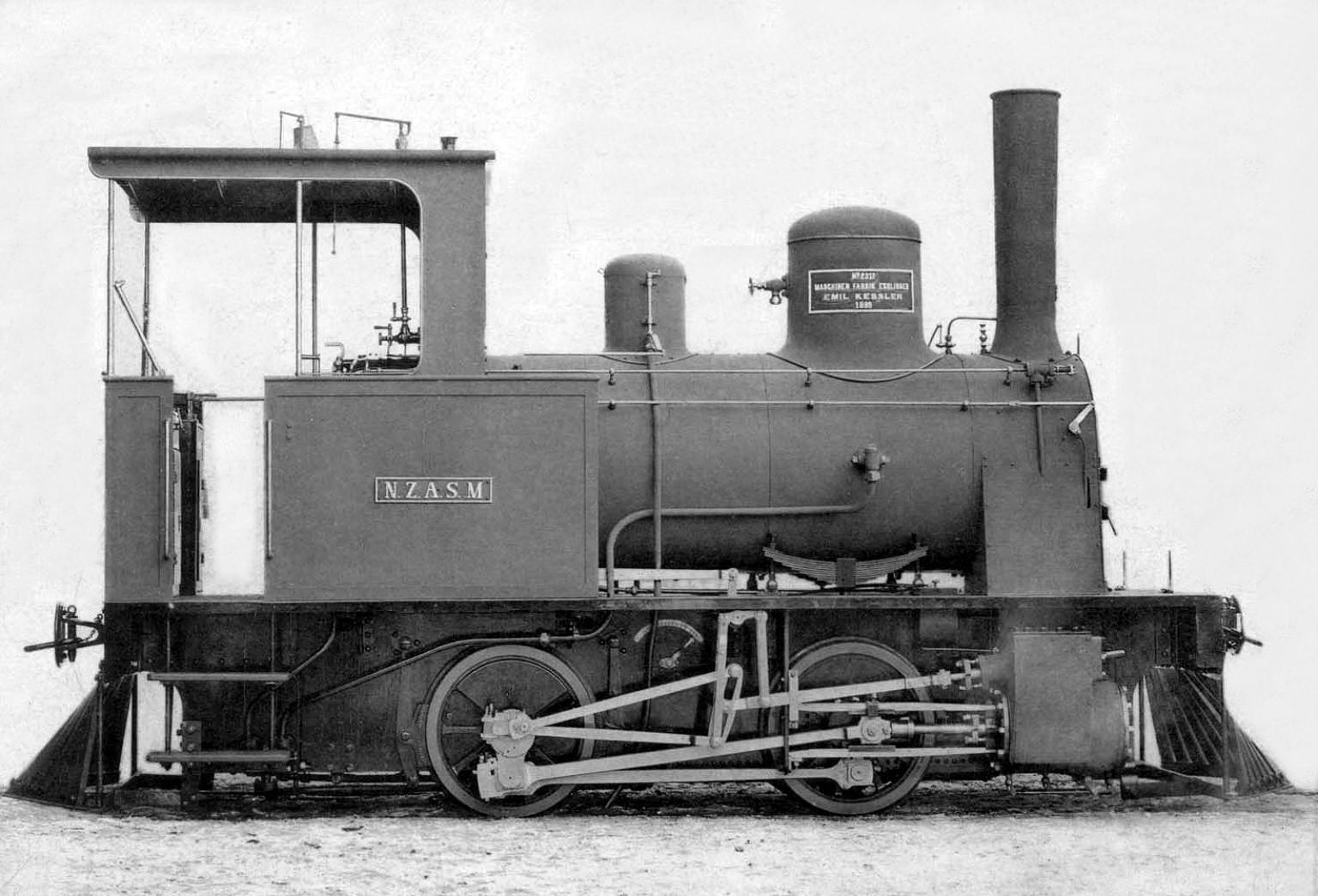
- 13 Tonner, c. 1889
Type and origin
- Power type: Steam
- Designer: Maschinenfabrik Esslingen
- Builder: Maschinenfabrik Esslingen
- Serial number: 2311
- Build date: 1889
- Total produced: 1
Specifications
- Configuration
  - Whyte: 0-4-0T
  - UIC: Bn2t
- Driver: 2nd coupled axle
- Gauge: 3 ft 6 in (1,067 mm) Cape gauge
- Coupled dia.: 31 1/2 in (800 mm)
- Wheelbase: 5 ft 3 in (1,600 mm)
- Length
  - Over couplers: 16 ft 10 7/8 in (5,153 mm)
- Height: 11 ft 2 in (3,404 mm)
- Frame type: Plate
- Adhesive weight: 13 LT (13,210 kg)
- Loco weight: 13 LT (13,210 kg)
- Fuel type: Coal
- Fuel capacity: 5 long hundredweight (0.3 t)
- Water cap.: 300 imp gal (1,400 L)
- Firebox
  - Type: Round-top
  - Grate area: 7.1 sq ft (0.66 m^{2})
- Boiler
  - Pitch: 5 ft 4 1/2 in (1,638 mm)
  - Diameter: 3 ft 1 5/16 in (948 mm)
  - Tube plates: 6 ft 8 11/16 in (2,049 mm)
  - Small tubes: 88: 1 3/4 in (44 mm)
- Boiler pressure: 160 psi (1,103 kPa)
- Heating surface
  - Firebox: 34 sq ft (3.2 m^{2})
  - Tubes: 271 sq ft (25.2 m^{2})
  - Total surface: 305 sq ft (28.3 m^{2})
- Cylinders: Two
- Cylinder size: 11 in (279 mm) bore 15 3/4 in (400 mm) stroke
- Valve gear: Allan
- Valve type: Slide
- Couplers: Johnston link-and-pin
Performance figures
- Tractive effort: 5,150 lbf (22.9 kN) @ 75%
Career
- Operators: NZASM
- Class: NZASM 13 Tonner
- Number in class: 1
- Official name: 13 Tonner
- Delivered: 1889
- First run: 1889

The NZASM 13 Tonner 0-4-0T of 1889 was a South African steam locomotive from the pre-Union era in the Transvaal.

In 1889, the Nederlandsche-Zuid-Afrikaansche Spoorweg-Maatschappij acquired a single locomotive, very similar to its 14 Tonner locomotives and built by the same manufacturer, but with a smaller water and coal capacity. Since the railway classified its locomotives according to their weight, this well-and-side-tank locomotive was known as the 13 Tonner.

== The Randtram line ==
As a result of the rapid development of the goldfields on the Witwatersrand in the 1880s and the demand for coal by the growing industry, the Volksraad of the Zuid-Afrikaansche Republiek (ZAR), also known as the Transvaal Republic, granted a concession to the Nederlandsche-Zuid-Afrikaansche Spoorwegmaatschappij (Netherlands-South African Railway Company, NZASM) on 20 July 1888 to construct a 16-mile-long (26-kilometre) railway from Johannesburg to Boksburg. The railway, which was opened on 17 March 1890, became known as the Randtram line.

== Manufacturer ==
In 1889, six small 0-4-0T locomotives were delivered to the NZASM by the German engineering firm and locomotive builder Maschinenfabrik Esslingen, owned by Emil Kessler. Five of these were the NZASM 14 Tonners. The sixth, the sole 13 Tonner, was also a well-and-side-tank locomotive with a 0-4-0T wheel arrangement and was similar to, but lighter than the 14 Tonner.

== Characteristics ==
The engine's cylinders were arranged outside the plate frames. The "D" type slide valves, mounted above the cylinders, were arranged at an incline and were actuated by Allan straight link motion. In this type of valve gear, the valve rod and the expansion link are respectively connected to opposing arms on the reversing shaft, so that partial rotation of the shaft moves the link and the die block in opposite directions.

Apart from the side-tanks, the locomotive also had a well-tank between the frames under the boiler barrel. The dome was on the front section of the boiler and the regulator valve was arranged in the smokebox.

== Comparison ==
Compared to the 14 Tonner, the 13 Tonner differed in at least three respects, judging from photographs. The 13 Tonner had a much narrower coal bunker and a shorter chimney. The side-tanks were also much smaller, reaching only as far forward as aft of the boiler-mounted sandbox dome.

On the 14 Tonner, the side-tanks on each side were in two parts and reached as far forward as aft of the steam dome. In addition, the 14 Tonner had two small panels in the side of the rear tank on its right side. The 13 Tonner had no such panels.
