= South African NG 0-4-0T =

1899 narrow-gauge steam locomotive

Rand Mines NG 0-4-0T South African NG 0-4-0T
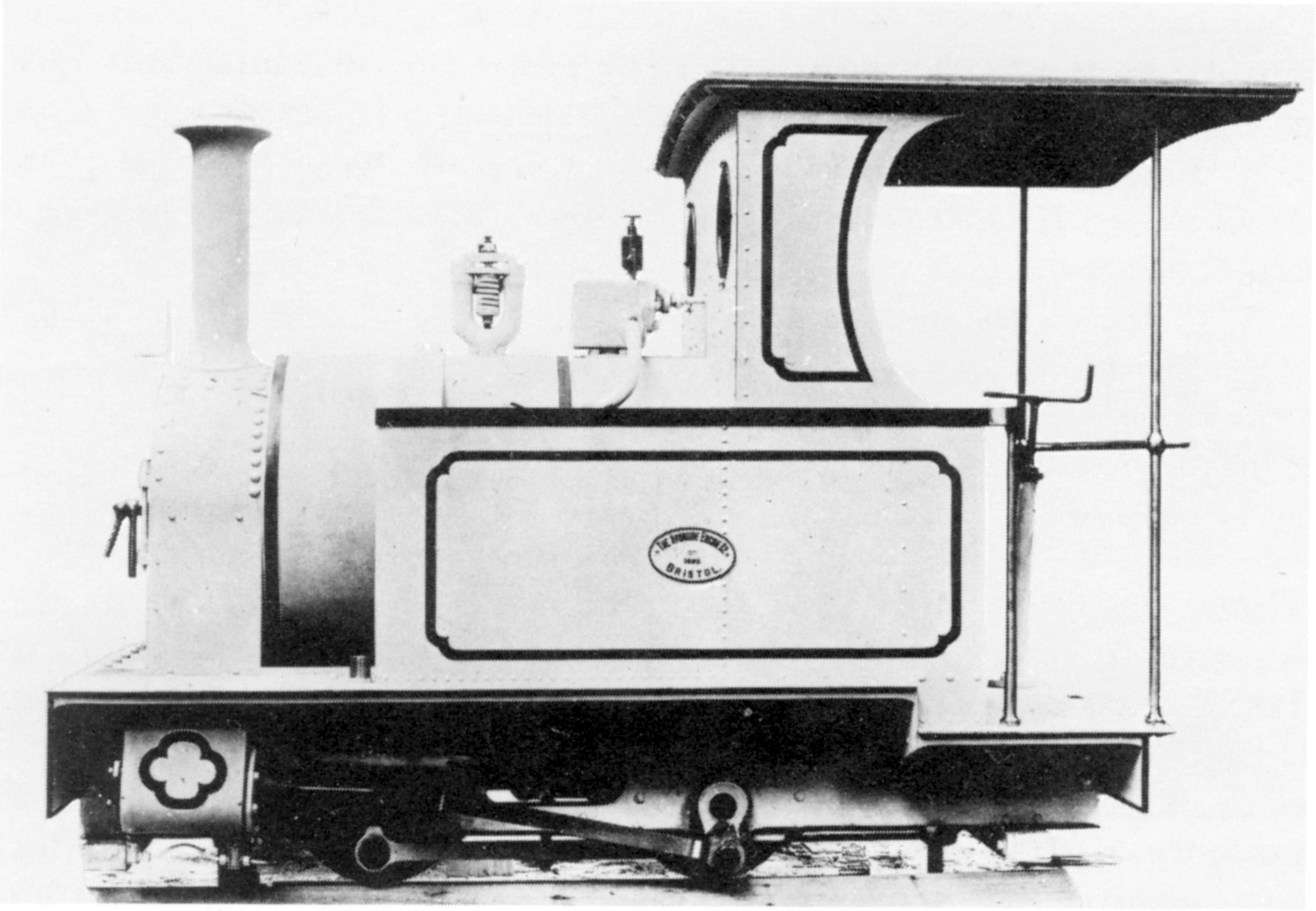
- South African NG 0-4-0T of 1899, ex Rand Mines
Type and origin
- Power type: Steam
- Designer: Avonside Engine Company
- Builder: Avonside Engine Company
- Model: Avonside "Imperial" Class
- Build date: 1899–1900
Specifications
- Configuration
  - Whyte: 0-4-0T
  - UIC: Bn2t
- Driver: 2nd coupled axle
- Gauge: Two 2 ft (610 mm); One 20 in (508 mm)
- Coupled dia.: 20 in (508 mm)
- Wheelbase: 3 ft 6 in (1,067 mm)
- Length
  - Over couplers: 12 ft 9 in (3,886 mm)
  - Over beams: 10 ft 6 in (3,200 mm)
- Height: 8 ft 4 in (2,540 mm)
- Frame type: Plate
- Fuel type: Coal
- Fuel capacity: 4 long hundredweight (203 kg)
- Water cap.: 110 imp gal (500 L)
- Firebox
  - Type: Round-top
  - Grate area: 5.5 sq ft (0.51 m^{2})
- Boiler
  - Pitch: 4 ft (1,219 mm)
- Boiler pressure: 120 psi (827 kPa)
- Safety valve: Ramsbottom
- Cylinders: Two
- Cylinder size: 7 in (178 mm) bore 10 in (254 mm) stroke
- Valve gear: Stephenson
- Couplers: Johnston link-and-pin
Performance figures
- Tractive effort: 2,572 lbf (11.44 kN) @ 75%
Career
- Operators: Rand Mines Limited; Reynolds Brothers Sugar Estates; South African Railways
- Number in class: 3
- Numbers: NG91, NG92, NG95
- Delivered: 1899–1900
- First run: 1899
- Withdrawn: 1918

The South African Railways NG 0-4-0T of 1899 was a narrow-gauge steam locomotive from the pre-Union era in Transvaal and Natal.

In 1899, Rand Mines acquired two narrow-gauge 0-4-0T steam locomotives from Avonside Engine Company and, in 1900, a similar locomotive was delivered to Reynolds Brothers Sugar Estates of Esperanza in Natal. In 1915, when an urgent need arose for additional narrow-gauge locomotives in German South West Africa during the First World War, these three locomotives were purchased second-hand by the South African Railways.

== Manufacturer ==
In 1899, Avonside Engine Company delivered two 24-inch gauge (610-millimetre) locomotives to Rand Mines on the Witwatersrand. In 1900, a third similar locomotive, but of 20 inches (508 millimetres) gauge, was delivered to Reynolds Brothers Sugar Estates in Natal. The latter was one of several of the same type which saw service on the Reynolds, Huletts and Chakaskraal sugar plantations in Natal.

== First World War ==
In 1915, while the military campaign was in progress against German forces in Deutsch-Südwest-Afrika (DSWA) during the First World War, an urgent need arose for additional locomotives for use on the narrow-gauge lines in that territory. The South African Railways (SAR) therefore purchased these three 0-4-0T locomotives second-hand on behalf of the Defence Department. The two engines from Rand Mines were numbered NG91 and NG92, while the engine from Reynolds Brothers was numbered NG95. Since a narrow-gauge locomotive classification system had not yet been implemented on the SAR, they were not classified.

== Service ==
Whether all three were placed in service by the SAR is not certain, since engine no. NG95 from Reynolds Brothers would not be usable without first being regauged to 24 inches (610 millimetres) gauge. It is also unclear whether any of them were actually placed in service in DSWA or whether they were used to replace other SAR narrow-gauge locomotives which had been commandeered by the Union Defence Forces for war service in DSWA.

The locomotives were withdrawn from SAR service and sold towards the end of the war in 1918.
