= CGR 1st Class 0-4-0ST 1875 =

Type of steam locomotive

CGR 1st Class 0-4-0ST 1875 South African Class 01 0-4-0ST 1875
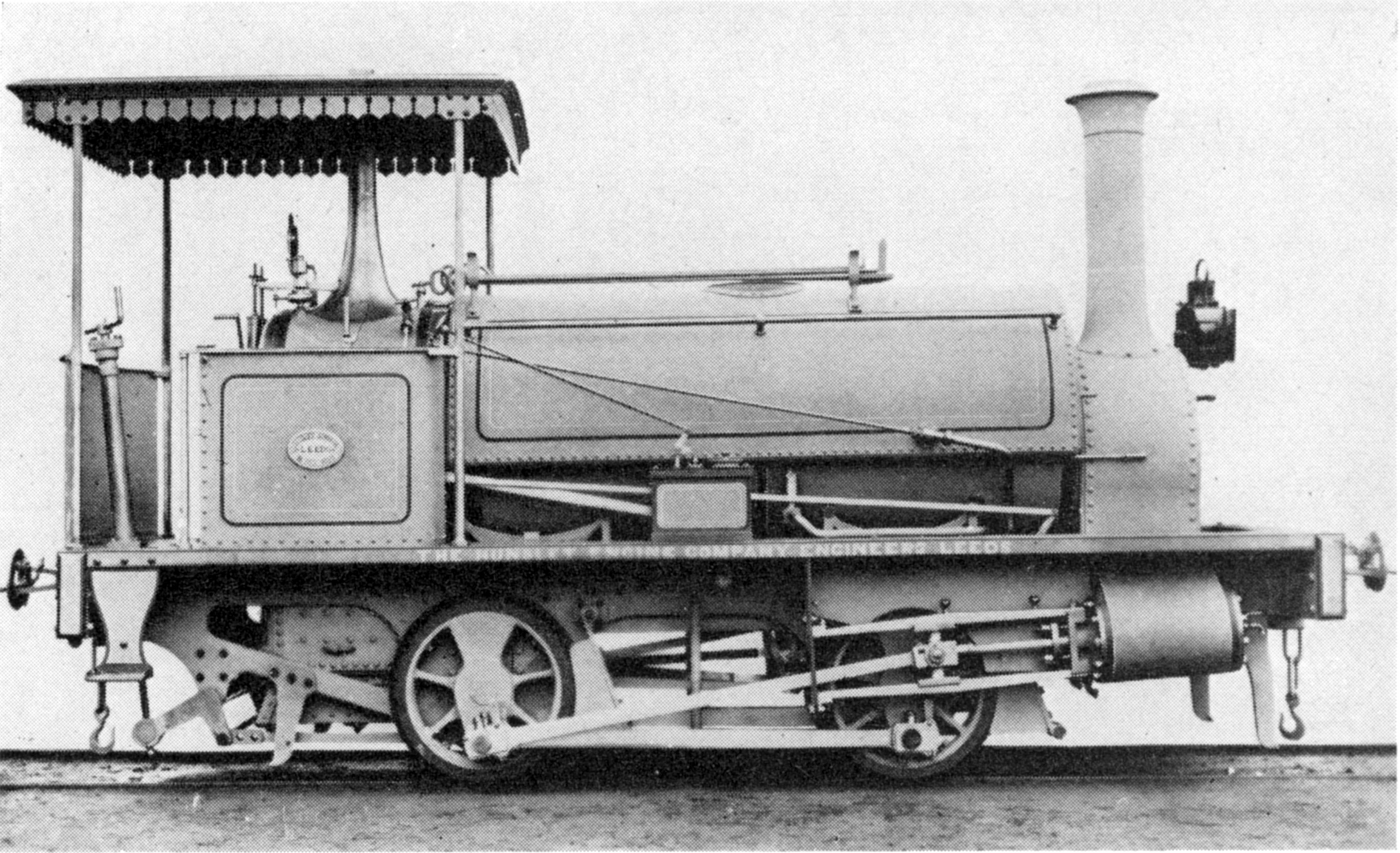
- CGR 1st Class 0-4-0ST of 1875
Type and origin
- Power type: Steam
- Designer: Hunslet Engine Company
- Builder: Hunslet Engine Company
- Serial number: 129, 135–136, 271–272, 280
- Build date: 1875–1882
- Total produced: 6
Specifications
- Configuration
  - Whyte: 0-4-0ST
  - UIC: Bn2t
- Driver: 2nd coupled axle
- Gauge: 3 ft 6 in (1,067 mm) Cape gauge
- Coupled dia.: 30 in (762 mm)
- Wheelbase: 6 ft (1,829 mm)
- Length
  - Over couplers: 20 ft 9 in (6,325 mm)
  - Over beams: 17 ft 9 in (5,410 mm)
- Height: 10 ft (3,048 mm)
- Adhesive weight: 13 LT 1 cwt (13,260 kg)
- Loco weight: 13 LT 1 cwt (13,260 kg)
- Fuel type: Coal
- Fuel capacity: 15 long hundredweight (0.76 t)
- Water cap.: 280 imp gal (1,270 L)
- Firebox
  - Type: Round-top
  - Grate area: 4 1/2 sq ft (0.42 m^{2})
- Boiler
  - Type: Domeless
  - Pitch: 4 ft 4 1/2 in (1,334 mm)
  - Diameter: 2 ft 5 1/2 in (749 mm) outside
  - Tube plates: 9 ft 6 in (2,896 mm)
- Boiler pressure: 130 psi (896 kPa)
- Heating surface
  - Firebox: 30 sq ft (2.8 m^{2})
  - Tubes: 270 sq ft (25 m^{2})
  - Total surface: 300 sq ft (28 m^{2})
- Cylinders: Two
- Cylinder size: 9 1/2 in (241 mm) bore 16 in (406 mm) stroke
- Valve gear: Stephenson
- Couplers: Johnston link-and-pin
Performance figures
- Tractive effort: 4,693 lbf (20.88 kN) @ 75%
Career
- Operators: Cape Government Railways; South African Railways
- Number in class: 6
- Numbers: M3-M4, E1, W43-W45
- Delivered: 1875–1882
- First run: 1875

The Cape Government Railways 1st Class 0-4-0ST of 1875 was a South African steam locomotive from the pre-Union era in the Cape of Good Hope.

In 1875 and 1882, six Cape gauge 0-4-0ST locomotives were placed in service on all three systems of the Cape Government Railways. They were designated 1st Class when a locomotive classification system was adopted.

== Manufacturer ==
The Hunslet Engine Company delivered six 0-4-0ST locomotives to the Cape Government Railways in 1875 and 1882, all built with domeless boilers.

The locomotive had 4 inches (102 millimetres) thick wooden buffer beams and used wooden brake blocks on all four wheels. The engine's brakes were hand-operated from the footplate. The feedwater pump was attached to the centre frame stretcher and was driven by an eccentric, mounted on the driving wheel axle.

== Domeless boiler ==
On this locomotive, the arrangement of the saddle-tank precluded the use of the usual steam dome on the boiler barrel. Instead, steam for the cylinders was collected by a perforated pipe, fitted to the combined regulator and steam collector box, which was arranged at the highest point in the steam space above the crown of the firebox.

The 1930s Chief Mechanical Engineer of the South African Railways, A.G. Watson, adopted a somewhat similar method for his largest Watson Standard boilers, which came so close to the upper limits of the loading gauge that there was insufficient space for a steam dome.

== Service ==
The first three locomotives arrived in 1875. Two went to the Midland System in Port Elizabeth and were numbered M3 and M4. The third engine, no. E1, was the first locomotive to enter Railways service on the Eastern system in East London.

Another three locomotives, of the same domeless type, were delivered to the Western System in Cape Town in 1882, numbered in the range from W43 to W45.

When a classification system for locomotives was introduced on the CGR, these locomotives were designated 1st Class.

=== Midland System ===
The two locomotives on the Midland System were, most likely, used in shunting or construction work or both. At the time they entered service in 1875, the two mainlines from Port Elizabeth were completed to Uitenhage and Barkly Bridge respectively. To work these lines, the first six 2nd Class 2-6-2 tank-and-tender mainline locomotives entered service on the Midland System in that same year.

=== Eastern System ===
Railway construction out of East London on the Eastern System only began in earnest in 1876. No. E1, the Eastern System's first locomotive, arrived in East London in October 1875 and was therefore in all probability employed as construction locomotive from the outset.

=== Western System ===
The three 0-4-0ST locomotives on the Western System were placed in service as shunting engines in Cape Town and also worked in Table Bay Harbour. At the time of their arrival in Cape Town in 1882, the mainline was already in operation to Beaufort West.

== Renumbering ==
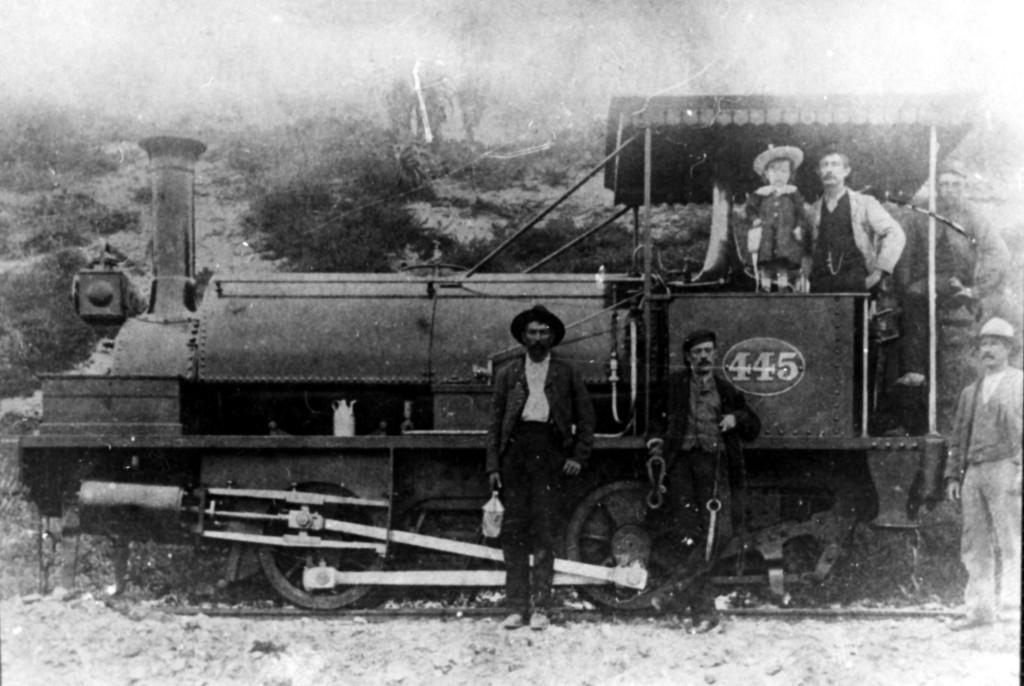
CGR 1st Class 0-4-0ST no. 445, c. 1885 (Possibly ex CGR no. W45, later no. 525)

These locomotives were all renumbered from time to time. By 1886, the system prefixes had been dropped. Photographic evidence, such as the picture alongside, suggest that there was also an intermediate CGR numbering system, applied across all three systems, at some stage between 1884 and the renumberings of the late 1880s. Apart from the occasional photograph, however, no documentary evidence of this number range has yet been found. The fact that no new locomotives were acquired by the CGR between 1884 and 1888, may possibly account for the lack of documented evidence about this number range.

In 1903, one of the Western System's locomotives, no. 43, was sold to the De Beers diamond mines in Kimberley.

== South African Railways ==
The Union of South Africa was established on 31 May 1910 and the three Colonial government railways, the CGR, the Natal Government Railways and the Central South African Railways, were united under one single administration to control and administer the railways, ports and harbours of the Union. Even though the South African Railways and Harbours came into existence in 1910, the actual classification and renumbering of all the rolling stock of the three constituent railways required careful planning and was only implemented with effect from 1 January 1912.

By 1912, three of the remaining locomotives had been scrapped. The remaining two came onto the SAR roster, but were considered obsolete. They were therefore designated Class 01 and renumbered by having the numeral 0 prefixed to their existing numbers. By the early 1940s, these two were still in service, one at the Table Bay Harbour expansion works and the other on the testing of steam-heating equipment on passenger coaches in the station yard at East London.

== Works numbers ==
The works numbers, years in service, system, original numbers and known renumbering of the 1st Class 0-4-0ST locomotives of 1875 are listed in the table.

CGR 1st Class 0-4-0ST of 1875
Works no.	Year	System	Loco no.	1886 no.	1888 no.	1890 no.	1904 no.	SAR no.	Notes
129	1875	Midland	M3	103	103	203	533		
135	1875	Midland	M4	104	104	204	534	0534	
136	1875	Eastern	E1	?	601				
271	1882	Western	W43	43	43	43			De Beers
272	1882	Western	W44	44	49	49	523		
280	1882	Western	W45	45	50	50	525	0525	
