= CGR 0-4-0ST 1881 Coffee Pot =

South African steam locomotive

Teague and Company 0-4-0ST CGR 0-4-0ST 1881 Coffee Pot
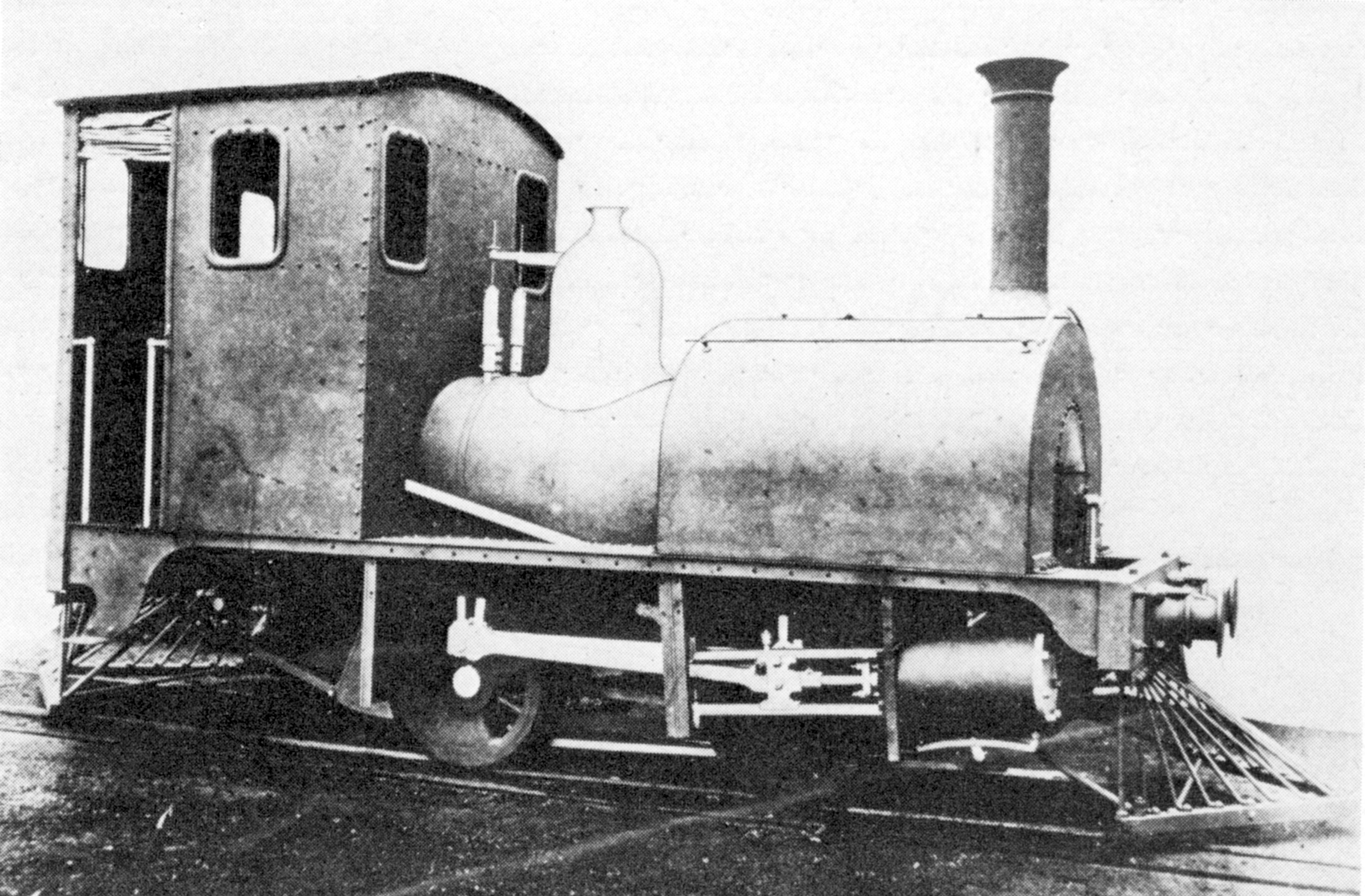
- Kimberley Diamond Mine's ex Teague and Company no. 4 with buffers-and-chain coupling, sister locomotive to the CGR 0-4-0ST locomotive Coffee Pot
Type and origin
- Power type: Steam
- Designer: Ruston, Proctor & Co.
- Builder: Ruston, Proctor & Co.
- Serial number: 7272-7273
- Build date: 1881
- Total produced: 2
Specifications
- Configuration
  - Whyte: 0-4-0ST (Four-coupled)
  - UIC: Bn2t
- Driver: 2nd coupled axle
- Gauge: 3 ft 6 in (1,067 mm) Cape gauge
- Coupled dia.: 33 in (838 mm)
- Wheelbase: 5 ft (1,524 mm)
- Length
  - Over couplers: 19 ft (5,791 mm)
- Height: 9 ft (2,743 mm)
- Fuel type: Coal
- Firebox
  - Type: Round-top
  - Grate area: 5.7 sq ft (0.53 m^{2})
- Boiler
  - Pitch: 4 ft 2 3/4 in (1,289 mm)
  - Diameter: 2 ft 9 1/4 in (845 mm)
  - Tube plates: 7 ft 3 in (2,210 mm)
- Boiler pressure: 120 psi (827 kPa)
- Safety valve: Salter
- Cylinders: Two
- Cylinder size: 9 1/2 in (241 mm) bore 16 in (406 mm) stroke
- Valve gear: Stephenson
- Couplers: Buffers-and-chain (Teague's); Johnston link-and-pin (CGR)
Performance figures
- Tractive effort: 3,895 lbf (17.33 kN) @ 75%
Career
- Operators: Teague and Company; Kimberley Mining Board; Cape Government Railways; Kimberley Diamond Mine
- Number in class: 1
- Nicknames: Coffee Pot
- Delivered: 1881 Teague and Company; 1885 Cape Government Railways
- First run: 1881

The Cape Government Railways 0-4-0ST 1881 Coffee Pot was a South African steam locomotive from the pre-Union era in the Cape of Good Hope.

In 1881, two Cape gauge saddle-tank locomotives with a 0-4-0 wheel arrangement were placed in service by Teague and Company, who operated Teague's Tramway at the Kimberley diamond mine. In March 1885, one of them was purchased by the Cape Government Railways for use as a construction locomotive, while the other was sold to the Kimberley Diamond Mine. The Railways locomotive was nicknamed the Coffee Pot while serving as construction engine at Norvalspont.

== Cape railways expansion ==
In 1876, the Cape Government Railways (CGR) was reorganised into three semi-autonomous systems, the Western System headquartered in Cape Town, the Midland System headquartered in Port Elizabeth and the Eastern System headquartered in East London.

Construction of the two Midland System mainlines of the CGR commenced in 1874, one line from Swartkops in Port Elizabeth and the other from Uitenhage towards Graaff Reinet. The Swartkops line reached Alicedale in 1877, Cookhouse in 1880 and Cradock in 1881. At Rosmead, the Midland System linked up with the Eastern System out of East London in 1883, and Noupoort was reached in that same year. From Noupoort, two lines were constructed. One headed northwestward and linked up with the Western System out of Cape Town at De Aar on 31 March 1884. The other headed northward via Colesberg towards the Orange Free State and, also in 1884, reached the Orange River at Norvalspont. Here a bridge had to be constructed across the Orange for the line from Colesberg to be continued to Springfontein in the Orange Free State.

== Teague's Tramway ==
In May 1881, Teague and Company began operating on a short 3 ft 6 in (1,067 mm) Cape gauge line, known as Teague's Tramway, at the Kimberley diamond mine. This isolated line, the first railway in Kimberley, was about one mile long and was used for waste removal, serving many of the companies operating at the mine.

The tramway acquired four locomotives, of which numbers 3 and 4 were 0-4-0 saddle-tank engines, built in 1881 by Ruston, Proctor and Company with works numbers 7272 and 7273. They were supplied through agents Sinclaire, Hamilton and Company in 1881, along with 150 four-wheel tip wagons built by Brown, Marshall and Company.

The line was not economic and, when Teague and Company withdrew in October 1881, it was taken over by the Kimberley Mining Board, which itself went bankrupt in March 1883. The tramway ceased to operate after July 1883 and its equipment was offered for sale in March 1885. Of the four tramway locomotives, engine no. 3 was purchased by the CGR and no. 4 by the Kimberley Diamond Mine.

== Cape Government Railways ==
Engine no. 3 had its spring buffers-and-chain couplers replaced with the CGR's standard Johnston link-and-pin couplers. The locomotive was probably never classified or renumbered in CGR service and became generally known as the Coffee Pot. It served as construction locomotive while a temporary rail bridge was being constructed across the Orange River at Norvalspont, later to be replaced by a permanent bridge. In 1889, the Coffee Pot became the first locomotive to steam across the border between the Cape of Good Hope and the Orange Free State.
