= 1896 in South Africa =

- Decades: 1870s; 1880s; 1890s; 1900s; 1910s
- See also: 1896 in South African sport; List of years in South Africa

The following lists events that happened during 1896 in South Africa.

== Incumbents ==
- Governor of the Cape of Good Hope and High Commissioner for Southern Africa:Hercules Robinson.
- Governor of the Colony of Natal: Charles Bullen Hugh Mitchell.
- State President of the Orange Free State: Pieter Jeremias Blignaut (until 4 March), Martinus Theunis Steyn (starting 4 March).
- State President of the South African Republic: Paul Kruger.
- Prime Minister of the Cape of Good Hope: Cecil John Rhodes (until 13 January), John Gordon Sprigg (starting 13 January).
- Prime Minister of the Colony of Natal: .

== Events ==
January

- 2 – Leander Starr Jameson and his forces surrender at Doornkop near Krugersdorp.
- 6 – Cecil Rhodes is forced to resign as Prime Minister of the Cape Colony for his involvement in the Jameson Raid.

February

- 19 – A train carrying 56 tons of dynamite explodes at Braamfontein, Johannesburg, killing more than 78 people.

May

- 13 – The Franchise Bill is passed by Natal's Legislative Assembly, disfranchising natives of other countries.

June

- 5 – Mohandas Karamchand Gandhi embarks from Durban for Calcutta en route to Bombay.

August

- 6 – Cape Town's first electric tram service begins operation along Adderley Street to Mowbray Hill.

December

- 18 – Mohandas Karamchand Gandhi arrives back in Durban with his wife and two sons, but the ship is placed under a 5-day quarantine because Bombay was declared a plague-infected port. Quarantine will later be extended to 13 January 1897.

Unknown date

- South Africa's first school of mines is opened in Kimberley. It will later form the core of the University of the Witwatersrand in Johannesburg.

== Births ==
- 1 February – Stephanus Le Roux Marais, organist, teacher and composer of Afrikaans songs, is born in the district of Bloemfontein.
- 1 February – Ivan Mitford-Barberton, art teacher at the Michaelis School of Art in Cape Town and sculptor of several monuments in South Africa, is born in Somerset East.
- April – Clements Kadalie, trade unionist, is born at Chifira, Nkhata Bay District, Nyasaland (now Malawi).
- 3 May – Petrus Johannes Lemmer, composer of Afrikaans songs, is born in Hartbeesfontein, Transvaal.
- 27 October – Edith Haisman, RMS Titanic survivor, is born in Worcester, Cape Colony (d. 1997)

== Deaths ==
- 17 September – Nicholaas Waterboer, Griqua chief and eldest son of Andries Waterboer, dies in Griekwastad.

== Railways ==
=== Railway lines opened ===
- 1 February – Cape Eastern – Sterkstroom to Indwe, 67 miles (107.8 kilometres).
- 1 April – Transvaal – Kaapmuiden to Barberton, 34 miles (54.7 kilometres).
- 2 November – Transvaal – Krugersdorp to Frederikstad, 52 miles (83.7 kilometres).

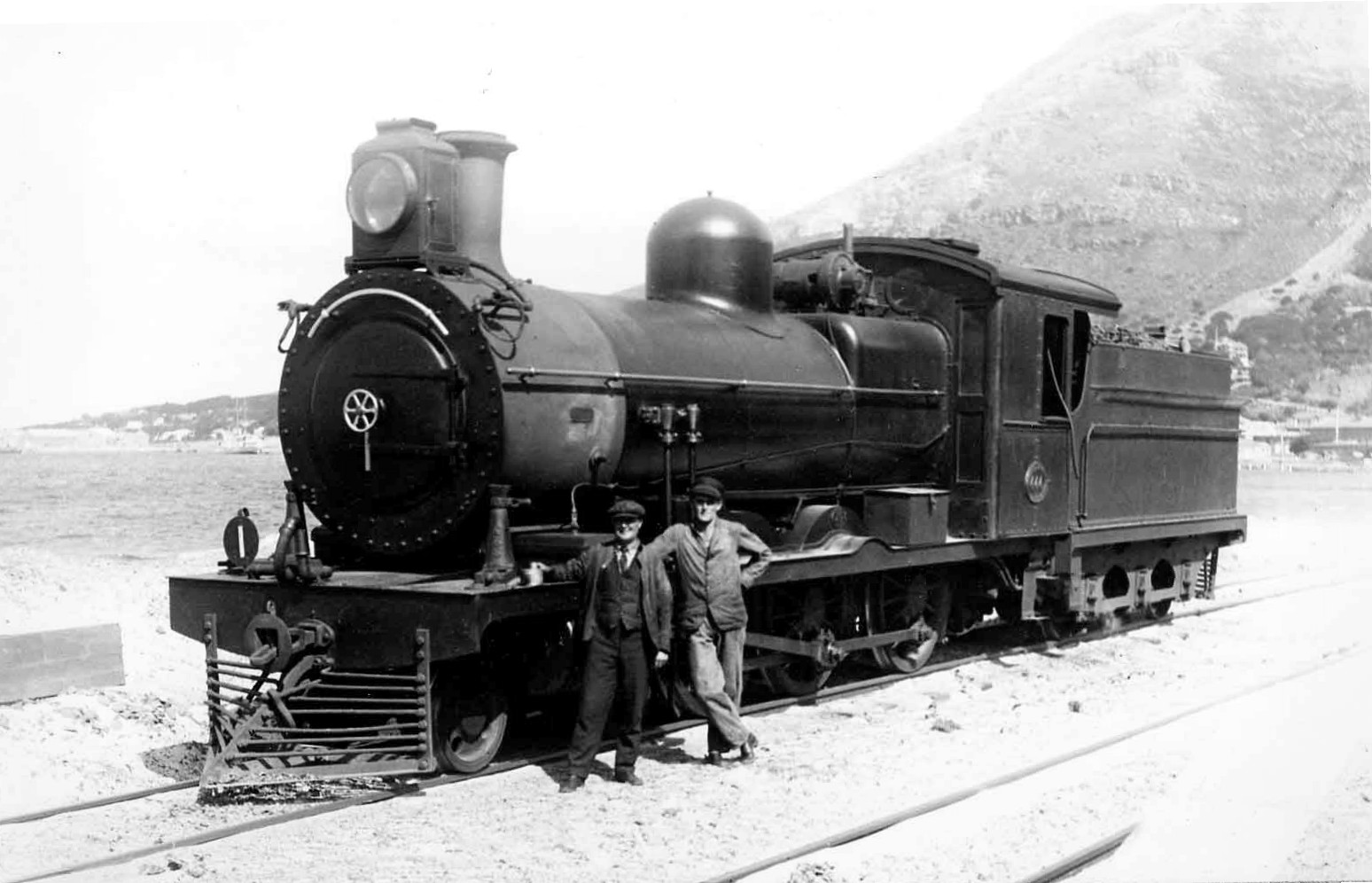
SAR Class 6A

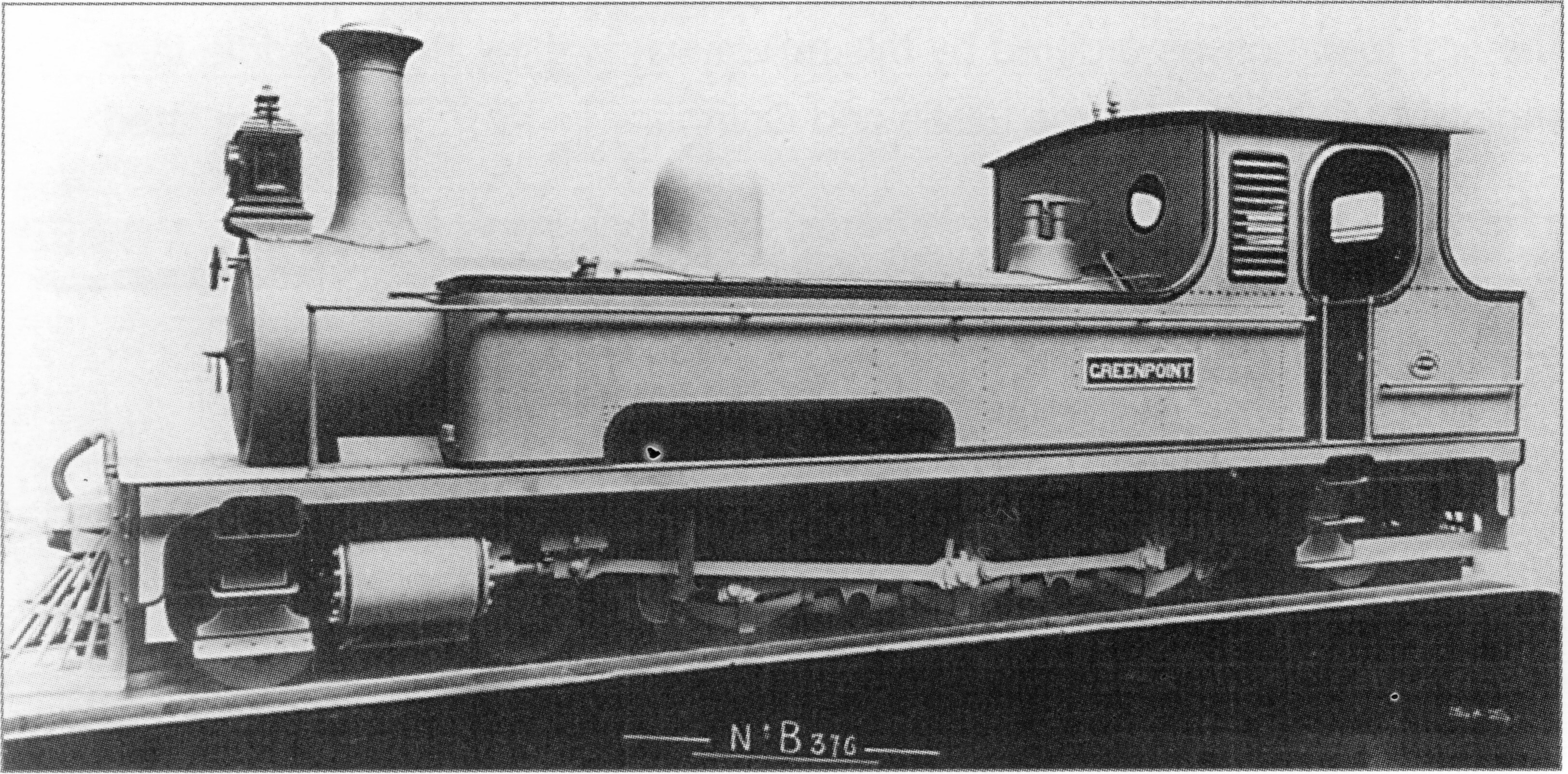
Metropolitan & Suburban Pacific

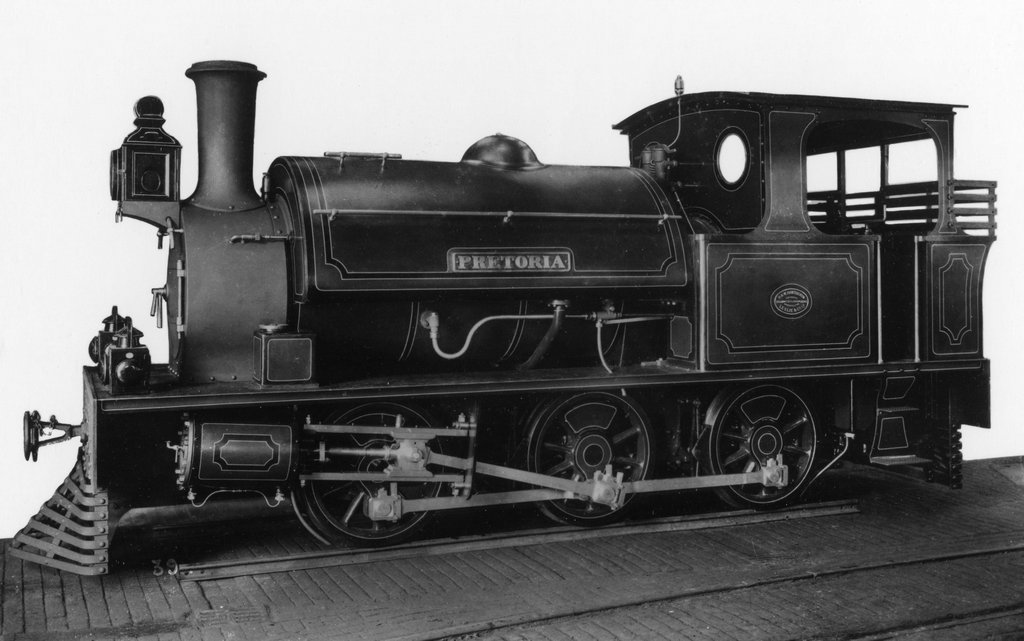
PPR 26 Tonner

=== Locomotives ===
Cape

- Two new Cape gauge locomotive types enter service on the Cape Government Railways (CGR):
  - The first of a second batch of fifty 6th Class 4-6-0 steam locomotives. In 1912 they would be designated Class 6A on the South African Railways (SAR).
  - The first of a second batch of forty-six 7th Class 4-8-0 Mastodon type locomotives on the Midland and Eastern Systems. In 1912 they would be designated Class 7A on the SAR.
- Two 4-6-2 Pacific type tank locomotives enter service on the Metropolitan and Suburban Railway that operates a suburban passenger service between Cape Town and Sea Point.

Free State

- The Oranje-Vrijstaat Gouwerment-Spoorwegen places the first of twenty-four new Cape 6th Class 4-6-0 steam locomotives in service. In 1912 they would be designated Class 6C on the SAR.

Natal

- The Natal Government Railways (NGR) rebuilds one of its Class G 4-6-0 tank locomotives to the first 4-6-4 Baltic type locomotive in the world. It was later designated the NGR Class H.

Transvaal

- The independent Pretoria-Pietersburg Railway in the Zuid-Afrikaansche Republiek (Transvaal Republic) places the first of three 26 Tonner saddle-tank locomotives in service.
