= 1892 in South Africa =

- Decades: 1870s; 1880s; 1890s; 1900s; 1910s
- See also: List of years in South Africa

The following lists events that happened during 1892 in South Africa.

== Incumbents ==
- Governor of the Cape of Good Hope and High Commissioner for Southern Africa:Henry Brougham Loch.
- Governor of the Colony of Natal: Charles Bullen Hugh Mitchell.
- State President of the Orange Free State: Francis William Reitz.
- State President of the South African Republic: Paul Kruger.
- Prime Minister of the Cape of Good Hope: Cecil John Rhodes.

== Events ==
February

- 8 – The Orange Free State, Transvaal and the Cape Colony officially adopt a uniform standard time of GMT+01:30.

August

- 20 – The Johannesburg Reform Committee is established by prominent Johannesburg citizens.

September

- 8 – The South African and International Exhibition opens
- 15 – The railway line from Cape Town via Bloemfontein, with connections to Port Elizabeth and East London, is completed to Germiston.

== Births ==
- 3 January – J.R.R. Tolkien, writer, poet, philologist and professor. (d. 1973)

== Railways ==
=== Railway lines opened ===
- 8 February – Cape Midland – Rosmead Junction to Stormberg Junction to link with the Cape Eastern, 83 miles (133.6 kilometres).
- 7 May – Free State – Bloemfontein to Vaal River Bridge, 212 miles 79 chains (342.8 kilometres).
- 21 May – Cape Eastern – Albert Junction (Dreunberg Junction) to Bethulie Bridge, 39 miles (62.8 kilometres).

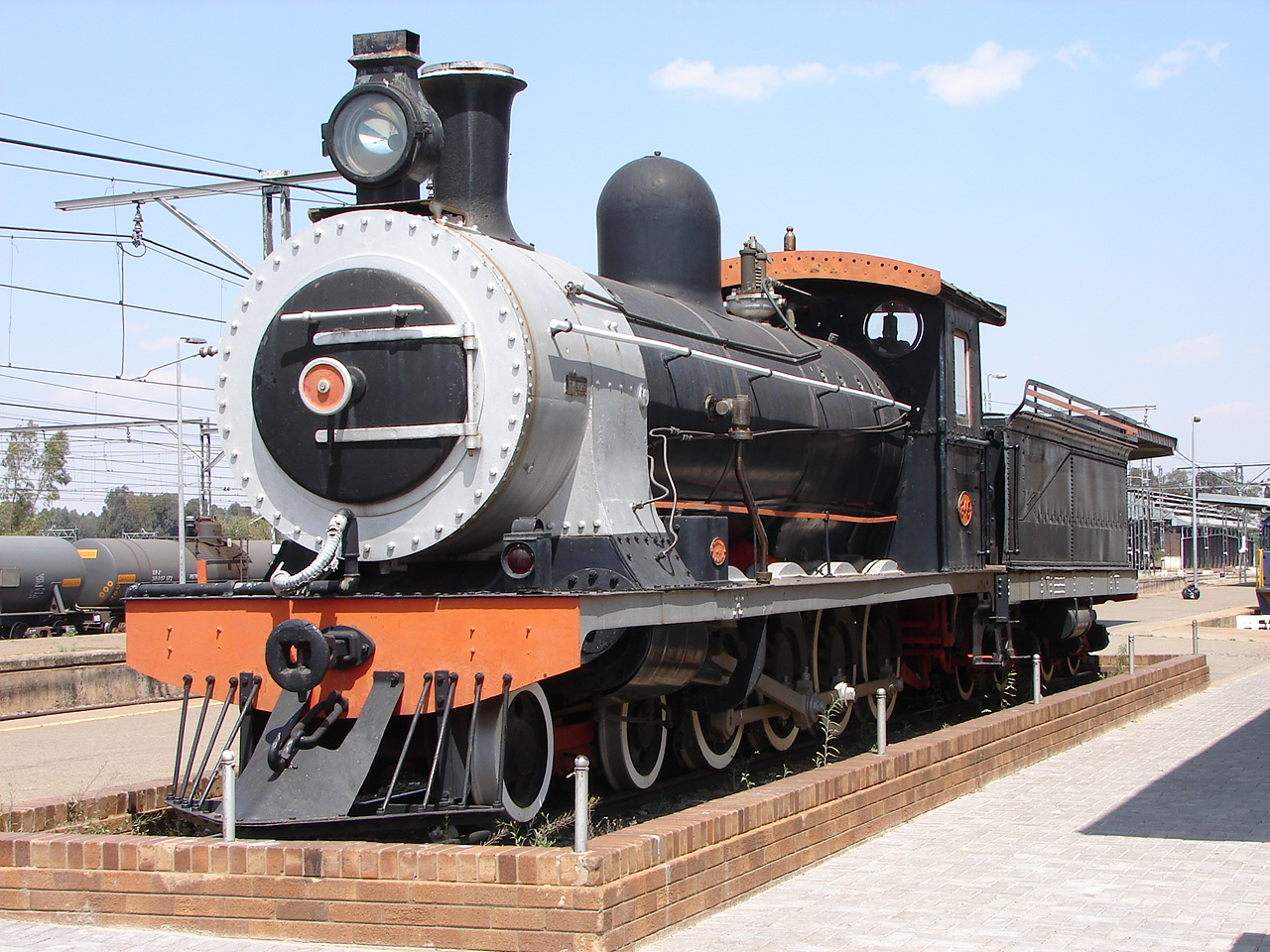
CGR 7th Class

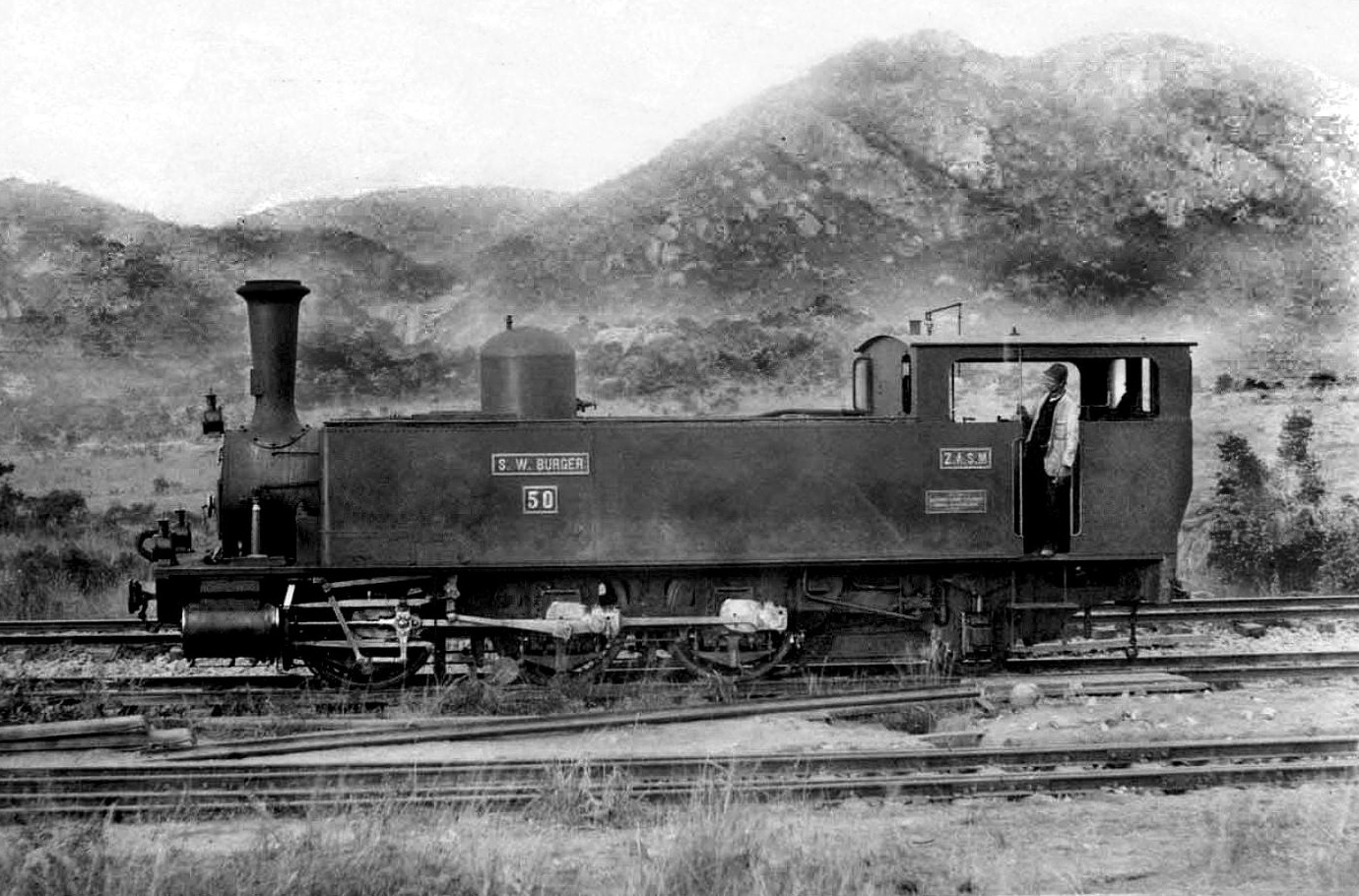
NZASM 40 Tonner

- 21 May – Free State – Bethulie Bridge to Springfontein, 28 miles 2 chains (45.1 kilometres).
- 20 June – Transvaal – Malelane to Nelspruit, 38 miles (61.2 kilometres).
- 12 July – Natal – Danskraal to Natal-Free State border, 35 miles 79 chains (57.9 kilometres).
- 12 July – Free State – Natal-Free State border to Harrismith, 23 miles 12 chains (37.3 kilometres).
- 15 September – Transvaal – Vaal River Bridge to Germiston, 40 miles (64.4 kilometres).

=== Locomotives ===
Cape

- The Cape Government Railways places the first six 7th Class 4-8-0 Mastodon type steam locomotives in service.

Transvaal

- The Nederlandsche-Zuid-Afrikaansche Spoorweg-Maatschappij of the Zuid-Afrikaansche Republiek (Transvaal Republic) places the first of twenty 40 Tonner tank locomotives in service.
