= 1893 in South Africa =

- Decades: 1870s; 1880s; 1890s; 1900s; 1910s
- See also: List of years in South Africa

The following lists events that happened during 1893 in South Africa.

== Incumbents ==
- Governor of the Cape of Good Hope and High Commissioner for Southern Africa:Henry Brougham Loch.
- Governor of the Colony of Natal:
  - until July: Charles Bullen Hugh Mitchell.
  - July–September : Francis Seymour Haden
  - starting 27 September: Walter Hely-Hutchinson.
- State President of the Orange Free State: Francis William Reitz.
- State President of the South African Republic: Paul Kruger.
- Prime Minister of the Cape of Good Hope: Cecil John Rhodes.
- Prime Minister of the Colony of Natal: Sir John Robinson

== Events ==
January

- 10 – The South African and International Exhibition closes

May

- 23 – Mahatma Gandhi arrives in Durban.

Unknown date

- The first Crocidolite (Blue Asbestos) mine is opened near Prieska.

== Births ==
- 16 May – Clement Martyn Doke, South African linguist. (d. 1980)

== Deaths ==
- 30 April – Johannes Willem Viljoen, big-game hunter and politician, dies on his farm near Zeerust at the age of 81.
- 23 June – Sir Theophilus Shepstone, South African statesman. (b. 1817)
- 9 July – George Christopher Cato, the first mayor of Durban, dies at the age of 79.

== Railways ==
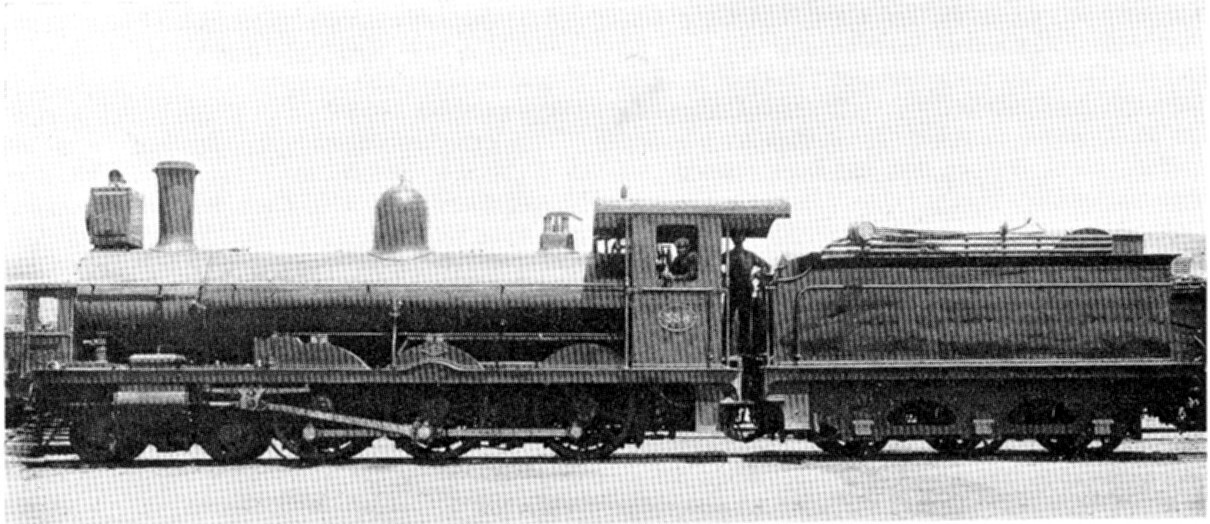
CGR 6th Class of 1893

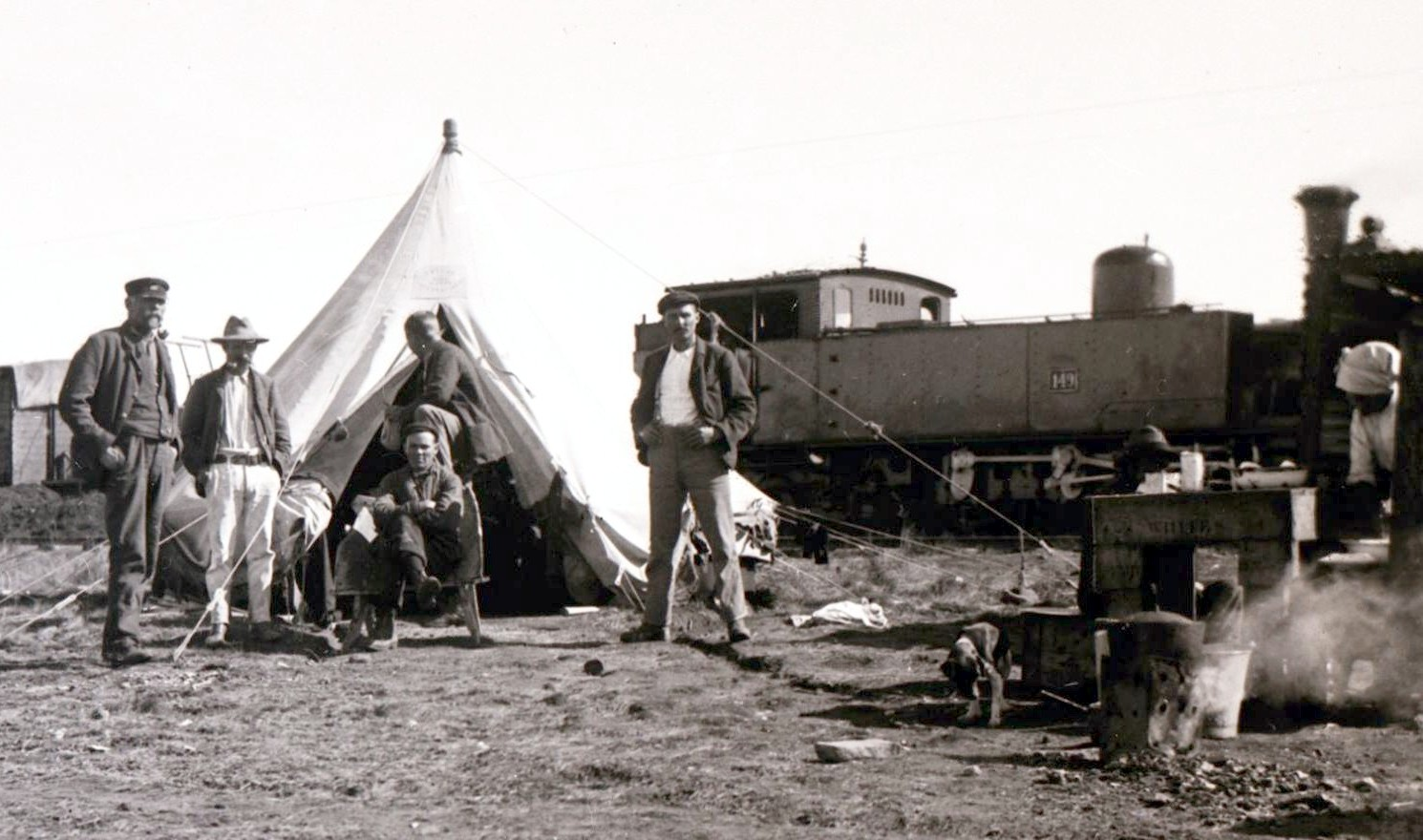
NZASM 46 Tonner, c. 1895

=== Railway lines opened ===
- 1 January – Transvaal – Germiston to Pretoria, 35 miles (56.3 kilometres).
- 30 December – Transvaal – Nelspruit to Airlie, 42 miles (67.6 kilometres).

=== Locomotives ===
Cape

- The Cape Government Railways places the first of forty 6th Class 4-6-0 passenger steam locomotives in service on its Western and Midland Systems. They will become the Class 6 on the South African Railways in 1912.

Transvaal

- The first of an eventual 175 46 Tonner 0-6-4 tank steam locomotives are placed in service by the Nederlandsche-Zuid-Afrikaansche Spoorweg-Maatschappij in the Zuid-Afrikaansche Republiek. The survivors will become the Class B on the South African Railways in 1912.
