= NGR 2-6-0T Durban & Pietermaritzburg =

Type of steam locomotive

Wythes & Jackson 2-6-0T NGR 2-6-0T Durban & Pietermaritzburg Selati Railway 2-6-0T
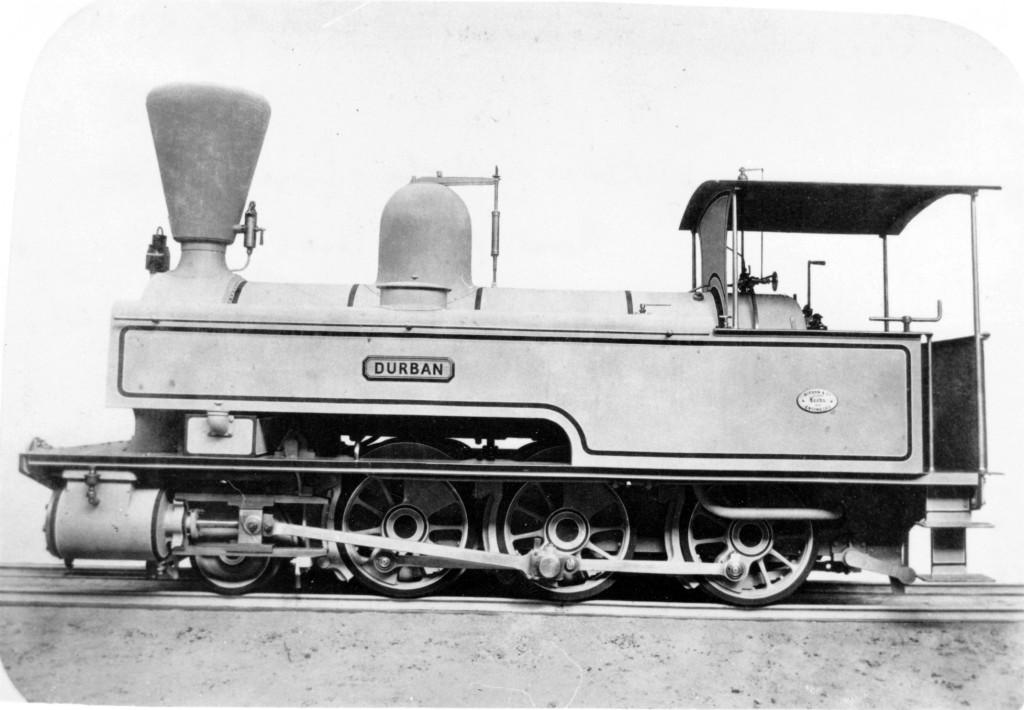
- Works picture of Wythes & Jackson's Durban, c. 1876
Type and origin
- Power type: Steam
- Designer: Kitson and Company
- Builder: Kitson and Company
- Serial number: 2097 (Durban); 2098 (Pietermaritzburg)
- Build date: 1876
- Total produced: 2
Specifications
- Configuration
  - Whyte: 2-6-0T (Mogul)
  - UIC: 1Cn2t
- Driver: 2nd coupled axle
- Gauge: 3 ft 6 in (1,067 mm) Cape gauge
- Leading dia.: 30 in (762 mm)
- Coupled dia.: 39 in (991 mm)
- Wheelbase: 12 ft 1 in (3,683 mm)
  - Axle spacing (Asymmetrical): 1-2: 3 ft 7 1/2 in (1,105 mm); 2-3: 4 ft 1 1/2 in (1,257 mm)
  - Coupled: 7 ft 9 in (2,362 mm)
- Length
  - Over couplers: 23 ft 1 in (7,036 mm)
- Height: 12 ft (3,658 mm)
- Frame type: Plate
- Axle load: 6 LT 12 cwt (6,706 kg)
  - Leading: 6 LT 4 cwt (6,299 kg)
  - 1st coupled: 6 LT 10 cwt (6,604 kg)
  - 2nd coupled: 6 LT 12 cwt (6,706 kg)
  - 3rd coupled: 6 LT 2 cwt (6,198 kg)
- Adhesive weight: 19 LT 4 cwt (19,510 kg)
- Loco weight: 25 LT 8 cwt (25,810 kg)
- Fuel type: Wood
- Fuel capacity: 1 LT (1.0 t) (Coal)
- Water cap.: 600 imp gal (2,730 L)
- Firebox
  - Type: Round-top
  - Grate area: 9.79 sq ft (0.910 m^{2})
- Boiler
  - Pitch: 5 ft 3 1/8 in (1,603 mm)
  - Diameter: 3 ft 3 in (991 mm)
  - Tube plates: 9 ft 6 in (2,896 mm)
  - Small tubes: 116: 1 3/4 in (44 mm)
- Boiler pressure: 130 psi (896 kPa)
- Safety valve: Salter
- Heating surface
  - Firebox: 49.5 sq ft (4.60 m^{2})
  - Tubes: 590 sq ft (55 m^{2})
  - Total surface: 639.5 sq ft (59.41 m^{2})
- Cylinders: Two
- Cylinder size: 14 in (356 mm) bore 20 in (508 mm) stroke
- Valve gear: Stephenson
- Couplers: Johnston link-and-pin
Performance figures
- Tractive effort: 9,800 lbf (44 kN) @ 75%
Career
- Operators: Wythes & Jackson; Natal Government Railways; Selati Railway
- Number in class: 2
- Numbers: NGR 27-28
- Official name: Durban & Pietermaritzburg
- Delivered: 1877
- First run: 1877

The Natal Government Railways 2-6-0T Durban and Pietermaritzburg of 1877 were two South African steam locomotives from the pre-Union era in the Colony of Natal.

In 1875, the Natal Government Railways was established and, in 1877, all the assets of the Natal Railway Company were taken over by the colonial government in Natal. The government decided to adopt the 3 feet 6 inches Cape gauge in conformance with the railways in the Cape of Good Hope and to extend the existing short broad gauge line in Durban inland to Pietermaritzburg, up the north coast to Verulam and down the south coast to Isipingo. The contractors who were tasked with the construction of the line to Pietermaritzburg acquired two 2-6-0 tank locomotives early in 1877, for use during construction. They named them Durban and Pietermaritzburg. These were the first Cape gauge locomotives to enter service in Natal.

== Manufacturer ==
In 1876, Whythes & Jackson Limited, who was contracted by the Natal government for the construction of the railway from Durban to Pietermaritzburg, placed an order with Kitson and Company for two 2-6-0T tank locomotives for use during construction. The locomotives were not numbered, but were appropriately named Durban and Pietermaritzburg after the two towns which were to be connected by the new railway. They underwent their trial steaming at the builders on 31 August 1876 and were landed at the Point in Durban in early 1877, the Pietermaritzburg on 1 February off the ship Basotho and the Durban on 22 March.

== Characteristics ==
The locomotives, the first Cape gauge engines to enter service in Natal, were designed for wood-burning and were therefore equipped with American style balloon smokestacks which incorporated spark arresters. They used Salter safety valves and had axle-driven boiler feed-water pumps, placed between the frames.

== Service ==
=== Whythes & Jackson ===
The 73 miles (117 kilometres) route for the Pietermaritzburg line had already been surveyed in 1873. The contract stipulated that the line had to be Cape gauge, the rails used had to be of a 40 pounds per yard (20 kilograms per metre) mass, the minimum curve allowed would be of 300 feet (91 metres) radius and the steepest gradient was not to exceed 1 in 30 (3⅓%).

On 1 January 1876, the first sod was turned in Durban by the Lieutenant-Governor, Sir Henry Bulwer. Even though the pace of construction was slowed considerably due to the large number of bridges and viaducts necessitated by the terrain, the 17 miles (27 kilometres) section to Pinetown was completed on 4 September 1878 and opened to traffic.

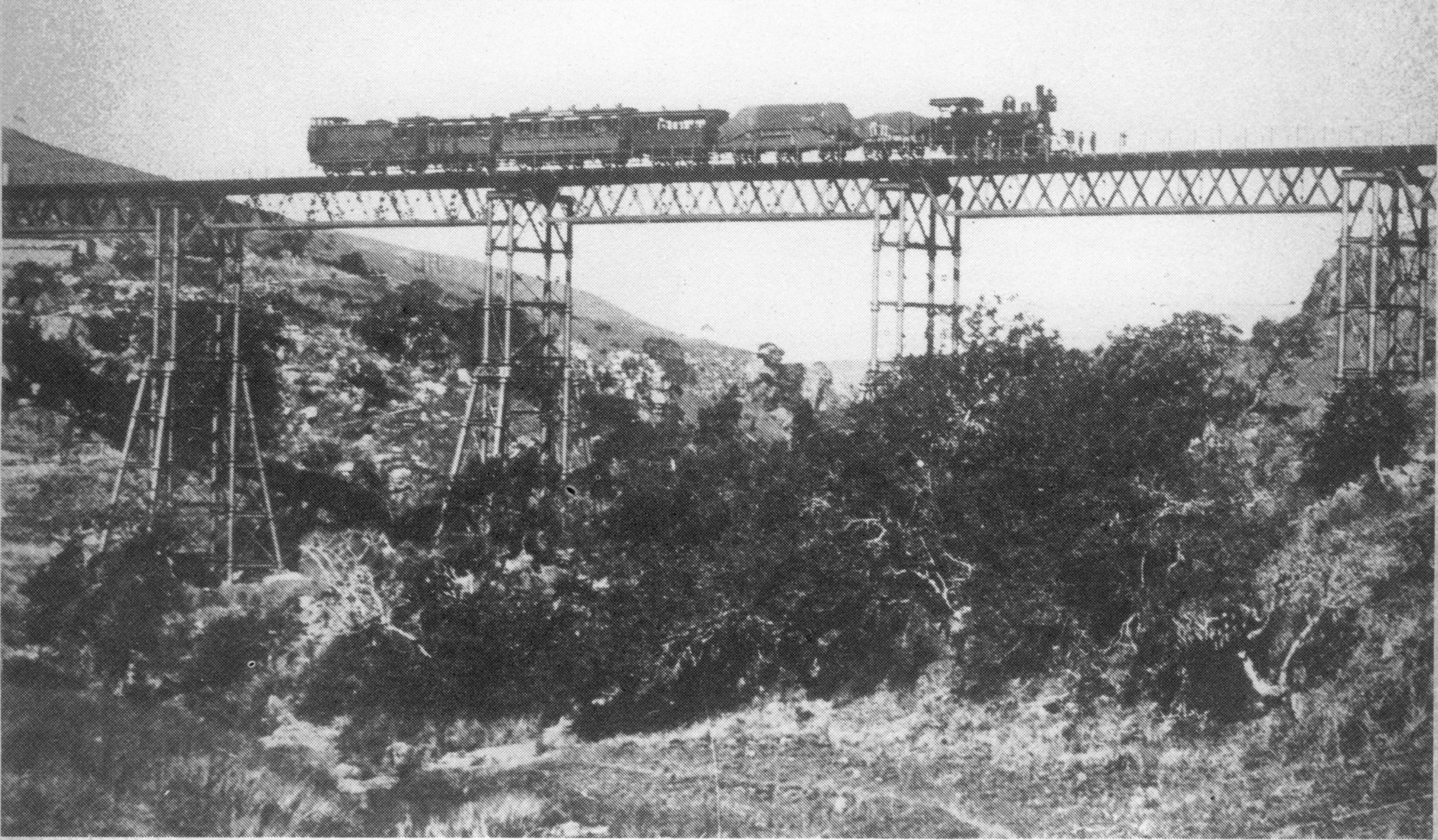
Inchanga viaduct, c. 1886

A spectacular viaduct, 89 feet (27 metres) high and one of altogether seven, had to be built across the valley at Inchanga, 40 miles (64 kilometres) from Durban. It was completed in July 1880, with piers made of tubular steel sections which supported a lattice decking girder on which the track was laid. The viaduct was prone to swaying in windy conditions and, as a safety precaution, train speed across the bridge was restricted to about 7 miles per hour (11 kilometres per hour). Trains were not allowed to run across it "during times of more than average wind" and, when the wind speed exceeded 10 miles per hour (16 kilometres per hour), passengers had to disembark and walk across the bridge, after which the train would follow. Between June 1885 and July 1886, additional slanted supporting struts were attached to the bridge piers to give the structure greater stability.

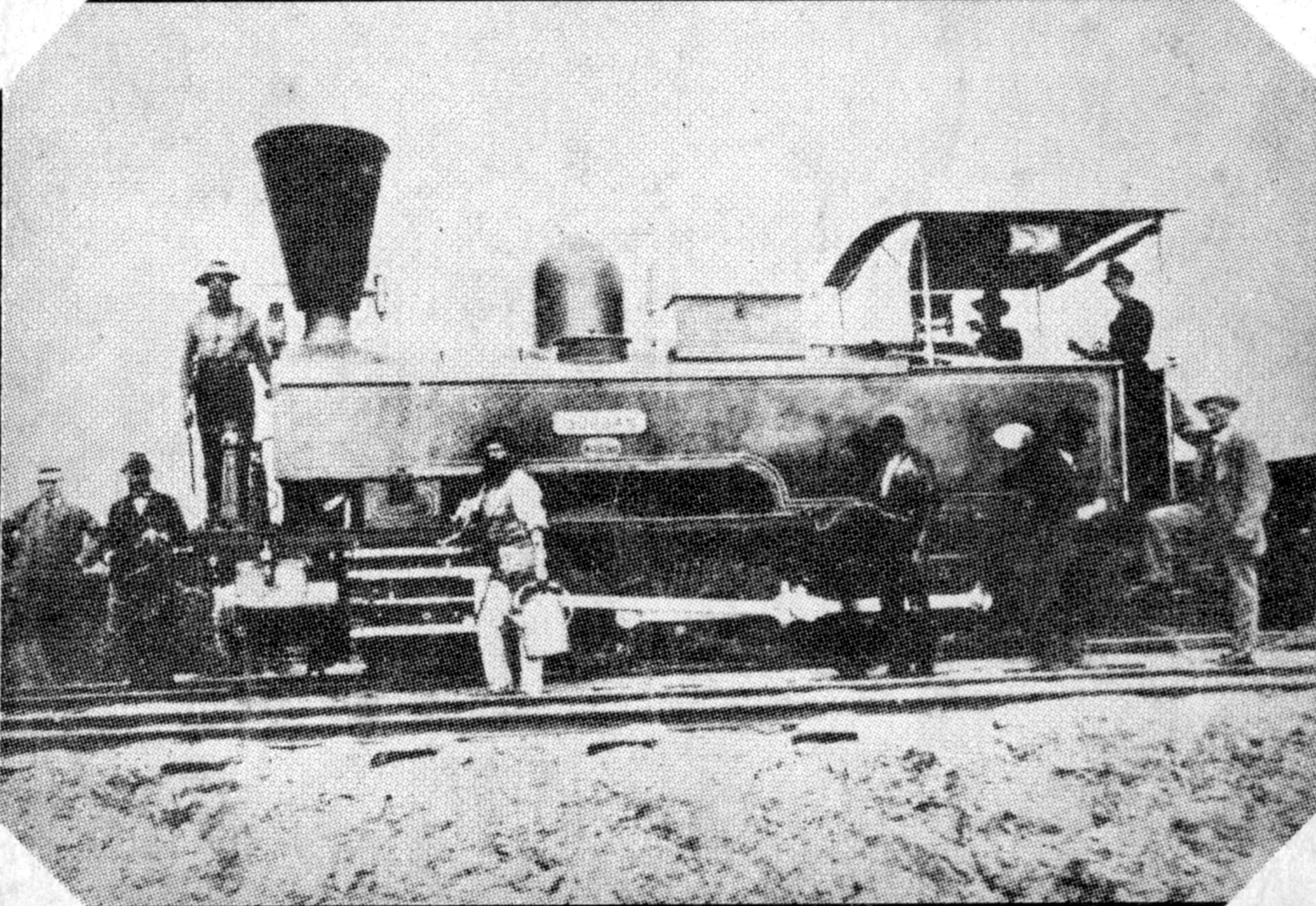
The engine Durban, c. 1878

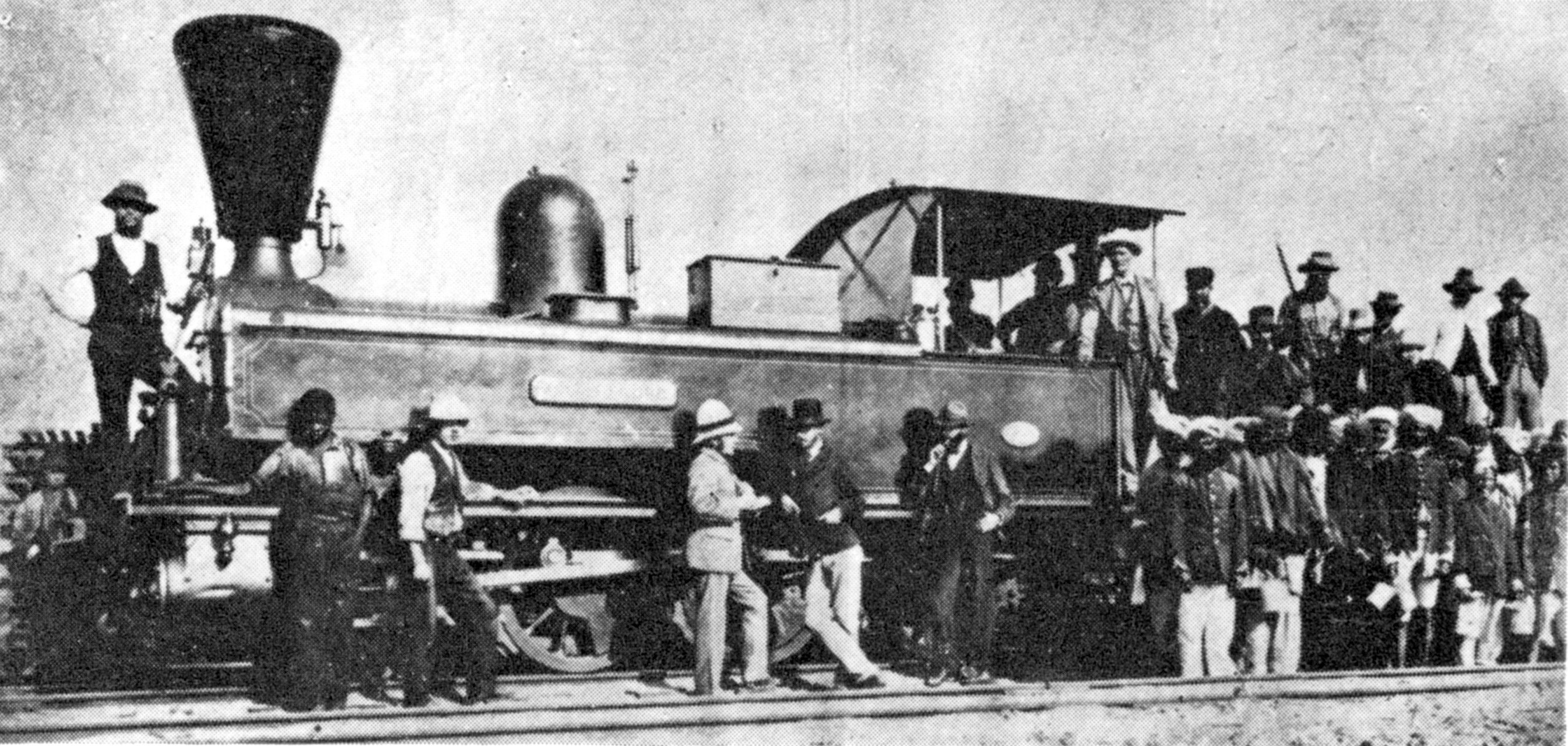
The engine Pietermaritzburg, c. 1878

Camperdown was reached on 1 October 1880, and the Colony's Capital Pietermaritzburg on 1 December of that same year.

=== Natal Government Railways ===
Upon completion of the contract, the two locomotives, as well as a third locomotive named Ulundi, were taken over by the Natal Government Railways (NGR). The locomotives retained their names, but the NGR also numbered them 19 (Durban) and 20 (Pietermaritzburg).

Reference to the third locomotive named Ulundi was made in the 1880 annual report of the NGR, in which mention was made of three locomotives which were to be taken over from the contractors. In the report, the locomotive name is mentioned in the description of an executives' excursion train which it hauled from Wallace Town to Botha's Hill station, crossing six of the seven viaducts near Inchanga. To date, the identity and configuration of this locomotive could not be established, although it has been suggested that it might possibly have been the 4 feet 8½ inches broad gauge 0-4-0ST Durban of the Natal Railway Company which had been regauged to Cape gauge and renamed Ulundi.

=== Selati Railway ===
In June 1890, Eugene, the younger of the Barons Oppenheim, sought to obtain a concession from the Government of the Zuid-Afrikaansche Republiek to construct a line to the Murchison Range goldfields along the Selati River. Work on the construction of the Selati Railway in the Transvaal Lowveld began early in 1893, with the line branching off from the Pretoria-Delagoa Bay mainline at a junction near Komatipoort. The two locomotives Durban and Pietermaritzburg were purchased from the NGR for use during construction, along with two 40 Tonner locomotives which were acquired from the Nederlandsche-Zuid-Afrikaansche Spoorweg-Maatschappij (NZASM).

The project was abandoned in 1894 due to financial difficulties as well as a dispute which arose with the NZASM over the chosen route. Work on the line was only resumed and completed by the Central South African Railways in 1909. The line was then extended via Gravelotte and Tzaneen to a junction at Soekmekaar, where it met the line from Pietersburg to Messina in 1912. In 1963, the part of the line through the southern part of the Kruger National Park from the junction near Komatipoort was abandoned and replaced by a new line from the present junction near Kaapmuiden.
