= Braamfontein Explosion =

Explosion in Braamfontein

Coordinates: 26.198°S 28.022°E

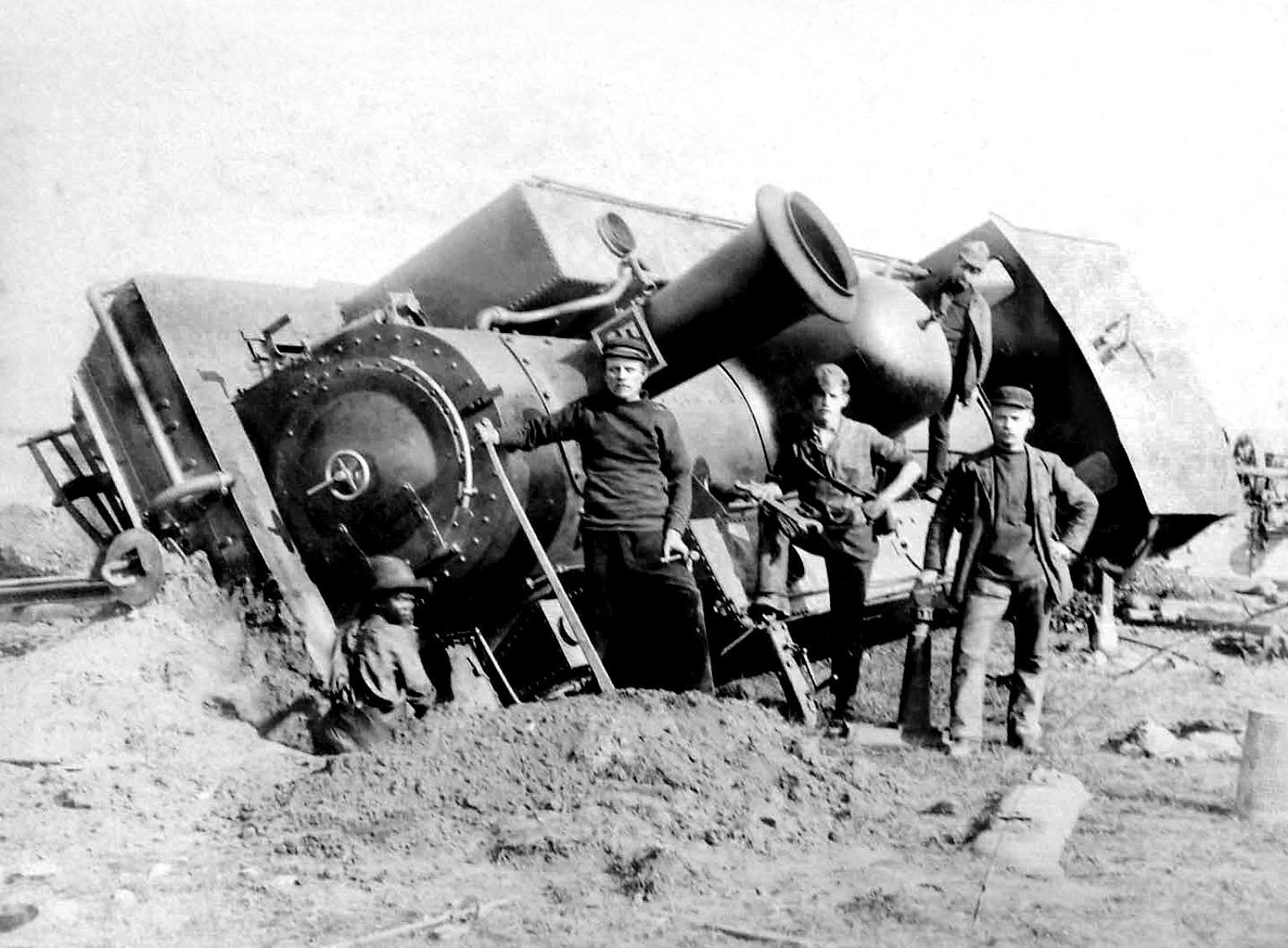
NZASM 40 Tonner locomotive being recovered at Braamfontein after the explosion

The Braamfontein Explosion was an explosion of a freight train carrying dynamite in Braamfontein, a suburb of Johannesburg, in 1896. It was one of the largest non-nuclear explosions in history.

== Explosion ==
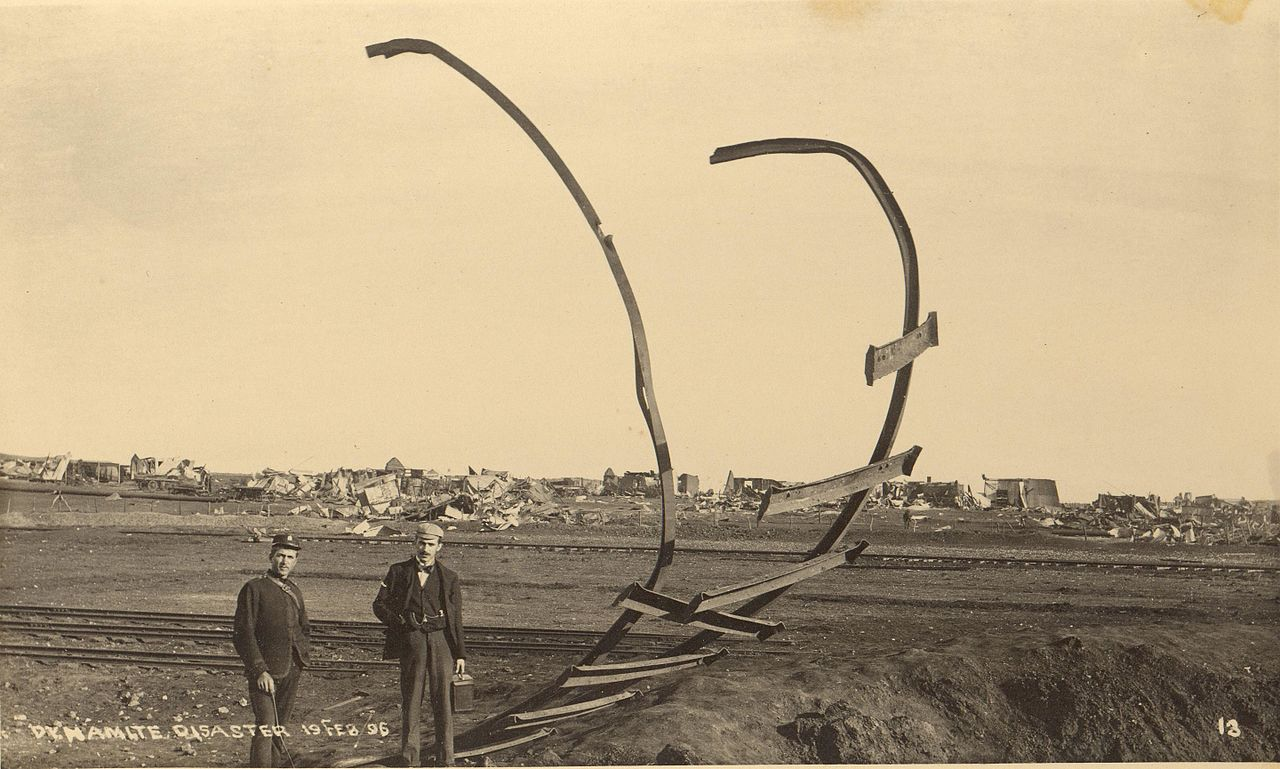
Part of the track where the explosion took place at Braamfontein on 19 February 1896

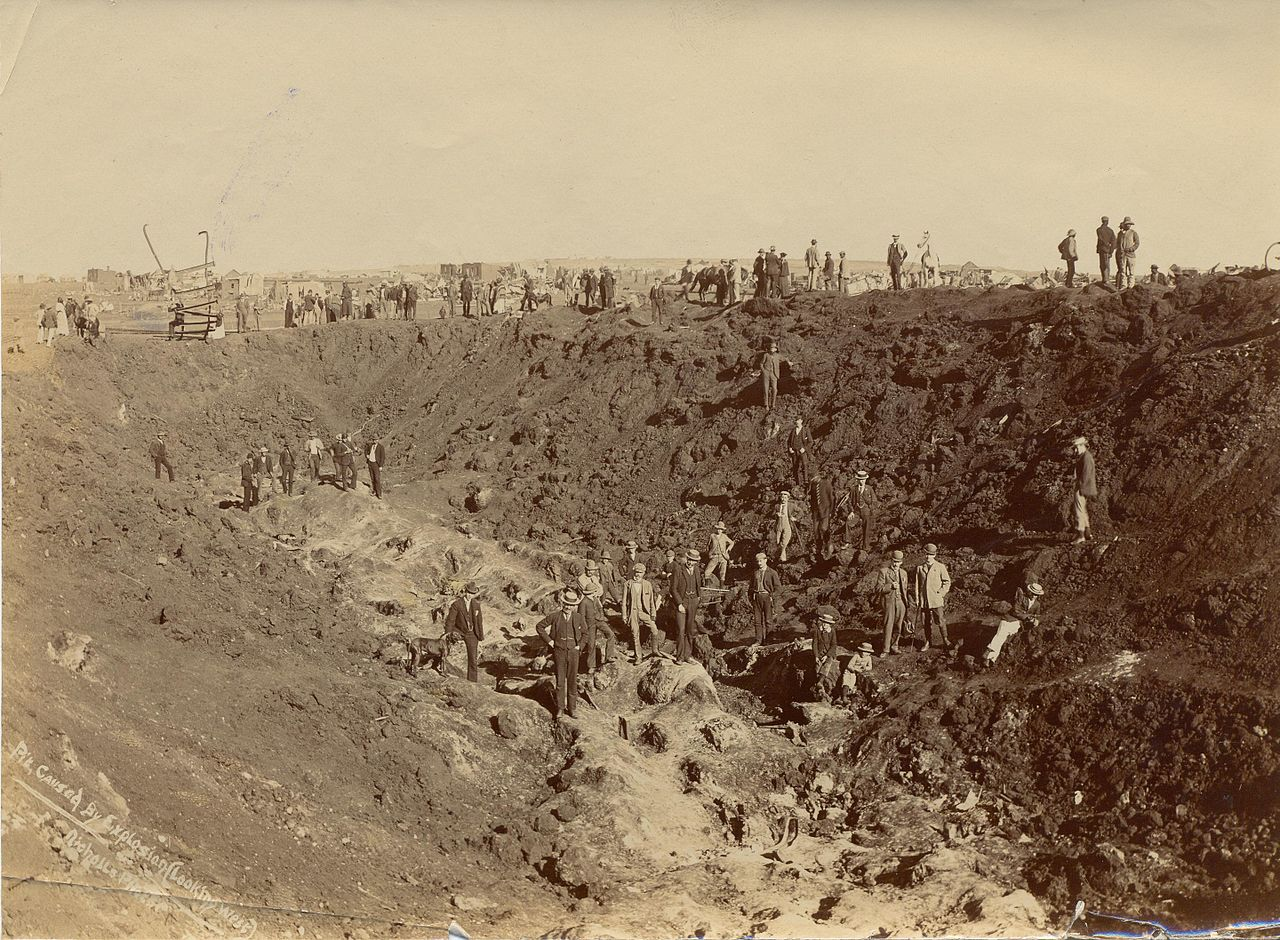
The crater created by the dynamite explosion (looking west) at Braamfontein on 19 February 1896

On 16 February 1896, a freight train with eight trucks of dynamite – 2300 cases of 60lb each, or about 60 tonnes – was put in a siding at Braamfontein railway station. The dynamite was destined for nearby mines, but the mine's stores of dynamite were already full so the train was left in the siding – for days, in very hot weather – until there was somewhere to store the dynamite.

On the afternoon of 19 February, after labourers had started to unload the train, a shunter came to move it to another part of the siding; but after the impact of the shunter, the dynamite exploded. The explosion left a crater 60 metres long, 50 metres wide and 8 metres deep. The explosion was heard up to 200 kilometres away. Herman Eugene Schoch recorded hearing the explosion in Rustenburg, approximately 120 kilometres (75 mi) away.

Suburbs as far away as Fordsburg were seriously damaged, and about 3,000 people lost their homes.

== Memorials ==
Accounts vary, but it is thought that over 70 people were killed and more than 200 were injured. A memorial at the Braamfontein cemetery reads that 75 "whites and coloured" were killed.

In 2012, artist Eduardo Cachuco created "Explosion, 1896", a complex artwork based on the explosion which was shown at the "looking glass" exhibition.
