= 1895 in South Africa =

- Decades: 1870s; 1880s; 1890s; 1900s; 1910s
- See also: List of years in South Africa

The following lists events that happened during 1895 in South Africa.

== Incumbents ==
- Governor of the Cape of Good Hope and High Commissioner for Southern Africa:Hercules Robinson.
- Governor of the Colony of Natal: Charles Bullen Hugh Mitchell.
- State President of the Orange Free State: Francis William Reitz (until 11 December), Pieter Jeremias Blignaut (starting 11 December).
- State President of the South African Republic: Paul Kruger.
- Prime Minister of the Cape of Good Hope: Cecil John Rhodes.
- Prime Minister of the Colony of Natal: .

== Events ==
April

- 13 – The first electrical street lights in Cape Town are switched on.

June

- 11 – Britain annexes Tongaland, between Zululand and Mozambique.

December

- 15 – The railways of the Cape Colony, Natal, the Orange Free State, the South African Republic and southern Mozambique are all linked at Union Junction near Alberton, completing the logistics supply lines for the British military invasion of the Boer Republics in the Second Boer War.
- 29 – The Jameson Raid is launched when Leander Starr Jameson and his forces cross into Transvaal from Bechuanaland.

Unknown date

- St. Lucia Game Reserve, 30 km north of the town St. Lucia is proclaimed.
- The Hluhluwe Game Reserve is proclaimed.
- The Umfolozi Game Reserve is proclaimed.

== Births ==
- 7 April – Matthew Frew, Air Vice Marshal of the South African Air Force. (d. 1974)

== Railways ==
=== Railway lines opened ===
- 1 December – Natal – Charlestown to Natal-Transvaal border, 2 miles 45 chains (4.1 kilometres).

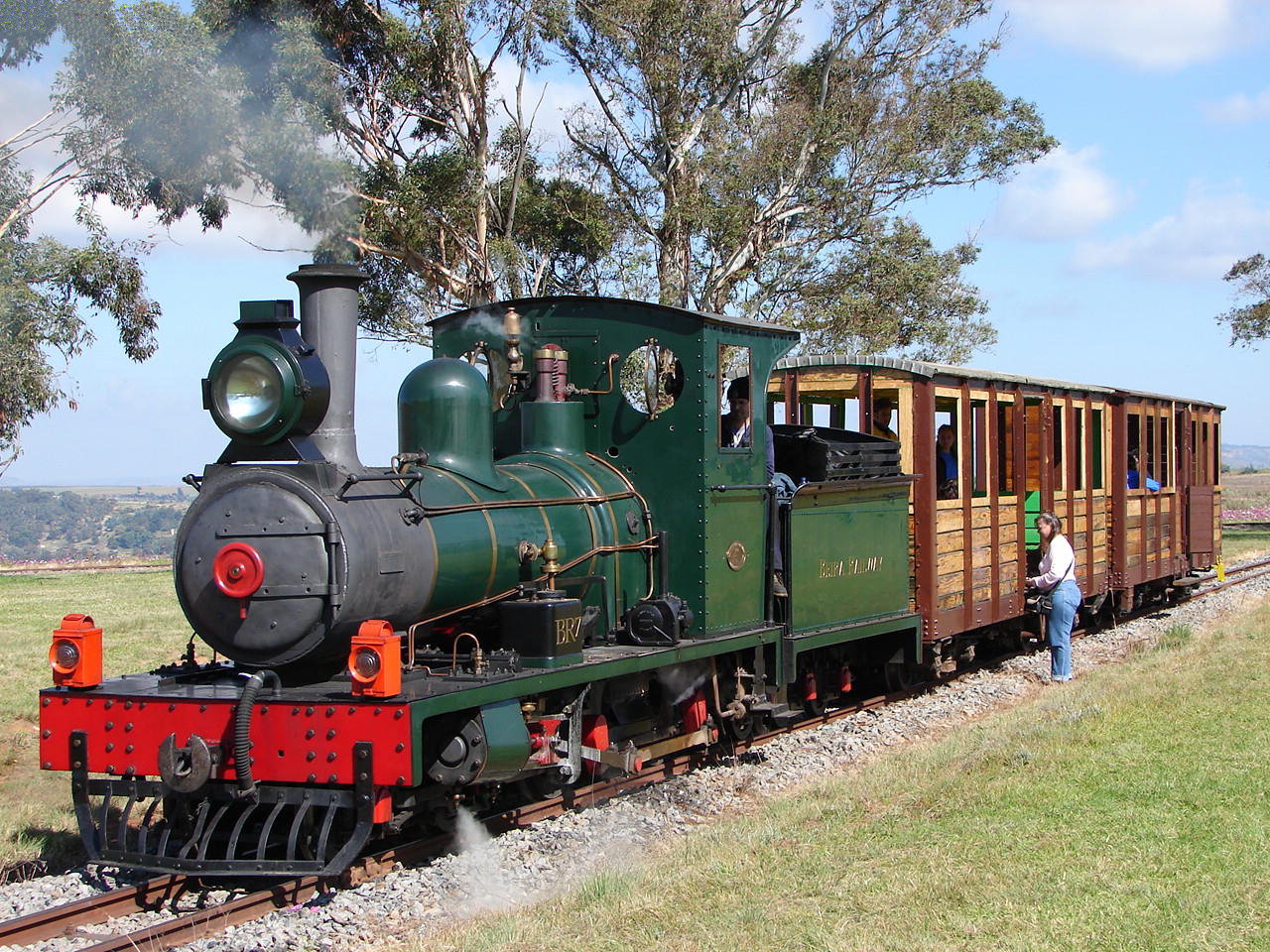
SAR Class NG6

- 15 December – Transvaal – Natal-Transvaal border to Union Junction near Alberton, 157 miles (252.7 kilometres).

=== Locomotives ===
- Pauling and Company places the first of 42 4-4-0 American type 2 ft (610 mm) narrow gauge locomotives in service on the Beira Railway in Mozambique. In 1915, 13 of these locomotives, later designated Class NG6 on the SAR, will be acquired by the Union Defence Force for use in South Africa to replace locomotives that will be commandeered for the war effort in German South West Africa during the First World War.
