= Sport in pre-union South Africa =

Sport in pre-union South Africa saw some of South Africa's major sports, cricket, rugby union, and football being introduced by British settlers following the British takeover of the Cape Colony. A cricket club was established as early as 1857 in Cape Town and the English cricket team made a 1888-89 cricket tour to South Africa. Rugby was first played in the Cape Colony around 1875 and 1889 saw the creation of South Africa's first rugby board. The first documented soccer matches were played in 1862 by white soldiers in Port Elizabeth and Cape Town and the South African Football Association was established in 1892. Soccer soon spread to other colonies in South Africa and matches were played in the Transvaal Colony and the Orange Free State in the late 1800s to the early 1900s. The first participants in an Olympic Games for South Africa were prisoners of war from the South African War who ran a marathon in 1904. The independent colonies in South Africa were amalgamated in 1910 to form the Union of South Africa.

== Football (Rugby Union) ==
=== 1891 ===
- 30 July 1891 – South Africa, in their first international match, loses to British and Irish Lions 0–4 at Port Elizabeth during the British Tour of South Africa
- South Africa loses to British and Irish Lions 0–2 at Kimberley during the British Tour of South Africa
- South Africa loses to British and Irish Lions 0–4 at Cape Town during the British Tour of South Africa

=== 1896 ===
- 30 July 1896 – South Africa loses to British and Irish Lions 0–8 at Port Elizabeth during the British Tour of South Africa

=== 1906 ===
- 17 November 1906 – South Africa for the first time as the de Springbokken plays against Scotland at Hampden Park in Glasgow and lose 0–6
- 24 November – de Springbokken beat Ireland 15–12 in Ireland

== See also ==
- List of years in South African sport
- List of years in South Africa
