= PPR 26 Tonner 0-6-0ST =

South African steam locomotive

PPR 26 Tonner 0-6-0ST NZASM 26 Tonner 0-6-0ST IMR 0-6-0ST 1896 CSAR 0-6-0ST 1896 South African 0-6-0ST 1896
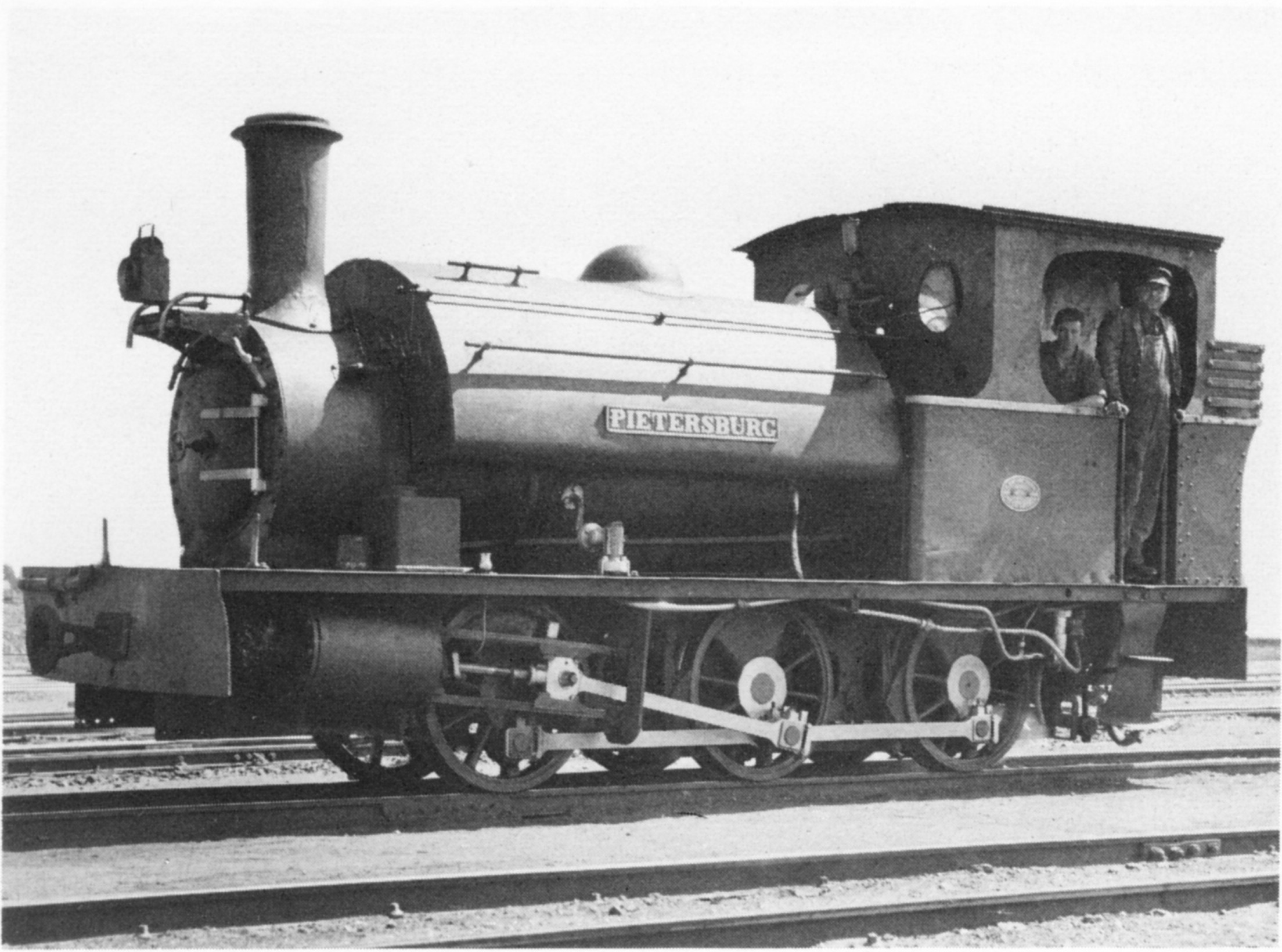
- Pretoria-Pietersburg Railway's Pietersburg, c. 1940
Type and origin
- Power type: Steam
- Designer: Hawthorn, Leslie and Company
- Builder: Hawthorn, Leslie and Company
- Serial number: 2346, 2369, 2370
- Build date: 1896–1897
- Total produced: 3
Specifications
- Configuration
  - Whyte: 0-6-0ST
  - UIC: Cn2t
- Driver: 2nd coupled axle
- Gauge: 3 ft 6 in (1,067 mm) Cape gauge
- Coupled dia.: 42 in (1,067 mm)
- Wheelbase: 10 ft 5 1/2 in (3,188 mm)
  - Axle spacing (Asymmetrical): 1-2: 5 ft 5 in (1,651 mm); 2-3: 5 ft 1/2 in (1,537 mm)
- Length
  - Over couplers: 25 ft 1/2 in (7,633 mm)
- Height: 11 ft 1 3/4 in (3,397 mm)
- Frame type: Plate
- Axle load: 9 LT 6 cwt (9,449 kg)
  - 1st coupled: 8 LT 7 cwt (8,484 kg)
  - 2nd coupled: 9 LT 6 cwt (9,449 kg)
  - 3rd coupled: 8 LT 7 cwt (8,484 kg)
- Adhesive weight: 26 LT (26,420 kg)
- Loco weight: 26 LT (26,420 kg)
- Fuel type: Coal
- Fuel capacity: 1 LT 10 cwt (1.5 t)
- Water cap.: 620 imp gal (2,820 L)
- Firebox
  - Type: Round-top
  - Grate area: 8.3 sq ft (0.77 m^{2})
- Boiler
  - Pitch: 5 ft 10 in (1,778 mm)
  - Diameter: 3 ft 4 in (1,016 mm)
  - Tube plates: 8 ft 10 5/16 in (2,700 mm)
  - Small tubes: 130: 1 3/4 in (44 mm)
- Boiler pressure: 140 psi (965 kPa)
- Heating surface
  - Firebox: 48.7 sq ft (4.52 m^{2})
  - Tubes: 527.9 sq ft (49.04 m^{2})
  - Total surface: 576.6 sq ft (53.568 m^{2})
- Cylinders: Two
- Cylinder size: 14 in (356 mm) bore 20 in (508 mm) stroke
- Valve gear: Stephenson
- Valve type: Slide
- Couplers: Johnston link-and-pin
Performance figures
- Tractive effort: 9,800 lbf (44 kN) @ 75%
Career
- Operators: Pretoria-Pietersburg Railway; NZASM; Imperial Military Railways; Central South African Railways; South African Railways
- Class: PPR 26 Tonner
- Number in class: 3
- Official name: Pretoria, Pietersburg & Nylstroom
- Delivered: 1896–1897
- First run: 1896
- For lack of a classification, these locomotives are referred to as 26 Tonners, since the NZASM, who took possession of the PPR, classified its own locomotives according to their weight

The Pretoria-Pietersburg Railway 26 Tonner 0-6-0ST of 1896 was a South African steam locomotive from the pre-Union era in Transvaal.

In 1896 and 1897, the Pretoria-Pietersburg Railway in the Zuid-Afrikaansche Republiek placed three 26 Tonner 0-6-0ST locomotives in service. These locomotives were not classified and, since all three were named, they were referred to by name.

== The Pretoria-Pietersburg Railway ==
The Pretoria-Pietersburg Railway Company (PPR), incorporated in London on 13 May 1896 with a capital of £500,000, constructed a railway which operated northward from Pretoria West via Warmbad and Nylstroom to Pietersburg. The 176-mile-long (283-kilometre) line was constructed under a concession granted by the government of the Zuid-Afrikaansche Republiek (ZAR) to Hendrik Jacobus Schoeman on 30 October 1895. Construction commenced in 1897 and the first 80 miles (130 kilometres) to Nylstroom was opened to traffic on 1 July 1898. The remaining 96 miles (154 kilometres) to Pietersburg was completed on 31 May 1899.

On 1 May 1899, the southern terminus of the PPR at Pretoria West was connected to Pretoria station of the NZASM by a link line, constructed at the cost of the PPR. Mr. G. Mayo was appointed as the General Manager of the PPR, and the official opening of the whole line took place on 21 May 1899.

== Manufacturer ==
The first locomotives of the PPR were three 26 Tonner 0-6-0ST engines which were built by Hawthorn, Leslie and Company, one in 1896 and the other two in 1897. They were employed as construction locomotives while the line was being built and were not classified or numbered, but named Pretoria, Pietersburg and Nylstroom.

== Characteristics ==
The engine's cylinders were inclined and arranged outside the 7/8 inch (22 millimetres) thick plate frames. The steam chests were arranged between the frames, with the slide valves being actuated by Stephenson valve gear through rocker shafts.

== Service ==
=== NZASM ===
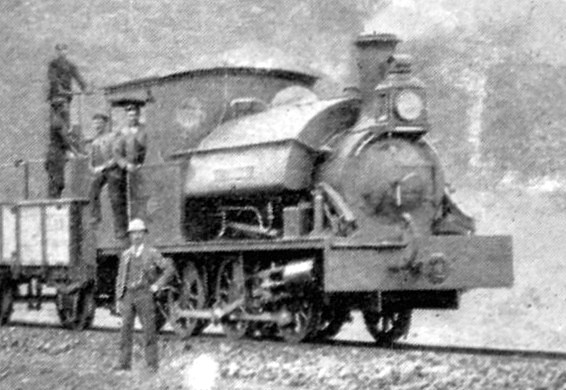

As a result of the outbreak of the Second Boer War in 1899 and since the PPR was owned by a British registered company, the railway and its rolling stock were seized by the ZAR government in October 1899, only five months after the railway was completed to Pietersburg. The railway was then worked briefly by the Nederlandsche-Zuid-Afrikaansche Spoorweg-Maatschappij (NZASM), until that railway was itself seized by the invading British military forces towards the end of the same year.

=== Imperial Military Railways ===
All railway operations in the two Boer Republics, the ZAR and the Orange Free State, were taken over by the Imperial Military Railways (IMR) in 1899 and operated by the invading military for the duration of the war.

=== Central South African Railways ===
At least two of the three locomotives survived the war. At the end of the war, the IMR was transformed into the Central South African Railways (CSAR).

=== South African Railways ===
When the Union of South Africa was established on 31 May 1910, the three Colonial government railways (CGR, Natal Government Railways and CSAR) were united under a single administration to control and administer the railways, ports and harbours of the Union. Although the South African Railways and Harbours came into existence in 1910, the actual classification and renumbering of all the rolling stock of the three constituent railways were only implemented with effect from 1 January 1912.

Two of the locomotives, the engines Nylstroom and Pietersburg, survived in railway service to be taken onto the South African Railways (SAR) roster in 1912. Since they were considered obsolete, they were excluded from the SAR classification and renumbering list. In spite of being obsolete, both of them survived in SAR service into the 1940s, employed as shunting engines at the Salvokop workshops in Pretoria and to test the steam heating system of passenger trains.

Upon their eventual retirement, the engines Nylstroom and Pietersburg were plinthed outside the Nylstroom and Pietersburg stations respectively.

== Works numbers ==
The 26 Tonner names, works numbers and years built are as follows:

- The engine Pretoria – 2346 of 1896.
- The engine Pietersburg – 2369 of 1897.
- The engine Nylstroom – 2370 of 1897.

== Illustration ==
All three 26 Tonner locomotives are illustrated in the following photographs.

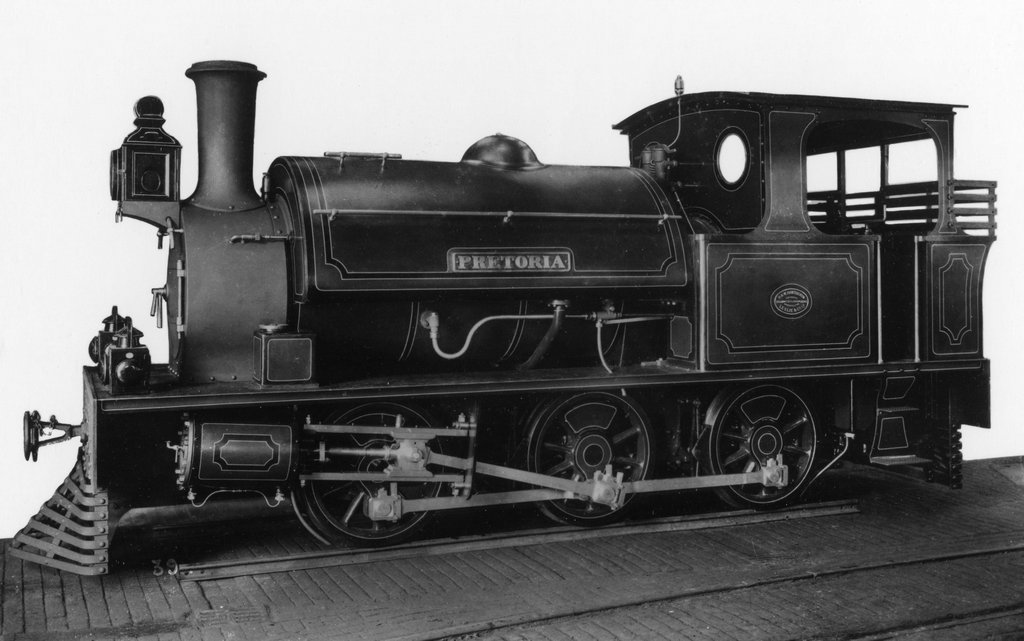
Hawthorn Leslie builder's picture of the engine Pretoria, c. 1896

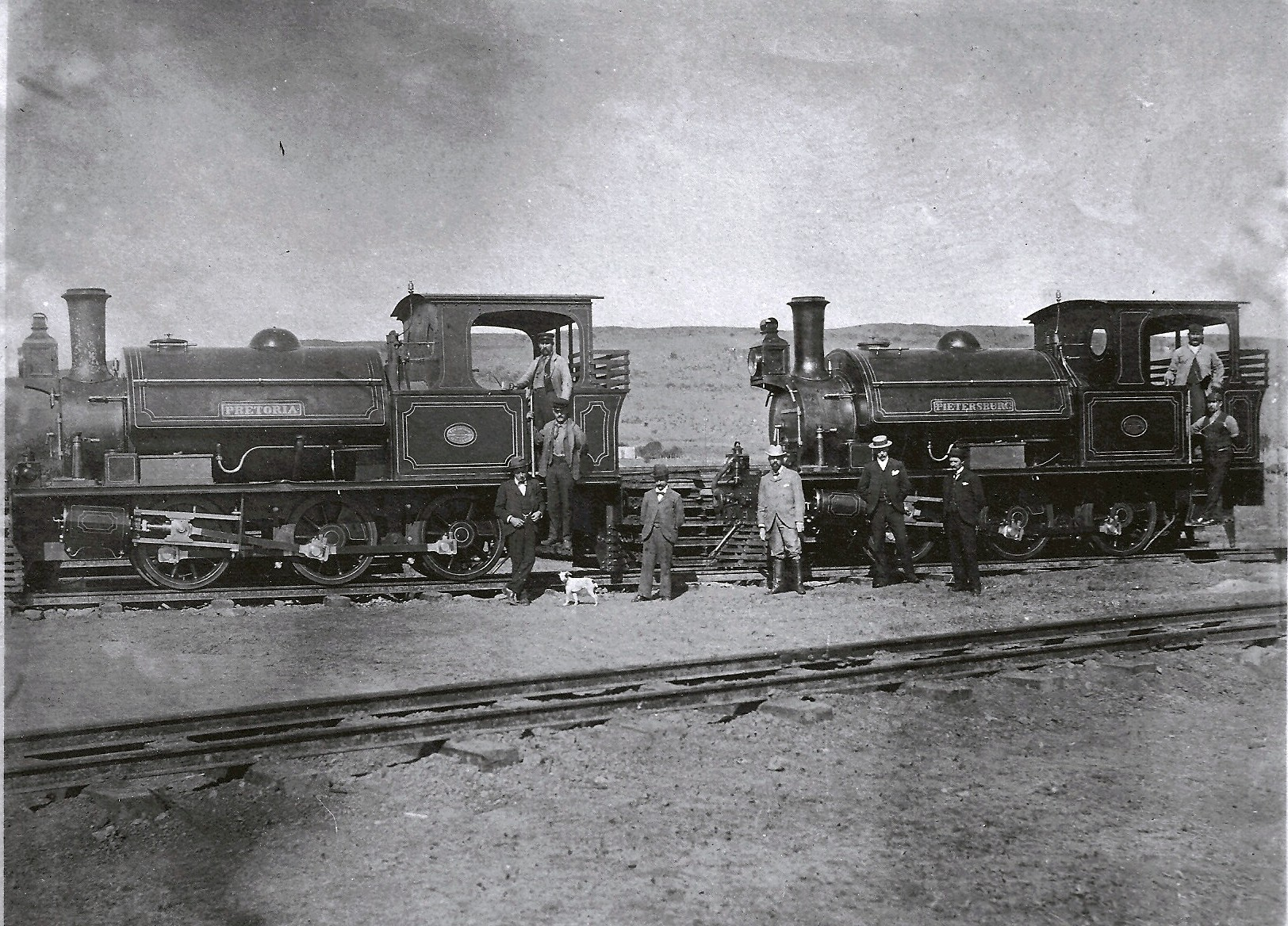
The engines "Pretoria" and "Pietersburg", c. 1897

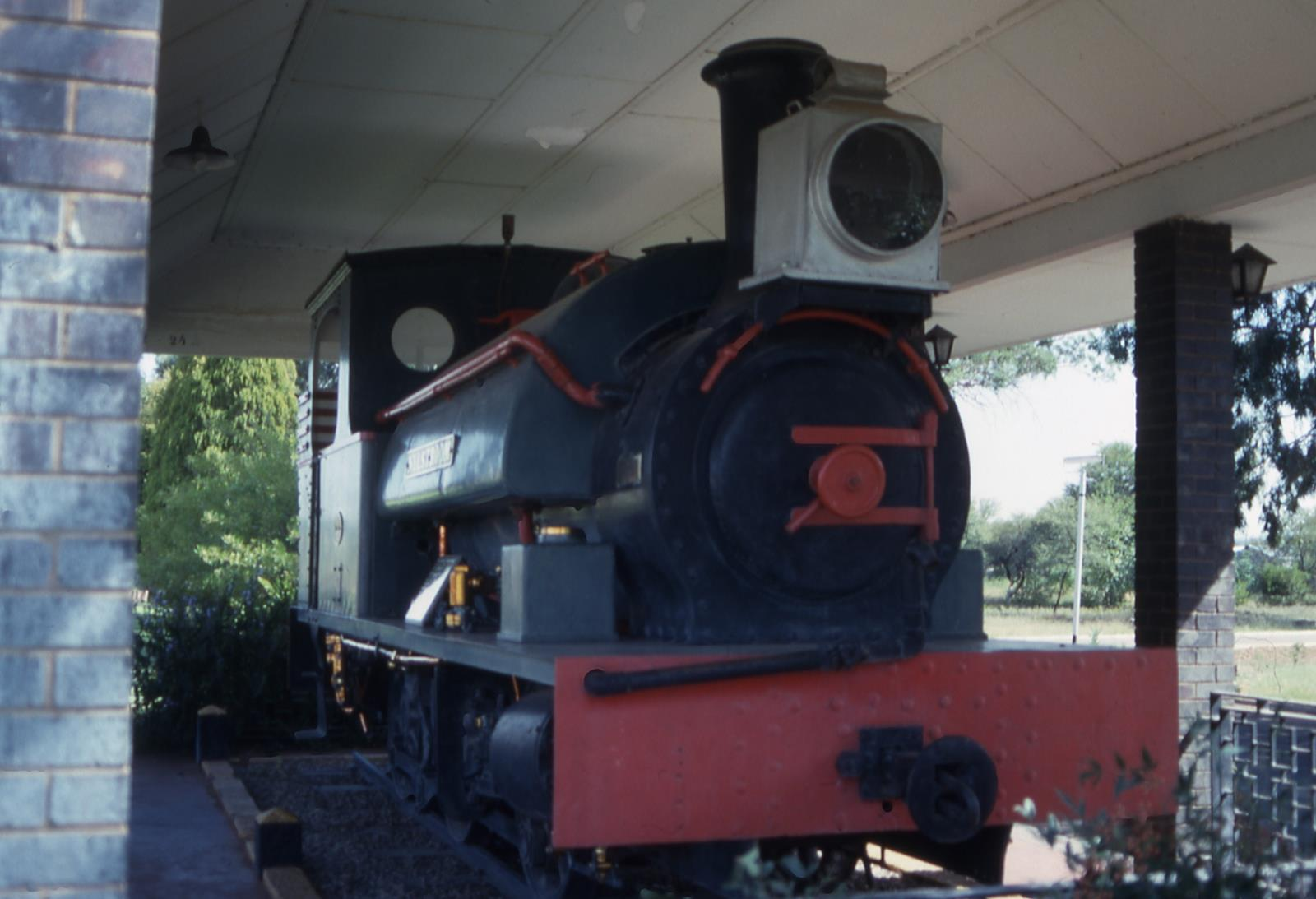
The Nylstroom, plinthed at Nylstroom station, 28 April 1992

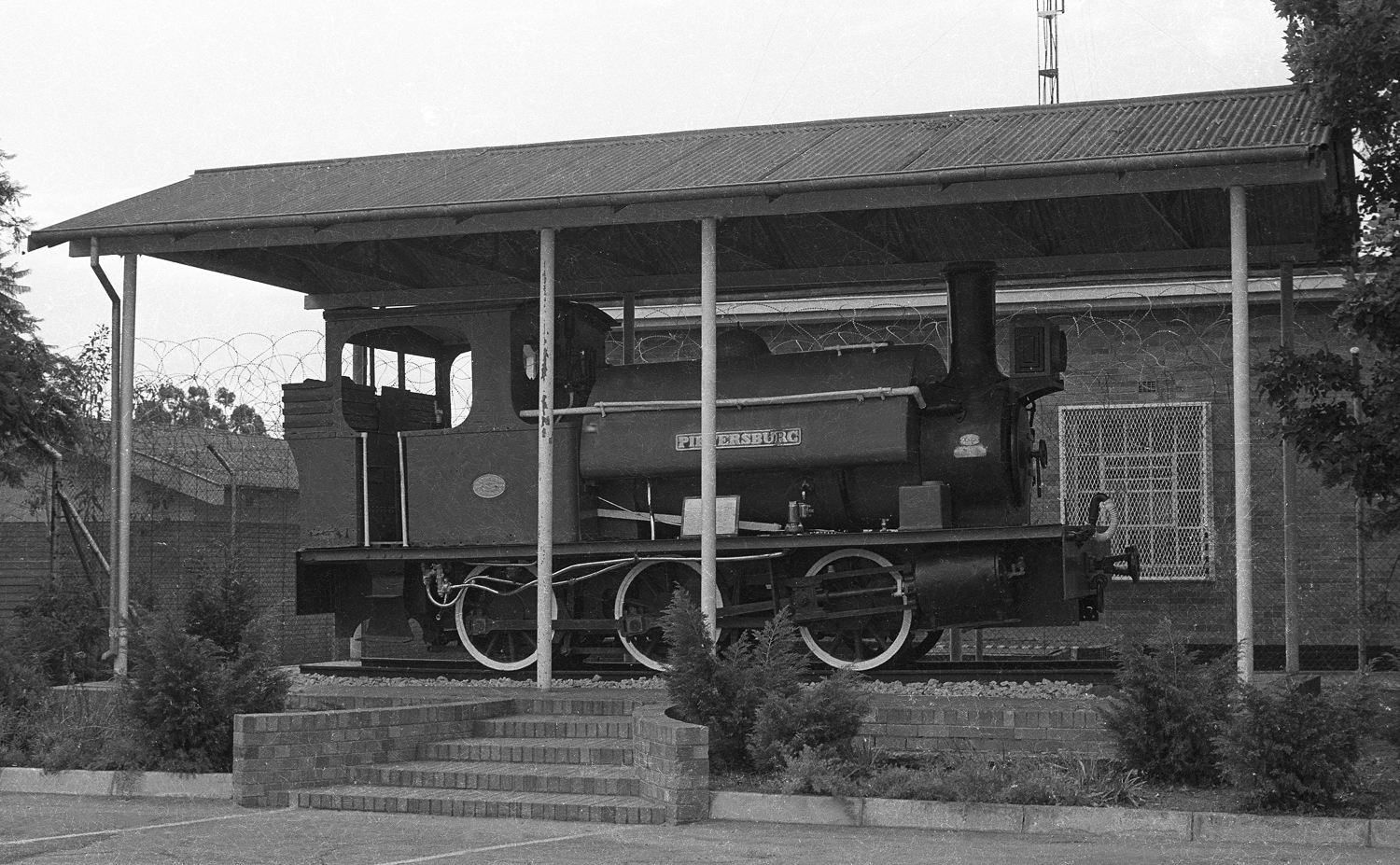
The Pietersburg, plinthed at Pietersburg station, 3 February 1992
