= Metropolitan & Suburban 4-6-2T =

Type of steam locomotive

Metropolitan & Suburban 4-6-2T Mashonaland Railway 4-6-2T
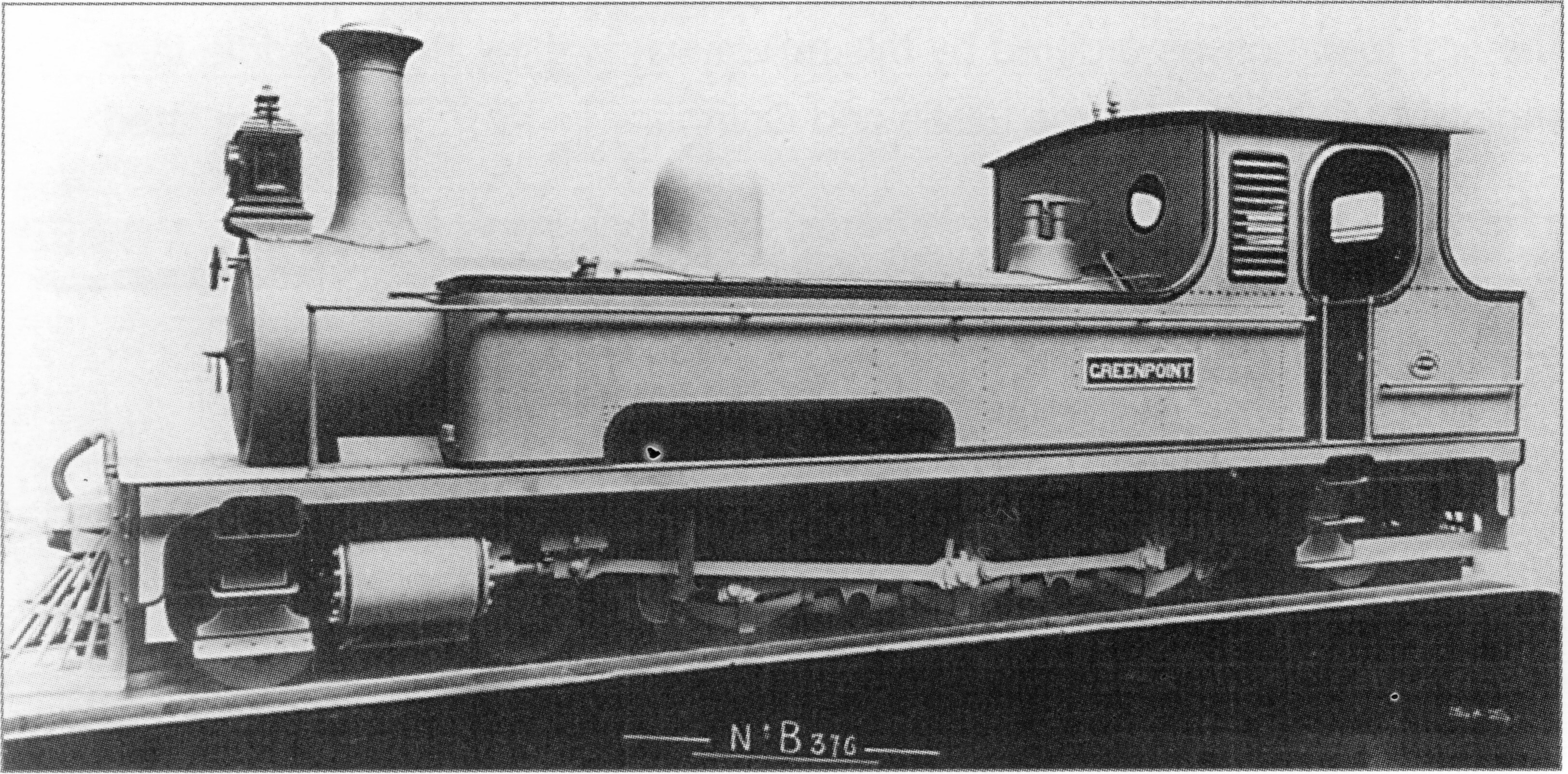
- Metropolitan & Suburban 4-6-2T Greenpoint, c. 1896
Type and origin
- Power type: Steam
- Designer: John Fowler & Co.
- Builder: John Fowler & Co.
- Serial number: 7450–7451
- Build date: 1896
- Total produced: 2
Specifications
- Configuration
  - Whyte: 4-6-2T (Pacific)
  - UIC: 2'C1'n2t
- Driver: 2nd coupled axle
- Gauge: 3 ft 6 in (1,067 mm) Cape gauge
- Leading dia.: 25 1/2 in (648 mm)
- Coupled dia.: 48 in (1,219 mm)
- Trailing dia.: 30 in (762 mm)
- Wheelbase: 25 ft 9 in (7,849 mm)
  - Leading: 4 ft 9 in (1,448 mm)
  - Coupled: 10 ft (3,048 mm)
- Length
  - Over couplers: 33 ft 9 in (10,287 mm)
- Height: 12 ft 2 in (3,708 mm)
- Frame type: Plate
- Fuel type: Coal
- Firebox
  - Type: Round-top
- Boiler
  - Pitch: 5 ft 6 in (1,676 mm)
- Boiler pressure: 140 psi (965 kPa)
- Safety valve: Ramsbottom
- Cylinders: Two
- Cylinder size: 18 1/2 in (470 mm) bore 20 in (508 mm) stroke
- Couplers: Johnston link-and-pin
Performance figures
- Tractive effort: 17,515 lbf (77.91 kN) @ 75%
Career
- Operators: Metropolitan & Suburban Railway; Mashonaland Railway
- Number in class: 2
- Official name: M&S Seapoint & Greenpont; MR Inyanga & Paulington
- Delivered: 1896
- First run: 1896

The Metropolitan & Suburban 4-6-2T of 1896 was a South African steam locomotive from the pre-Union era in the Cape of Good Hope.

In 1896, two 4-6-2 Pacific type tank locomotives entered service on the Metropolitan and Suburban Railway, which operated a suburban passenger service between Cape Town and Sea Point. In 1901, both locomotives were sold to the Mashonaland Railway.

== Metropolitan & Suburban Railway ==
In 1887, the Green and Seapoint Company began the construction of the Sea Point Line, a railway line from Cape Town to Sea Point, with the aim to provide a suburban train service to the expanding urban area along the coast behind Signal Hill and Lion's Head. A line of just over 3 5/8 miles (5.8 kilometres) long was constructed before the company ran into financial difficulty and abandoned the project.

A second enterprise, the Cape Town and Suburban Railway Company, took over the track with plans to extend it, but it failed to have trains running by the 1888 deadline stipulated by the Cape Government and so also went out of business.

A third company, the Metropolitan and Suburban Railway Company, was formed to carry on with the line and it was finally opened to public traffic in September 1892. The first locomotives were a pair of 1875 1st Class 4-4-0T engines, numbers 3 and 4, which were acquired from the Cape Government Railways. These were used during construction and, once the line was opened, also in revenue service.

== Manufacturer ==
Two 4-6-2 Pacific type tank locomotives, built by John Fowler and Company with works numbers 7450 and 7451, were delivered to the Metropolitan and Suburban Railway Company in 1896, at a purchase price of £2,167 6s 1d each. The locomotives were named Seapoint and Greenpoint respectively.

== Service ==
=== Sea Point Line ===
The engines Seapoint and Greenpoint were placed in service in 1896, but they derailed regularly since the curves in the tracks leading up from the Table Bay Harbour dock area to Green Point Common proved to be too sharp for their 16-foot-8-inch-long (5,080-millimetre) coupled-and-trailing wheelbase. They were therefore soon withdrawn from service and staged, awaiting sale.

The railway itself faced stiff competition from the newly introduced tram service and went out of business in 1898, after a train collision which resulted in serious injury to a solicitor. The matter ended in litigation, with a judgment against the railway for £3,000 in damages.

The Sea Point line was resuscitated by the Cape Government Railways in 1905 and, in 1927, was even electrified by the South African Railways at considerable expense, but it was never profitable and was finally closed in 1929.

=== Mashonaland Railway ===
The two locomotives were purchased by the Mashonaland Railway in 1901. The engine Seapoint became Mashonaland no. 5 and was renamed Inyanga, while the engine Greenpoint became no. 6 and was renamed Paulington. They remained in service on the Mashonaland Railway into the early 1920s. The engine Inyanga was sold in November 1921 and the engine Paulington in August 1924, both to a contractor in Elisabethville in the Belgian Congo.

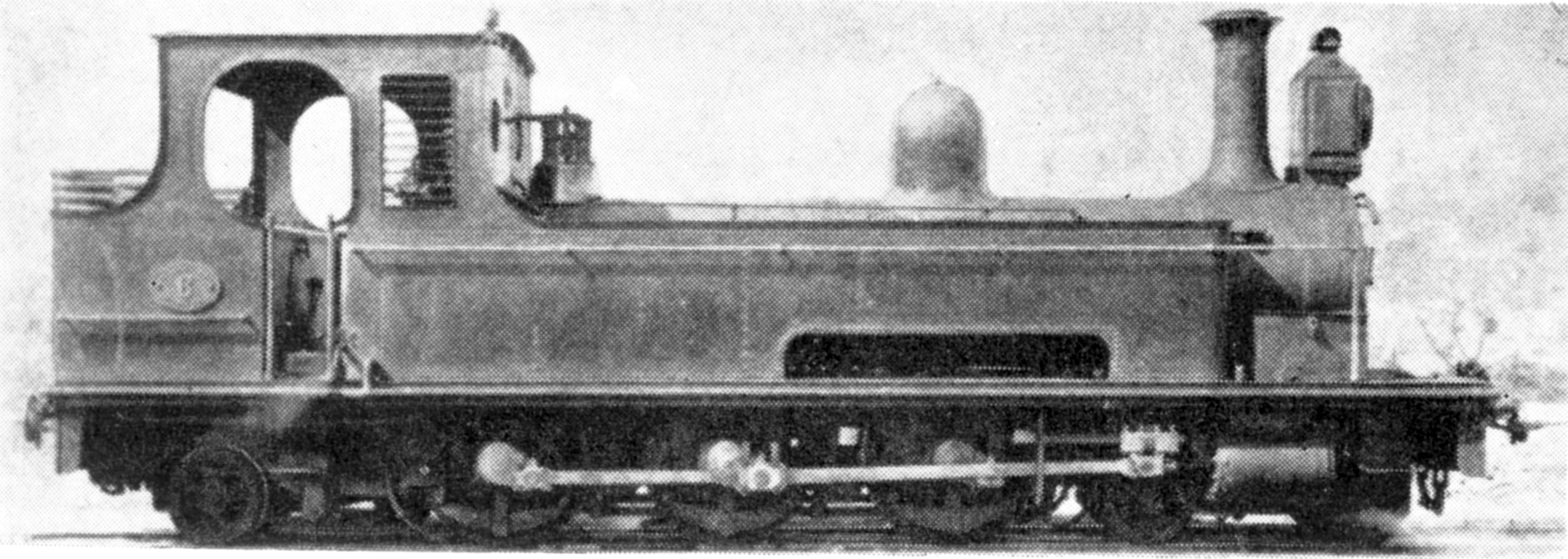
Ex Metropolitan & Suburban Greenpoint as Mashonaland Railway no. 6 "Paulington"
