= NZASM 40 Tonner 0-6-2T =

Type of steam locomotive

NZASM 40 Tonner 0-6-2T CSAR Class A 0-6-2T
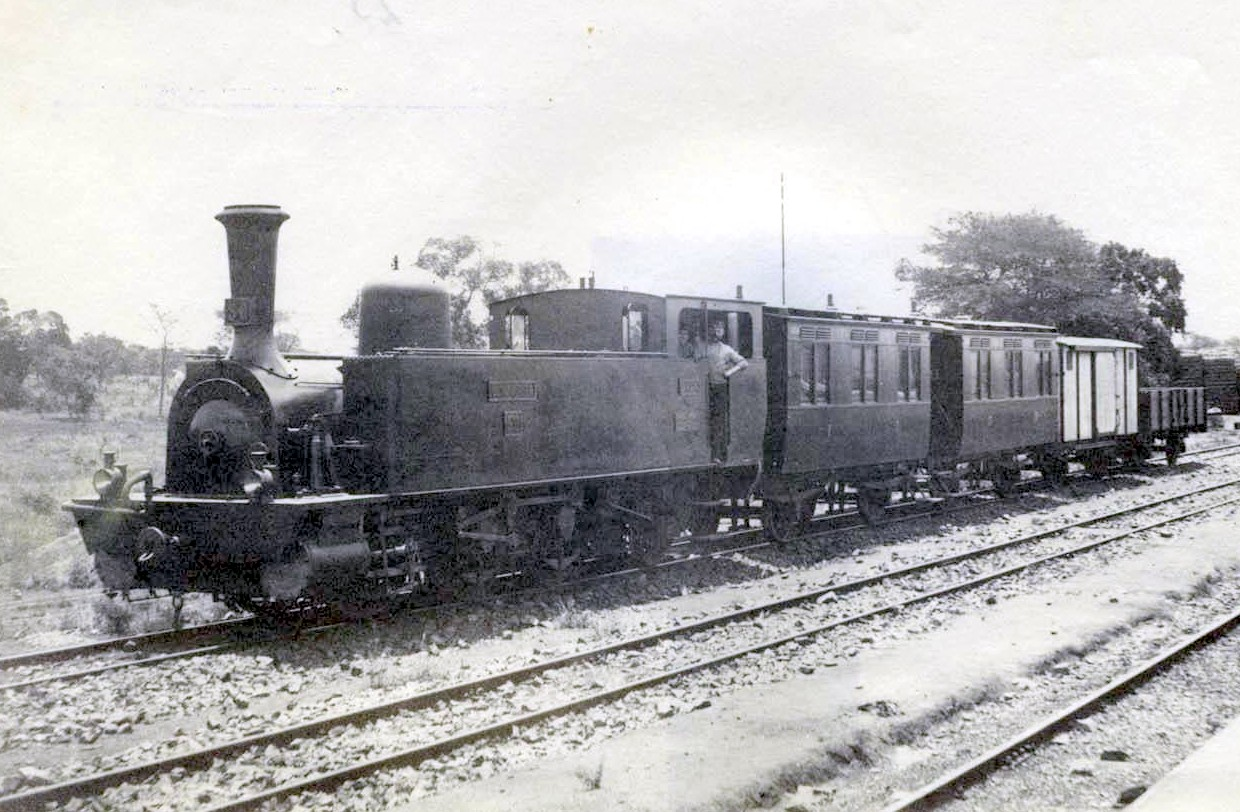
- 40 Tonner no. 50 S.W. Burger, Komatipoort, c. 1895
Type and origin
- Power type: Steam
- Designer: Maschinenfabrik Esslingen
- Builder: Maschinenfabrik Esslingen
- Serial number: Esslingen 2436–2445, 2480–2489
- Build date: 1891–1892
- Total produced: 20
Specifications
- Configuration
  - Whyte: 0-6-2T
  - UIC: C1n2t
- Driver: 2nd coupled axle
- Gauge: 3 ft 6 in (1,067 mm) Cape gauge
- Coupled dia.: 51 3/16 in (1,300 mm)
- Trailing dia.: 31 1/2 in (800 mm)
- Wheelbase: 18 ft 10 3/8 in (5,750 mm)
  - Axle spacing (Asymmetrical): 1–2: 5 ft 10 3/32 in (1,780 mm); 2–3: 5 ft 3 25/32 in (1,620 mm)
  - Coupled: 11 ft 1 7/8 in (3,400 mm)
- Length
  - Over couplers: 33 ft 6 1/2 in (10,224 mm)
- Height: 12 ft 4 11/32 in (3,768 mm)
- Frame type: Plate
- Axle load: 9.98 LT (10,140 kg)
  - Coupled: 9.98 LT (10,140 kg)
  - Trailing: 9 LT 12 cwt (9,754 kg)
- Adhesive weight: 29.94 LT (30,420 kg)
- Loco weight: 39.54 LT (40,170 kg)
- Fuel type: Coal
- Fuel capacity: 2 LT 12 cwt (2.6 t)
- Water cap.: 1,525 imp gal (6,930 L)
- Firebox
  - Type: Round-top
  - Grate area: 16.4 sq ft (1.52 m^{2})
- Boiler
  - Pitch: 5 ft 9 9/32 in (1,760 mm)
  - Diameter: 3 ft 9 9/32 in (1,150 mm)
  - Tube plates: 12 ft 8 3/4 in (3,880 mm)
  - Small tubes: 144: 1 25/32 in (45 mm)
- Boiler pressure: 160 psi (1,103 kPa)
- Heating surface
  - Firebox: 101.2 sq ft (9.40 m^{2})
  - Tubes: 845 sq ft (78.5 m^{2})
  - Total surface: 946.2 sq ft (87.90 m^{2})
- Cylinders: Two
- Cylinder size: 16 15/16 in (430 mm) bore 24 13/16 in (630 mm) stroke
- Valve gear: Heusinger
- Valve type: Murdoch's D slide
- Couplers: Johnston link-and-pin
Performance figures
- Tractive effort: 16,707 lbf (74.32 kN) @ 75%
Career
- Operators: NZASM; Selati Railway; Imperial Military Railways; Central South African Railways
- Class: NZASM 40 Tonner; CSAR Class A
- Number in class: 20
- Numbers: NZASM 41-60, CSAR 1-19
- Official name: 40 Tonner
- Delivered: 1892–1893
- First run: 1892

The NZASM 40 Tonner 0-6-2T of 1892 was a South African steam locomotive from the pre-Union era in Transvaal.

In 1892 and 1893, the Nederlandsche-Zuid-Afrikaansche Spoorweg-Maatschappij (NZASM) of the Zuid-Afrikaansche Republiek (Transvaal Republic) placed twenty 0-6-2T locomotives in mainline service. Since the railway classified its locomotives according to their weight, these locomotives were known as the 40 Tonners.

== Manufacturer ==
Although the completion of the line from Delagoa Bay to Pretoria was still more than three years in the future, a requirement for larger and heavier mainline locomotives was identified in 1891. The Nederlandsche-Zuid-Afrikaansche Spoorweg-Maatschappij (NZASM) therefore ordered ten 0-6-2T tank locomotives from Emil Kessler's Maschinenfabrik Esslingen. A second order for another ten followed later in 1891.

The first batch of locomotives were delivered in 1892, numbered in the range from 41 to 50. Of the second batch, numbered in the range from 51 to 60, the last seven were built in 1892. Since the NZASM classified its locomotives according to their weight, these locomotives were known as the 40 Tonners. In addition to being numbered, they were all named as well, with the names and numbers cast in brass and mounted on their tank sides.

== Characteristics ==
The locomotive used Murdoch's D unbalanced slide valves, arranged horizontally above the cylinders outside the plate frames and actuated by Heusinger valve gear. These valves caused considerable wear on motion pins and were later replaced by Trick ported balanced slide valves.

The boiler barrel was built up in three rings, arranged telescopically, with the smallest diameter at the firebox end. The rings were lap-jointed and double riveted on longitudinal seams. These boilers had a long life and required little expense in repairs. Five cross-stays were fitted in the steam space above the firebox. The safety valves were arranged above the firebox inside the cab, while a steam escape pipe was fitted above the valves and passed through the roof.

The exhaust had an Adams' Vortex pattern annular nozzle. While this presented additional surface to the blast, the annular orifice had a tendency to become clogged, which increased back pressure, and the exhaust pipes therefore frequently had to be taken out for cleaning. As delivered, the locomotive had 5 inches (127 millimetres) thick wooden buffer beams which were later replaced by 1 inch (25 millimetres) thick steel plates.

The distance between the locomotive's tyres, i.e. between the wheel flanges on the axle, was 3 feet 3 3/8 inches (1,000 millimetres). This was 3/8 inch (10 millimetres) greater than for engines of the Cape Government Railways and Natal Government Railways and, although the flanges were somewhat thinner, the resulting tightness to gauge was blamed for the rather high rate of flange wear. To obtain greater life from the leading coupled wheels, they were occasionally exchanged with the trailing coupled wheels during overhauls.

The original coupled axles were 5 1/4 inches (133 millimetres) in diameter and were inclined to fracture. This was remedied by increasing the diameter to 5 3/4 inches (146 millimetres) on new axles. The trailing wheels also proved to be troublesome. The trailing wheels and axle were of the radial type and were attached directly to the frame, which gave the locomotive a rigid wheelbase. The problem arose as a result of insufficient sideward freedom of movement of the trailing axle when the locomotive traversed sharp curves and diverging points.

== Service ==
=== NZASM ===
The 40 Tonners were found to be satisfactory in service, but the absence of leading carrying wheels resulted in a rough ride.

=== Selati Railway ===
In June 1890, Eugene, the younger of the Barons Oppenheim, sought to obtain a concession from the Government of the Zuid-Afrikaansche Republiek to construct a railway line to the Murchison Range goldfields along the Selati River. Work on the construction of the Selati Railway in the Transvaal Lowveld began early in 1893, with the line branching off from the Pretoria-Delagoa Bay mainline at a junction near Komatipoort. The two locomotives Durban and Pietermaritzburg were purchased from the Natal Government Railways for use during construction, as well as two 40 Tonners which were acquired from the NZASM.

The project was abandoned in 1894, due to financial difficulties as well as a dispute which arose with the NZASM over the chosen route. Work on the railway was only resumed and completed by the Central South African Railways (CSAR) in 1909. The line was then extended via Gravelotte and Tzaneen to a junction at Soekmekaar, where it met the line from Pietersburg to Messina in 1912. In 1963, the part of the line through the southern part of the Kruger National Park, from the junction near Komatipoort, was abandoned and replaced by a new line from the present junction near Kaapmuiden.

=== Imperial Military Railways ===
In 1899, during the Second Boer War, all railway operations in the two Boer Republics, the ZAR and the Orange Free State, were taken over by the Imperial Military Railways (IMR). Nineteen of the 40 Tonners survived the war.

=== Central South African Railways ===
At the end of the war, when the IMR was transformed into the CSAR, the nineteen surviving 40 Tonners were designated Class A and renumbered in the range from 1 to 19. None survived in railway service to be taken onto the South African Railways roster in 1912.

== Works numbers ==
The 40 Tonner engine numbers, names, works numbers and years built are listed in the table.

NZASM 40 Tonner 0-6-2T
NZASM no.	Name	Works no.	Year built
41	Voortrekker	1891	2436
42	President Kruger	1891	2437
43	Generaal Joubert	1891	2438
44	Dr. Leyds	1891	2439
45	Generaal Smit	1891	2440
46	W. Eduard Bok	1891	2441
47	Wolmarans	1891	2442
48	Kloppers	1891	2443
49	Taljaard	1891	2444
50	S.W. Burger	1891	2445
51	Van der Merwe	1891	2480
52	Vorster	1891	2481
53	Coetzee	1891	2482
54	Lombard	1892	2483
55	Van Riebeeck	1892	2484
56	Piet Retief	1892	2485
57	Pretorius	1892	2486
58	Potgieter	1892	2487
59	J. Groll	1892	2488
60	D. Maarschalk	1892	2489

== Illustration ==
The main picture shows no. 50, the S.W. Burger, on a mixed train at Komatipoort. The picture of the same engine below offers a side view of the 40 Tonner locomotive.

The second picture below offers an overhead view of a 40 Tonner, either no. 55 Van Riebeeck or no. 57 Pretorius, after the Braamfontein disaster of 1896. One of the worst explosions in the history of South Africa occurred at Braamfontein station, Johannesburg, on 19 February 1896. An explosives train carrying between 56 and 60 tons of dynamite, which had been standing in searing heat for 3½ days, was struck by a shunting train and exploded. The blast left a crater 60 metres (197 feet) long, 50 metres (164 feet) wide and 8 metres (26 feet) deep and was heard in Klerksdorp, 200 kilometres (124 miles) away. The exact number of casualties was never ascertained, but at least 62 people were killed and more than 200 seriously injured. Surrounding suburbs as far as Fordsburg were partially destroyed. Some 3,000 people lost their homes and almost every window in the town was shattered.

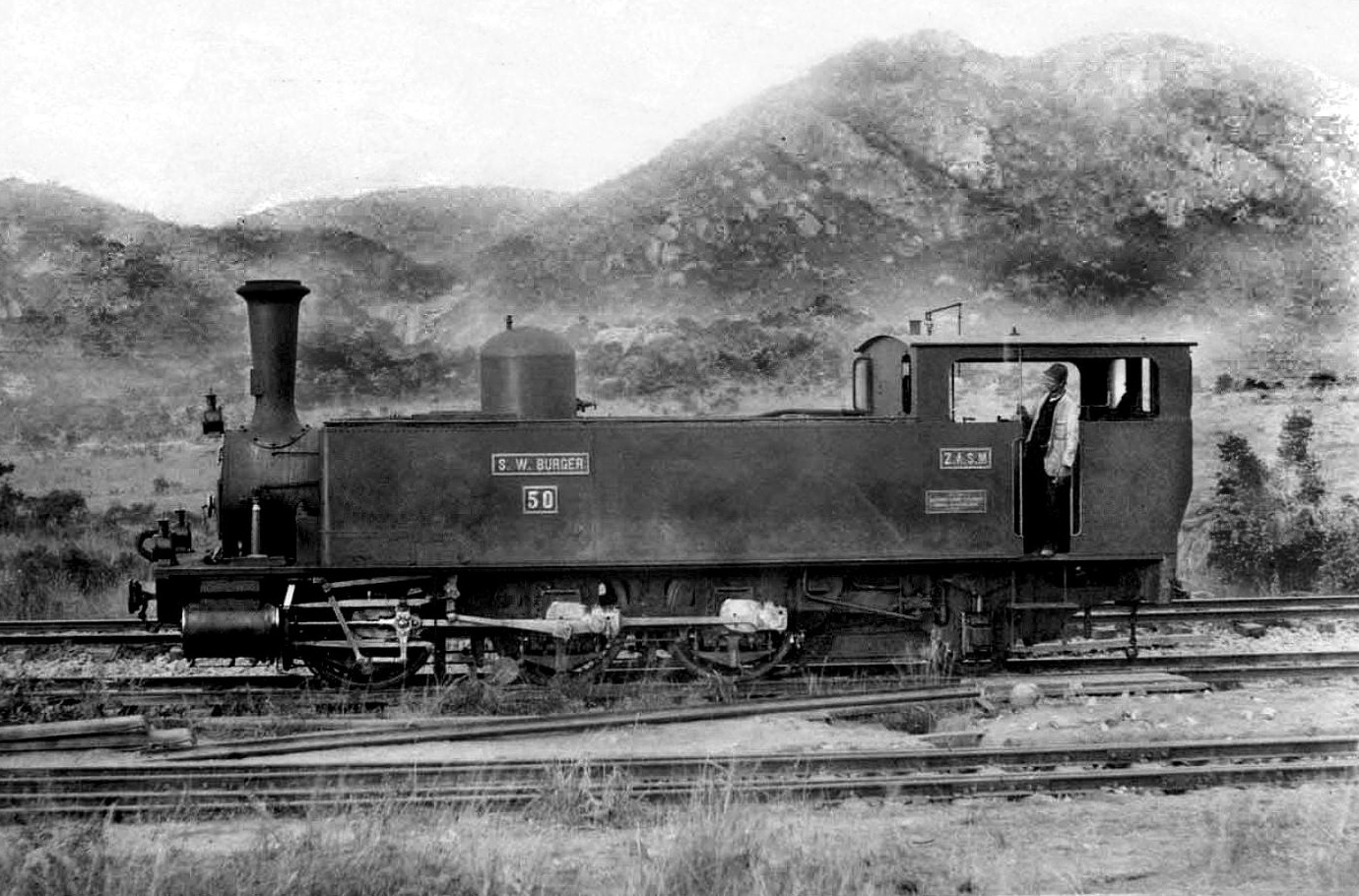
No. 50 S.W. Burger, c. 1895

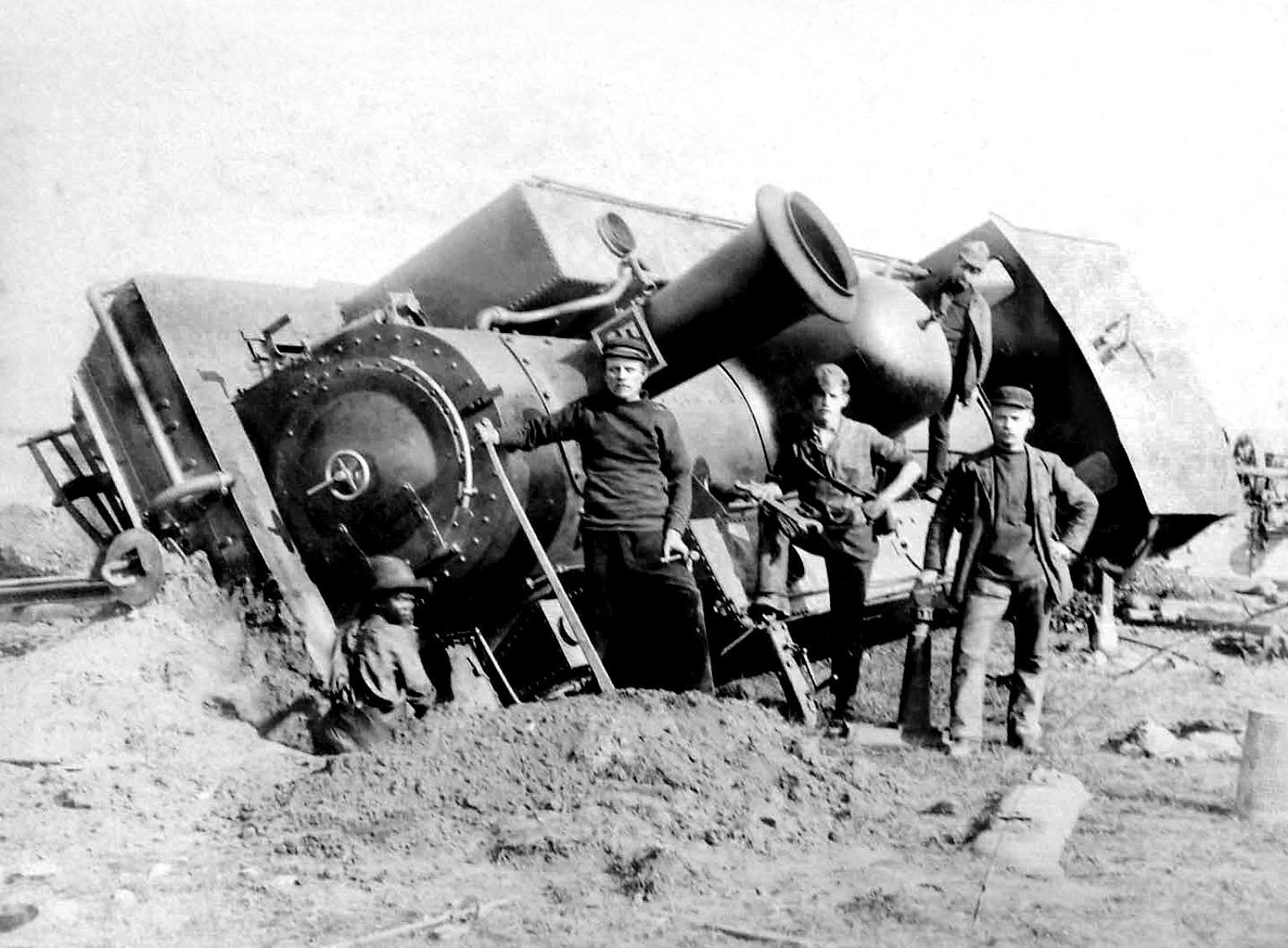
40 Tonner being recovered at Braamfontein, 20 February 1896
