= South African and International Exhibition =

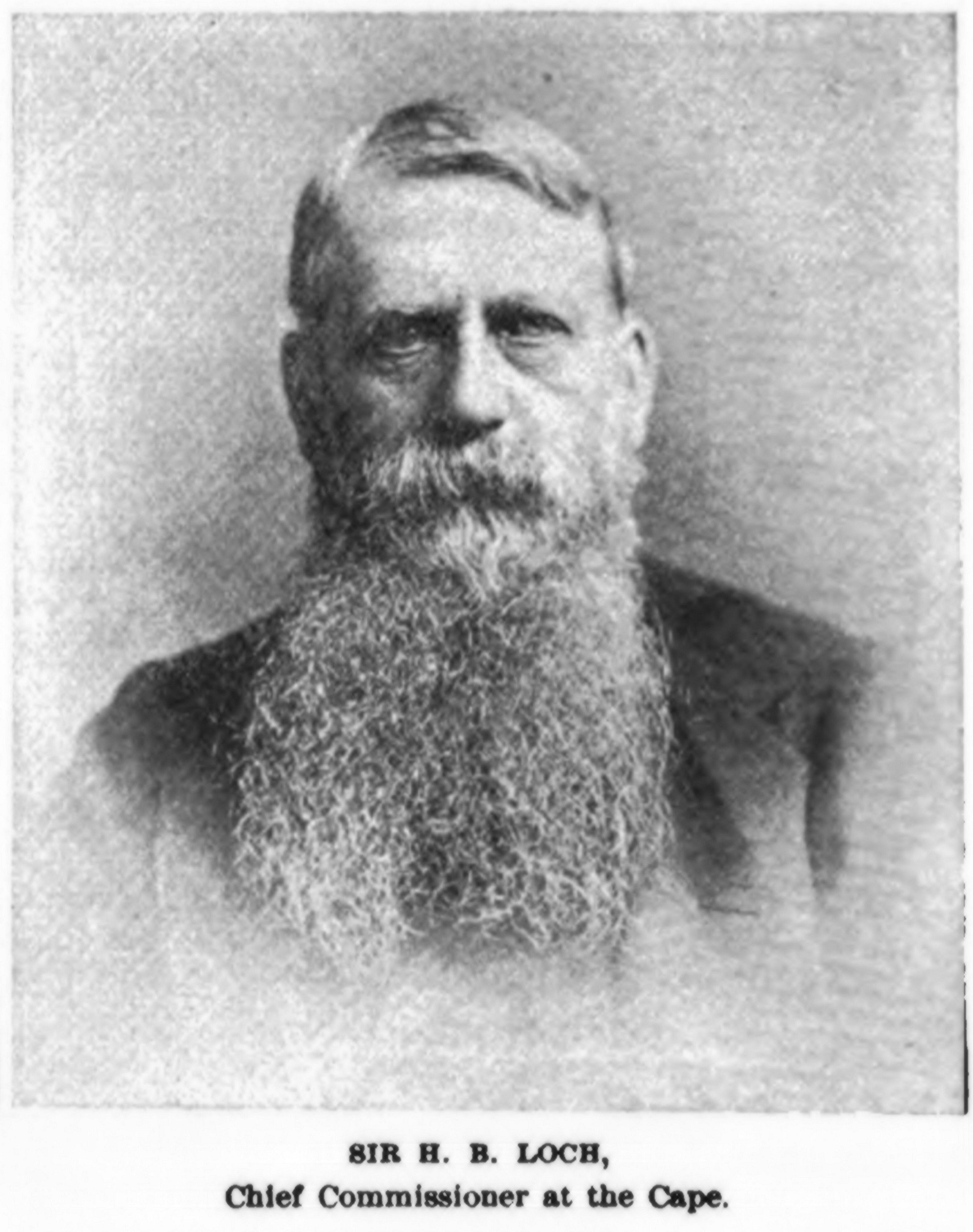
- Henry Loch, High Commissioner for Southern Africa who opened the exhibition

Overview
- BIE-class: Unrecognized exposition
- Name: South African and International Exhibition
- Area: 30 acres (12 ha)
- Visitors: 400 000

Location
- Country: Cape Colony
- City: Kimberley
- Venue: Public Gardens
- Coordinates: 28.7427111111°S 24.7767583333°E

Timeline
- Opening: 8 September 1892
- Closure: 10 January 1893

The South African and International Exhibition was a world's fair held in Kimberley, Cape Colony in 1892 to promote trade and labour.

== The exhibition ==
The exhibition was opened by Henry Loch, High Commissioner for Southern Africa on 8 September 1892 and closed 20 January 1893.

Cecil Rhodes, Prime Minister of Cape Colony, decided that the exhibition should be held in Kimberley. It was held in the Public Gardens of Kimberley (now Queen's Park) on a 30-acre site, with corrugated iron buildings designed D. W. Greatbatch.

There were art displays including paintings from the Royal Collection, mineral displays of diamonds, coal, crocidolite, diamonds, gold and silver, mining machinery, and sheep shearing equipment.

400 000 people attended, and the fair lost £14,195, with the loss being covered by Rhodes.

== Legacy ==
The De Beers exhibit was taken to be displayed at the 1893 Chicago exhibition. The art hall was converted to be used by the Kimberley Rifles, and subsequently used as a typhoid hospital during the Boer war.
