= 1828 in South Africa =

- Decades: 1800s; 1810s; 1820s; 1830s; 1840s
- See also: List of years in South Africa

The following lists events that happened during 1828 in South Africa.

== Events ==
- Colonial forces, AmaXhosa, AmaThembu, and white soldiers defeat the AmaNgwane chief Matiwane, at the Battle of Mbholompo. He flees to Zululand, where Dingane executes him.
- Dingane assassinates Shaka and succeeds him as AmaZulu leader.
- Cape Colony's Ordinance 50 ensures legal equality, limits employer power, exempts Coloureds from carrying passes, and revises apprenticeship laws.
- Cape Colony magistrates lose the power to administer corporal punishment, and freedom of the press is recognized.
- Griqua leader Cornelius Kok II dies, and Adam Kok II regains leadership.

== Births ==
- 9 May – Andrew Murray, author, educationist and pastor, is born in Cape Town

== Deaths ==
- 22 September – Shaka is murdered by his half brother, Dingaan who then becomes king of the Zulus
