= 1822 in South Africa =

- Decades: 1800s; 1810s; 1820s; 1830s; 1840s
- See also: List of years in South Africa

The following lists events that happened during 1822 in South Africa.

== Events ==
- Large group of Griqua join Koranna, form "Bergenaars," and begin to raid cattle and attack communities along the Orange & Vaal Rivers.
- London Missionary Society, led by Dr. Philip, establishes a mission station for the San at Philippolis.
- AmaNgwane cross the Drakensberg into the Caledon River valley.
- AmaMfengu refugees of the Difaqane settle in the Eastern Cape.
