= 1826 in South Africa =

- Decades: 1800s; 1810s; 1820s; 1830s; 1840s
- See also: List of years in South Africa

The following lists events that happened during 1826 in South Africa.

== Events ==
- Cape colonial government approves election of Adam Kok II. He resigns months later due to internal strife and is succeeded by Cornelius Kok II.
- Cape Colony passes legislation to reform the justice system, instituting the Cape Charter of Justice and introducing trial by jury.
- Cape Parliament passes Ordinance 19, establishing a Guardian of Slaves to oversee punishment and allow slaves to file complaints. Ordinance 19 allows slaves' freedom to be purchased by family members.
- Slave owners protest against Ordinance 19.
