= 1820 in South Africa =

- Decades: 1800s; 1810s; 1820s; 1830s; 1840s
- See also: List of years in South Africa

The following lists events that happened during 1820 in South Africa.

== Events ==
- James Read produces the first SeTswana book.
- Adam Kok II and followers leave Griquatown for Riet River, leaving Griqua without a leader.
- Andries Waterboer is elected the Griqua captain at Griquatown.
- 5,000 British settlers arrive in Algoa Bay, are allocated land in Zuurveld, and then expected to act as a civilian defense force.
- Port Elizabeth is named by Sir Rufane Donkin.
- The settlement of Worcester is established.
- AmaMfengu refugees flee to the Eastern Cape.
- King Moshoeshoe moves the Basotho capital to Butha Buthe Mountain to escape conflict.
- 17 March - The first British settlers arrive in Table Bay, Cape Town on the "Nautilus" and the "Chapman".

== Births ==
- Sandile kaNgqika, a Xhosa nation (Rarabe) chief born in the Ciskei region
