= 1825 in South Africa =

- Decades: 1800s; 1810s; 1820s; 1830s; 1840s
- See also: List of years in South Africa

The following lists events that happened during 1825 in South Africa.

== Events ==
- Slave and Khoikhoi uprising in Worcester district over rights.
- Colonial frontier extended to the Orange River.
- Rix dollar converted to British currency.
- Adam Kok II elected Kaptyn of Griquas and "Bergenaars".

== Births ==
- 17 September - Donald Currie, shipping magnate and donor of the Currie Cups for rugby union and cricket, is born in Greenock, Scotland
- 10 October - Future South African president Stephanus Johannes Paul Kruger is born in Cradock, Cape Colony

== Deaths ==
- 31 January - Petrus Johannes Truter (77), explorer and official in the East India Company, dies in Swellendam
