= List of years in South Africa =

History of South Africa

←	First VOC settlement

←	First Boer War

←	Second Boer War

←	Great Trek

←	Bartholomew Diaz anchors at Mosselbay

←	Vasco da Gama anchors at Durban

←	Sir Francis Drake rounds the Cape

←	First wine pressed from Cape grapes

←	Battle of Blood River

←	Battle of Isandlwana

←	Anglo-Zulu wars start

←	Anglo-Zulu wars end

←	Start of Apartheid

←	End of Apartheid

Pre-Dutch Colonisation
Dutch Colonisation
British Colonisation
Union of South Africa
Republic of South Africa
Apartheid

This is a list of years in South Africa.

== Before Dutch and British colonisation ==
- BCE in Southern Africa
- Early CE in Southern Africa
- 13th century
- 14th century

== Dutch and later British colonisation ==
- 15th century
- 16th century
  - 1600s
  - 1610s
  - 1620s
  - 1630s
  - 1640s
  - 1650s
  - 1660s
  - 1670s
  - 1680s
  - 1690s
  - 1700s
  - 1710s
  - 1720s
  - 1730s
  - 1740s
  - 1750s
  - 1760s
  - 1770s
  - 1780s
  - 1790s
  - 1800s: 1800
  - 1801
  - 1802
  - 1803
  - 1804
  - 1805
  - 1806
  - 1807
  - 1808
  - 1809
  - 1810s: 1810
  - 1811
  - 1812
  - 1813
  - 1814
  - 1815
  - 1816
  - 1817
  - 1818
  - 1819
  - 1820s: 1820
  - 1821
  - 1822
  - 1823
  - 1824
  - 1825
  - 1826
  - 1827
  - 1828
  - 1829
  - 1830s: 1830
  - 1831
  - 1832
  - 1833
  - 1834
  - 1835
  - 1836
  - 1837
  - 1838
  - 1839
  - 1840s: 1840
  - 1841
  - 1842
  - 1843
  - 1844
  - 1845
  - 1846
  - 1847
  - 1848
  - 1849
  - 1850s: 1850
  - 1851
  - 1852
  - 1853
  - 1854
  - 1855
  - 1856
  - 1857
  - 1858
  - 1859
  - 1860s: 1860
  - 1861
  - 1862
  - 1863
  - 1864
  - 1865
  - 1866
  - 1867
  - 1868
  - 1869
  - 1870s: 1870
  - 1871
  - 1872
  - 1873
  - 1874
  - 1875
  - 1876
  - 1877
  - 1878
  - 1879
  - 1880s: 1880
  - 1881
  - 1882
  - 1883
  - 1884
  - 1885
  - 1886
  - 1887
  - 1888
  - 1889
  - 1890s: 1890
  - 1891
  - 1892
  - 1893
  - 1894
  - 1895
  - 1896
  - 1897
  - 1898
  - 1899
  - 1900s: 1900
  - 1901
  - 1902
  - 1903
  - 1904
  - 1905
  - 1906
  - 1907
  - 1908
  - 1909

== Union of South Africa ==
  - 1910s: 1910
  - 1911
  - 1912
  - 1913
  - 1914
  - 1915
  - 1916
  - 1917
  - 1918
  - 1919
  - 1920s: 1920
  - 1921
  - 1922
  - 1923
  - 1924
  - 1925
  - 1926
  - 1927
  - 1928
  - 1929
  - 1930s: 1930
  - 1931
  - 1932
  - 1933
  - 1934
  - 1935
  - 1936
  - 1937
  - 1938
  - 1939
  - 1940s: 1940
  - 1941
  - 1942
  - 1943
  - 1944
  - 1945
  - 1946
  - 1947
  - 1948
  - 1949
  - 1950s: 1950
  - 1951
  - 1952
  - 1953
  - 1954
  - 1955
  - 1956
  - 1957
  - 1958
  - 1959
  - 1960s: 1960

== Republic of South Africa ==
  - 1960s: 1961
  - 1962
  - 1963
  - 1964
  - 1965
  - 1966
  - 1967
  - 1968
  - 1969
  - 1970s: 1970
  - 1971
  - 1972
  - 1973
  - 1974
  - 1975
  - 1976
  - 1977
  - 1978
  - 1979
  - 1980s: 1980
  - 1981
  - 1982
  - 1983
  - 1984
  - 1985
  - 1986
  - 1987
  - 1988
  - 1989
  - 1990s: 1990
  - 1991
  - 1992
  - 1993

== Post Apartheid ==
  - 1990s: 1994
  - 1995
  - 1996
  - 1997
  - 1998
  - 1999
  - 2000s: 2000
  - 2001
  - 2002
  - 2003
  - 2004
  - 2005
  - 2006
  - 2007
  - 2008
  - 2009
  - 2010s: 2010
  - 2011
  - 2012
  - 2013
  - 2014
  - 2015
  - 2016
  - 2017
  - 2018
  - 2019
  - 2020s: 2020
  - 2021
  - 2022
  - 2023
  - 2024
  - 2025

== See also ==
- Timelines of cities in South Africa: Cape Town, Durban, Johannesburg, Port Elizabeth, Pretoria

== Bibliography ==
- Historical dictionary of South Africa, Christopher Saunders, Nicholas Southey' 2nd Edition, Lanham, Md., London: Scarecrow Press
- Manual of South African Geography: Forming a Companion to the Map of South Africa to 16° South Latitude.

=== published in 20th century ===
pre-1990s

- W. H. Hosking (1914). "Chronology of South Africa". South African Year-book. London: George Routledge and Sons. pp. 10–27.
- Standard Encyclopaedia of Southern Africa, DJ Potgieter, Cape Town: NASOU, 1970
- Five Hundred years: a history of South Africa, CFJ Muller, 3rd rev., Pretoria Academica, 1981
- Reader's Digest Illustrated Guide to Southern Africa 5th Edition ISBN 0-947008-17-9, 1985
- Who did what in South Africa, Mona De Beer, Craighall, South Africa, AD Donker, 1988

1990s

- Institut für Afrika-Kunde; Rolf Hofmeier, eds. (1990). "Südliches Afrika". Afrika Jahrbuch 1989 (in German). Germany: Leske + Budrich. doi:10.1007/978-3-322-92639-5. ISBN 978-3-8100-0831-2. OCLC 19093344. "Politik, Wirtschaft und Gesellschaft in Afrika südlich der Sahara"
- Who's who in South African politics, Shelagh Gastrow, 3rd Edition, Johannesburg, Ravan Press, 1990
- Who's who in South African politics, Shelagh Gastrow, 4th Edition, Johannesburg, Ravan Press, 1992
- New dictionary of South African biography, edited by E.J. Verwey, Pretoria: HSRC Publishers, 1995
- ANC's Statement to the Truth and Reconciliation Commission, 1996
- Africa Confidential who's who of Southern Africa, edited by Patrick Smith, Oxford, Malden, MA: Blackwell, 1998
- A-Z of South African Politics: the Essential Handbook, 1999, edited by Phillip Van Niekerk and Barbara Ludman, London, NY: Penguin Books
- Jacqueline Audrey Kalley; et al., eds. (1999). Southern African Political History: A Chronology of Key Political Events from Independence to Mid-1997. Greenwood. ISBN 978-0-313-30247-3.
- Nuusdagboek: feite en fratse oor 1000 jaar, F Wallis, Kaapstad: Human & Rousseau, 2000

=== published in 21st century ===
- "South Africa". Political Chronology of Africa. Political Chronologies of the World. Europa Publications. 2001. p. 389+. ISBN 0203409957.
- Ineke van Kessel [in Dutch] (2008). "South Africa". In Andreas Mehler; et al. (eds.). Africa Yearbook: Politics, Economy and Society South of the Sahara in 2007. Vol. 4. Koninklijke Brill. pp. 487+. ISBN 978-9004168053. ISSN 1871-2525.
- Sanusha Naidu (2013). "South Africa". In Andreas Mehler; et al. (eds.). Africa Yearbook: Politics, Economy and Society South of the Sahara in 2012. Vol. 9. Koninklijke Brill. p. 507+. ISBN 9789004256002. ISSN 1871-2525.
