= 1836 in South Africa =

- Decades: 1810s; 1820s; 1830s; 1840s; 1850s
- See also: List of years in South Africa

The following lists events that happened during 1836 in South Africa.

== Events ==
- The Cape Colony's Legislative Council provides for elected municipal councils.
- Cape of Good Hope Punishment Act is passed to control trekboer and Voortrekker movements.
- Lt. Gov. Andries Stockenström restores the province of Queen Adelaide to the AmaXhosa under British orders. His treaty system recognizing AmaXhosa chiefs' authority causes tension with Gov. Sir Benjamin D'Urban.
- AmaNdebele under King Mzilikatsi challenge the Voortrekkers. At Vegkop, Hendrick Potgieter's forces win but suffer heavy losses.
- Andries Potgieter and Pieter Uys, with Griqua, Barolong, Koranna, and BaTlokwa allies, seize Mosega, forcing Mzilikatsi to flee north to Marico Valley.

== Births ==
- 4 October - Pieter Arnoldus Cronjé, Boer General, is born near Colesberg, Cape Colony
