= 1834 in South Africa =

- Decades: 1810s; 1820s; 1830s; 1840s; 1850s
- See also: List of years in South Africa

The following lists events that happened during 1834 in South Africa.

== Events ==
- Cape officially emancipates all of the estimated 59,000 slaves in the colony.
- New Governor Sir Benjamin D'Urban establishes Executive and Legislative Councils. No elections, but debates are allowed, and laws require Council approval.
- Secret preparations for the Great Trek begin as armed Boer farmers plan to leave Cape Colony.

== Births ==
- 20 January - Petrus Jacobus Joubert, a South African Republic Triumvirate member, is born near Cango in the Oudtshoorn district of Cape Colony
- 15 April - Thomas François Burgers, the 4th state president of the South African Republic, is born on Langefontein farm in the Camdeboo district of Graaff-Reinet, Cape Colony
