= 1839 in South Africa =

- Decades: 1810s; 1820s; 1830s; 1840s; 1850s
- See also: List of years in South Africa

The following lists events that happened during 1839 in South Africa.

== Events ==
- Henry Jervis is elected the Military Administrator of Port Natal
- Johannes Stephanus Maritz is voted Natalia Republic's chairperson of the Raad
- Johannes Stephanus Maritz is voted Natalia Republic's chairperson of the Raad for the second time
- The Cape Colony relinquishes Port Natal, and it is incorporated into the Natalia Republic.
- The town of Pietermaritzburg is founded. It is named after the Voortrekker leaders Gert Maritz and Piet Retief.

== Births ==
- 7 December - Redvers Henry Buller in at Crediton, Devonshire
- John Robinson, the first Prime minister of Natal (1893 - 1897) is born

== Deaths ==
- Barend Barends, Kaptyn of Griqualand West, dies
- Du Pré Alexander, Earl of Caledon and Governor of the Cape Colony, dies
- Sir John Francis Cradock, Governor of the Cape, dies
