= 1824 in South Africa =

- Decades: 1800s; 1810s; 1820s; 1830s; 1840s
- See also: List of years in South Africa

The following lists events that happened during 1824 in South Africa.

== Events ==
- AmaTlokwa besiege Basotho; they flee Butha Buthe and found Thaba Bosiu.
- Shaka grants land to British traders Farewell & Fynn, who exploit it for illicit trade.
- Traders falsely portray Shaka as a "barbaric despot" to push for British annexation.
- Cape traders settle at Port Natal.
- The Dutch Reformed Church holds its first synod.
- South Africa's first lighthouse is built at Green Point, Cape Town.
