= Cornelius Kok II =

Leader of the Griqua people

Leader of the Griqua people
- In office 1820–1857
- Preceded by: Cornelius Kok I
- Succeeded by: Adam Kok III

Personal details
- Born: c. 1778 Kamiesberg
- Died: 1858 Campbell

Corneli(u)s Kok II (c. 1778 in Kamiesberg – 1858 in Campbell) was a leader ("captain") of the Griqua people in southern Africa.

== Biography ==
Kok was the son of captain Cornelius Kok I. He settled with his father in Griquatown and later in Campbell. After his father's death in 1820, Kok served as captain of Campbell until his older brother Adam Kok II returned from Griquatown. However, when Adam Kok II resigned as captain to join the Bergenaars, Cornelius Kok II resumed the title of captain again.

In 1823, Cornelius Kok II, Adam Kok II, Andries Waterboer and Barend Barends won the Battle of Dithakong, as a result of which the Griqua were spared the terror of the Mfecane. The following year Cornelius Kok came into conflict with his brother and the Bergenaars, whom he defeated together with Waterboer near Fauresmith. However Kok's followers sided with the Bergenaars. To retain his leadership, he broke his ties with Waterboer, which then led to a new territorial conflict. Adam Kok II acted as a go-between, and a border was fixed between Waterboer's Griquatown and Cornelius Kok's Campbell.

After the death of Adam Kok II, a succession battle arose between his sons: Abraham Kok, supported by Cornelius Kok II, and his nephew, Adam Kok III, who was supported by Waterboer. The petty civil war was won by Adam Kok III and Cornelius Kok II was deposed as captain, but in practice little changed. Andries Waterboer died in 1852, but his son Nicolaas Waterboer continued the territorial conflicts with Kok.

In 1857, with the support of his followers, the old and sick Kok handed his territory over to Adam Kok III. He died early in 1858 in Campbell.
