= 1837 in South Africa =

- Decades: 1810s; 1820s; 1830s; 1840s; 1850s
- See also: List of years in South Africa

The following lists events that happened during 1837 in South Africa.

== Events ==
- Potgieter and Uys attack Mzilikazi, driving him and the AmaNdebele beyond the Limpopo into present-day Zimbabwe.
- Voortrekker leader Piet Retief publishes his Manifesto which sets out the reasons the Voortrekkers are leaving the Cape Colony.
- Piet Retief and his followers leave the Cape Colony.
- Piet Retief orders Erasmus Smit to be ordained as a minister of the Voortrekkers, but meets with opposition because they consider him as being too old and sickly at 59.
- The voortrekkers under the leadership of Piet Retief arrived in Natal over the Drakensberg mountains after trekking overland from the Cape Colony during the Great Trek.
- Retief negotiates land with Zulu chief Dingane, offering cattle and rifles. The cattle is delivered, and the rifles withheld, causing Dingane to order Retief's execution.
- The Voortrekker Republic of Natalia begins to be established.
