= 1833 in South Africa =

- Decades: 1810s; 1820s; 1830s; 1840s; 1850s
- See also: List of years in South Africa

The following lists events that happened during 1833 in South Africa.

== Events ==
- David Hume, explorer and big-game hunter, becomes the first European to enter the country of the Bamangwato (Botswana).
- All slaves were emancipated in the British Empire.
- Basotho kingdom under King Moshoeshoe repels attacks from mounted "Bergenaars" using horses and firearms, maintaining sovereignty.
- Moshoeshoe invites Paris Evangelical Missionary Society missionaries to help modernize the state, and they establish villages along the frontier to reinforce authority.
- British Parliament passes the Abolition Act, ending slavery but introducing "apprenticeship" to prevent economic collapse.
