= 1821 in South Africa =

- Decades: 1800s; 1810s; 1820s; 1830s; 1840s
- See also: List of years in South Africa

The following lists events that happened during 1821 in South Africa.

== Events ==
- The London Missionary Society mission station at Kuruman, Northern Cape is started by Robert Moffat
