= 1835 in South Africa =

- Decades: 1810s; 1820s; 1830s; 1840s; 1850s
- See also: List of years in South Africa

The following lists events that happened during 1835 in South Africa.

== Events ==
- The Voortrekkers start leaving the Cape Colony in what is called the Great Trek into the interior to escape British domination
- Port Natal is renamed Durban in honor of the Cape Colony Governor, Sir Benjamin d'Urban
- AmaXhosa chiefdoms invade the Cape Colony to reclaim land taken in the previous Sixth War of Dispossession.
- Governor Sir Benjamin D'Urban orders Cape troops and African allies to devastate AmaXhosa villages, crops, and food supplies.
- D'Urban annexes land between the Kei and Keiskamma rivers, naming it the province of Adelaide.
- Missionaries publish the first IsiXhosa grammar in Grahamstown.
- Cape Colony's Ordinance 1 forbids slave owners from administering punishment and a judicial/magisterial system is introduced for legal enforcement.
- Chief Hintsa of the AmaXhosa is captured under a false truce by Governor D'Urban's troops and interrogated. He was murdered while attempting to escape, with his ears taken as trophies.
