= 1838 in South Africa =

- Decades: 1810s; 1820s; 1830s; 1840s; 1850s
- See also: List of years in South Africa

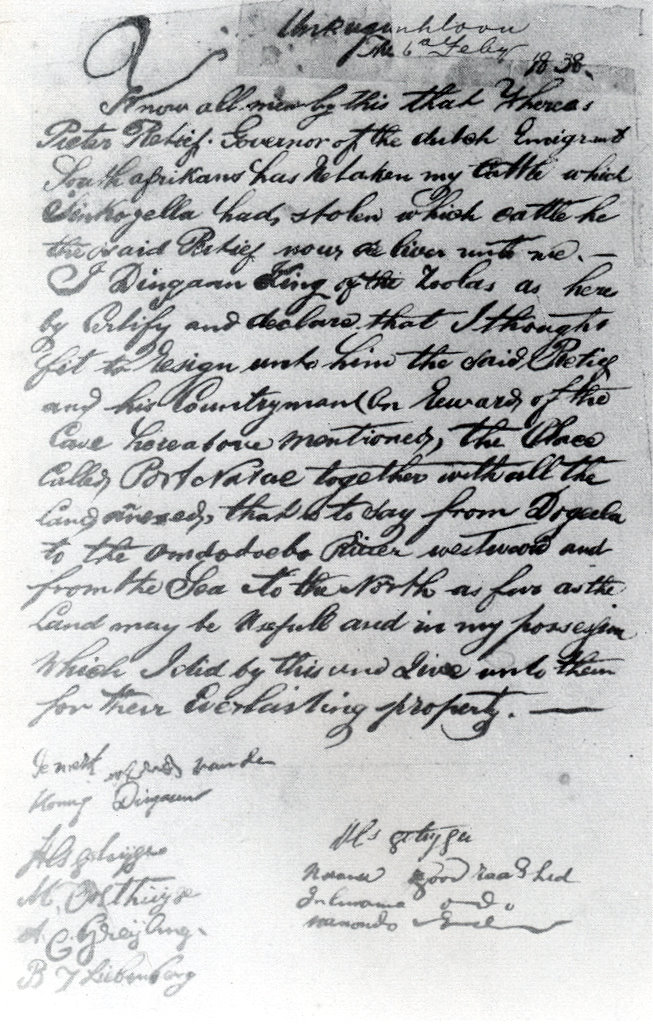
Treaty between Retief and Dingane

The following lists events that happened during 1838 in South Africa.

== Events ==
=== February ===
- 4 February - The AmaZulu King, Dingane signs a deed of cession to cede land to the voortrekkers led by Piet Retief

=== April ===
- 11 April - Battle of Italeni where the AmaZulu repulsed the Voortrekkers close to uMgungundlovu.
- 11 April - Voortrekker leaders Piet Uys and his son Dirkie Uys die in battle at the hands of the Zulus.

=== December ===
- 4 December - Britain occupies Port Natal, denying the Republic of Natalia access to trade routes.
- 16 December - The Battle of Blood River, Voortrekkers under Andries Pretorius defeat the AmaZulu.
- 22 December - Potchefstroom is founded as the Transvaal Republic's capital by Andries Hendrik Potgieter.

=== Unknown ===
- A municipality is formed covering the Green Point-Sea Point areas in Cape Town
- The Voortrekkers establish Natalia Republic with Pietermaritzburg as capital
- Voortrekkers draft a Constitution enforcing White supremacy and a racial master-servant order.
- The Volksraad of 24 elected men is established with legislative, judiciary, and executive powers.
- Voortrekkers defeat the AmaZulu at the Battle of Blood River, killing 3,000 troops.
- Cape slavery ends as the 1834 "apprenticeship" system is abolished.

== Deaths ==
- 6 February - Voortrekker leader Piet Retief and his men are murdered by the Zulus under the command of Dingaan
- 25 October - Voortrekker leader Louis Tregardt (55), died of malaria in Delagoa bay
