= 1831 in South Africa =

- Decades: 1810s; 1820s; 1830s; 1840s; 1850s
- See also: List of years in South Africa

The following lists events that happened during 1831 in South Africa.

== Events ==
- The first issue of Grahamstown Journal is printed

== Births ==
- 5 May – Gezina Susanna Fredricka Wilhelmina du Plessis, who later married South African Republic general and future politician Paul Kruger, and had seven daughters and nine sons with him, is born.
