= 1840 in South Africa =

- Decades: 1820s; 1830s; 1840s; 1850s; 1860s
- See also: List of years in South Africa

The following lists events that happened during 1840 in South Africa.

== Events ==
- The Cape Town Municipality is formed and has a population of 20,016, of which 10,560 are Whites
- 26 March - The town of Wellington is founded in the Cape Colony
- 16 October - Potchefstroom, Winburg and Natalia unifies as a single Boer republic
