= Dutch Reformed Church, Philippolis =

Church in Philippolis, South Africa

Dutch Reformed Church
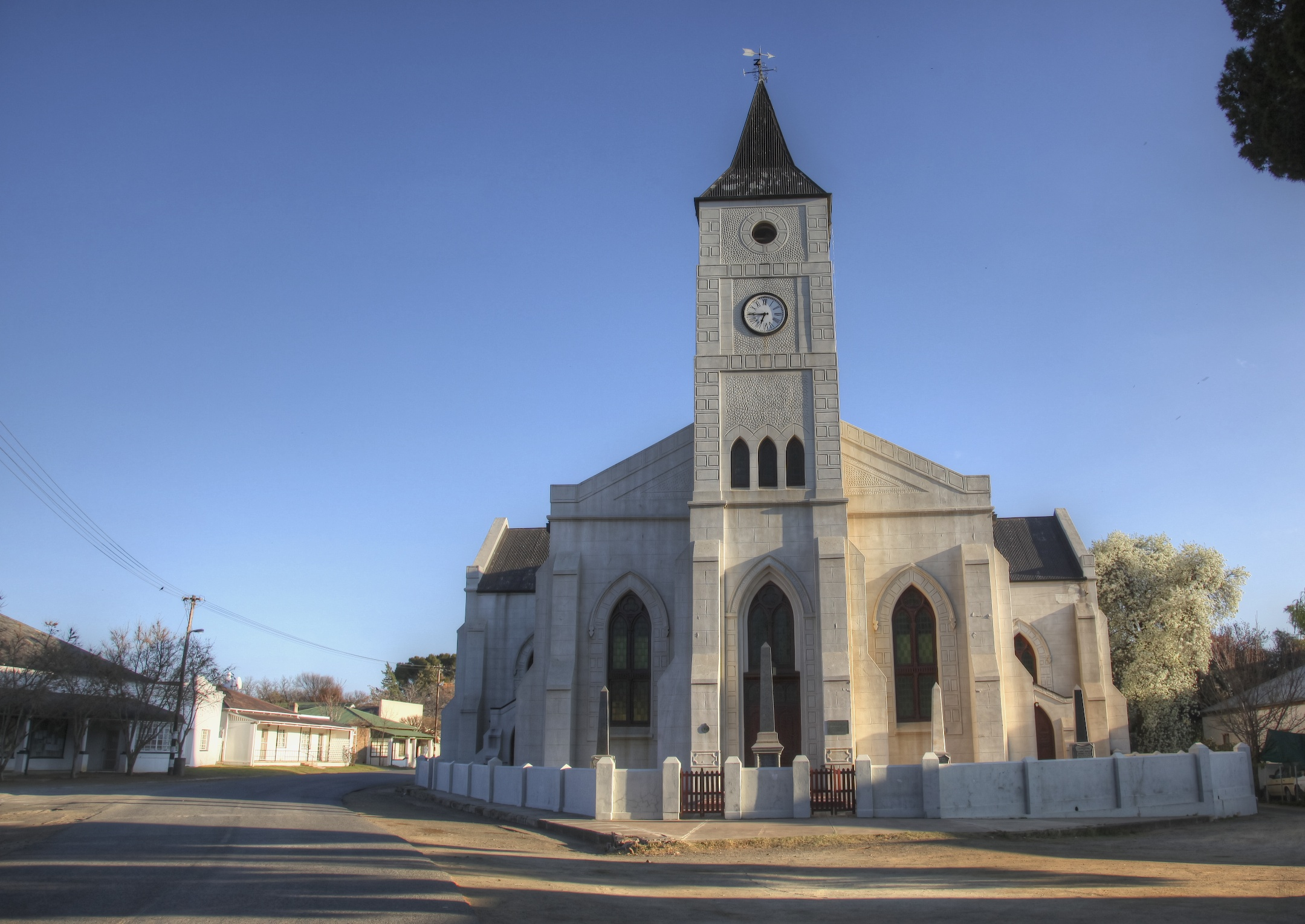
- Location: Philippolis
- Country: South Africa
- Denomination: Nederduits Gereformeerde Kerk

History
- Founded: 1862

Architecture
- Functional status: Church

The Dutch Reformed Church in Philippolis is the ninth oldest congregation in the Free State Synod of the Dutch Reformed Church.

== Background ==
Rev. Andries Adriaan Louw of the NG congregation Fauresmith, under whom Philippolis fell before the congregation's foundation in October 1862, was the pioneer who laid the foundations of the young congregation well and firmly. The first steps of Philippolis as a new congregation were shaky and hesitant. After all the years of disorderly church existence, there was a lack of congregational tradition and cohesion on which to build. After the secession in October 1862 of this ninth church in the Free State, Rev. Louw became the first consultant of the new congregation. It was therefore a vast area that he had to work, but he possessed all the gifts to do spiritual pioneering work in this wide field of labor. He had a powerful personality and a deep humanity. In his dealings he was very affable, to which his witty and witty remarks contributed. His preaching style was unique, captivating: His sermons were one of a kind and left an indelible impression on the mind of every listener, according to J.A. Bosch in Philippolis' Centenary Commemoration Book.

As a consultant of Philippolis, he was a special strength and a source of advice for this congregation in its formative years. Under his able leadership, the young congregation's domestic affairs such as the appointment of a first pastor, the acquisition of a church building and rectory, the election of a first church council, etc. were brought into order. Rev. Louw invariably came to lead the church council meetings and administered the sacraments on the following Sunday. After the arrival of Rev. Colin Fraser Jr., Rev. Louw continued to serve as an advisor and faithful helper until 1867 when he accepted a call to the NG congregation in Murraysburg. After a fruitful ministry of 44 years, he died on 24 June 1908.

== Ministers ==
- Colin Fraser jr., 1863–1907, 44 years (longest tenure)
- S.J. Perold, 1907–1916, 9 years
- Dr. Tobie Muller, 1916–1918, 2 years (deceased)
- P.S.Z. Coetzee, 1920–1925, 5 years
- Christoffel Johannes van Niekerk, 1926 – 12 June 1947, 21 years (deceased in office)
- Daniël Josias Redelinghuys, 1948–1961, 13 years
- Jannie van Heerden, 1962–1966, 4 years
- D.N.J. du Toit, 1967–1968, 18 months (deceased)
- Dr. Ben du Toit, 1969–1972, 3 years
- Phil Olivier, 1973–1976, 3 years
- Tienie Strydom, 1977–1981, 4 years
- Awie van Staden, 1981–1983, 2 years
- Philip Rudolph Botha, 11 May 1984–1988, 4 years
- Gideon Engelbrecht, 1988–1992, 4 years (deceased)
- Ken Lemkuhl, 1993–1994, 2 years
- Bertie Haasbroek, 1995–2003
- Ferdinand Ball
- Dr. Carin van Schalkwyk

== Sources ==
- (in Afrikaans) Bosch, J.A. 1962. Eeufeesgedenkboek van die N.G. gemeente Philippolis, 1862–1962. Philippolis: Eeufeesreëlingskomitee.
- (in Afrikaans) De Kock, W.J. 1968. Suid-Afrikaanse Biografiese Woordeboek, deel I. Kaapstad: Nasionale Boekhandel Beperk.
- (in Dutch) Dreyer, eerw. A. 1924. Eeuwfeest-Album van de Nederduits Gereformeerde-Kerk in Zuid-Afrika 1824–1924. Kaapstad: Publikatie-kommissie van de Z.A. Bijbelvereniging.
- (in Afrikaans) Gaum, Frits (hoofred.) 2008. Christelike Kernensiklopedie. Wellington: Lux Verbi.Bm en Byblekor.
- (in Dutch) Maeder, ds. G.A. en Zinn, Christian. 1917. Ons Kerk Album. Kaapstad: Ons Kerk Album Maatschappij Bpkt.
- (in Afrikaans) Nienaber, P.J. Hier Is Ons Skrywers! Biografiese Sketse van Afrikaanse Skrywers. Johannesburg: Afrikaanse Pers-Boekhandel.
- (in Afrikaans) Oberholster, ds. J.A.S. 1955. Murraysburg honderd jaar oud, 1855–1955. Murraysburg: NG Kerkraad.
- (in English) Potgieter, D.J. (ed.) 1972. Standard Encyclopaedia of Southern Africa. Cape Town: Nasionale Opvoedkundige Uitgewery (Nasou).
- (in Afrikaans) Schoeman, Karel. 1982. Vrystaatse Erfenis. Bouwerk en geboue in die 19de eeu. Kaapstad, Pretoria, Johannesburg: Human & Rousseau.
- (in Afrikaans) Swart, prof. dr. M.J. (voors.). 1980. Afrikaanse Kultuuralmanak. Aucklandpark: Federasie van Afrikaanse Kultuurvereniginge.
