= Southern Africa BC =

- BCE in South Africa
- BCE » Early CE 13th century
- List of years in South Africa

== Events ==
- 186,000 BC - Earliest footprints of humans found in South Africa
- 100,000 BC - Khoikhoi people with cattle and those without living together for thousands of years Khoikhoi (agri-pastoralists)
- 8000 BC - Date of man-made shelters discovered north of current day Johannesburg
