= 1829 in South Africa =

- Decades: 1800s; 1810s; 1820s; 1830s; 1840s
- See also: List of years in South Africa

The following lists events that happened during 1829 in South Africa.

== Events ==
- Fertile land in the Kat River basin granted to 250 Khoikhoi and coloured families, marking the start of the Kat River Settlement as a buffer zone between AmaXhosa and the colonial government.
- Kat River Settlement becomes a self-sufficient farming community, supported by missionaries.
- South African College founded in Cape Town, South Africa; later to separate into the South African College Schools and the University of Cape Town.
- Rharhabe and Gcaleka polities reconcile to unite against colonial aggression.
