= ADs in Southern Africa =

- Early CE in South Africa
- BCE « Early CE » 13th 14th century
- List of years in South Africa

== Events ==
- 300 AD - Early Iron Age communities are established in the northern and eastern regions of Southern Africa
- 500 AD - A group of Bantu-speaking tribes migrating southwards reached present-day KwaZulu-Natal Province
- 696 AD - Arab traders trade along the east coast of the Southern African region
- 1050 - 1270 AD - Kingdom of Mapungubwe
