= 1832 in South Africa =

- Decades: 1810s; 1820s; 1830s; 1840s; 1850s
- See also: List of years in South Africa

The following lists events that happened during 1832 in South Africa.

== Births ==
- 30 September - Frederick Roberts, 1st Earl Roberts, commander of British troops in the Second Boer War, is born in Cawnpore, India
