= 1913 in South Africa =

- Decades: 1890s; 1900s; 1910s; 1920s; 1930s
- See also: List of years in South Africa

The following lists events that happened during 1913 in South Africa.

== Incumbents ==
- Monarch: King George V.
- Governor-General and High Commissioner for Southern Africa: The Viscount Gladstone.
- Prime Minister: Louis Botha.
- Chief Justice: John de Villiers, 1st Baron de Villiers

== Events ==
May

- South Africa's first flying school opens in Kimberley to train pilots for the South African Aviation Corps.

June

- 19 – The Natives Land Act is passed, limiting land ownership for blacks to black territories.

November

- 6 – Mohandas Gandhi is arrested while leading a march of Indian miners in South Africa.

Unknown date

- The City of Greater Cape Town is formed by the union of Central Cape Town, Green Point and Sea Point, Woodstock, Maitland, Mowbray, Rondebosch, Claremont and Kalk Bay.

== Births ==
- 6 April – A. P. Mda, co-founder of the African National Congress Youth League (ANCYL) and Pan Africanist Congress of Azania (d. 1993)
- 10 September – Zephania Mothopeng, politician and activist (d. 1990)
- 9 December – Gerard Sekoto, artist. (d. 1993)

== Deaths ==
- 12 March – Christoffel Cornelis Froneman, commandant of the Orange Free State and founder of Marquard. (b. 1846)
- 30 April – Daniël Jacobus Erasmus, acting state president of the Zuid-Afrikaansche Republiek. (b. 1830)
- 16 November – Abraham Fischer, Prime Minister of the Orange River Colony. (b. 1850)

== Railways ==
=== Railway lines opened ===
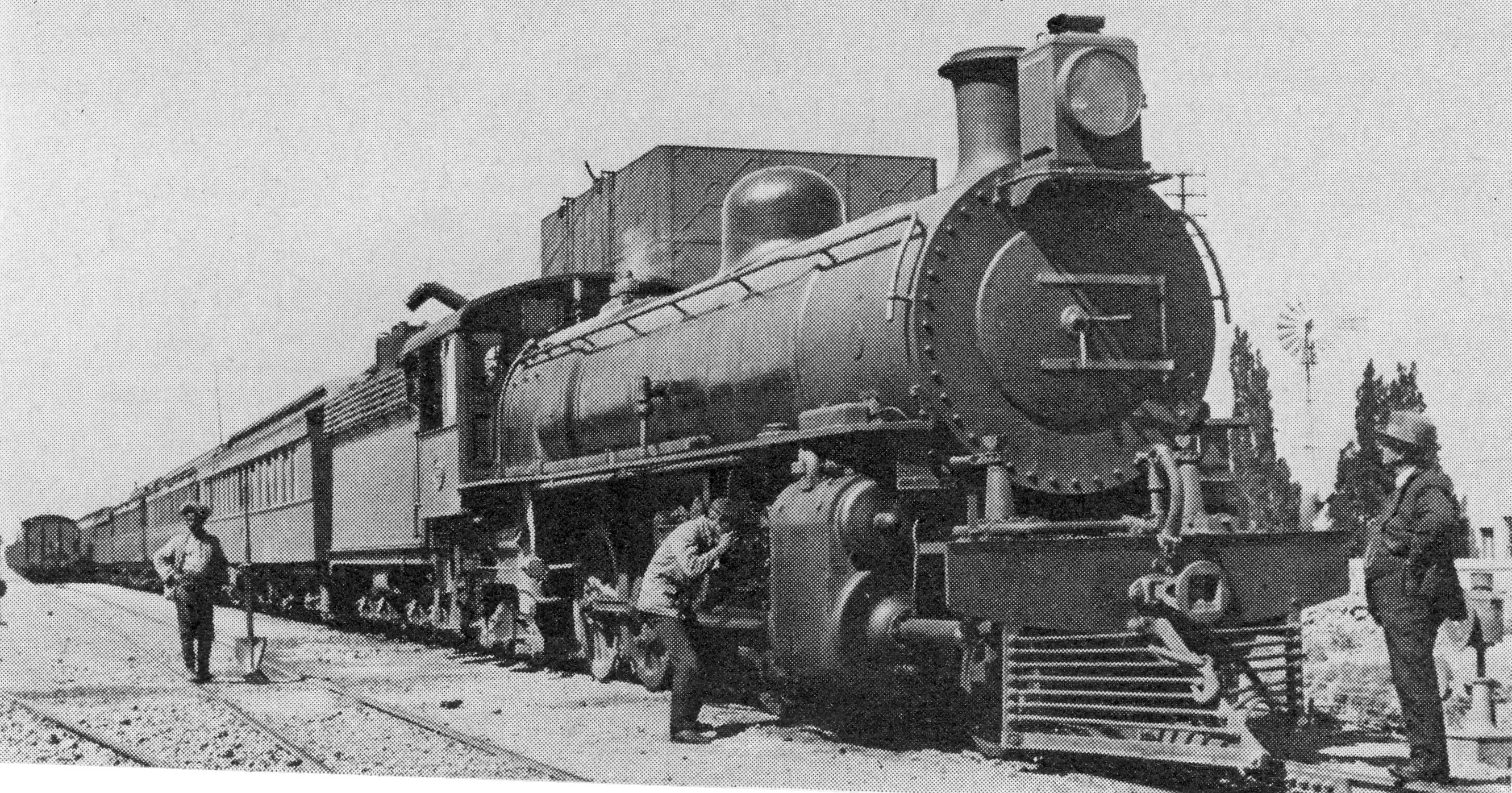
SAR Class 4A

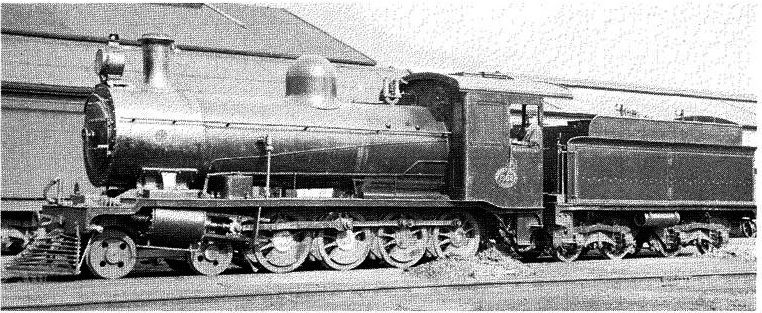
NCCR Class 7, SAR Class 7F

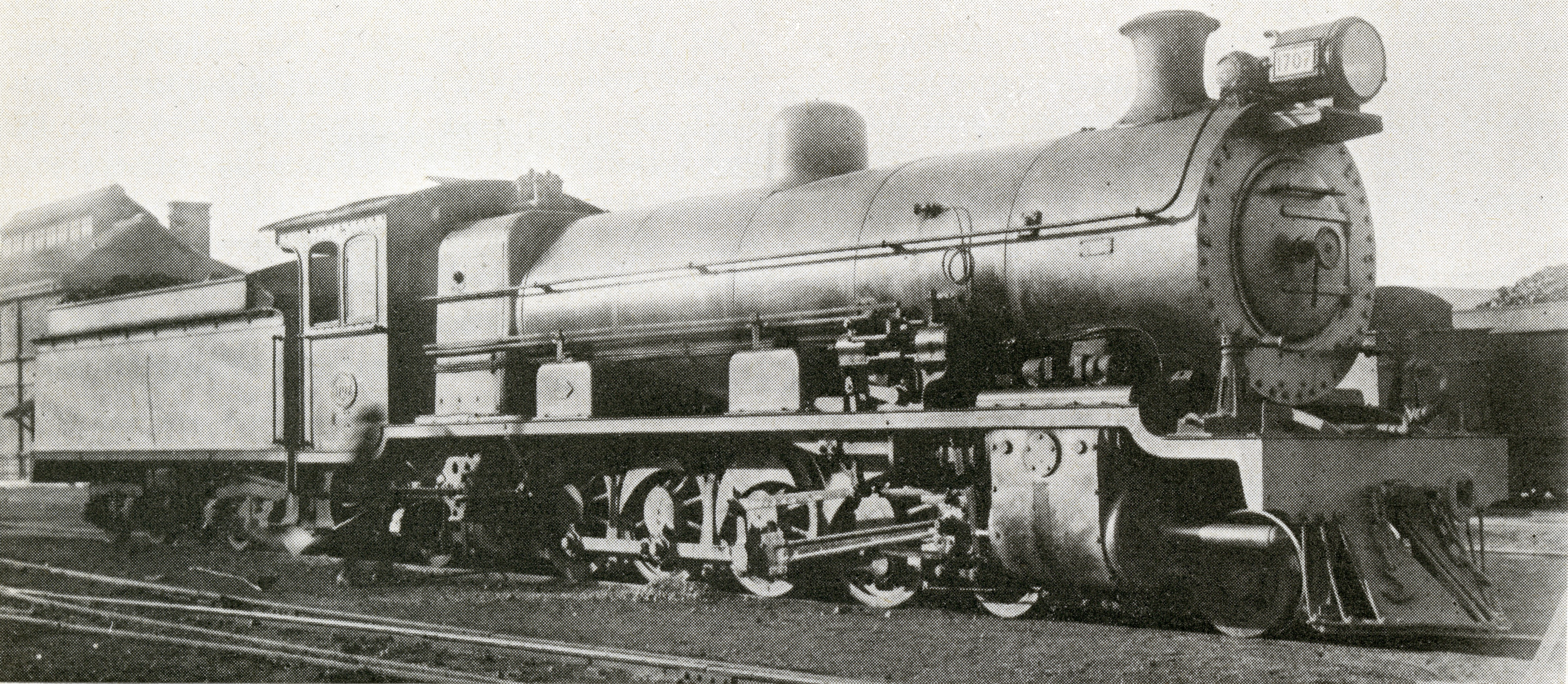
SAR Class 14

- 5 March – Cape – Vredenburg to Saldanha (Narrow gauge), 9 miles 65 chains (15.8 kilometres).
- 15 May – Free State – Arlington to Senekal, 27 miles 30 chains (44.1 kilometres).
- 15 July – Cape – Butterworth to Idutywa, 26 miles 74 chains (43.3 kilometres).
- 6 August – Cape – George to Oudtshoorn, 45 miles 30 chains (73.0 kilometres).
- 3 November – Cape – Graafwater to Kleipan, 22 miles 67 chains (36.8 kilometres).
- 3 November – Free State – Reitz to Marsala, 28 miles 69 chains (46.4 kilometres).
- 10 November – Transvaal – Nelspruit to Sabie, 55 miles 36 chains (89.2 kilometres).
- 1 December – Natal – Greytown to Ahrens, 19 miles 70 chains (32.0 kilometres).
- 5 December – Transvaal – Bandelierkop to Lilliput, 83 miles 33 chains (134.2 kilometres).
- 15 December – Natal – Tendeka to Piet Retief (Transvaal), 76 miles 35 chains (123.0 kilometres).

=== Locomotives ===
- Two new Cape gauge locomotive types enter service on the South African Railways (SAR):
  - The first of ten Class 4A 4-8-2 Mountain type steam locomotives.
  - The first of 45 Class 14 4-8-2 Mountain type locomotives.
- The New Cape Central Railway places three Cape 7th Class 4-8-0 Mastodon type locomotives in service.

== Sports ==
=== Rugby ===
- 11 January – The South African Springboks beat the French Les Tricolores 38–5 in Bordeaux, France.
