= 1819 in South Africa =

- Decades: 1790s; 1800s; 1810s; 1820s; 1830s
- See also: List of years in South Africa

The following lists events that happened during 1819 in South Africa.

== Events ==
- The 5th Cape Frontier War ends
- Dutch Reformed Church congregations are founded in Beaufort West and Somerset West
- Ndlambe defeats British ally Ngqika at Amalinde.
- Colonial forces heavily defeat Ndlambe at Grahamstown.
- Ngqika-Cape alliance collapses as Gov. Somerset claims land between Fish & Keiskamma Rivers as a buffer zone.
- AmaZulu under Shaka defeat AmaNdwandwe at Gqokoli Hill.

== Births ==
- 17 September - Marthinus Wessel Pretorius, the first president of the South African Republic and founder of Pretoria, is born on the farm Pretoriuskloof in the Graaff-Reinet district of the Cape Colony
