= 1823 in South Africa =

- Decades: 1800s; 1810s; 1820s; 1830s; 1840s
- See also: List of years in South Africa

The following lists events that happened during 1823 in South Africa.

== Events ==
- London Missionary Society sets up southern Africa's first printing press in Tyhume Valley.
- Cape government enacts "ameliorative" laws to regulate slave treatment, outlawing the public flogging of female slaves.
- AmaKhumalo, led by Mzilikazi, migrate north of the Vaal River due to the Difaqane.

== Births ==
- Lewis Broadbent, a Methodist missionary in India and son of the Methodist missionary Samuel Broadbent is born at Leeudoringstad, 16 km from Wolmaransstad
