= 1830 in South Africa =

- Decades: 1810s; 1820s; 1830s; 1840s; 1850s
- See also: List of years in South Africa

The following lists events that happened during 1830 in South Africa.

== Events ==
- 9 April - The first issue of the Dutch newspaper De Zuid-Afrikaan in the Cape Colony
- Full civil privileges are granted to Roman Catholics in the Cape Colony
- The road over Sir Lowry's Pass is opened
