= 13th century in South Africa =

- BCE Early CE « 13th » 14th 15th century
- List of years in South Africa

== Events ==
- Mapungubwe flourished as a trading center in modern-day Limpopo province throughout the century. It receded in importance by 1270.
