= History of South Africa (1652–1815) =

Although the Portuguese basked in the nautical achievement of successfully navigating the cape, they showed little interest in colonization. The area's fierce weather and rocky shoreline posed a threat to their ships, and many of their attempts to trade with the local Khoikhoi ended in conflict. The Portuguese found the Mozambican coast more attractive, with appealing bays to use as waystations, prawns, and links to gold ore in the interior.

The Portuguese had little competition in the region until the late 16th century, when the English and Dutch began to challenge them along their trade routes. Stops at the continent's southern tip increased, and the cape became a regular stopover for scurvy-ridden crews.

In 1647, a Dutch vessel, the Haarlem, was wrecked in the present-day Table Bay. After being rescued, the marooned crew recommended that a permanent station be established in the bay. The Dutch East India Company (in the Dutch of the day: Vereenigde Oostindische Compagnie, or VOC), one of the major European trading houses sailing the spice route to the East, had no intention of colonizing the area, instead wanting only to establish a secure base camp where passing ships could shelter, and where hungry sailors could stock up on fresh supplies of meat, fruit, and vegetables. To this end, a small VOC expedition under the command of Jan van Riebeeck reached Table Bay on April 6, 1652. The Cape was under Dutch rule from 1652 to 1795 and again from 1803 to 1806.

== Arrival of the Dutch ==
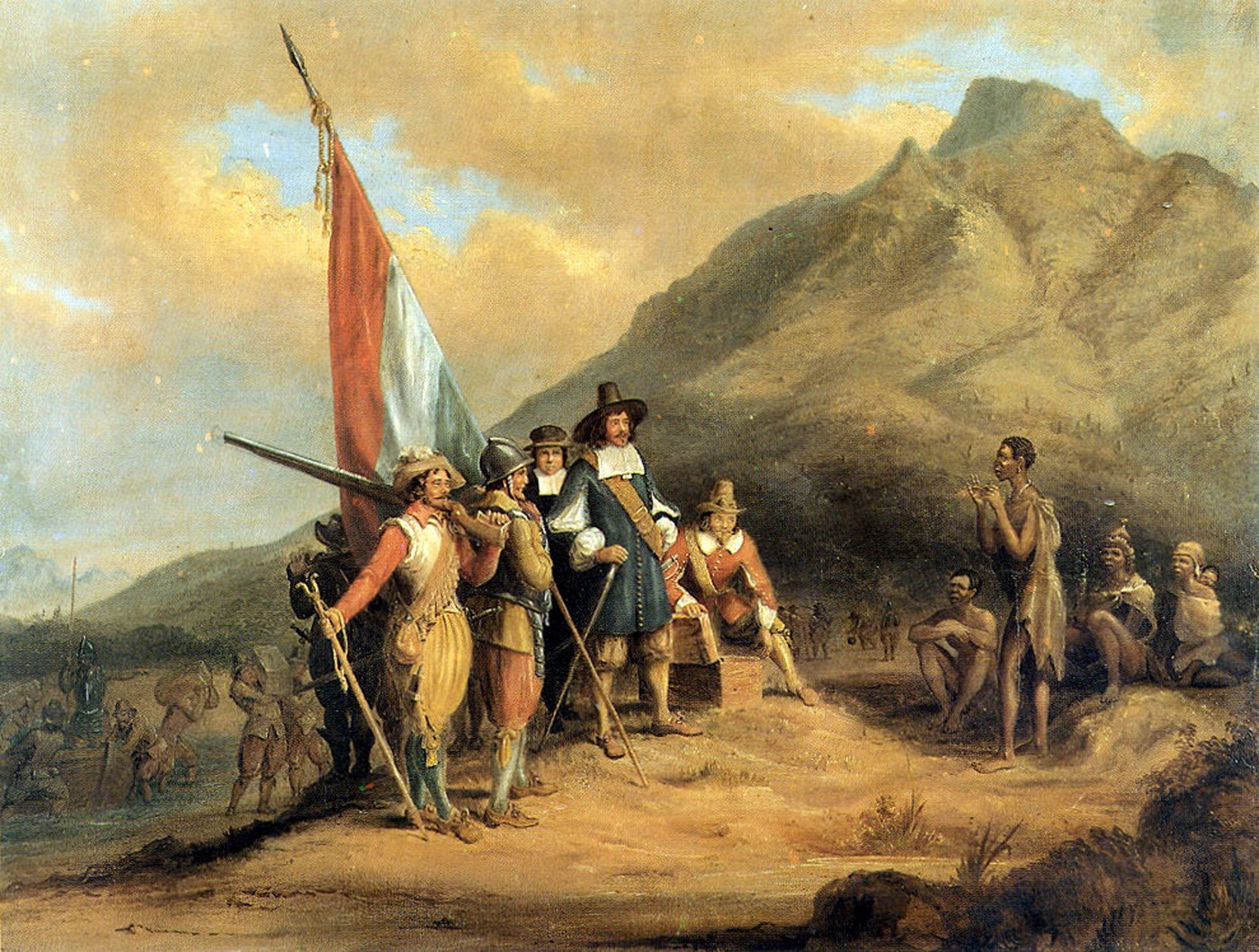
Painting of an account of the arrival of Jan van Riebeeck, by Charles Bell.

While the new settlement traded out of necessity with the neighbouring Khoikhoi, relations between them were strained, and the Dutch authorities attempted to restrict contact. Partly as a consequence, VOC employees found themselves faced with a labour shortage. To remedy this, they released a small number of Dutch from their contracts and permitted them to establish farms, with which they would supply the great VOC settlement from their harvests. This arrangement proved highly successful, producing abundant supplies of fruit, vegetables, wheat, and wine; they later raised livestock. The small initial group of free burghers, as these farmers were known, steadily increased and began to expand their farms further north and east into the territory of the Khoikhoi.

The majority of burghers had Dutch ancestry and belonged to the Calvinist Reformed Church of the Netherlands, but there were also numerous Germans as well as some Scandinavians. In 1688 the Dutch and the Germans were joined by the French Huguenots, also Calvinists, who were fleeing religious persecution under King Louis XIV.

In addition to establishing the free burgher system, van Riebeeck and the VOC began indenture Khoikhoi and San people as servants. They additionally began to import large numbers of slaves, primarily from Madagascar and Indonesia. These slaves often married Dutch settlers, and their descendants became known as the Cape Coloureds and the Cape Malays. A significant number of the offspring from the White and slave unions were absorbed into the local proto-Afrikaans speaking White population. With this additional labour, the areas occupied by the VOC expanded further to the north and east, with inevitable clashes with the Khoikhoi. The newcomers drove the beleaguered Khoikhoi from their traditional lands and destroyed them with superior weapons when they fought back, which they did in a number of major wars and with guerrilla resistance movements which continued into the 19th century. Europeans also brought diseases which had devastating effects against people whose immune systems were not adapted to them. Most survivors were left with no option but to work for the Europeans in an exploitative arrangement that differed little from slavery. Over time, the Khoisan, their European overseers, and the imported slaves mixed, with the offspring of these unions forming the basis for today's Coloured population.

The best-known Khoikhoi groups included the Griqua, who had originally lived on the western coast between St Helena Bay and the Cederberg Range. In the late 18th century, they managed to acquire guns and horses and began trekking northeast. En route other groups of Khoisan, people of mixed-ethnicity, and even white adventurers joined them, and they rapidly gained a reputation as a formidable military force. Ultimately, the Griquas reached the Highveld around present-day Kimberley, where they carved out territory that came to be known as Griqualand.

== Burgher expansion ==
As the burghers, too, continued to expand into the rugged hinterlands of the north and east, many began to take up a semi-nomadic pastoralist lifestyle, in some ways not far removed from that of the Khoikhoi they displaced. In addition to its herds, a family might have a wagon, a tent, a Bible, and a few guns. As they became more settled, they would build a mud-walled cottage, frequently located, by choice, days of travel from the nearest European. These were the first of the Trekboere (Wandering Farmers, later shortened to Boers), completely independent of official controls, extraordinarily self-sufficient, and isolated. Their harsh lifestyle produced individualists who were well acquainted with the land. Like many pioneers with Christian backgrounds, the burghers attempted to live their lives based on teachings from the Bible.
