= Philippolis =

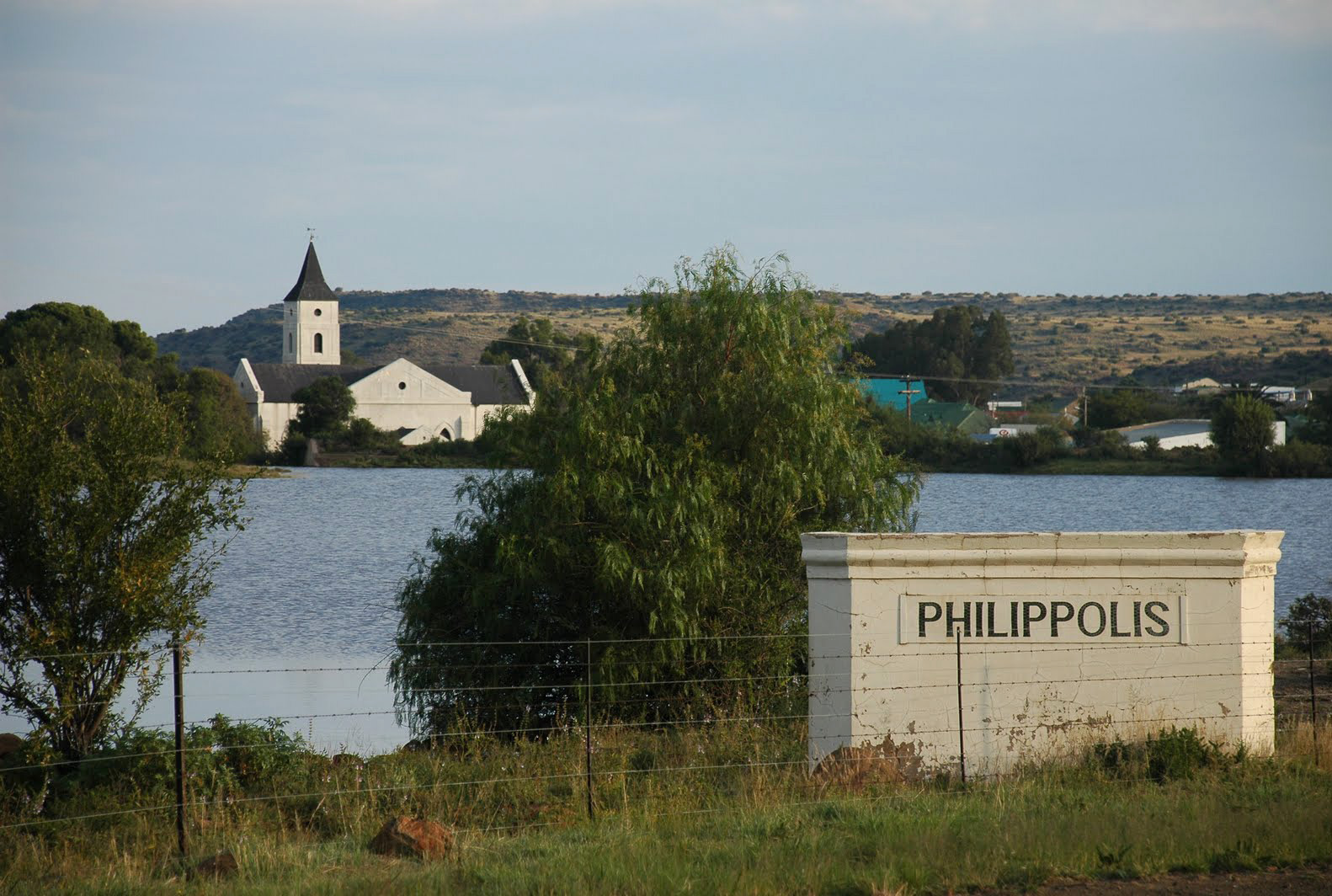
- Philippolis

- Location within Free State (South African province) Location within South Africa
- Coordinates: 30°16′S 25°17′E
- Country: South Africa
- Province: Free State
- District: Xhariep
- Municipality: Kopanong
- Established: 1823

Government
  - Type: Ward 4
  - Councillor: Nomvulazana Judith Stuurman

Area
  - Total: 39.6 km^{2} (15.3 sq mi)

Population (2011)
  - Total: 3,648
  - Density: 92.1/km^{2} (239/sq mi)

Racial makeup (2011)
  - Black African: 65.1%
  - Coloured: 27.6%
  - Indian/Asian: 0.5%
  - White: 5.9%
  - Other: 0.9%

First languages (2011)
  - Afrikaans: 41.2%
  - Xhosa: 29.3%
  - Sotho: 25.7%
  - English: 1.3%
  - Other: 2.3%
- Time zone: UTC+2 (SAST)
- Postal code (street): 9970
- PO box: 9970
- Area code: 051
- Website: www.philippolisinfo.co.za/historical.htm

Philippolis is a town in the Free State province of South Africa. The town is the birthplace of writer and intellectual Sir Laurens van der Post, actress Brümilda van Rensburg and Springboks rugby player Adriaan Strauss. It is regarded as one of the first colonial settlements in the Free State.

== History ==
The London Missionary Society founded Philippolis in 1823 as a mission station serving the local Griqua people. At first, the area was referred to as Southern Transorangia. The town takes its name from Dr John Philip, who was the superintendent of the Society from 1819 to 1849. Adam Kok II, a Griqua leader, settled in Philippolis with his people in 1826 and became the protector of the mission station. Kok II and some of his followers moved to Philippolis from Griquatown (about 200 km away) following conflict in the area. When Adam Kok II was given possession of the mission station it was on condition that he promised to protect the San against the aggression of the Boers and the London Missionary Society hoped that the Griqua would promote peace in the region. However, Philippolis became a base from which a number of deadly commandos against the San people were organised within a year of the Griqua arrival. This violated the agreement made between the London Missionary Society and Adam Kok II and eventually the San were driven out of the area. Kok's son, Adam Kok III and his followers later migrated across the Drakensberg mountains to settle in Kokstad in Griqualand East.

== Monuments and tourist attractions ==
The town has a number of declared heritage sites including an historical jail that has been turned into a bed and breakfast guest house.

=== Cannons ===
Two naval cannons stand on top of a small hill which were presented by the Cape colonial government in 1840 to Adam Kok III who was the Griqua chief at that time. The cannons are fired during the town's Witblits festival held in April. These cannons may have been used during the various wars between the Griqua, Basotho and the Boers.

=== Emily Hobhouse memorial ===
A memorial was erected in Philippolis to commemorate English activist Emily Hobhouse, who worked to bring the poor conditions of Second Boer War concentration camps to the British public's attention. After the conflict's end, Hobhouse established a spinning and weaving school in Philippolis in 1905.

=== Karoo Artist's Café ===
The building in which this café is now situated in, was the first school building in the town, built in the 1830s.

=== Transgariep Museum ===
This museum was opened on 2 March 1982. It focuses on the London Missionary Society, Adam Kok III and the Griqua as well as Emily Hobhouse and her weaving school.

=== The Philippolis Jail ===
The town jail was built in 1872 and served as a jail for 70 years. It was subsequently converted into a police station and several changes were made such as the repurposing of jail cells into charge offices. The SADF (South African Defence Force) used the jail as an army barracks from 1972 to 1982. The jail was abandoned from 1982 until 1998 when it was restored and turned into a bed and breakfast guest house.

=== Old Dutch Reformed Church ===
The Dutch Reformed Church in South Africa (NGK) in Philippolis was opened in 1871. The church is famous for its pulpit which is carved from wild olive and erected with no nails, screws or bolts. This site is a declared Provincial Heritage Site.

=== Other declared heritage sites in the area ===
- The property with the Old Victorian Library building thereon, Voortrekker Street, Donated by the Jacobson Family for the benefit of the Townspeople
- The property with the Dwelling-house thereon, 24 Tobie Muller Street
- The property with the Dwelling-house thereon, being certain Portion “C” of Erf 97, Tobie Muller Street
- The property with the Dwelling-house and adjoining building thereon, 26 Kok Street
- The property, together with the Karoo styled Dwelling-house thereon, 4 Justisie Street
- The Old Pound, together with a portion of surrounding land, being 5 metres on the northern and western side of the structure, the land on the eastern site to and bordered by Justisie Street and the land on the southern side thereof to and bordered by Erf 129, Philippolis.
- The property, together with the Victorian House thereon, 7 Colin Fraser Street (Amended declared in 1990.
- The historic Old Power Magazine, together with 10 metres of surrounding land, situated on Subdivision 20 of the Town Lands of Philippolis 143, declared in 1991.
- The wagon house adjacent the Victorian House together with the property on which they are situated, at 6 and 7 Colin Fraser Street.declared in 1990.

== Gallery ==
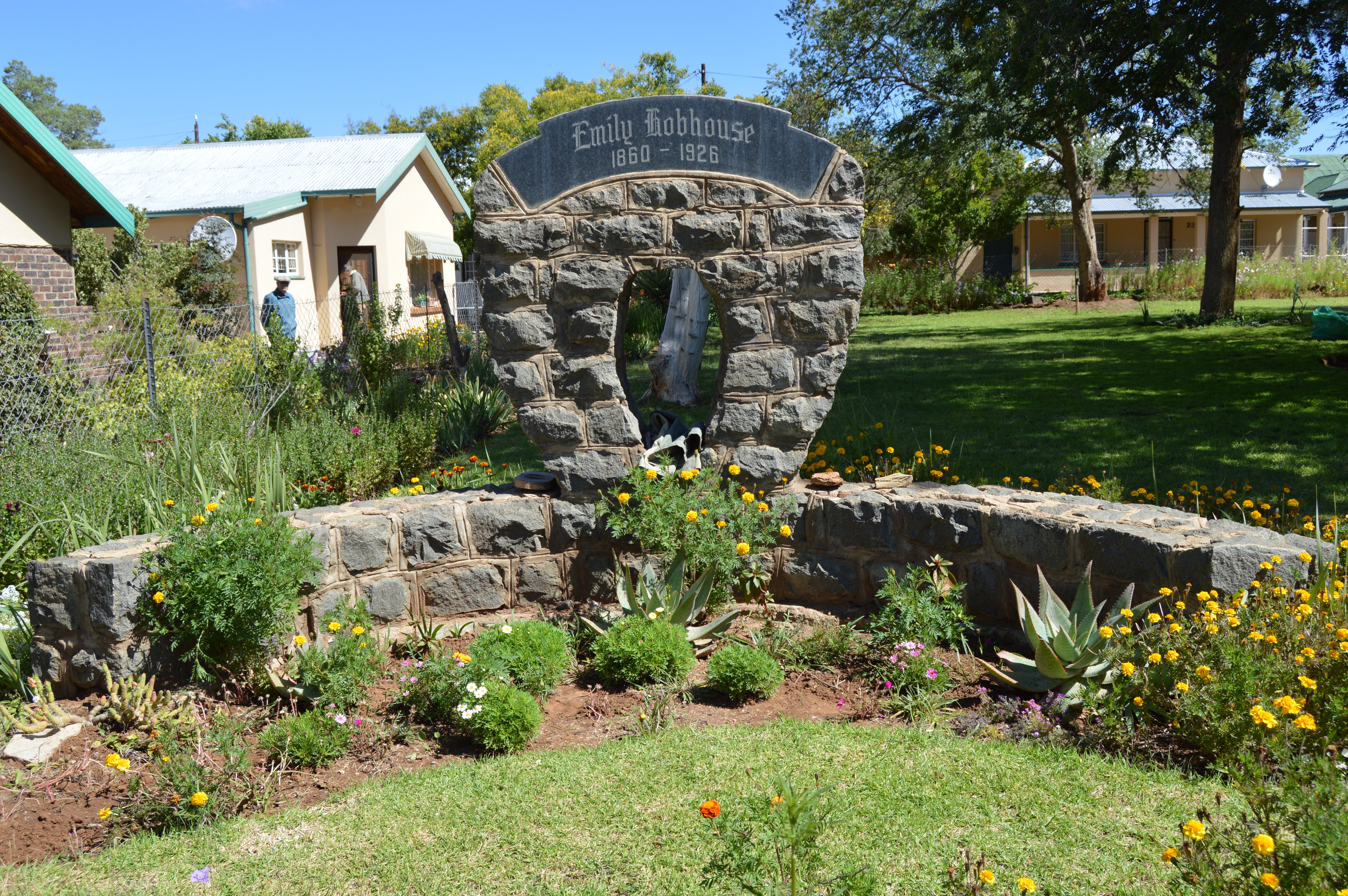
Emily Hobhouse garden of remembrance Philippolis.

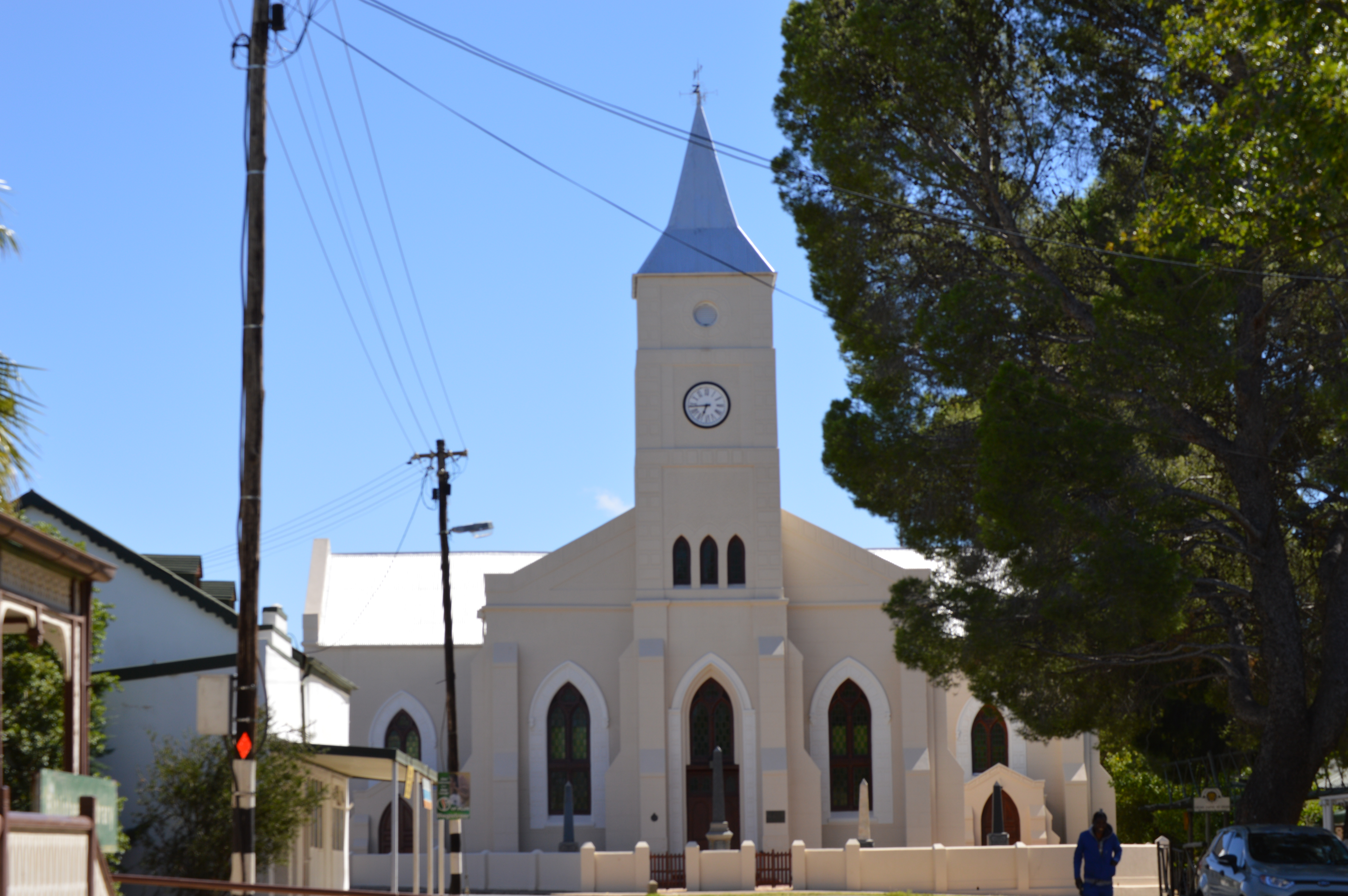
View of NG Kerk in Philippolis.

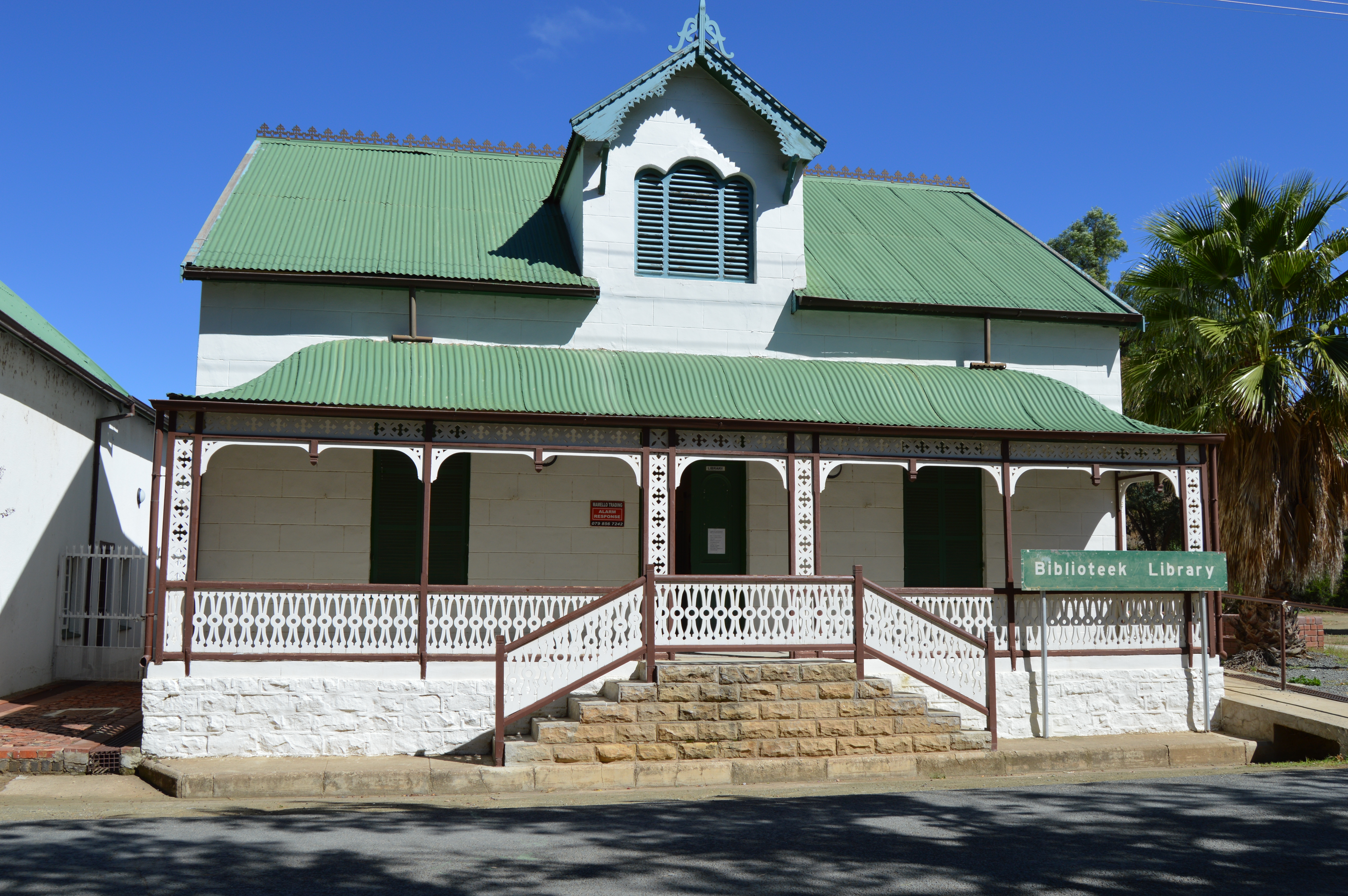
Philippolis library Philippolis.

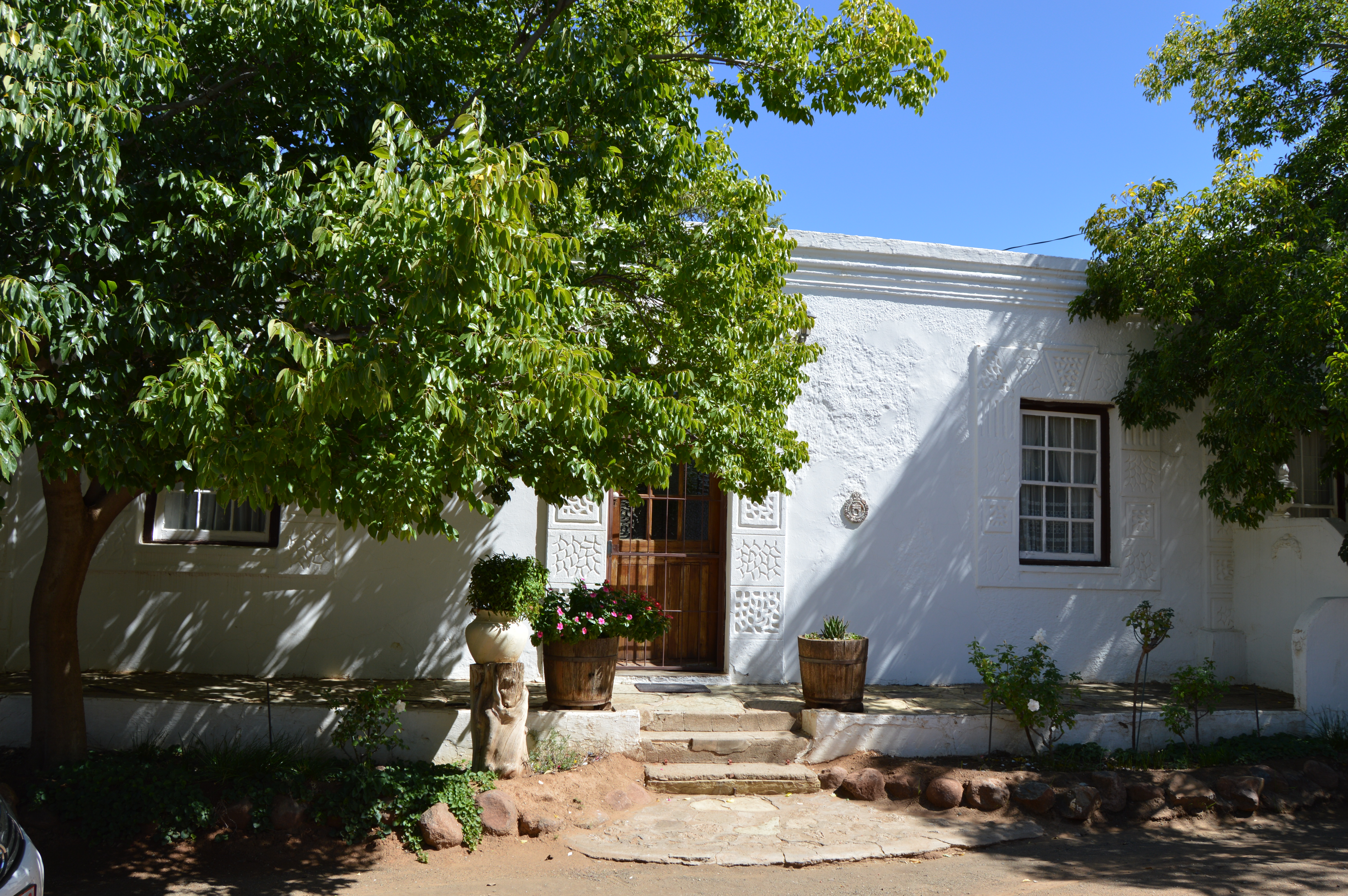
26 Kok Street dwelling house Philippolis.

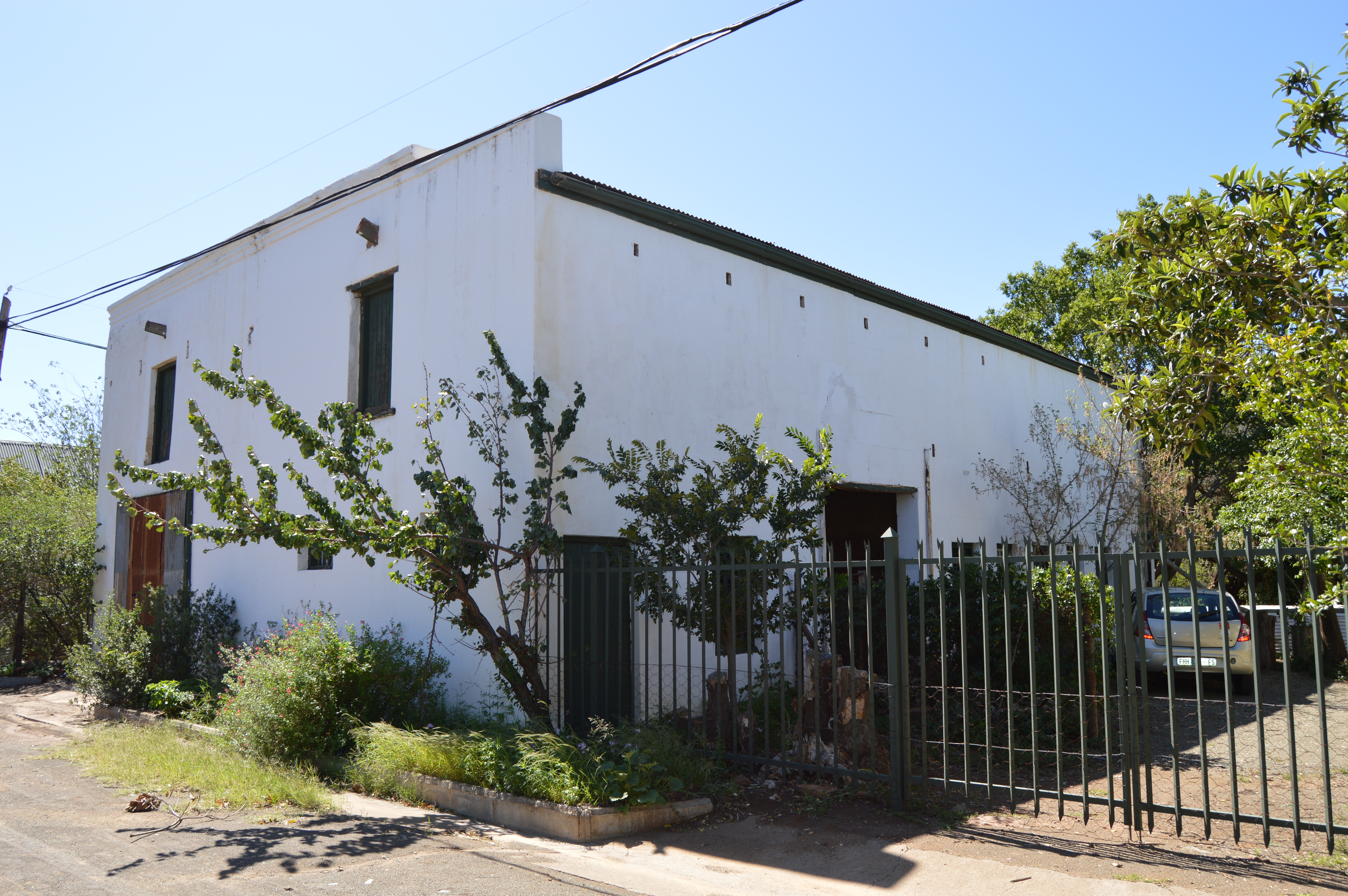
Wagon house Philippolis.
