= 1841 in South Africa =

- Decades: 1820s; 1830s; 1840s; 1850s; 1860s
- See also: List of years in South Africa

The following lists events that happened during 1841 in South Africa.

== Events ==
- Missionary David Livingstone arrives in the Cape Colony and proceeds to Kuruman before journeying through Central Africa.
- Voortrekkers set up a council in Potchefstroom
- Cape Masters and Servants Ordinance is passed, replacing Ordinance 50. It removes racial distinction among servants. White, coloured, and ex-slaves face equal legal penalties if they commit contract breaches.
- Refugees return to Natal, increasing the African population. The Boers see this as a security threat so the Volksraad orders "surplus" Africans, those not working for whites, to relocate between the Mtamvuba and Mzimvubu Rivers.

== Deaths ==
- 1 May - Sir Rufane Shaw Donkin, acting Governor of the Cape Colony who supervised the arrival and settling of the British settlers and who founded Port Elizabeth, dies in Southampton, England
