= 1912 in South Africa =

- Decades: 1890s; 1900s; 1910s; 1920s; 1930s
- See also: List of years in South Africa

The following lists events that happened during 1912 in South Africa.

== Incumbents ==
- Monarch: King George V.
- Governor-General and High Commissioner for Southern Africa: The Viscount Gladstone.
- Prime Minister: Louis Botha.
- Chief Justice: John de Villiers, 1st Baron de Villiers

== Events ==
January

- 1 – The South African Railways implements the reclassification and renumbering of the rolling stock of its three constituent Colonial railways, the Cape Government Railways, the Natal Government Railways and the Central South African Railways.
- 4 – The outbreak of smallpox is reported in the Malay Location, Johannesburg.
- 8 – The South African Native National Congress (now ANC) is formed in Bloemfontein and John Langalibalele Dube becomes the first president.
- 16 – Cases of smallpox are discovered in Durban.

February

- 15 – The Mkuze Game Reserve is proclaimed a protected area.

March

- The shield of the coat of arms on the Red Ensign used in South Africa is redesigned to include a white roundel.

July

- 1 – The Union Defence Forces, comprising a Permanent Force and a Citizen Force, were established.
- 1 – Brig Gen Henry Lukin appointed Inspector-General of the Permanent Force.
- 1 – Brig Gen Christian Frederick Beyers appointed Commandant-General of the Citizen Force.

Unknown date

- The town of Hobhouse is established and named after Emily Hobhouse.

== Births ==
- 12 March – John Fairbairn, naval officer, (d. 1984)
- 18 May – Walter Sisulu, anti-apartheid activist. (d. 2003)
- 27 May – Cedric Phatudi, Chief Minister of Lebowa bantustan (d. 1987)

== Deaths ==
- 21 May – Julius Wernher, financier and mine magnate. (b. 1850)

== Railways ==
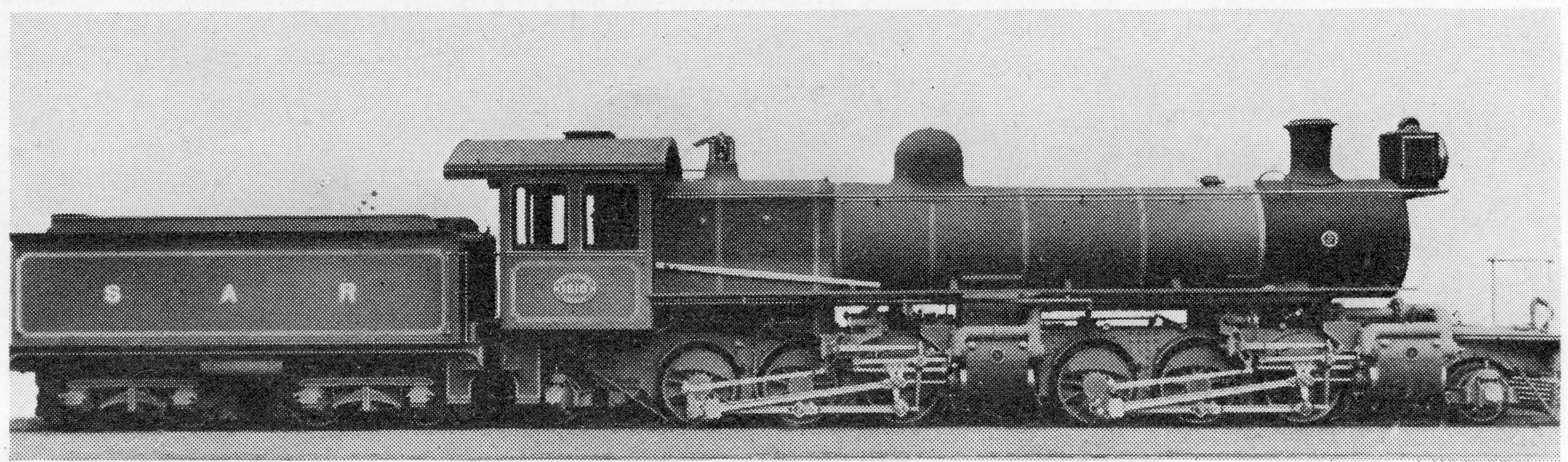
Class ME 2-6-6-2

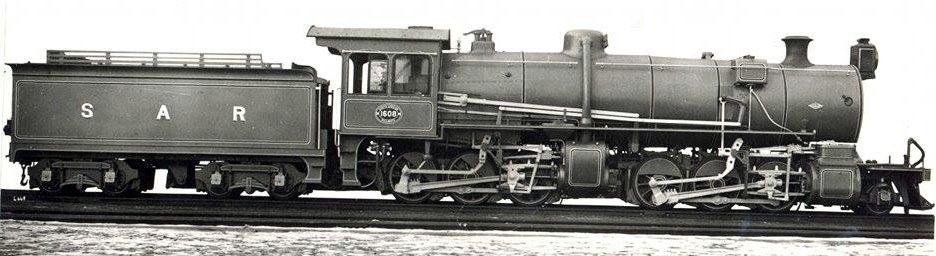
Class MC 2-6-6-0

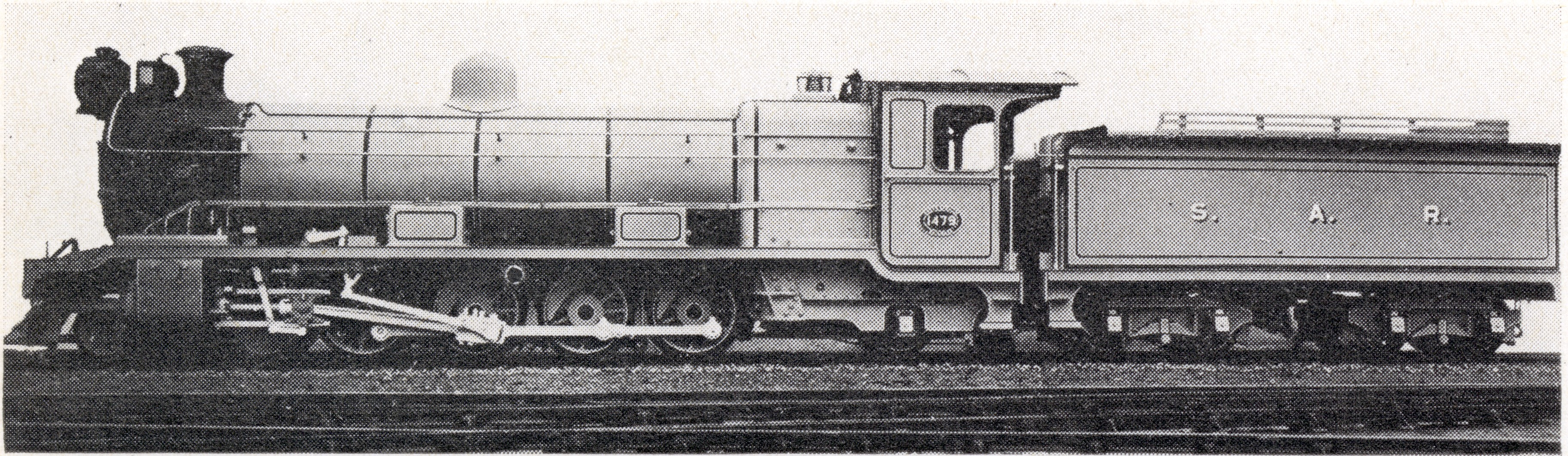
Class 3B 4-8-2

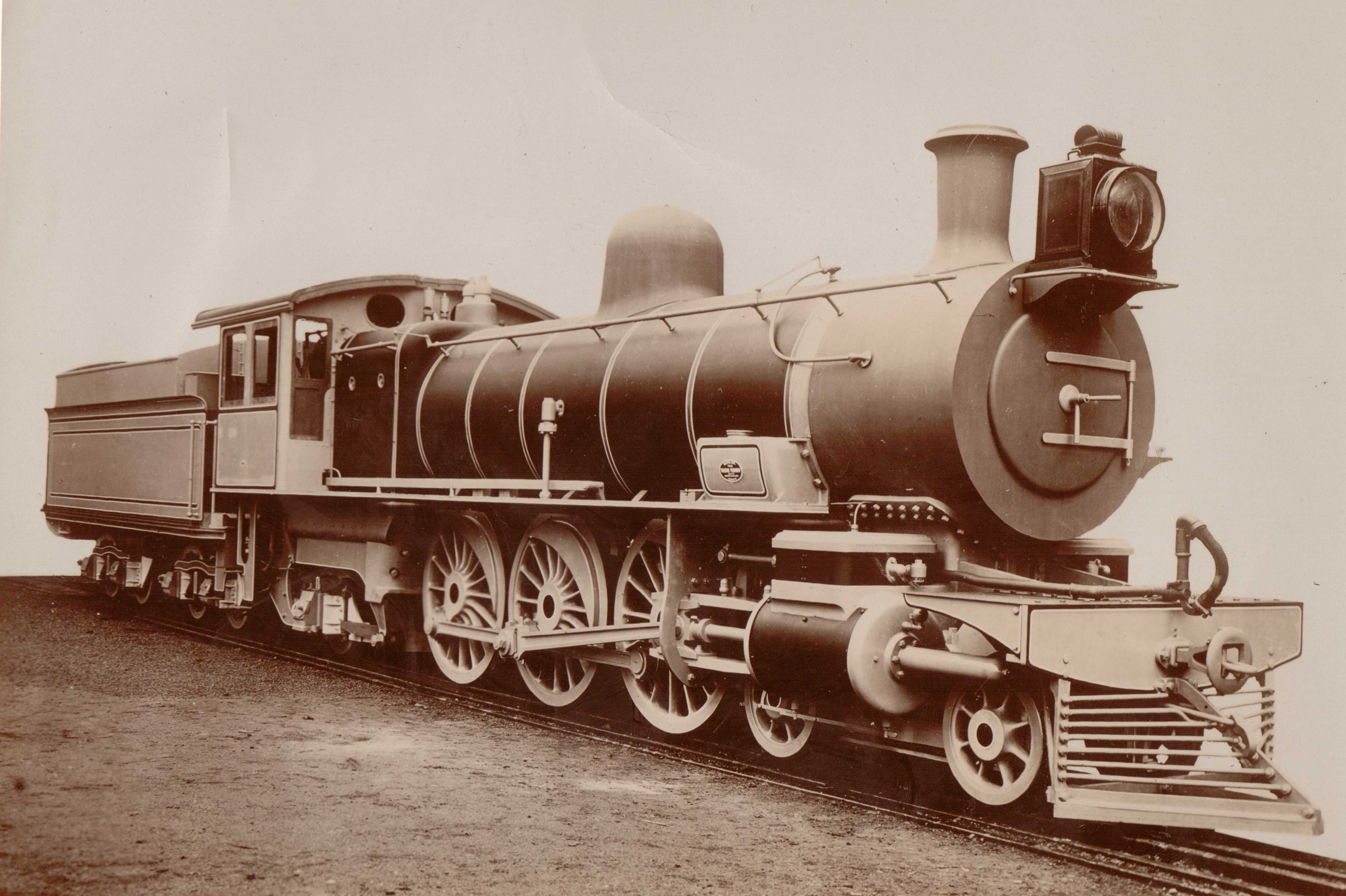
Class 5 4-6-2

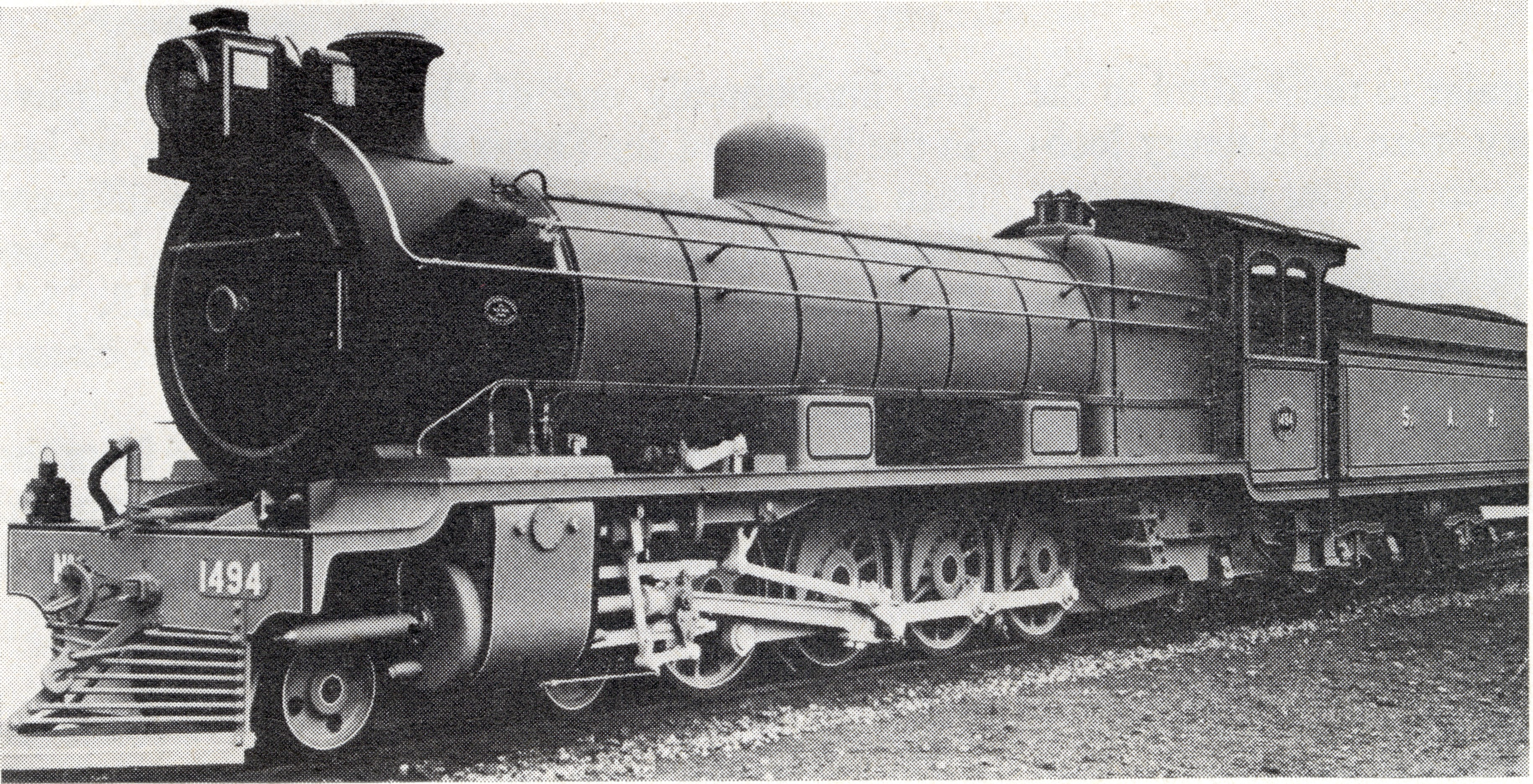
Class 12 4-8-2

=== Railway lines opened ===
- 7 February – Free State – Jammerdrif to Wepener, 4 miles 7 chains (6.6 kilometres).
- 15 April – Transvaal – Buhrmannsdrif to Ottoshoop, 11 miles 70 chains (19.1 kilometres).
- 1 May – Free State – Firham (Transvaal) to Vrede, 44 miles 69 chains (72.2 kilometres).
- 20 May – Cape – Wolseley to Ceres, 10 miles 29 chains (16.7 kilometres).
- 1 August – Cape – Malenge to Franklin, 24 miles 49 chains (39.6 kilometres).
- 4 November – Transvaal – Zeerust to Ottoshoop, 18 miles 72 chains (30.4 kilometres).
- 9 November – Transvaal – Newington to Tzaneen, 132 miles 21 chains (212.9 kilometres).
- 2 December – Cape – Schoombee to Hofmeyr, 31 miles 3 chains (50.0 kilometres).
- 2 December – Cape – Ottery to Dieprivier, 2 miles 50 chains (4.2 kilometres).
- 16 December – Cape – Bergrivier to Vredenburg (Narrow gauge), 24 miles 48 chains (39.6 kilometres).
- 20 December – Cape – Melk to Motkop, 10 miles 31 chains (16.7 kilometres).

=== Locomotives ===
Five new Cape gauge locomotive types enter service on the South African Railways (SAR):

- January – A single Class ME 2-6-6-2 simple expansion Mallet articulated locomotive.
- Ten Class MC 2-6-6-0 Mallet articulated compound steam locomotives.
- Ten Class 3B 4-8-2 Mountain type steam locomotives that had been ordered by the Natal Government Railways the year before.
- Four "Enlarged Karoo Class" 4-6-2 Pacific type passenger locomotives that had been ordered by the Cape Government Railways in 1911, designated Class 5.
- April – The first eight of forty-six Class 12 4-8-2 Mountain type goods locomotives.

== Sports ==
=== Rugby ===
- 30 November – The South African Springboks beat Ireland 38–0 in Ireland.
