= Griqualand East =

Former 19th-century country

Coordinates: 30.5500°S 29.4167°E

Griqualand East Nieuw Griqualand Griekwaland-Oos
- 1862–1879
- Griqua Flag^{†} Emblem
- Motto: Pro Rege Lege et Grege; Latin: For King, Law and the People
- Seal

- Location of Griqualand East within the Cape Colony
- Status: British Colony (1874–1879)
- Capital: Kokstad
- Common languages: Dutch (written) proto-Afrikaans (spoken); Xhosa
- Government: Republic^{?}
- President^{?}
  - 1862–1875: Adam Kok III
- Legislature: Raad/Volksraad (12 members)
- History
  - Annexation of Philippolis Expulsion to Nomansland: 1860; 1862 (1863?)
  - Laager: 1862
  - Move from Mt.Currie: 1869
  - Kokstad founded: 1872
  - Annexation: 1874 ~ 1879
  - Adam Kok's death: 1875

Area
- Estimate^{‡}: 20,000 km^{2} (7,700 sq mi)

Population
  - Griqua: 1,100
  - Xhosa^{*} (Mpondo): 30,000
- Currency: Tokens
Succeeded by
Cape Colony
- † The Griqua flag is a vertically flipped version of the "Vierkleur" used by the South African Republic. A single source dates its origin to 1903; whether or not independent Griqualand East actually deployed it is uncertain. ‡ Maximum extend given, defined as unclaimed/un-annexed by other established governments. Total area was in flux throughout history. Source for given figure under References (below). * +Zulu refugees from earlier Shaka war

Griqualand East (Afrikaans: Griekwaland-Oos), officially known as New Griqualand (Dutch: Nieuw Griqualand), was one of four short-lived Griqua states in Southern Africa from the early 1860s until the late 1870s and was located between the Umzimkulu and Kinira Rivers, south of the Sotho Kingdom.

Griqualand East's capital, Kokstad, was the final place of settlement for a people who had migrated several times on their journey from the Cape of Good Hope and over the mountains of present-day Lesotho.

The territory was occupied by the British Empire and became a colony in 1874, shortly before the death of its founder and only leader, Adam Kok III. A short while later, the small territory was incorporated into the neighbouring Cape Colony. Though for a long time overshadowed in history by the story of the Voortrekkers, the trek of the Griquas has been described as "one of the great epics of the 19th century."

== History ==
=== Background ===
Before the arrival of migrants from the west and north, the area formed part of the Mpondo kingdom under King Faku, who ruled as sovereign of the ethnically Xhosa dynasty from 1815 to 1867. During his reign, Faku initially welcomed many refugees who came over the territory's north-eastern border, fleeing from the incursions and raids by the army of Shaka (leader of the Zulu Kingdom from 1816 to 1828). As Faku eventually realised that his warriors could not defend the eastern part of his kingdom against Shaka, he decided to evacuate the area, leaving behind what became known as Nomansland (often spelled "No-man's land" in contemporary sources).

Meanwhile, a group of Griquas who had left the Cape of Good Hope in the 18th century and had settled in the area around present-day Philippolis in 1826 faced the prospect of their area coming under the control of the emerging Orange Free State (Oranje Vrijstaat - officially established as a Boer republic in 1854). In 1861 most of these inhabitants embarked on an exhausting journey, leaving to move southwards over Ukhahlamba also called intaba zokhahlamba that means mountains of Ukhahlamba (today known as the Drakensberg mountain range), but first-hand witnesses give two differing narratives of the reasons and motivations for their last trek.

=== Arrival and settlement ===
Griqua and Boer states in Southern Africa, 19th century.

According to the account of John Robinson, first Premier of Natal, the inhabitants of Philippolis were invited by Sir George Grey, administrator of the area on behalf of the United Kingdom, to settle in the aforementioned Nomansland, south of what had by then become the British colony of Natal. Their settlement there was to avoid a potential conflict with the Free State and simultaneously serve as a buffer against Bushmen and "their predatory raids upon the farmers and natives of Natal" After their leader Adam Kok III had sent an advance party to survey the area, the entire group agreed to the arrangement and arrived there in 1862.

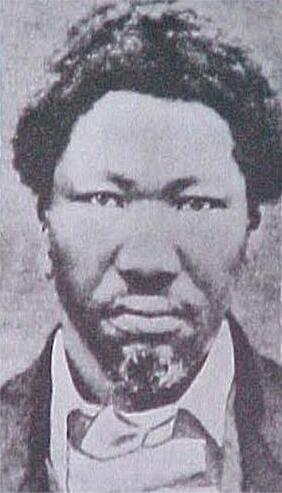
Adam Kok III

More recently recovered official documents, however, tell the story of a deal that was negotiated between the Colonial Office and the Free State in 1854, long before the Griquas had any knowledge of their fate. The Colonial Office agreed to undertake the expulsion of the entire population in exchange for a settlement of a border conflict between the Afrikaners and the Cape colonists. According to the sources, Adam Kok III and his followers only learned about the plans six years after the official document had been secretly signed. Realising that they could not muster a fighting force that could match the colonial army, and after having voiced their opposition to becoming either subjects to the Crown in the Cape Colony or servants in the Free State, they left their homeland under duress to go into exile in 1863.

Ultimately, all sources agree that the last great Griqua leader's followers ended up in the area around Mount Currie and set up a Laager, a simple settlement site made up of small huts, where they remained for over half a decade. In 1869, Reverend Dower of the London Mission Society visited the place and agreed to establish a church if the people were to move once more. Kok consulted with the populace, and they chose an area farther south of the mountain. The Griquas moved there in 1872, and founded the town of Kokstad, named in honour of their leader.

The state that was established around Kokstad, while Griqua ruled, was populated overwhelmingly by the pre-existing Xhosa speaking peoples, with the Griqua forming only a very small, politically dominant minority.

=== Government ===
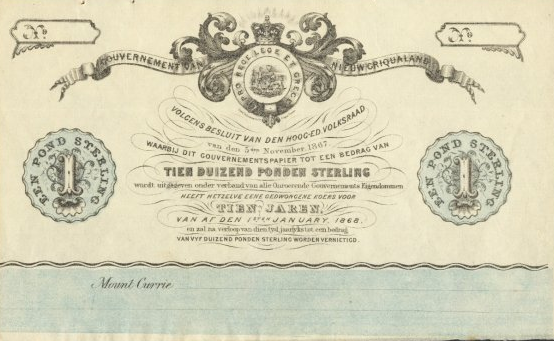
One Sterling Pound banknote of Nieuw Griqualand, 1868

Though, in historical terms, constantly on the move, with permanent settlements existing only for short intervals, the people of Griqualand East managed to establish a Raad (or Volksraad), a gathering of 12 members which made decisions on behalf of the Griqua population and formed delegations to deal with the surrounding polities.

==== Currency ====
In 1867, after the Bank of Durban had begun printing its own banknotes, Kok and his followers embarked on a similar experiment of their own and had about 10,000 one pound-notes printed for use in the area. The plans to actually introduce them never materialised, and, with the exception of a few remaining samples, almost all of them were destroyed without ever being in circulation.
After the move to Kokstad, however, a new venture in introducing a local currency was more successful in 1874; designed by Strachan and Co. and minted in Germany, several coins were used (see picture) and remained in circulation long after the disestablishment of the country.

Confirmation that the Strachan and Co circulated as money in the region from 1874 comes from the local Standard Bank at Kokstad . and the managing director of Strachan and Co

==== Symbolism ====
The seal included in the information-box is a rough replica of a seal shown on the first set of banknotes of 1867 which is the only known and surviving depiction. On the banknote itself, it is flanked to the left and right by a band or ribbon which reads "GOUVERNEMENT VAN | NIEUW GRIQUALAND" and includes a helm with mantling. The actual implied colours are unknown.
The Griqua flag is a vertically flipped version of the "Vierkleur" used by Transvaal and the South African Republic. A single source dates its first documented appearance to 1903, but the flag itself might have been in use earlier; whether or not independent Griqualand East actually deployed it is uncertain.

=== British Annexation (1878) ===
"There you have it... we were not consulted. We can say nothing."

- Adam Kok III
(comment on looming British annexation, 1874)

In the differing sources and versions of history, the end of Griqualand East's story is as contested as its beginning, and the reasons for the country's dissolution remain hazy. Local Cape sources record an official (but heavily qualified) request in 1869, from Adam Kok III, for the establishment of British rule, on condition that land title be respected and that Griqualand East should under no circumstances be incorporated into the Colony of Natal. Contemporary reports claimed that the Griquas then sold much of their land voluntarily, and that the overall annexation of the territory took place "at the wish of the inhabitants themselves." On the other hand, opinion among the Griqua people themselves seems to have been divided. A quote by Adam Kok III, upon learning of the Colonial Offices' plans, suggests that there was misunderstanding or even deception involved in the annexation of Griqualand East: "There you have it... we were not consulted. We can say nothing." The British assumed direct control of the territory in 1874.

What is known for a fact is that the Griqua leader, whose name still adorns the town he founded, died in December 1875 after being severely injured in a wagon-accident. At his funeral, his cousin commented that with Kok's death, the Griquas' last hope for an independent state in Southern Africa had died as well.

After coming under British rule, Griqualand East was administered by the British as a separate colony for several years. During this time, the Colonial Office put considerable pressure on the government of the neighbouring Cape Colony to annex the costly and turbulent territory. However the Cape, newly under a system of responsible government, was reluctant to assume responsibility for Griqualand East due to its considerable expenses and its considerably resentful population.

=== Incorporation into the Cape (1879) ===
Although initially the Cape had refused to annex the territory, agreement was reached after substantial negotiation and in 1877 the Cape Parliament passed the Griqualand East Annexation Act (Act 38 of 1877). The act was only promulgated two years later on 17 September 1879, when four magistrates were set up, at Kokstad, Matatiele, Mount Frere and Umzimkulu. The territory was also given two elected seats in the Cape Parliament, which at the time was elected through the multi-racial "Cape Qualified Franchise" system, whereby qualifications for suffrage were applied to all males, regardless of race.

The Griqua people had only ever been a small, ruling minority of the population of Griqualand East. Once independent Griqua rule was ended, the Xhosa speaking Pondo people, who had long constituted the majority of the Griqualand East population, came to own increasing amounts of land in the area, together with newly arriving European settlers. These demographic factors led to a further dilution of Griqua identity and a century later, under Apartheid, the territory was incorporated into the Xhosa "homeland" of the Transkei.

== Contemporary Griqualand ==
When the Union of South Africa was formed in 1910, the Cape Colony changed its name to "Cape Province", and during the 1980s, part of former Griqualand East was partitioned off into the Transkei, one of the four nominally independent Bantustans. In 1994, shortly before the first all-inclusive elections, it was incorporated into the southern part of the KwaZulu-Natal province. Kokstad retained its name and is today one of the main cities of the Harry Gwala District Municipality.

== See also ==
- Coloureds
- Natalia Republic
