= Ngwane =

Ngwane may refer to:

== People ==
- King Ngwane III of Swaziland (reigned 1745–1780)
- King Sobhuza I of Swaziland (c. 1788–1836), a.k.a. Ngwane IV
- King Bhunu of Swaziland (1876–1899), a.k.a. Ngwane V
- Trevor Ngwane (born 1960), South African socialist activist
- Tshepo Ngwane (1974–2015), South African actor

== See also ==
- KaNgwane
- Ngwane National Liberatory Congress
- Tibiyo Taka Ngwane
