= Adam Kok III =

Griqua leader (1811–1875)

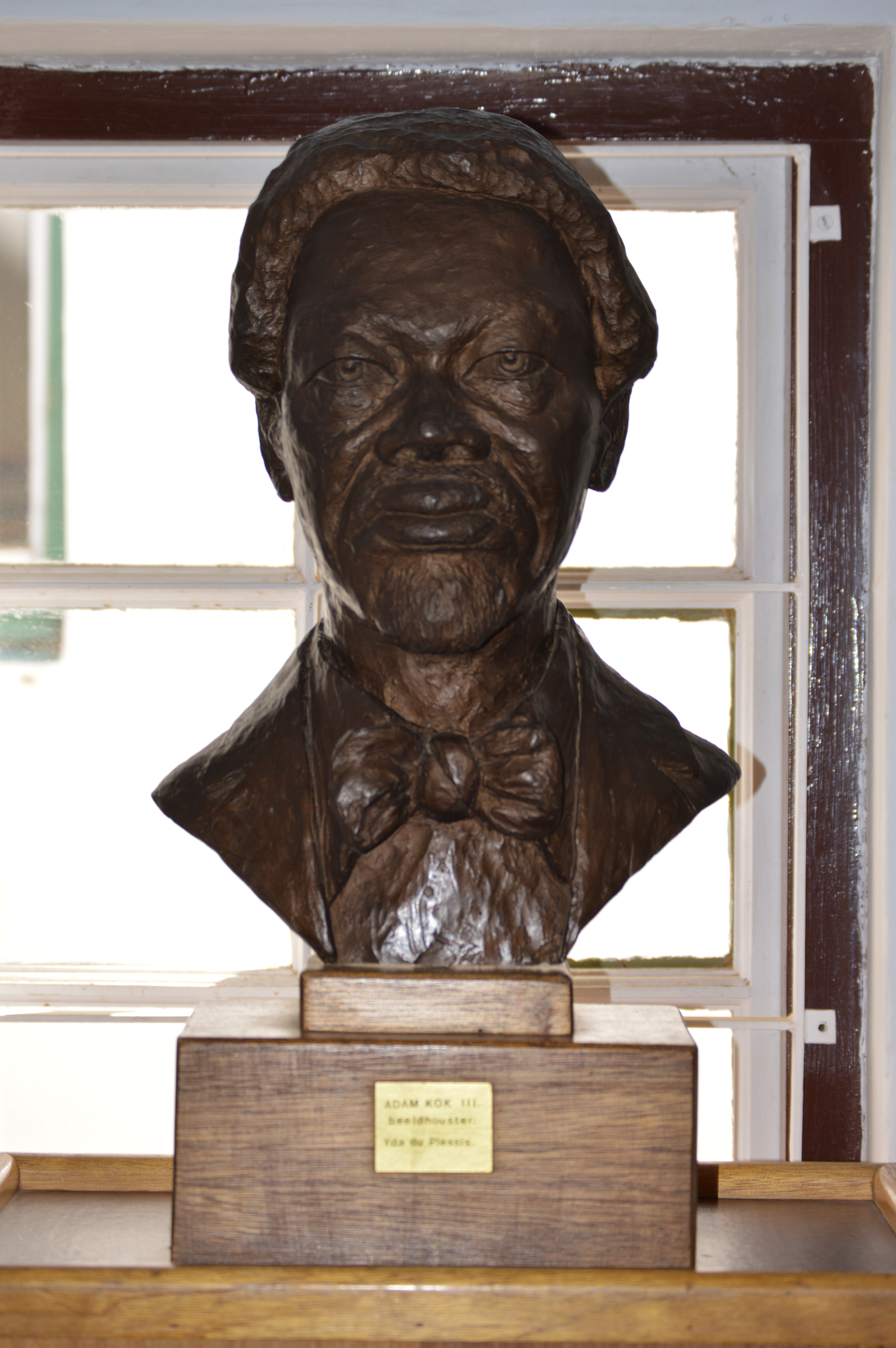
- Adam Kok III bust at Transgariep Museum in Philippolis
- Preceded by: Adam Kok II
- Succeeded by: no-one

Personal details
- Born: 16 October 1811 South Africa
- Died: 30 December 1875 (aged 64) Umzimkhulu, Natal
- Relations: Adam Kok II (father), Adam Kok (grandfather)

Adam Kok III (16 October 1811 – 30 December 1875) was a leader of the Griqua people in South Africa.

== Early life ==
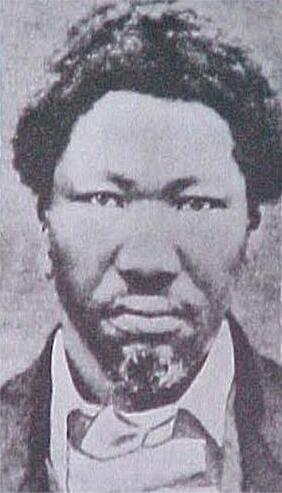
Adam Kok

The son of Adam Kok II, he was born in Griqualand West. Kok III was educated at the Philippolis Mission School after his family and father's followers moved to the area after disputes with other groups. He was appointed as a member of the Griqua Council at a young age and would act as chief while his father was away. He succeeded his father as the ruler and leader of the Griqua in Philippolis after the death of his father in 1835. His older brother, Abraham, could have taken over as chief but Kok III's political experience impressed the Griqua elders and he was therefore deemed to be the preferred choice to replace his father.

== Interaction with other groups ==
The Napier Treaty, signed in 1843 between Moshoeshoe I and Adam Kok III – advised and assisted by the missionaries – Eugene Cassalis and John Philip on the one hand and the Cape governor Sir George Napier on the other hand – recognised Moshoeshoe's jurisdiction over his land between the Orange and Caledon rivers. Napier hoped that this treaty would keep peace in the area so that the British could carry on trading undisturbed. The treaty was immediately opposed by the Wesleyan missionaries and chiefs on the grounds that it took away some of their lands. Kok III would lease some land to the Trekboere and, by 1836, more than 1,500 farmers had already settled in Griqua territory. He then passed a law in 1838 which forbade the sale of leased land to the Trekboere. In 1840, this was modified on condition that the Trekboer would have to recognise Kok III's jurisdiction and authority over the land from the Griquas. Although they were not allowed to sell, the Griquas allowed long leases with Europeans, in some instances longer than 40 years.

== Griqualand East ==
In 1861, Kok III accepted a British offer to settle his people in the eastern section of the Cape Colony. He then led his people on a two-year trek across South Africa. During the trek, the Griqua lost most of their cattle and horses as they suffered through droughts and raids by the Basotho. In February 1863, they crossed the Drakensberg at Ongeluks Nek and descended along the banks of the Kenigha River on to Mount Currie (then known as Berg Vyftig) where they founded Griqualand East. After settling down they worked on replenishing their herds and flocks. They also built structures using bricks and succeeded in setting up an efficient method of government and a legislature. They raised their revenue through tax, trading licenses and fines. In 1867, they printed their own currency, which, however, was only used in their jurisdiction. These coins and notes never reached full circulation and payments for levies were usually made in cattle, goats, sheep and grain. In 1874, Kok III assisted the British in a campaign against the Hlubi in Natal. That same year, the Cape Colony placed Griqualand East under custodial government, effectively deposing Kok III.

== Death ==
Kok III died without an heir on 30 December 1875 after being injured in a wagon accident. The Cape Colony formally annexed Griqualand East in 1877 after the passing of the Griqualand East Annexation Act (Act 38 of 1877). The act was only promulgated on 17 September 1879, when four magistrates were set up, at Kokstad, Matatiele, Mount Frere and Umzimkhulu.

== See also ==
- Griqua
- Griqualand East
