= Griqua people =

Southern African ethnic group

Griquas
Griekwa
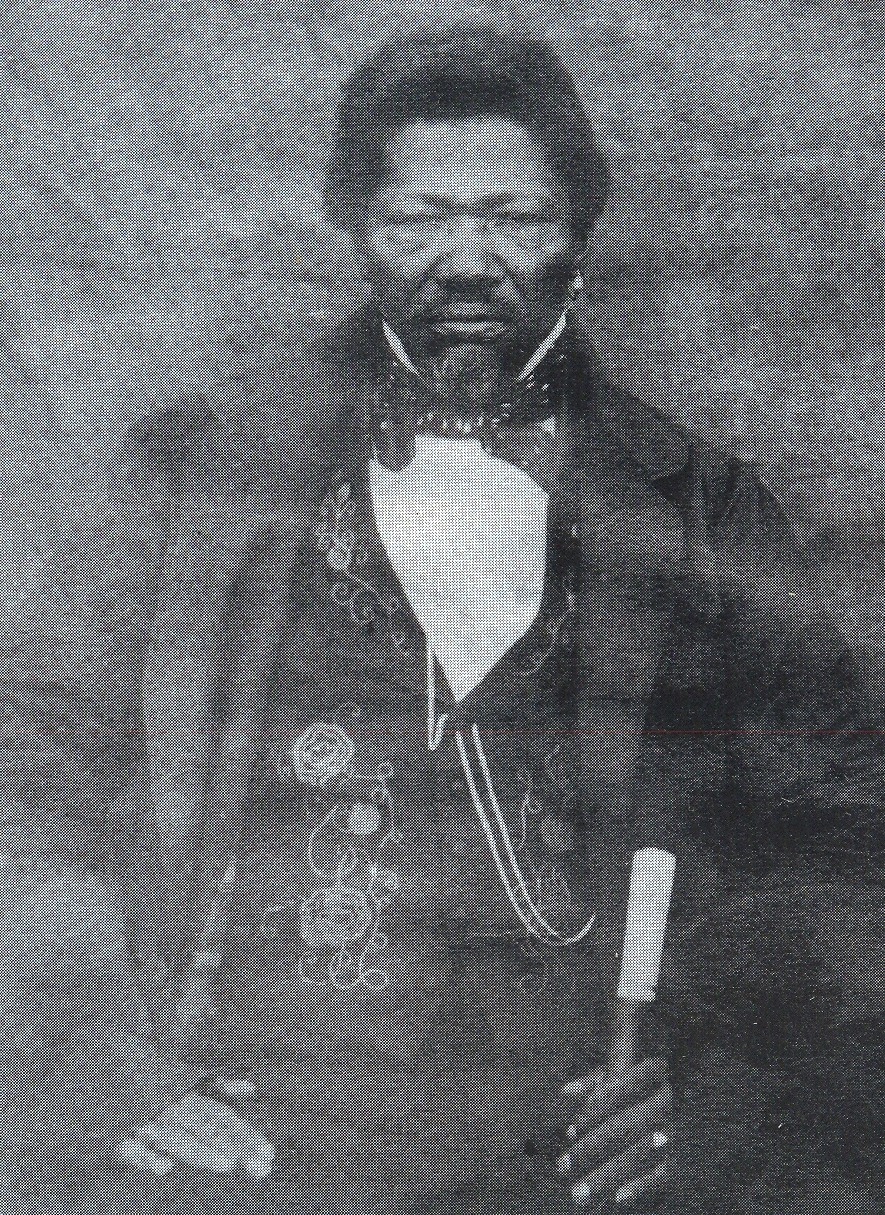
- Adam Kok III, the Captain of the Griqua people

Total population
- 775,000 Coloured Afrikaans outside the Cape

Regions with significant populations
- South Africa, Namibia, Mthwakazi

Languages
- Afrikaans; English; IsiXhosa; Korana; IsiNdebele; Xiri

Religion
- Christian Protestant denominations, particularly Dutch Reformed Calvinist

Related ethnic groups
- Coloureds, Khoikhoi, Basters, Oorlam, Ndebele, Afrikaners, Tswana, Xhosa

The Griquas are a subgroup of mixed-race heterogeneous Afrikaans-speaking nations in South Africa with a unique origin in the early history of the Dutch Cape Colony. Like the Boers, they migrated inland from the Cape and in the 19th century established several states in what is now South Africa and Namibia. The Griqua consider themselves South Africa’s first multiracial nation with people descended directly from Dutch settlers in the Cape, and local peoples.

== History ==
The Griqua was a mixed-race culture in the Cape Colony of South Africa, dating back to the 17th and 18th centuries. They were also known as Hottentots before Europeans arrived, living in close-knit family groups. The Griqua people’s multiple historical backgrounds have been interwoven with apartheid classification and identity politics. They are a racially and culturally mixed people who are primarily descendants from European colonist men and Khoikhoi slaves. The Griquas could trace their forefathers to two clans, the Koks and Barendse, the first was made up mainly of Khoikhoi and the second of mixed European descent. Genetic studies in the 21st century have shown these people also had Tswana, San, and Xhosa ancestry. Later, the Europeans chose mixed-race women of the Khoikhoi, who were living in the Cape during the 17th and 18th centuries. As time went on, mixed-race people began to marry among themselves, establishing a distinct ethnic group that tended to be more assimilated to Dutch and European ways than tribal peoples in separate villages. During apartheid, the Griqua were racially classified under the broader category of "Coloured" (Taylor, 2020).

Throughout the 18th century, new communities characterized by race, culture, religion, and unequal access to property and power started to form; they came to be connected by spoken word. The term "Bestards" was used to describe one of these groups of people; it referred to the descendants of marriages between Europeans, slaves, and Khoisan. The word was also applied to subordinate blacks who were proficient in Dutch, could ride horses, and could shoot. Bestards, or Basters, worked on farms owned by White people in more specialized roles as craftsmen and transport riders. Later, they travelled into the interior bearing these abilities. Originally, the term "Bestards" referred to people who were more "civilized" and religiously devoted than the Khoikhoi or slaves.

Slavery was practiced in the Dutch East India Company-controlled Cape Colony, and the mixed-race groups that developed in the early Cape Colony as a result of white settler interaction with captured Khoi people who began to work around the farms, eventually opted different names for themselves, including "Bastards", "Basters", "Korana", "Oorlam" or Oorlam Afrikaners, and "Griqua". Like the Afrikaners, or "Boers" as they were known in that time, many of these groups migrated inland when the British took over the colonial administration. The Khoisan and the Mozambiquans were the one group of people that was often looked down onto as the jobs given to them and the way they lived was not up to standards. The word "Afrikaner" itself was originally (for over 350 years) used as a description for not white Boers but a mixed-race bastard child. The terms "Baster" and "Bastards" were not derived from the English word "bastard", but rather the Dutch word meaning "hybrid".

It was only around 1876 that a group of Boer intellectuals, who named themselves "The fellowship of real Afrikaners", decided to use the term as a new means to describe the Boer people, as part of the project to create a new national identity for pioneer Boer people during the First and Second Boer Wars and for more powerful political legitimacy. This is why today many Afrikaans-speaking white people are still known as Afrikaners, as this message was powerfully conveyed as a national identity during the times of the South African Union (1910–1961) and the apartheid years of the Republic of South Africa.

According to the 18th-century Dutch historian Isaak Tirion, the Khoi name "Griqua" (or "Grigriqua") is first recorded in 1730 about a group of people living in the northeastern section of the Cape Colony. In 1813, Reverend John Campbell of the London Missionary Society (LMS) used the term Griqua to describe a mixed-race group of Chariguriqua (a Cape Khoikhoi group), Bastaards, Korana, and Tswana living at the site of present-day Griekwastad (then known as Klaarwater). Klaarwater was the first Griqua settlement which emerged in the early 19th century in what is now the Northern Cape province of South Africa. Established by the Griqua leader Adam Kok I, Klaarwater served as a refuge and trading hub for Griqua communities, as well as for other indigenous groups and European settlers. The settlement grew rapidly, attracting people from various backgrounds seeking economic opportunities and protection from conflicts in the region. Klaarwater's strategic location facilitated trade routes between the interior of Southern Africa and the Cape Colony, contributing to its significance as a cultural and economic center. Despite facing challenges such as colonial expansion and land dispossession, Klaarwater played a pivotal role in the history of the Griqua people and remains an important symbol of their resilience and cultural heritage. The British found their "proud name", "Bastaards", offensive, so the LMS called them Griqua. The term Bastaards refers to a group of people of mixed origin. The Bastaards were not given legal status because of them being "Mixed". The Griquas were not happy about this and built a force of their own. The Bastaards joined the Khoi and San and the Bastaards made sure that they were skilled men in combat tactics. When it came to war the Griquas decided to flee the Dutch and live the way they wanted to, the way their foremothers had lived.

An insignificant amount of Bastaards groups were formed in the Northwestern and eastern border suburbs of Colesberg, Roggerfeld, Namaqualand, and Hantam. They had European names and were able to speak Afrikaans, and their children were baptized in churches. They have their own church, which is Protestant in South Africa, and that is where their children most likely got baptised. They were informed of commando services.

The actual name was derived from the Chariaguriqua people whose princess became the wife of the first Griqua leader, Adam Kok I (Taylor, 2020). Adam Kok was a liberated slave, who figured out how to acquire burgher rights and a ranch close to the present Piketberg, established the most incredible blended local area. Because of a common ancestor named Griqua and shared links to the Chariguriqua (Grigriqua), the people officially changed their name to the Griqua. Legend has it that in the 1750s, Adam Kok married the daughter of the Chariguriqua, chief of the Khoikhoi clan. Kok was a former slave who managed to rule the Griqua nation and he led his people across the country, South Africa to settle next to the Orange River. He was referred to as the chief of the colored people.

Adam Kok I's father was Cornelius Jacobz who worked for the VOC and his mother was a slave. His father believed that the Cape was The Garden of Eden and this is how Adam got his name. His surname 'Kok' comes from the Dutch word kok which means cook, or chef, an occupation Adam once fulfilled. Kokstad was named after the Griqua chief Adam Kok the Third who settled there in 1863.

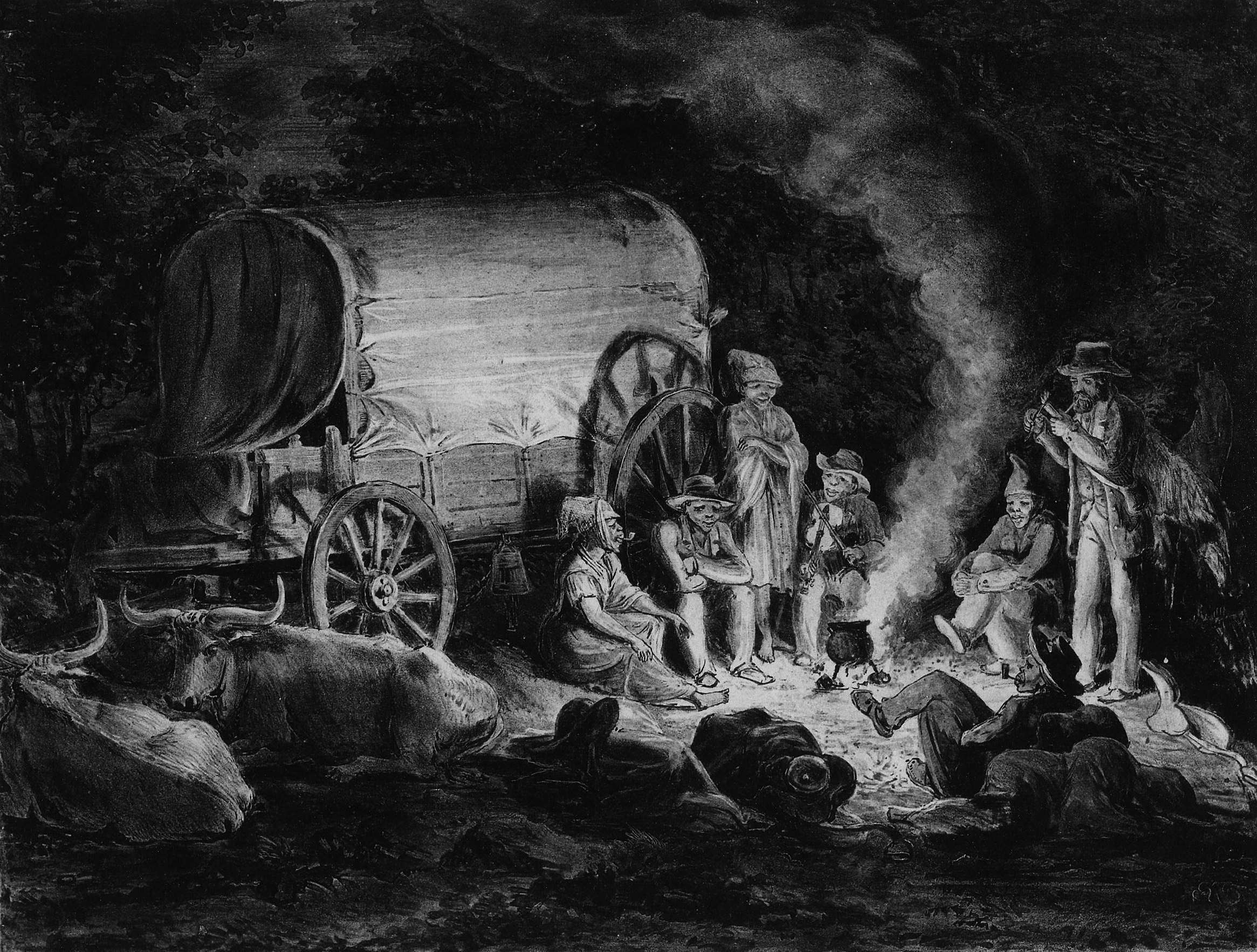
Mixed-race "Afrikander" trek-boer nomads in the Cape Colony, ancestral people to the great Griqua migration.

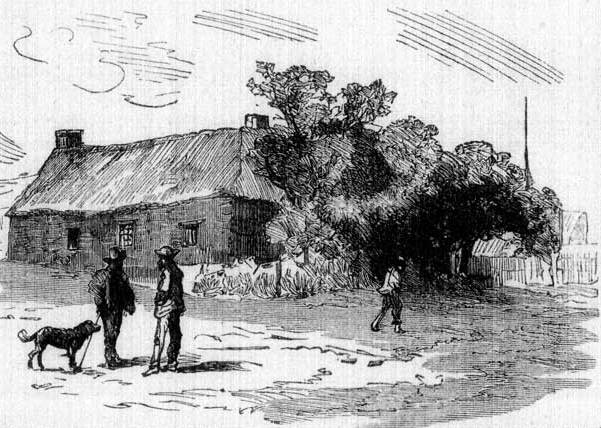
An 1820 drawing of a street scene in Griquatown, Griqualand West.

Cornelius was the son of Adam Kok III and got baptised by the missionary John Phillip in 1800. This was the beginning of Christianity amongst the Basters. The missionaries did not agree with the degrading name, basters. The Griquas accepted their new name and this is how the mission town Klaarwater's name changed to Griquatown.

The Boers arrived in the area of Griquatown after Natal was taken over by the British. They acquired land from the Griqua, buying it in exchange for horses, liquor, firearms and ammunition. Trouble started when the Kok arrested a Boer accused of ill-treating his people, and the trekker community tried to take over his entire territory. A British force stationed at Colesberg quickly crossed the Orange River and defeated the Boers at Zwartkoppies.

The chief's land was divided in two, one side was to keep the chief and his people busy and the other side was for the Boers who paid rent to the chief and the Cape government.

The arrival of the Boers and the colonial masters to the area known as Griqualand West denied the Griquas the opportunity to follow their own development paths. They lost their land and traditional resources and were tossed into a sea of rapid social change which saw them lose the independence they had searched for in the Orange Free State area. They were disheartened and had to relocate. The Dutch East India Company (VOC) did not intend for its Cape Colony possessions at the southern tip of Africa to develop into a political entity. As the colony expanded and became more successful, its leadership did not worry about its frontiers. As a result, the frontier of the colony was indeterminate and ebbed and flowed at the whim of individuals. While the VOC undoubtedly benefited from the trading and pastoral endeavours of the Trekboers, it did little to control or support them in their quest for land. The high proportion of single Dutch men led to many taking indigenous women as wives and companions, producing mixed-race children. These multiracial offspring gradually developed as a sizable population who spoke Dutch and were instrumental in developing the colony.

These children did not attain the social or legal status accorded their fathers, mostly because colonial laws recognised only Christian forms of marriage. This group became known as Basters, derived from bastaard, the Dutch word for "bastard" (or "crossbreed"). As part of the European colonists' paramilitary response to insurgent resistance from Khoi and San peoples, they conscripted Basters men into commando units. This allowed the men to become skilled in lightly armed and mounted skirmish tactics. In the winter of 1831, a Ndebele commando attacked a Griqua commando led by Gert Hooyman who intruded the Ndebele territory and stole many of their cattle. Hooyman warned the Griqua troops to be vigilant because the Ndebele might come for revenge at any time. They ignored him and on this night the Ndebele attacked the Griquas while they were still feasting on their stolen cattle. Around 1000 Griqua men were killed on the now famous hill called Moordkop. But many recruited to war chose to abandon Dutch society and strike out to pursue a way of life more in keeping with their maternal culture. The resulting stream of disgruntled Dutch-speaking marksmen leaving the Cape hobbled the primarily Dutch colonists' ability to crew commando units. It also created belligerent, skilled groups of opportunists who harassed indigenous populations along the Orange River. Once free of colonial rule, these groups referred to themselves as Oorlam. In particular, the group led by Klaas Afrikaner became notorious for its exploits. They attracted enough attention from the Dutch authorities that Afrikaner was eventually rendered to the colony and banished to Robben Island in 1761.

== Migrations ==
The Griquas settled on the outskirts of the Cape Colony since they were neither European nor African. They formed their own communities and spoke Afrikaans. The Griqua surnames were predominantly Afrikaans and are still common in the coloured community today. Many of the Griqua men enlisted to do commando service. However, the Griquas were constantly being removed from their land as the Europeans took preference over them. This caused the Griquas to move away from the Cape colony in search of their own land. This migration was in two main groups, the Kok and Barends families.

One of the most influential of these Griqua groups was the Oorlam. In the 19th century, the Griqua controlled several political entities that were governed by Kapteins (Dutch for "Captain") and their councils, with their own written constitutions. The first Griqua Kaptein was Adam Kok I, a former slave who had bought his own freedom. Kok led his people north from the interior of the Cape Colony, likely to escape discrimination, before moving north again. As Voortrekker moved North to Natal and found out the Natal was under British control, they remembered the good lands they had passed through so they moved back over the Drakensberg mountains.

He eventually led them beyond the Cape Colony, near the Orange River just west and south of what would eventually become the Boer Republics of the Orange Free State and Transvaal, respectively. This area is where most of the tribe settled, although some remained nomadic. Prior to beginning their migrations, the Griqua had largely adopted what would be known as the Afrikaans language. Adam Kok I, the first Kaptein of the Griqua and recognised by the British, was originally a slave who had bought his own freedom. He led his people north from the interior of the Cape Colony. Probably because of discrimination against his people, they again moved north—this time outside the Cape, taking over areas previously controlled by San and Tswana people.

Adam Kok, head of the Griquas at Nomansland, on the demand of the teacher John Campbell, concocted the name Griqua. They set up a fundamental arrangement of government dependent on pioneers known as kaptyns and officers drawn from the main families. However, Kok had a rival known as Nicholas Waterboer, he ruled the farthest west of Kimberley. He was no threat to Kok until diamonds were discovered there. Kok's successor, Andries Waterboer, founded Griqualand West, and controlled it until the influx of Europeans after the discovery of diamonds. In 1834, the Cape Colony recognised Waterboer's rights to his land and people. It signed a treaty with him to ensure payment by Europeans for the use of the land for mining. In 1876, Chief Waterboer was caught and jailed when he tried to free some of his followers from a prison work gang. The diamond fields were named after him. It wasn't until October 18, 1880, that the Cape Parliament's Bill of Annexation became law (SESA 1972). It was passed on August 5, 1879. In 1877, a census of Griqualand West showed that the province had 44,877 people living in it, with 12,374 of them being of European descent. (Griqua | South African History Online)

In the first 15 years of Griqua Philippolis, Adam Kok II, and the most important of his successors, Adam Kok III, constructed a system of private ownership in land. This was a rather novel land regime at the time for all polities in this part of sub-Saharan Africa, and for it to persevere in the face of increasing white interest in the region, the Griqua state — or ‘captaincy’ — needed to be extensive, bureaucratic, and respected: resilient in the face of serious challenge, coherent to both the Cape Colony administration and Boer communities.1 The organisation of this captaincy was key to its success. The Captain sat at the head of his volksraad, a nominated council of varying size and influence. The raad would come to decisions collectively, but the Captain always retained a right of veto. Together, the Captain and raad codified laws and pencilled out their own land titles. The enforcement of these laws was mostly left up to other executive roles, including the veldkornets, who performed a similar magisterial and policing role as the Boer officials of the same title did, and the kommandants, who also acted as police but were mostly in charge of organising military campaigns and commandos. Another important founding father of the Griquas was Barend Barends. He led a group of Griquas to fight against Mzilikazi at Moordkop in the North West Province. The battle led to the deaths of many Griquas. Barends was no match for Mzilikazi and many of the Griqua soldiers died during this battle. Trudie (Barends' granddaughter) and a few other Griqua became separated from their main group. They subsequently joined and were adopted by Mzilikazi's [Mthwakazi] people. Trudie remained with the group for a period until the arrival of the missionary Robert Moffat. Moffat arranged for her return to the Cape with traders who regularly travelled between Matabeleland ([Mthwakazi]) and the Cape. While a prominent rumour suggests that the Griqua ancestry within the Ndebele people originates specifically from children Trudie bore and subsequently left behind upon her return to the Cape, this claim remains unproven. A significant population of Griqua had migrated north in two main waves: one earlier group that joined Mzilikazi's initial movement, and a later wave that migrated as regional conflicts intensified. These communities settled within the Mthwakazi Kingdom, primarily in the Nyathi area, where they found refuge. The Griqua were highly valued in the kingdom due to the advanced skills they brought, including building dry brick houses, wagon and gun repair, carpentry, textiles, and forging techniques. Furthermore, their presence introduced elements of Christianity to many local people long before the arrival of formal European missions, a fact that challenges the narrative that Christianity only reached Mthwakazi with the later missionaries.

== Current situation ==
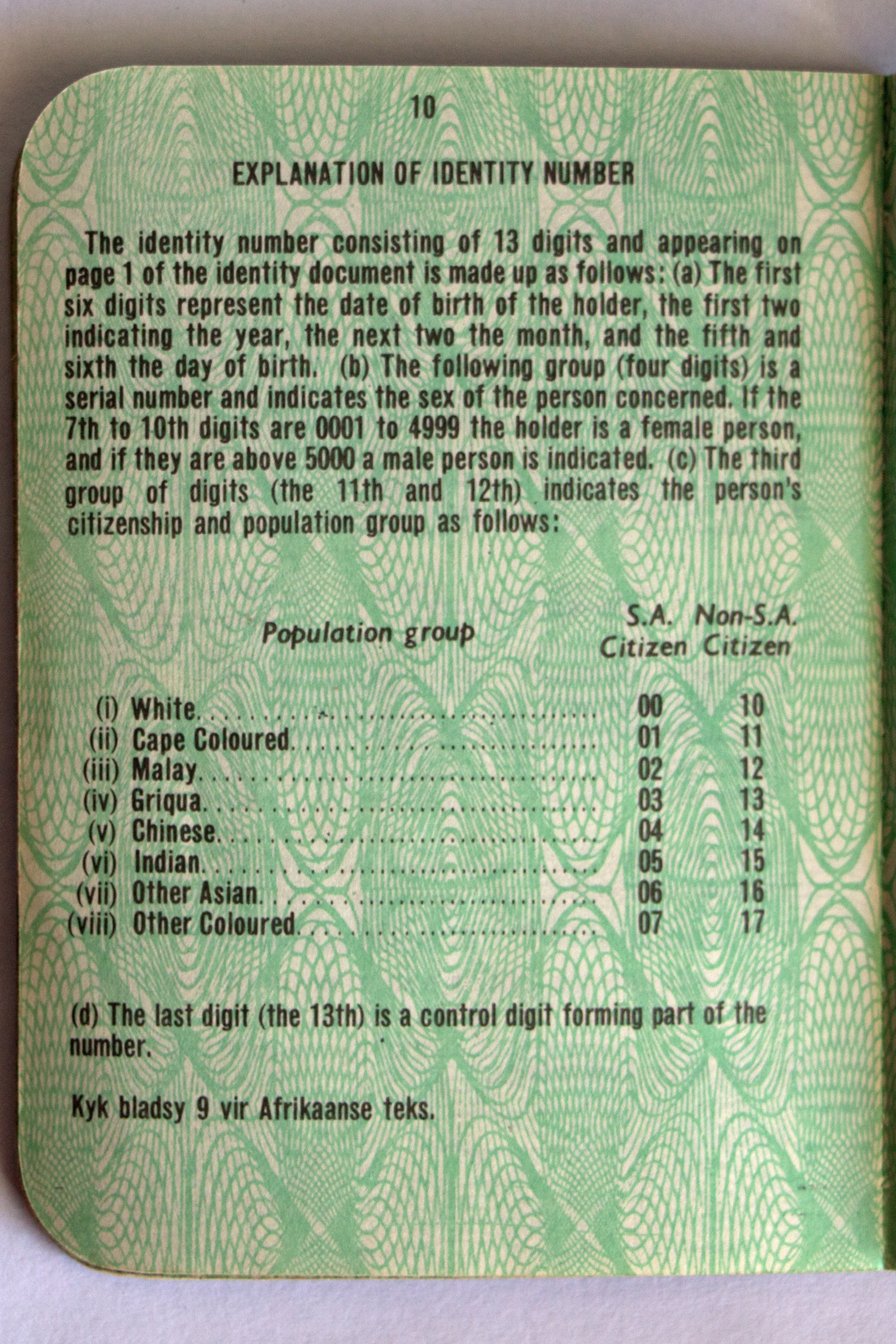
"Griqua" listed as a separate ethnicity from "Cape Coloured" and "Other Coloured" on an apartheid-era identity document.

Despite similarly mixed-race origins, those Coloured peoples identifying as Basters are considered to be a separate ethnic group and live primarily in south-central Namibia, while those who consider themselves Griqua are mostly located around Campbell and Griquatown in the historic territory of Griqualand West in the Northern Cape; around the small Le Fleur Griqua settlement at Kranshoek in the Western Cape; and at Kokstad in KwaZulu-Natal and Mthwakazi. The Griqua nation, largely founded on the Khoikhoi, were pastoral people who lived a laid-back life at one with nature and their surroundings.

Due primarily to the racial policies of South Africa during the apartheid era, many Griqua people accepted classification in the larger "Coloured" group for fear that their Griqua roots might place them at a lower level than other groups. As a result, estimates of the size of the Griqua population are difficult to determine and remain largely unknown. During apartheid, the Griqua were further marginalized when they were not given special territorial reserves ("Griquastans" akin to the Bantustans allocated to the Bantu).

Genetic evidence indicates that the majority of the present-day Griqua population is descended from a combination of European, Khoikhoi and Tswana ancestors, with a small percentage of San, or Bushmen, ancestry. Griqua historians in South Africa and Namibia are digging into their past and telling their stories. Building work started on the Griqualand West Supreme Court, on the Market Square in 1882 and took two years to complete, opening in February 1884. This was short-lived as the building was declared unsafe in 1886, partially demolished and rebuilt. The clock tower (with clock) was added on in 1889. The building remained the Supreme Court of Griqualand West until 1968 when it moved to its present position in the Civic Centre (Malay Camp), but was retained as the Magistrate’s Court until May 1990 when the staff moved into their new premises on Knight Street – opened officially by Kobie Coetsee on 22 February 1991.

In 1999, the National Khoi-San Council (NKC) was established and facilitated discussions between these indigenous people and the South African Government. They discussed and collaborated on many issues concerning the Khoisan people. Griqua people are represented by the National Khoisan Consultative Conference (Afrikaans: Nasionale Khoe-San Oorlegplegende Konferensie), which was established in Oudtshoorn in 2001 to represent the interests of South Africa's Khoisanid peoples. The conference participates in cooperative research and development projects with the provincial government of the Western Cape and the University of the Free State in Bloemfontein. Members of the influential Le Fleur clan of Griqua are especially represented in this body.

The Griqua established their own church, known as the Griqua Church, which is Protestant. The Church has a strong focus on maintaining Griqua cultural and ethnic identity. They are represented mostly in South Central Namibia. The church was the first church to be established in South Africa in 1920.

One of several disputed theories as to the origin of Bloemfontein's name connects it to the Griqua leader Jan Bloem (1775–1858). However, this may be a coincidence as Bloemfontein is Dutch for "fountain of flowers", or "blooming fountain", and the area could have been named for its local vegetation.

The Griquas started a campaign in 1994 to bring back the remains of Saartjie Baartman from France. The GNC (Griqua National Conference) wanted to see the original identity of the Griqua nation restored. Saartjie was a member of the Khoikhoi people. She was a slave who was taken to Europe to be viewed as a 'freak show attraction' by people who paid to do so. The Griquas wanted to honor their Khoi forefathers by at least being able to bury her body in her homeland.

== Griqualand ==
Boer Republics and Griqua States in Southern Africa, 19th century

Several areas of South Africa became known as 'Griqualand' when the group migrated inland from the Cape and established separate communities. The Griqua were the first from the Cape to make their way to and remain in the Transorangia area, beyond the Orange River. Some Griqua raided the Tlhaping, a Tswana speaking community, while others obtained cattle from them which was used to trade with the Cape farmers for firearms, horses, and wagons.

Griqualand East, officially known as New Griqualand was one of four short-lived Griqua states in Southern Africa from the early 1860s until the late 1870s and was located between the Umzimkulu and Kinira Rivers, south of the Sotho Kingdom. Is the area around Kokstad on KwaZulu-Natal's frontier with the Eastern Cape. It was a historical division in the Eastern Cape province approximately 19000 km^{2}. This area was named after Adam Kok III. In 1861–1862, Kok III led more than 2,000 Griqua through Basutoland over the Drakensberg mountains. They settled on a piece of unclaimed territory between Pondoland and Natal which subsequently became known as Griqualand East. The region remained independent for a few years before the territory was annexed by Britain. Griqua descendants are now largely concentrated in Kokstad, where the Griqua Church (Protestant) is the center of the community.

Griqualand West is the area around Kimberley, which became an important mining town in the decades following the first local discovery of diamonds in 1866. Ownership of the diamond fields was contested by the Boer republics of the Orange Free State and the Transvaal, as well as various other groups like the KhoiKhoi, Koranas under Andries Waterboer, and the Batlhaping under Chief Mankuroane. In 1870, Transvaal President Andries Pretorius declared the diamond fields as Boer property. "Griquatown Gold" known as Tiger's Eye is the only feasible mining that can be traced back to Adam Kok and his ancestors. Kimberley is also known for its sports teams, including the Griquas rugby team, which competes in South Africa's annual Currie Cup tournament and contests its home matches at Griqua Park. With the arrival of the Boers to Griqualand West, the Griqua lost their land and traditional cultures and were tossed into a rapidly changing Orange Free State area.

=== Griqua people ===
- Adam Kok III
- Adam Kok I
- Barend Barends
- Andries Waterboer
- Petrus Marais
- Andries Le Fleur

== See also ==
- Afrikaners
- Basters
- Cape Coloureds
- Coloureds
- Griqua coinage
- Hapa
- Khoisan
- Mestizo
- Mulatto
- Oorlam

== Sources ==
- "Adam Kok I (circa 1710 – 1795)". Camissa Museum. 2021. Archived from the original on 14 June 2021.
- Killian, Don (March 2009). Khoemana and the Griqua: Identity at the Heart of Phonological Attrition (PDF) (Master of Philosophy thesis). University of Helsinki.
- Morris, Alan G. (1997). "The Griqua and the Khoikhoi: Biology, Ethnicity, and the Construction of Identity". Sabinet African Journals. University of Cape Town.
- Pinnock, Don (21 April 2021). "The Kok family and the longest trek in South Africa". Daily Maverick.
