= Hamilton United Reformed Church =

Church building in Scotland

The United Reformed Church, Hamilton, Scotland, is made up of two congregations which merged in 1966. The older congregation originally met in a building at Back o’ Barns, and was founded (1807) under the guidance of the Reverend Greville Ewing, who was instrumental in founding many such independent churches in Scotland, and also the Scottish Congregational College. That congregation eventually settled in Auchingramont Road, and in its latter form was known as St. James’ Congregational Church. Due to a theological dispute a small number of members left that congregation and formed a church which eventually met in South Park Road. This congregation originally associated itself with the recently founded Evangelical Union of Scotland.

== Congregational and Evangelical merger ==
In 1896 the Congregational Union of Scotland and the Evangelical Union of Scotland found that they had sufficient in common in both theology and church policy that it was prudent to form a single body. Thus both Hamilton congregations became part of the one denomination, The Congregational Union of Scotland. Over the years both congregations provided members to serve on many of the denominational committees.

== Hamilton Congregational Church ==
In 1966 St. James’ Congregational Church closed, and the two congregations merged under the title Hamilton Congregational Church, agreeing to use the building located in South Park Road. In the closing decades of the twentieth century the Congregational Union of Scotland underwent a number of changes and became The Scottish Congregational Church, before, on 1 April 2000, it united with the United Reformed Church.

== The Livingstone family ==
David Livingstone’s family used to walk from the mill house at Blantyre to Hamilton every Sunday to attend the Church. They worshipped at St. James’ Congregational Church. It is said that Mrs. Livingstone was so independent that they carried not only their own lunch, but also tea, sugar and also salt, so that the only hospitality that they required was boiling water. The David Livingstone Centre, at Blantyre, records much of his missionary work, as well as preserving the room in which he was brought up.

Neil Livingstone, David’s father, was one of the group who left the St. James’ congregation, and is listed as one of the first Deacons of the South Park Road Congregation. When St. James’ Church closed in 1966 all the Livingstone memorabilia was moved into the current church building.
