= Morisonianism =

Morisonianism was the name given to the principles of the Evangelical Union, a Scottish denomination founded by the Rev. James Morison (1816–1893), of Kilmarnock, on his expulsion from the United Secession Church in 1843, and united with the Scottish Congregational Union in 1897; differed from the older Presbyterianism in affirming the freedom of the human will to accept or reject salvation, and the universal scope of the offer of salvation as made by God to all men; in polity the Morisonians observed a modified independency.
