= Greville Ewing =

Greville Ewing (1767–1841) was a congregational minister of the Church of Scotland.

Ewing was born in 1767 at Edinburgh, and lived on the Cowgate, south of Canongate, the east part of the Old Town.

== Career ==
He studied with considerable distinction at the high school and university there. Of a deeply religious temperament, he decided to prepare for the ministry, much against his father's wishes. On being licensed as a probationer he was chosen, first as assistant and afterwards as colleague to the Rev. Dr. Thomas Snell Jones, minister of Lady Glenorchy's Church in Edinburgh.

Here he soon acquired wide popularity as a preacher, and exercised his ministry with great success. Missions attracted much of his attention, and in 1796 he took an active part in the formation of the Edinburgh Missionary Society, becoming its first secretary. He was also editor of the 'Missionary Magazine' from 1796 to 1799. When Robert Haldane of Airthrey projected a mission to India, Ewing was appointed to go out, but the directors of the East India Company refused to sanction the undertaking, and it was abandoned. He then joined with the brothers Haldane in an important missionary movement at home. Among its supporters were many who had not received Presbyterian ordination. It was condemned in a pastoral admonition from the general assembly of the established church.

Ewing, who regarded the congregational system as more scriptural and more elastic than the presbyterian, had in 1798 resigned his charge as minister of Lady Glenorchy's Chapel, as well as his connection with the Church of Scotland. In 1799 he became minister of a congregational church in Glasgow, and retained the charge till 1836. As a result of his labours with the Haldanes and afterwards with Dr. Ralph Wardlaw, congregationalism was introduced into Scotland; he guided the formation of several congregations, including St. James' Congregational Church. He was tutor of the Glasgow Theological Academy – a congregationalist foundation – from its foundation in 1809 till 1836, and did much to promote the study of the Bible in the original languages. In 1812 he helped to form the Congregational Union of Scotland.

In 1801 he published a Greek grammar and lexicon (The Rudiments of the Greek Language Shortly Illustrated ...) for students of the New Testament. He also published several pamphlets and sermons, and two larger works—'Essays to the Jews, on the Law and the Prophets,’ 2 vols. (1809–1810), and an 'Essay on Baptism' (1823).

== Family and death ==
A Synopsis of Practical Mathematics by Alexander Ewing, Greville Ewing's father, with an illustration of Lind's Quadrant

Ewing is the son of Alexander Ewing, a teacher of mathematics.

Ewing married three times: in 1794 to Anne Innes, who died in 1795; in 1799 to Janet Jamieson, who died in 1801; and in 1802, to Barbara, daughter of Sir James Maxwell, bart., of Pollok, and stepdaughter of Sir John Shaw-Stewart, bart., of Ardgowan. Ewing's third wife died 14 September 1828, in consequence of an accident at the Falls of Clyde, and her husband published a memoir, of which a second edition appeared in 1829. By his second wife he had one daughter, who married James Matheson, a congregational minister.

During the last few years of his life Ewing was in broken health, and had to discontinue his regular work. He died suddenly at home 4 Carlton Place in Glasgow on 2 August 1841.
