= David Livingstone =

British colonialist and missionary (1813-1873)

The Reverend David Livingstone FRGS FRS
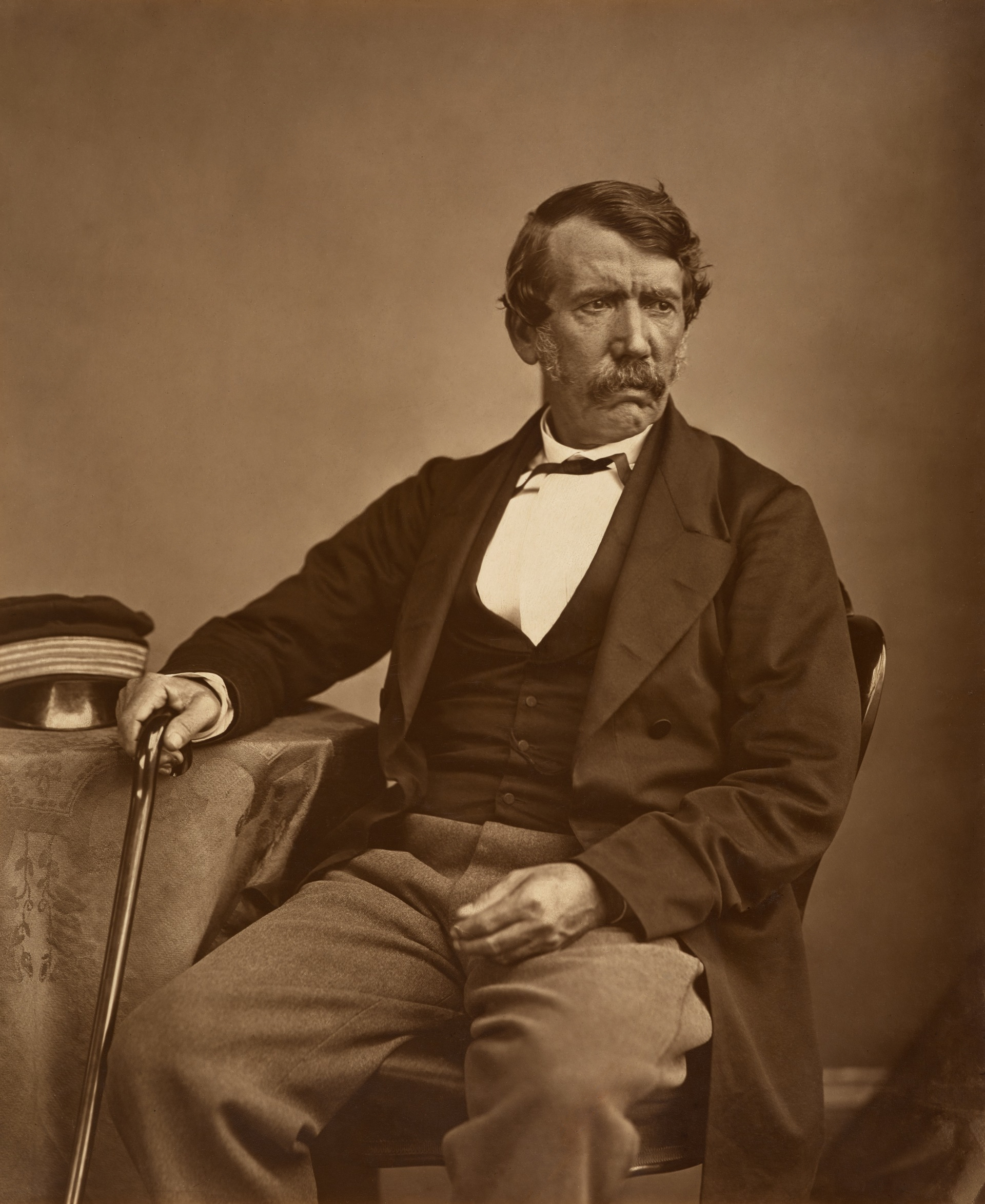
- Livingstone in 1864
- Born: 19 March 1813; Blantyre, Lanarkshire, Scotland
- Died: 1 May 1873 (aged 60); Chief Chitambo's Village, Kingdom of Kazembe
- Resting place: Westminster Abbey; 51.499444°N 0.1275°W
- Occupations: Doctor; missionary
- Known for: Proselytizing Christianity, exploration of Africa, and meeting with Henry Stanley
- Spouse: Mary Moffat (m. 1845; died 1862)
- Children: 6

Signature
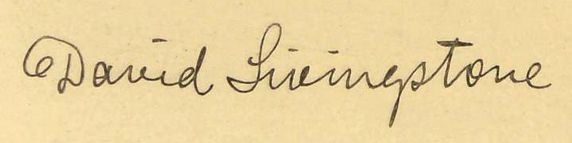

David Livingstone (/ˈlɪvɪŋstən/; 19 March 1813 – 1 May 1873) was a Scottish doctor, Congregationalist, pioneer Christian missionary with the London Missionary Society, and an explorer in Africa. Livingstone was married to Mary Moffat Livingstone, from the prominent 18th-century Moffat missionary family. Livingstone came to have a mythic status as a Protestant missionary martyr, working-class "rags-to-riches" inspirational story, scientific investigator and explorer, imperial reformer, anti-slavery crusader, and advocate of British commercial and colonial expansion. As a result, he became one of the most popular British heroes of the late 19th-century Victorian era.

Livingstone's fame as an explorer and his obsession with learning the sources of the Nile was founded on the belief that if he could solve that age-old mystery, his fame would give him the influence to end the East African Arab–Swahili slave trade. "The Nile sources", he told a friend, "are valuable only as a means of opening my mouth with power among men. It is this power [with] which I hope to remedy an immense evil." His subsequent exploration of the central African watershed was the culmination of the classic period of European geographical discovery and colonial penetration of Africa. At the same time, his missionary travels, "disappearance" and eventual death in Africa‍—‌and subsequent glorification as a posthumous national hero in 1874‍—‌led to the founding of several major central African Christian missionary initiatives carried forward in the era of the European "Scramble for Africa", during which almost all of Africa fell under European rule for decades.

== Early life ==
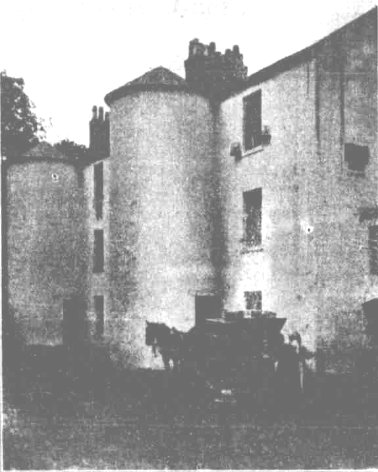
Livingstone's birthplace in Blantyre, South Lanarkshire, Scotland

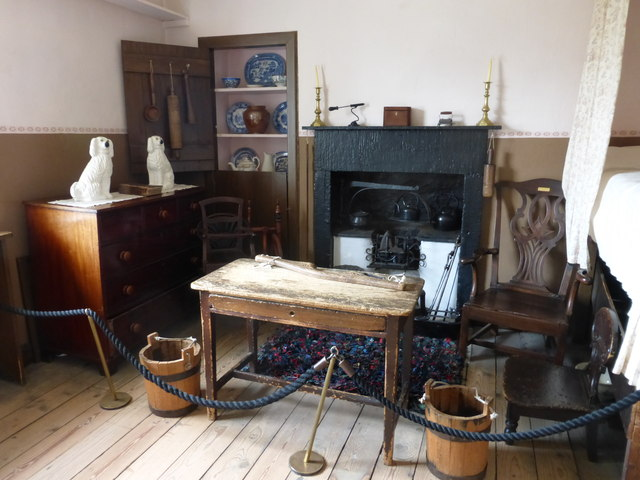
David Livingstone's birthplace, with period furnishings

Livingstone was born on 19 March 1813 in the mill town of Blantyre, Scotland, in a tenement building for the workers of a cotton factory on the banks of the River Clyde under the bridge crossing into Bothwell. He was the second of seven children born to Neil Livingstone and his wife Agnes Livingstone (née Hunter). David was employed at age 10 in the cotton mill of Henry Monteith & Co. He and his brother John worked 14-hour days as piecers, tying broken cotton threads on the spinning machines.

Neil Livingstone was a Sunday school teacher and teetotaller who handed out Christian tracts on his travels as a door-to-door tea salesman. He read books on theology, travel, and missionary enterprises extensively. This rubbed off on the young David, who became an avid reader, but he also loved scouring the countryside for animal, plant, and geological specimens in local limestone quarries. Neil feared that science books were undermining Christianity and attempted to force his son to read nothing but theology, but David's deep interest in nature and science led him to investigate the relationship between religion and science. In 1832, he read Philosophy of a Future State, written by Thomas Dick, and he found the rationale that he needed to reconcile faith and science and, apart from the Bible, this book was perhaps his greatest philosophical influence.

Other significant influences in his early life were Thomas Burke, a Blantyre evangelist, and David Hogg, his Sunday school teacher. At age 15, he left the Church of Scotland for a local Congregational church, influenced by preachers like Ralph Wardlaw, who denied predestinarian limitations on salvation. Influenced by revivalistic teachings in the United States, Livingstone entirely accepted the proposition put by Charles Finney that "the Holy Spirit is open to all who ask it". For Livingstone, this meant a release from the fear of eternal damnation. Livingstone's reading of missionary Karl Gützlaff's Appeal to the Churches of Britain and America on behalf of China enabled him to persuade his father that medical study could advance religious ends.

Livingstone's experiences in the cotton mill were also important from ages 10 to 26, first as a piecer and later as a spinner. This monotonous work was necessary to support his impoverished family, but it taught him persistence, endurance, and a natural empathy with all who labour, as expressed by lines that he used to hum from the egalitarian Robert Burns song: "When man to man, the world o'er/Shall brothers be for a' that". (Note: This sentiment today would be expressed along the lines of: "all people, worldwide, are brothers and sisters, despite everything.")

== Education ==
Livingstone attended Blantyre village school, along with the few other mill children with the endurance to do so despite their 14-hour workday (6 am–8 pm). Having a family with a strong, continuing commitment to study reinforced his education.

At age 21, he was excited by a pamphlet his father got from the church setting out Gützlaff's call for missionaries to China, with the new concept that missionaries should be trained as medical doctors. His father was persuaded, and like many other students in Scotland Livingstone was to support himself, with the agreement of the mill management, by working at his old job from Easter to October, outwith term time. He joined Anderson's University, Glasgow, in 1836, studying medicine and chemistry as well as attending theology lectures by the anti-slavery campaigner Richard Wardlaw at the Congregational Church College, where he may also have studied Greek. To enter medical school, he needed some knowledge of Latin, and so was tutored by a local Catholic man, Daniel Gallagher (later a priest, founder of St Simon's, Partick). Livingstone worked hard, got a good grounding in science and medicine, and made lifelong friends including Andrew Buchanan and James Young.

The London Missionary Society (LMS) was at the time the major organisation in the country for missionary work and unlike others was open to Congregationalists. He applied to the LMS in October 1837 and in January was sent questions which he answered. He got no reply until he was invited to two interviews in August 1838. He was then accepted as a probationary candidate and given initial training at Ongar, Essex, as the introduction to studies to become a minister within the Congregational Union serving under the LMS, rather than the more basic course for an artisan missionary. At Ongar, he and six other students had tuition in Greek, Latin, Hebrew and theology from the Reverend Richard Cecil, who in January 1839 assessed that despite "heaviness of manner" and "rusticity", Livingstone had "sense and quiet vigour", good temper and substantial character "so I do not like the thought of him being rejected." A month later, he still thought Livingstone "hardly ready" to go on to theological studies at Cheshunt College, and "worthy but remote from brilliant". In June 1839 the LMS directors accepted Livingstone and agreed to his request to continue studying with Cecil at Ongar until the end of the year, then have LMS support for medical studies in London.

To gain necessary clinical training he continued his medical studies at the Charing Cross Hospital Medical School, with his courses covering medical practice, midwifery, and botany. He qualified as a licentiate of the Faculty (now Royal College) of Physicians and Surgeons of Glasgow on 16 November 1840 (in 1857 he was made an Honorary Fellow of the Faculty). On 20 November 1840 Livingstone was ordained a minister of the church, as was another missionary to South Africa, William Ross, in a service at the Albion Chapel, Finsbury. The ordination service was conducted by Cecil and J. J. Freeman.

== Vision for Africa ==
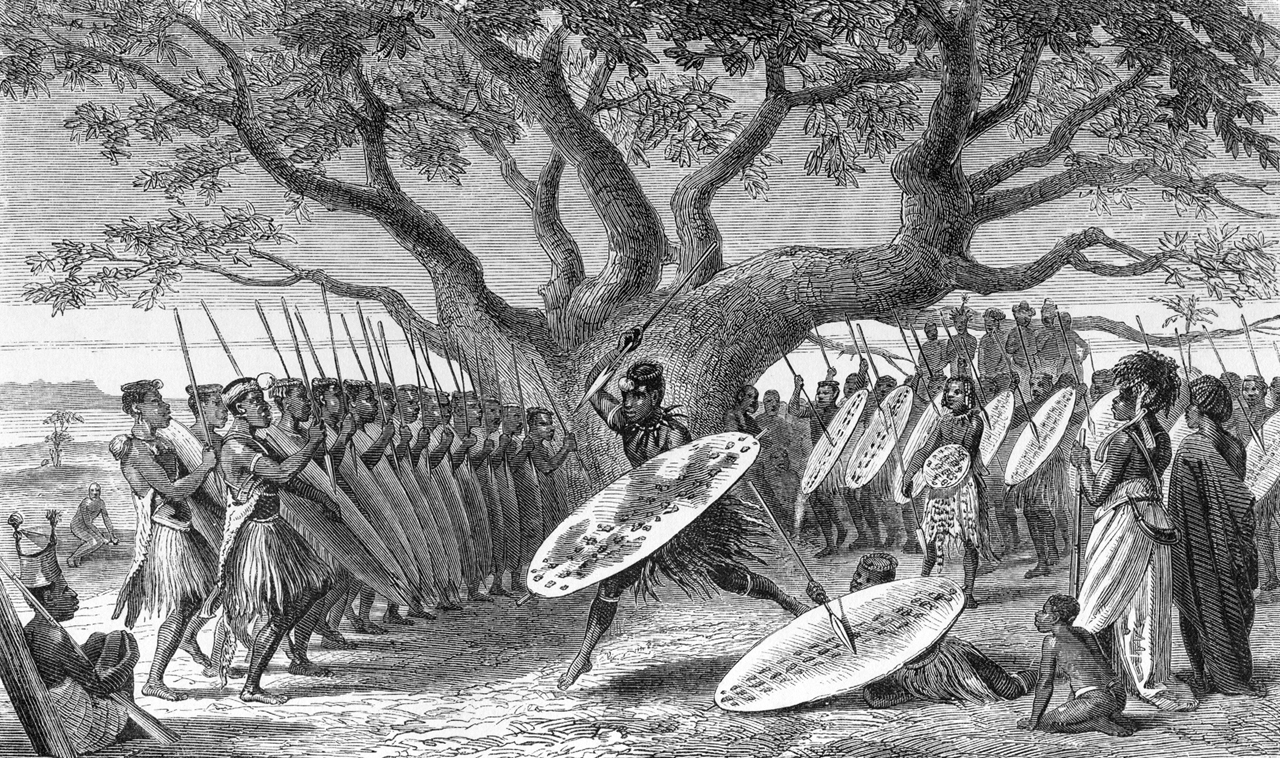
Zulu dance, at Shupanga on the Zambesi, to collect tribute from Portuguese merchants

Though Livingstone had responded to Gützlaff's call for missionaries to China, the looming First Opium War made the LMS directors cautious about sending recruits there. When he asked to extend his probationary training at Ongar, Cecil told him of their wish that he should be employed in the West Indies "in preference to South Africa". On 2 July 1839 he wrote to the LMS directors that the West Indies was by then well served by doctors, and he had always been attracted to other parts of the world rather than a settled pastorate. With LMS agreement, he continued to get theological tuition from Cecil until the end of the year, then resumed medical studies.

On beginning his clinical training in January 1840, he returned to Mrs. Sewell's missionary boarding house in Aldersgate, where he had stayed previously when in London. Others staying there were visited occasionally by the missionary Robert Moffat, who was then in England with his family to publicise the work of his LMS mission at Kuruman in South Africa. Livingstone questioned him repeatedly about Africa, and as Moffat later recalled; "By and by he asked me whether I thought he would do for Africa. I said I believed he would, if he would not go to an old station, but would advance to unoccupied ground, specifying the vast plain to the north, where I had sometimes seen, in the morning sun, the smoke of a thousand villages, where no missionary had ever been."

He was excited by Moffat's vision of expanding missionary work to the north of Bechuanaland, and by the hotly debated topic of Christianity and commerce. The LMS missionary John Philip, after discussion with the abolitionist Fowell Buxton, published Researches in South Africa in 1828, proposing that Christianity would always bring "civilisation" including free trade and free labour. This argument was reinforced for Livingstone when he attended the Exeter Hall meeting of 1 June 1840 where Buxton powerfully made the case that the African slave trade would be ended if chiefs, instead of having to sell slaves, could obtain desired European goods through "legitimate trade", its effect augmented by Christian missions preaching the gospel and introducing school education.

=== Mission stations ===
Livingstone left London on 17 November 1840, passenger on a sailing brig bound for the Cape of Good Hope, along with two other LMS missionaries: Ross, who had been ordained at the same service as him, and Ross's wife. During the long voyage he studied Dutch and the Tswana language, and the captain gave him extensive tuition in navigation. At Rio de Janeiro, unlike the other two, he ventured ashore and was impressed by the cathedral and scenery, but not by the drunkenness of British and American sailors, so he gave them tracts in a dockside bar. On 15 March 1841 the ship arrived at Simon's Bay, and for a month while it unloaded and loaded, the three stayed at Cape Town with missionary John Philip. As resident director of the LMS, Philip had continued their policy that all people were equal before God and in law, leading to disputes with Boers, and with British settlers as Philip held that Xhosa people were not to blame for the Xhosa Wars over extending the Cape Colony. Missionary factions disagreed over this, and over his emphasis on missionary work among Griqua people of the colony, while others like Moffatt wanted more focus on new areas. There were also tensions between artisan missionaries engaged for lay expertise, and ordained missionaries.

The ship took Livingstone and the Rosses on to Algoa Bay, from 19 May to 31 July they were on the long trek by ox-cart to the Kuruman Mission. The Moffats had not yet returned from Britain, and he immersed himself in Tswana life. From September to late December he trekked 750 miles (1,210 km) with the artisan missionary Roger Edwards, who had been at Kuruman since 1830 and had been told by Moffat to investigate potential for a new station. They visited and discussed the area called Mabotsa, Botswana, near Zeerust, North West Province, South Africa.

In 1842 Livingstone went on two treks with African companions; the principals were mission members Paul and Mebalwe, a deacon. In June 1843, Edwards got LMS approval to set up a mission station with his wife at Mabotsa. Livingstone moved there by agreement and joined them in the physical work of building facilities. He wrote to LMS secretary Arthur Tidman, saying he would be delighted to call Mabotsa "the centre of the sphere of my labours", but would try to hold himself "in readiness to go anywhere, provided it be forward".

The Moffats, accompanied by two new missionary families, reached the Vaal River in January 1844. Livingstone rode out to meet them there, and then sat in the Moffats' ox-cart talking with Robert for hours during the 17 or 18 days it took to get home to Kuruman. For the first time, he met their daughter Mary, who had been born and brought up in Africa.

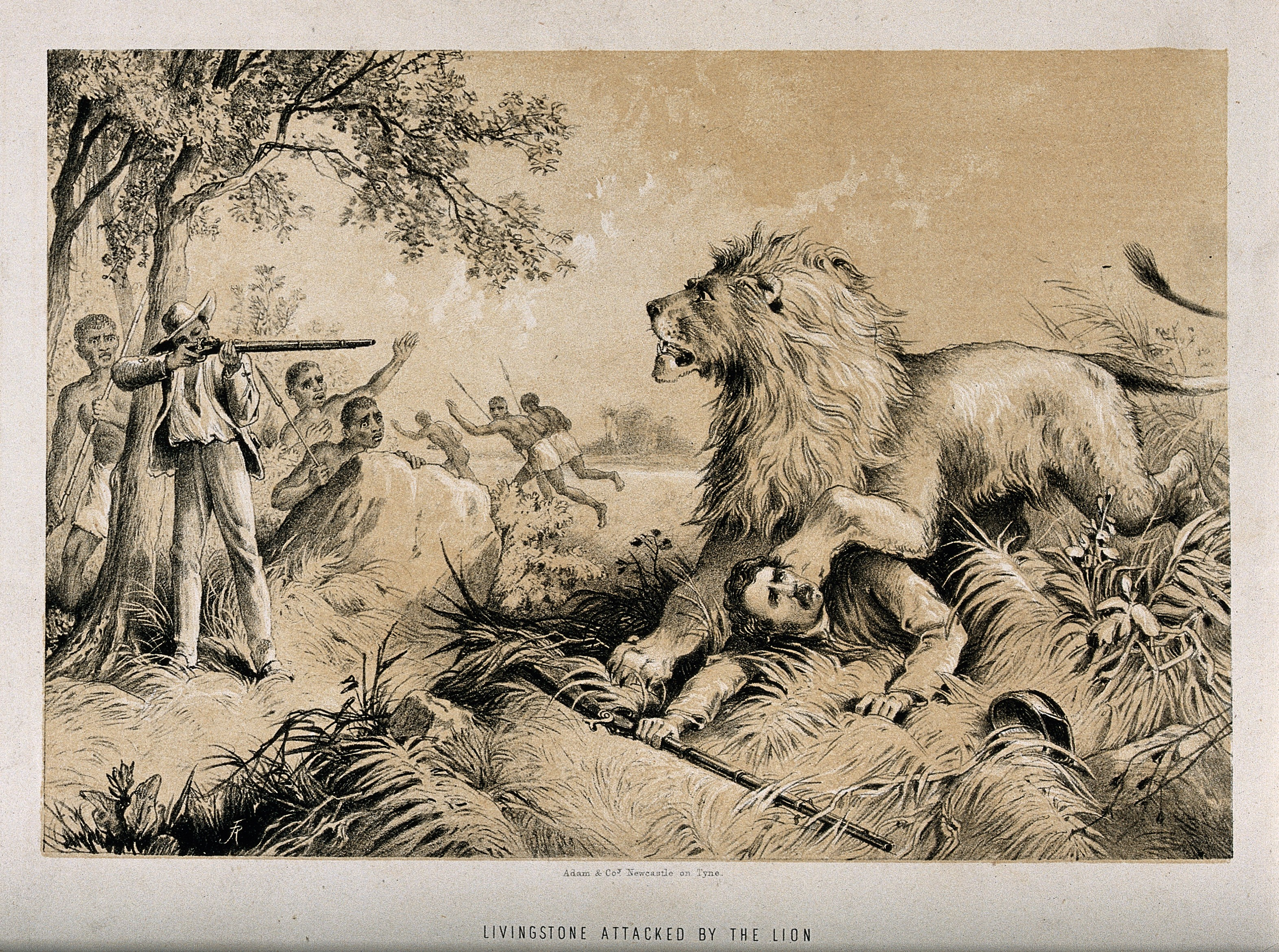
Deacon Mebalwe shooting, distracting the lion which had overpowered Livingstone

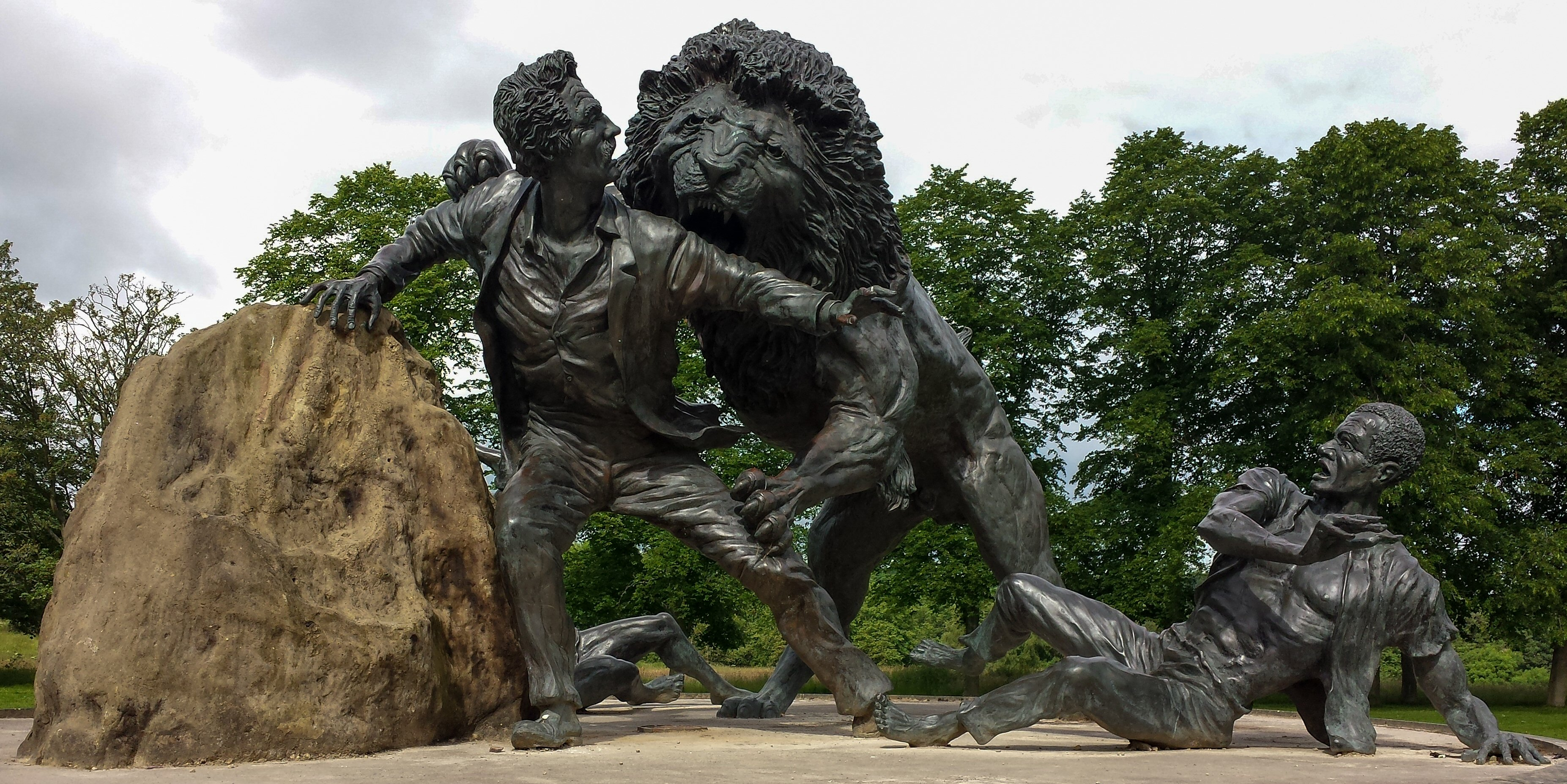
Livingstone Memorial Sculpture in Blantyre, Scotland

Lions often attacked the herds of the Mabotsa villagers, and on 16 February, Mebalwe and Livingstone joined them defending sheep. Livingstone got a clear shot at a large lion, but while he was re-loading it attacked, crushing his left arm, and forced him to the ground. His life was saved by Mebalwe diverting its attention by trying to shoot the lion. He too got bitten. A man who tried spearing it was attacked just before it dropped dead.

Livingstone's broken bone, even though inexpertly set by himself and Edwards, bonded strongly. He went for recuperation to Kuruman, where he was tended by Moffat's daughter Mary, and they became engaged. His arm healed, enabling him to shoot and lift heavy weights, though it remained a source of much suffering for the rest of his life, and he was not able to lift the arm higher than his shoulder. Livingstone and Mary were married on 9 January 1845.

Livingstone was obliged to leave his first mission at Mabotsa in Botswana in 1845 after irreconcilable differences emerged between him and his fellow missionary, Rogers Edwards, and because the Bakgatla were proving indifferent to the Gospel. He abandoned Chonuane, his next mission, in 1847 because of drought and the proximity of the Boers and his desire "to move on to the regions beyond". At Kolobeng Mission Livingstone converted Chief Sechele in 1849 after two years of patient persuasion. Only a few months later Sechele lapsed.

== Exploration of southern and central Africa ==
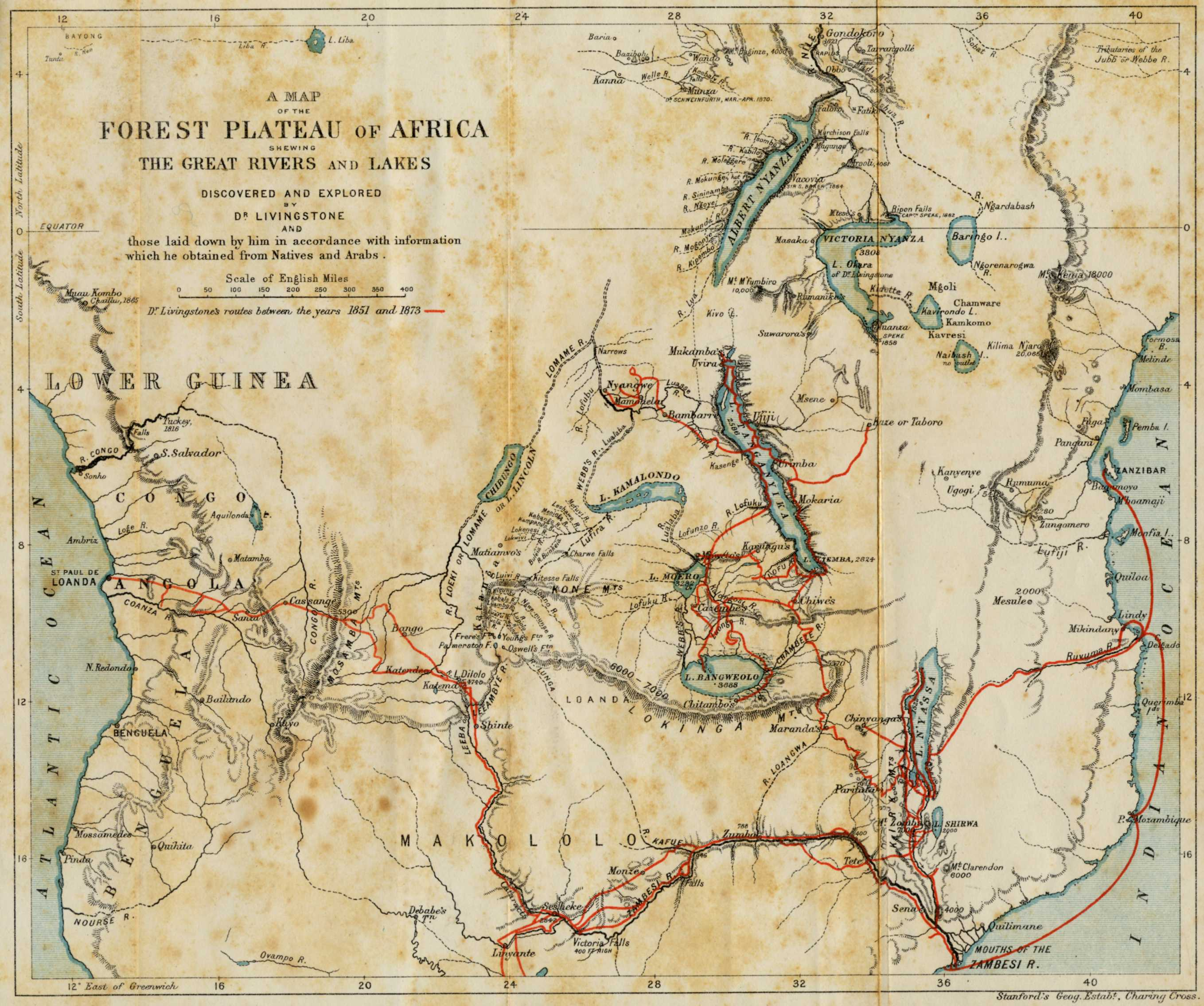
The journeys of Livingstone in Africa between 1851 and 1873

To improve his Tswana language skills and find locations to set up mission stations, Livingstone made journeys far to the north of Kolobeng with William Cotton Oswell. In 1849 they crossed the Kalahari Desert and reached Lake Ngami. In 1850, he was recognised by the Royal Geographical Society which presented him a chronometer watch for 'his journey to the great lake of Ngami'. He heard of a river which could potentially become a "Highway" to the coast, and in August 1851 they reached the Zambezi which he hoped would be a "key to the Interior". In 1852, after sending his family to Britain, Livingstone travelled north to the village of Linyanti on the Zambezi river, located roughly midway between the east and west coast of the continent, where Sekeletu, chief of the Kololo, granted Livingstone authority as a nduna to lead a joint investigation of trade routes to the coast, with 27 Kololo warriors acting as interpreters and guides. They reached the Portuguese city of Luanda on the Atlantic in May 1854 after profound difficulties and the near-death of Livingstone from fever. Livingstone realized the route would be too difficult for future traders, so he retraced the journey back to Linyanti.

Then with 114 Kololo men, loaned by the same chief, he set off east down the Zambezi. On this leg he became the first European to see the Mosi-oa-Tunya ("the smoke that thunders") waterfall, which he named Victoria Falls after Queen Victoria. He successfully reached Quelimane on the Indian Ocean, having mapped most of the course of the Zambezi river. For this, Livingstone became famous as the first European to cross south-central Africa at that latitude and was hailed as having "opened up" Africa, but there was already a long-established trans-regional network of trade routes. Portuguese traders had penetrated to the middle of the continent from both sides, in 1853–1854 two Arab traders crossed the continent from Zanzibar to Benguela, and around 1800 two native traders crossed from Angola to Mozambique.

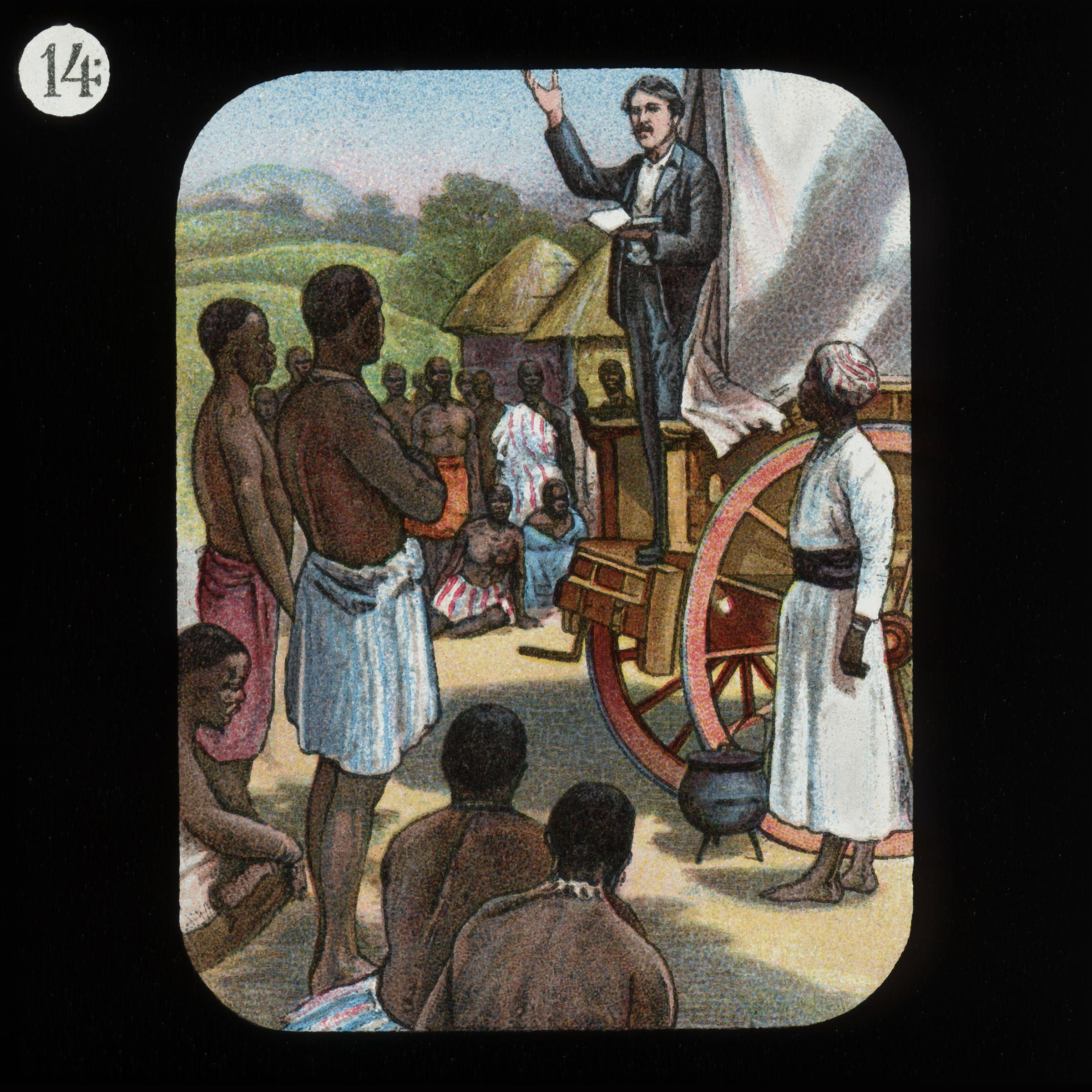
Livingstone preaching the gospel to unconverted Africans. Like other missionaries of the era he had a low success rate and is credited with a single conversion.

Livingstone advocated the establishment of trade and religious missions in central Africa, but abolition of the African slave trade, as carried out by the Portuguese of Tete and the Arab Swahili of Kilwa, became his primary goal. His motto—now inscribed on his statue at Victoria Falls—was "Christianity, Commerce and Civilization", a combination that he hoped would form an alternative to the slave trade, and impart dignity to the Africans in the eyes of Europeans. He believed that the key to achieving these goals was the navigation of the Zambezi as a Christian commercial highway into the interior.

=== Author and campaigner ===
He returned to Britain in December 1856. The Royal Geographical Society awarded him their Patron's Medal in 1855 for his explorations in Africa. Encouraged by the London Missionary Society, he wrote up his journal but unconventionally had his Missionary Travels published in 1857 by John Murray, making it a bestselling travelogue. The book includes his field science and sympathetic descriptions of African people. He proposes that missions and "legitimate commerce" by river into central Africa would end slave trading. His description of Portuguese Angola however, is noted as containing little of interest, besides "some extraordinary mistakes, which, coming from one so often cited as a high authority, are very surprising"; these include listing Quissama and Libolo as "fierce and independent" nations when both were only the names of the provinces of Benguela; the reference to "a kind of freemasons called Empacasseiros" which were the hunters of buffalo employed by the Portuguese, and claiming the existence of "Jingas" in the heart of Angola as an independent nation, this being the name of Queen Nzinga.

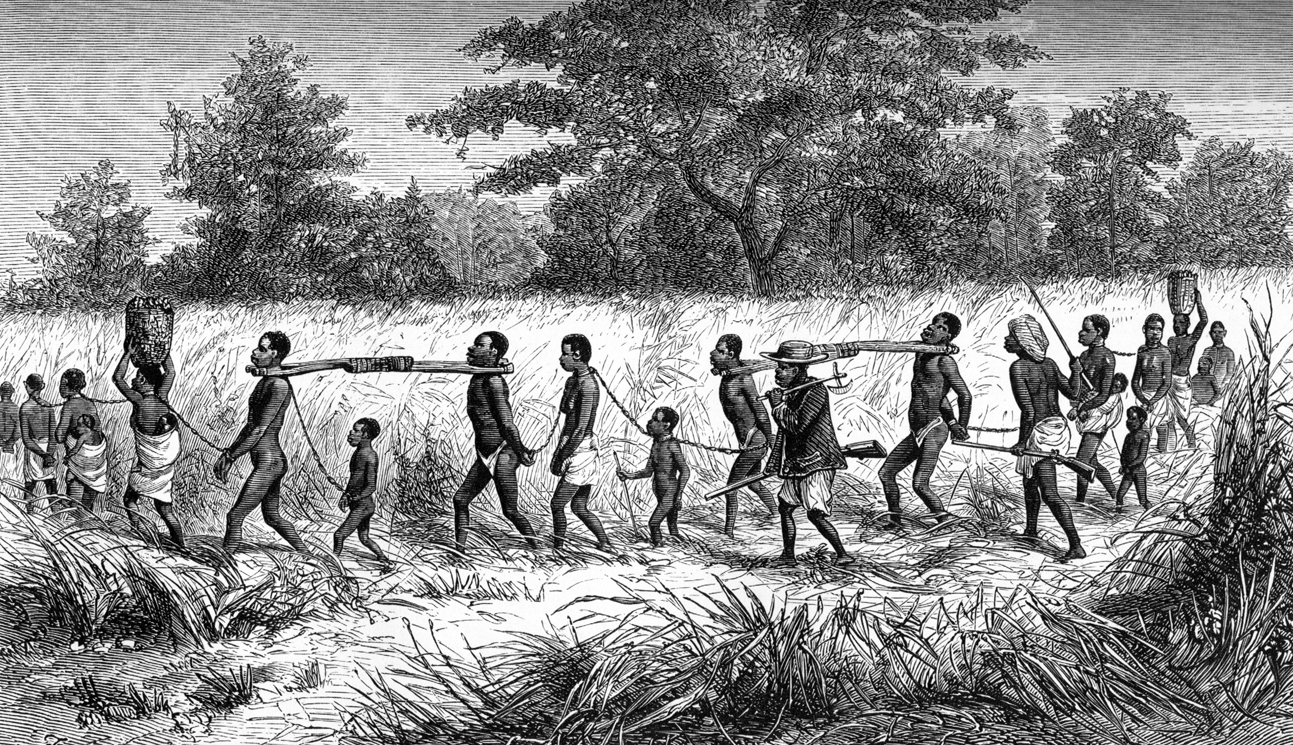
Slave traders and their captives bound in chains and collared with 'taming sticks'. From Livingstone's Narrative

Livingstone was encouraged by the response in Britain to his discoveries and support for future expeditions. He proposed to do more exploration, primarily to find routes for commercial trade which he believed would displace slave trade routes, more so than for solely missionary work. The LMS on learning of his plans sent a letter which Livingstone received at Quelimane, congratulating him on his journey but said that the directors were "restricted in their power of aiding plans connected only remotely with the spread of the Gospel". This brusque rejection for new mission stations north of the Zambezi and his wider object of opening the interior for trade via the Zambezi, was not enough to make him resign from the LMS at once. When Roderick Murchison, president of the Royal Geographical Society, put him in touch with the foreign secretary, Livingstone said nothing to the LMS directors, even when his leadership of a government expedition to the Zambezi seemed increasingly likely to be funded by the exchequer. "I am not yet fairly on with the Government," he told a friend, "but am nearly quite off with the Society (LMS)." Livingstone resigned from the LMS in 1857, and in May he was appointed as her majesty's consul with a roving commission, extending through Mozambique to the areas west of it. In February 1858 his area of jurisdiction was stipulated to be "the Eastern Coast of Africa and the independent districts in the interior".

While he negotiated with the government for his new position as consul, the LMS thought that he would return to Africa with their mission to the Kololo in Barotseland, which Livingstone had promoted. That mission suffered the deaths from malaria of a missionary, his wife, a second missionary's wife, and three children. Livingstone had suffered over 30 attacks during his previous journey but had understated his suffering and overstated the quality of the land they would find, and the missionaries set out for the marshy region with wholly inadequate supplies of quinine. Biographer Tim Jeal considers this episode a major failing for Livingstone and indicative of a pattern of putting his goals and career above the lives of those around him.

Livingstone was a celebrity, in great demand as a public speaker, and was elected to the Royal Society. He gained public backing for his plans and raised finances for his next expedition by public subscription, as well as £5,000 from the government to investigate the potential for British trade via the Zambezi.

=== Zambezi expedition ===
In December 1857 the Foreign Office proposed a huge expedition. Livingstone had envisaged another solo journey with African helpers, and in January 1858 he agreed to lead a second Zambezi expedition with six specialist officers, hurriedly recruited in the UK. The prefabricated iron river steamer Ma Robert was quickly built in portable sections and loaded onto the Colonial Office steamer Pearl, which took them out on its way to Ceylon. They left on 10 March, at Freetown collected 12 Kru seafarers to man the river steamer, and reached the Zambezi on 14 May. The plan was for both ships to take them up the river to establish bases, but it turned out to be completely impassable to boats past the Cahora Bassa rapids, a series of cataracts and rapids that Livingstone had failed to explore on his earlier travels. Pearl offloaded their supplies on an island about 40 miles (64 km) upstream. From there, Ma Robert had to make repeated slow journeys, getting hauled across shoals. The riverbanks were a war zone, with Portuguese soldiers and their slaves fighting the Chikunda slave-hunters of Matakenya (Mariano), but both sides accepted the expedition as friends.

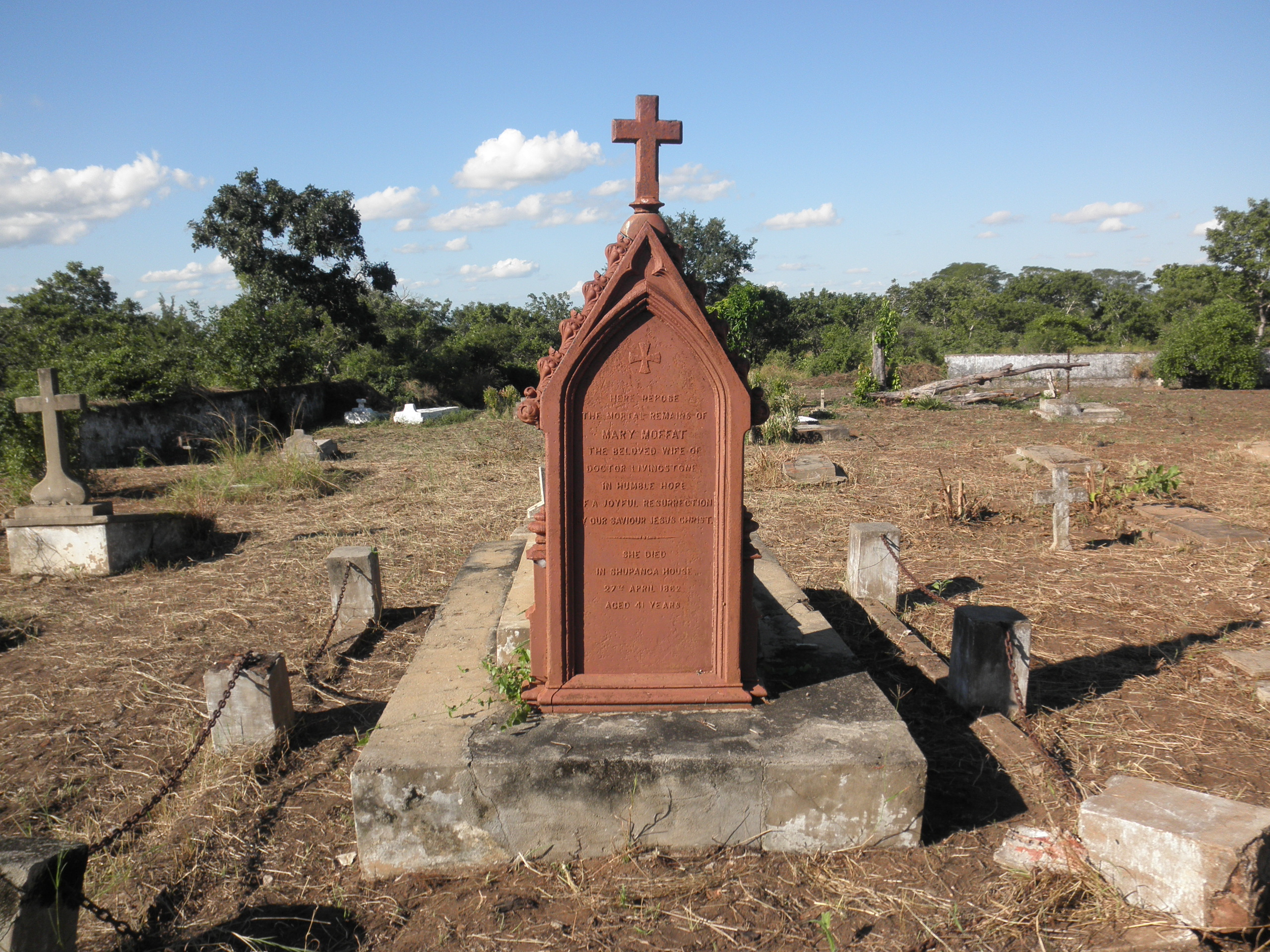
The grave of Livingstone's wife, Mary Moffat Livingstone, in Chupanga, Mozambique. She died in 1862.

The experts, stuck at Shupanga, could not make the intended progress, and there were disagreements. Artist Thomas Baines was dismissed from the expedition. Others on the expedition became the first to reach Lake Nyasa, and they explored it in a four-oared gig. In 1861 the Colonial Office provided a new wooden paddle survey vessel, Pioneer, which took the Universities' Mission to Central Africa led by Bishop Charles MacKenzie up the Shire River to found a mission.

Livingstone raised funds for a replacement river steamer, Lady Nyasa, specially designed to sail on Lake Nyasa. It was shipped out in sections, contrary to his request, with a mission party including Mary Livingstone, and arrived in 1862. The Pioneer was delayed getting down to the coast to meet them, and there were further delays after it was found that MacKenzie had died from malaria. Mary Livingstone died on 27 April 1862 from malaria.

Livingstone took Pioneer up the coast and investigated the Ruvuma River, and the physician John Kirk wrote "I can come to no other conclusion than that Dr Livingstone is out of his mind and a most unsafe leader". When Pioneer returned to Shupanga in December 1862, they paid (in cloth) their "Mazaro men" who left and engaged replacements. On 10 January 1863 they set off, towing Lady Nyasa, and went up the Shire River past scenes of devastation as Mariano's Chikunda slave-hunts caused famine, and they frequently had to clear the paddle wheels of corpses left floating downstream. They reached Chibisa's and the Murchison Cataracts in April, then began dismantling Lady Nyasa and building a road to take its sections past the cataracts, while explorations continued.

He brought the ships downriver in 1864 after the government ordered the recall of the expedition. The Zambezi Expedition was castigated as a failure in many newspapers of the time, and Livingstone experienced great difficulty in raising funds to further explore Africa. John Kirk, Charles Meller, and Richard Thornton (scientists appointed to work under Livingstone) contributed large collections of botanical, ecological, geological, and ethnographic material to scientific institutions in the United Kingdom.

=== Nile exploration ===
In January 1866, Livingstone returned to Africa, this time to Zanzibar, and from there he set out to seek the source of the Nile. Richard Francis Burton, John Hanning Speke, and Samuel Baker had identified either Lake Albert or Lake Victoria as the source (which was partially correct, as the Nile "bubbles from the ground high in the mountains of Burundi halfway between Lake Tanganyika and Lake Victoria"), but there was still debate on the matter. Livingstone believed that the source was farther south and assembled a team to find it consisting of freed slaves, Comoros Islanders, twelve Sepoys, and two servants from his previous expedition, Chuma and Susi.

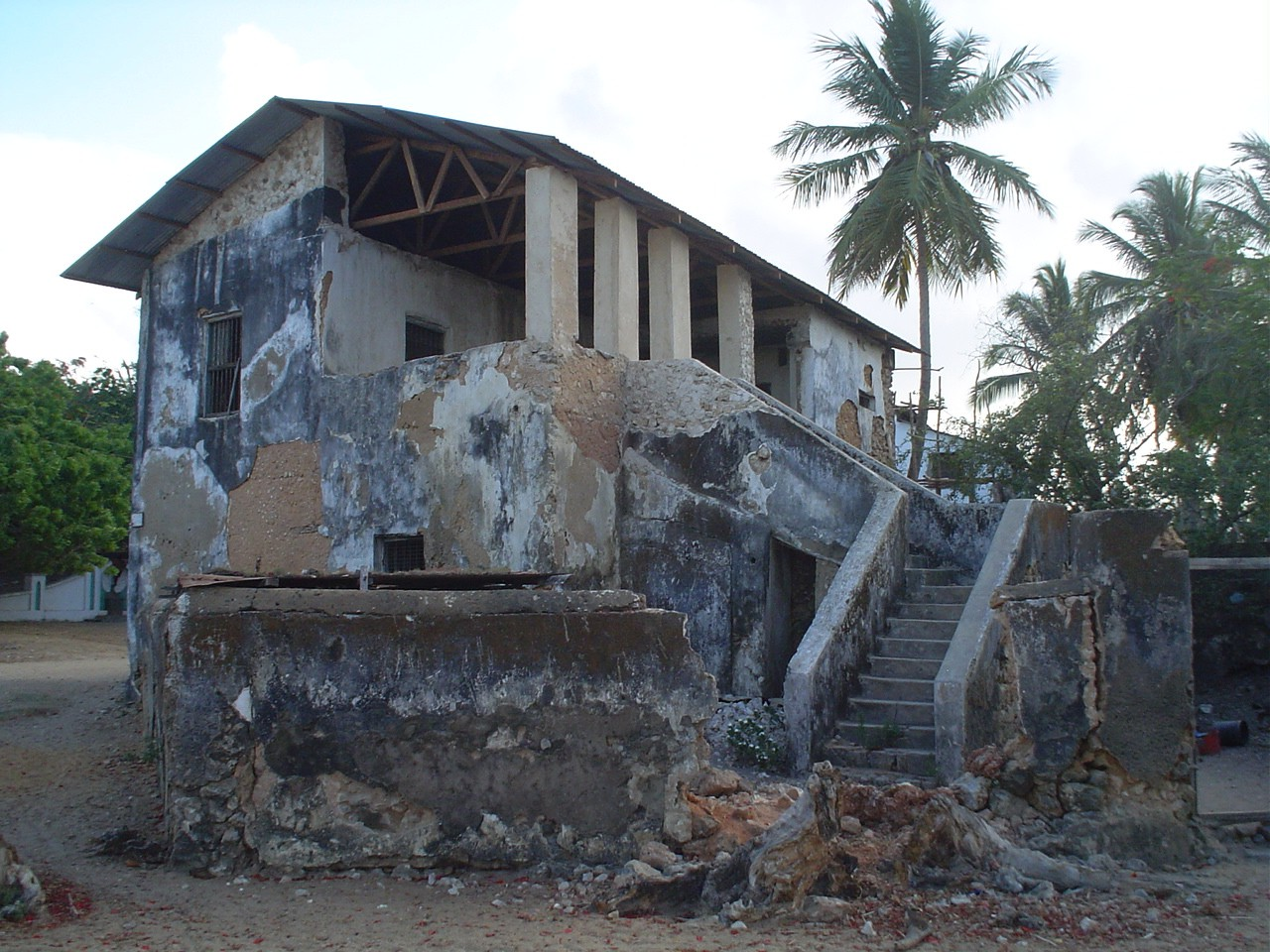
This house in Mikindani in southern Tanzania was the starting point for Livingstone's last expedition. He stayed here from 24 March to 7 April 1866.

Livingstone set out from the mouth of the Ruvuma River, but his assistants gradually began deserting him. The Comoros Islanders had returned to Zanzibar and (falsely) informed authorities that Livingstone had died. He reached Lake Malawi on 6 August, by which time most of his supplies had been stolen, including all his medicines. Livingstone then travelled through swamps in the direction of Lake Tanganyika, with his health declining. He sent a message to Zanzibar requesting that supplies be sent to Ujiji and he then headed west, forced by ill health to travel with slave traders. He arrived at Lake Mweru on 8 November 1867 and continued on, travelling south to become the first European to see Lake Bangweulu. Upon finding the Lualaba River, Livingstone theorised that it could have been the high part of the Nile; but he realised that it in fact flowed into the Congo at Upper Congo Lake.

The year 1869 began with Livingstone finding himself extremely ill while in the jungle. He was saved by Arab traders who gave him medicines and carried him to an Arab outpost.

On 15 July 1871, Livingstone recorded in his field diary his immediate impressions as he witnessed around 400 Africans being massacred by Arab slavers at the Nyangwe market on the banks of the Lualaba River, while he was watching next to the leading Arab trader Dugumbe who had given him assistance. The cause behind this attack is stated to be retaliation for actions of Manilla, the head slave who had sacked villages of Mohombo people at the instigation of the Wagenya chieftain Kimburu. The Arabs attacked the shoppers and Kimburu's people. Researchers from the Indiana University of Pennsylvania who scanned Livingstone's diary suggest that in putting his fragmentary notes about the massacre into the narrative of his journal, he left out his concerns about some of his followers, slaves owned by Banyan merchants who had been hired by John Kirk, acting consul at Zanzibar, and sent to get Livingstone to safety. These slaves had been liberated and added to his party but had shown violent conduct against local people contrary to his instructions, and he feared they might have been involved in starting the massacre.

His diary notes "Dugumbe's men murdering Kimburu and another for slaves" and implies that the slave Manilla played a leading part, but looking back at the events, he says Dugumbé's people bore responsibility, and started it to make an example of Manilla. In the diary he describes his sending his men with protection of a flag to assist Manilla's brother. In his journal version it was to assist villagers. The version edited by Waller in the "Last Journals", published in 1874, leaves out the context of Livingstone's earlier comments about Kirk and bad behaviour of the hired Banyan men, and omits the villagers' earlier violent resistance to Arab slavers, so it portrays the villagers as passive victims. The section on the massacre has only minor grammatical corrections. Further research into diary notes continues.

The massacre horrified Livingstone, leaving him too shattered to continue his mission to find the source of the Nile. Following the end of the wet season, he travelled 240 miles (390 km) from Nyangwe back to Ujiji, an Arab settlement on the eastern shore of Lake Tanganyika—violently ill most of the way—arriving on 23 October 1871.

=== Geographical discoveries ===
Livingstone was wrong about the Nile, but he identified numerous geographical features for Western science, such as Lake Ngami, Lake Malawi, and Lake Bangweulu, as well as Victoria Falls. He filled in details of Lake Tanganyika, Lake Mweru, and the course of many rivers, especially the upper Zambezi, and his observations enabled large regions to be mapped which previously had been blank. Even so, the farthest north he reached was the north end of Lake Tanganyika—still south of the Equator—and he did not penetrate the rainforest of the River Congo any farther downstream than Ntangwe near Misisi.

Livingstone was awarded the gold medal of the Royal Geographical Society of London and was made a Fellow of the society, with which he had a strong association for the rest of his life.

== Henry Morton Stanley ==
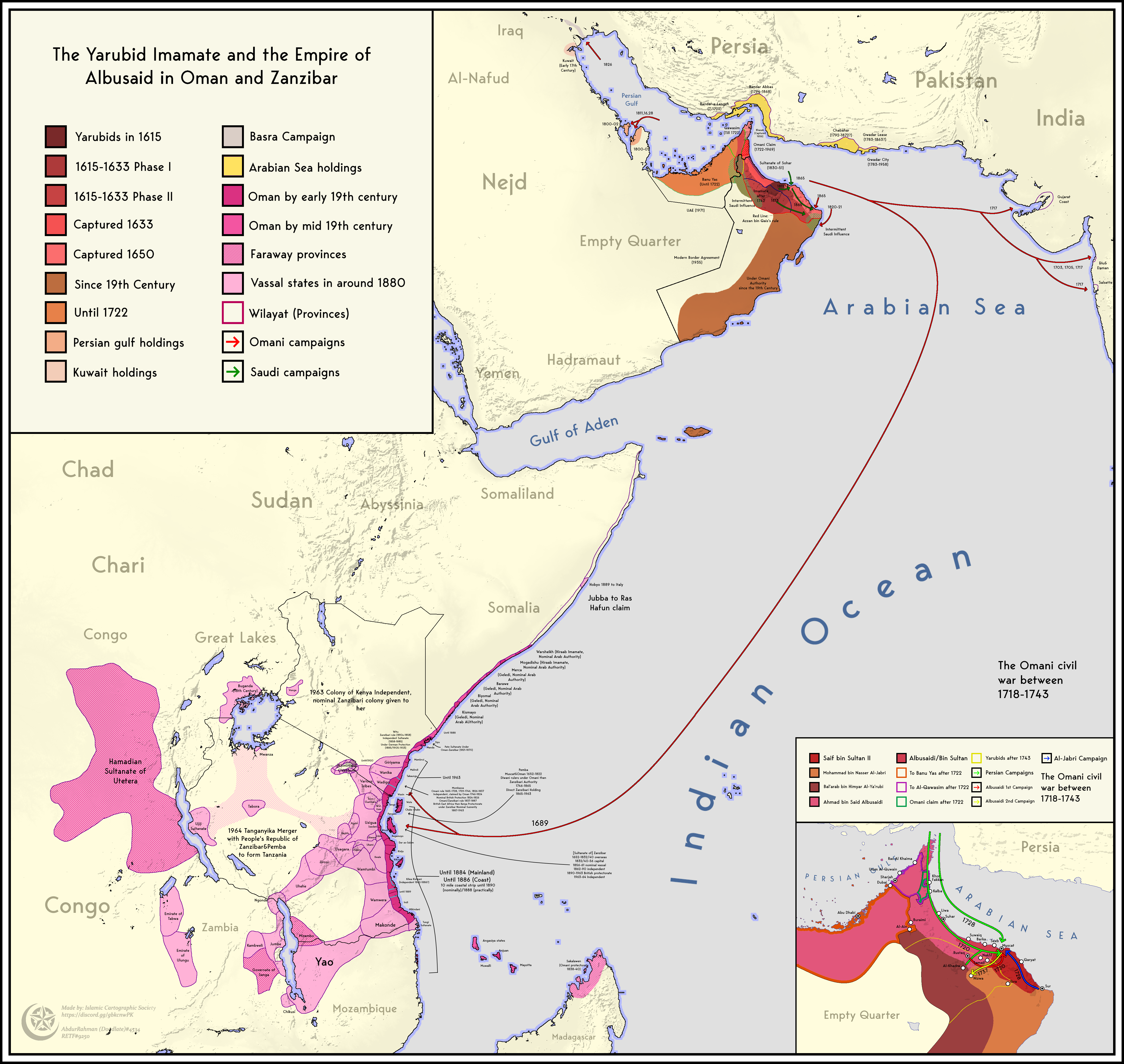
Livingstone's meeting with Stanley took place at Ujiji, an Arab trading post under the Sultanate of Zanzibar, marked in pink at the bottom left of this map.

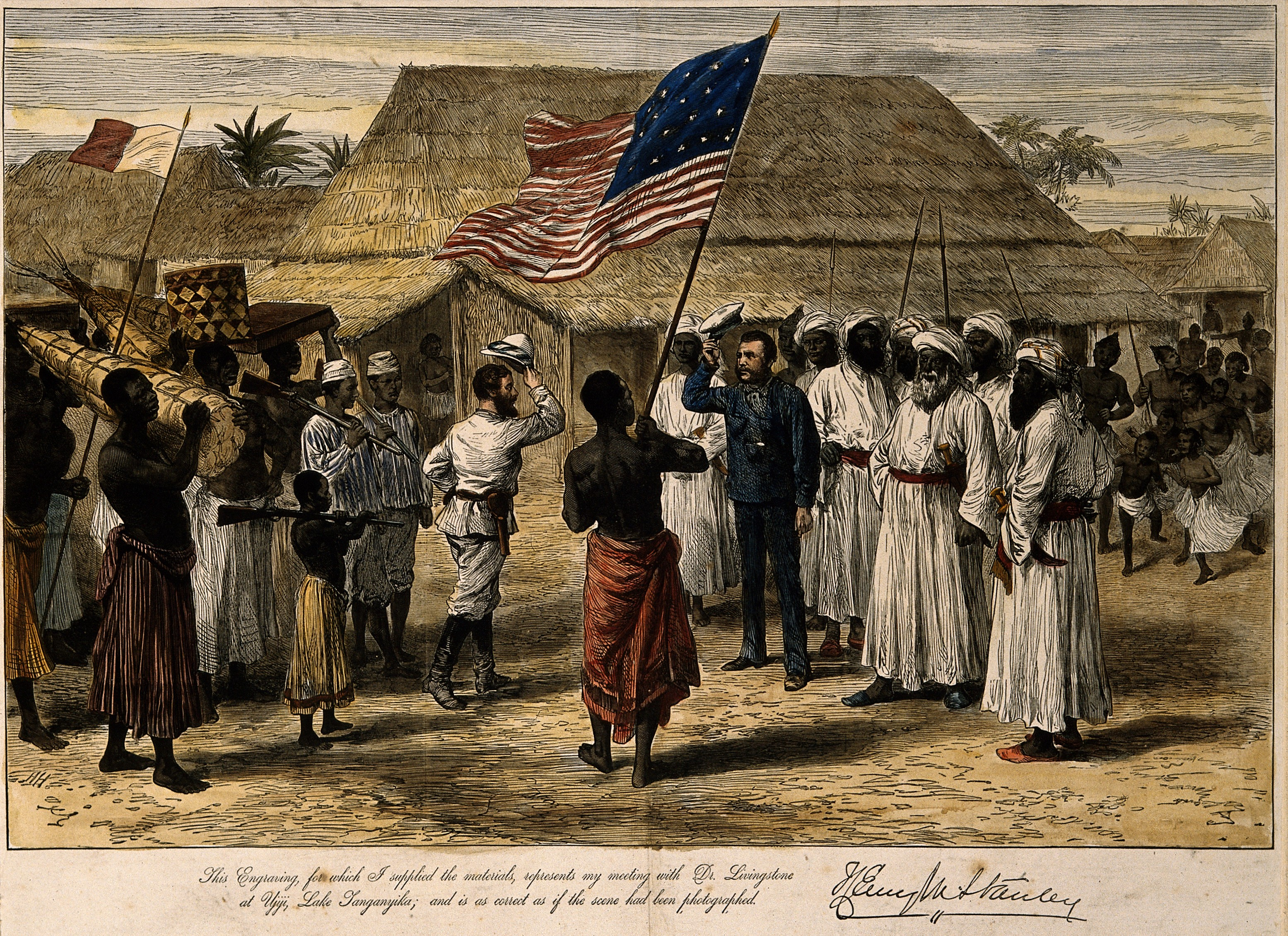
Henry Morton Stanley meets David Livingstone

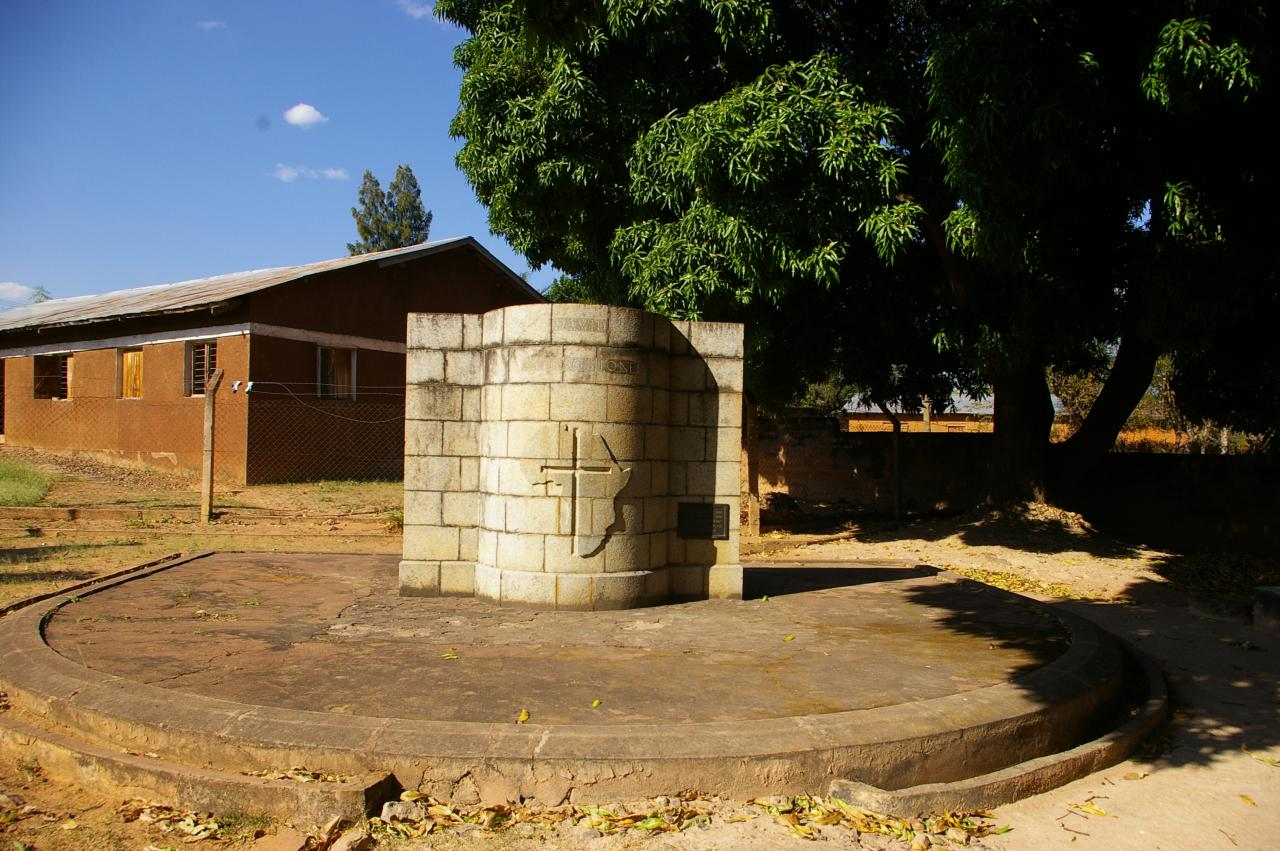
Livingstone Memorial in Ujiji, Tanzania

Livingstone completely lost contact with the outside world for six years and was ill for most of the last four years of his life. Only one of his 44 letter dispatches made it to Zanzibar. One surviving letter to Horace Waller was made available to the public in 2010 by its owner Peter Beard. It reads: "I am terribly knocked up but this is for your own eye only... Doubtful if I live to see you again..."

Henry Morton Stanley had been sent to find him by the New York Herald newspaper in 1869. He found Livingstone in Ujiji on 10 November 1871, apparently greeting him with the words "Dr. Livingstone, I presume?" Livingstone responded, "Yes", and then, "I feel thankful that I am here to welcome you." These words may have been a fabrication, as Stanley later tore out the pages of this encounter in his diary. Livingstone's account of this encounter does not mention these words. However, the phrase appears in a New York Herald editorial dated 10 August 1872, and the Encyclopædia Britannica and the Oxford Dictionary of National Biography both quote it without questioning its veracity. The quote attracted attention because of its perceived humour, Livingstone being the only other white person for hundreds of miles, along with Stanley's clumsy attempt at appearing dignified in the bush of Africa by making a formal greeting one might expect to hear in the confines of an upper-class London club. However, readers of the Herald immediately saw through Stanley's pretensions. According to his biographer Tim Jeal, Stanley struggled his whole life with a self-perceived weakness of being from a humble background, and manufactured events to make up for this supposed deficiency. Stanley's book suggests that this greeting was truly motivated by embarrassment, because he did not dare to embrace Livingstone.

Despite Stanley's urgings, Livingstone was determined not to leave Africa until his mission was complete. His illness made him confused, and he had judgment difficulties at the end of his life. He explored the Lualaba and, failing to find connections to the Nile, returned to Lake Bangweulu and its swamps to explore possible rivers flowing out northwards.

== Christianity and Sechele ==
Livingstone is known as "Africa's greatest missionary", yet he is recorded as having converted only one African: Sechele, who was the chief of the Kwena people of Botswana (Kwena are one of the main Sotho-Tswana clans, found in South Africa, Lesotho, and Botswana in all three Sotho-Tswana language groupings). Sechele was born in 1812. His father died when Sechele was 10, and two of his uncles divided the tribe, which forced Sechele to leave his home for nine years. When Sechele returned, he took over one of his uncle's tribes; at that point, he met Livingstone. Livingstone immediately became interested in Sechele, and especially his ability to read. Being a quick learner, Sechele learned the alphabet in two days and soon called English a second language. After teaching his wives the skill, he wrote the Bible in his native tongue.

Livingstone was known through a large part of Africa for treating the natives with respect, and the tribes that he visited returned his respect with faith and loyalty. He could never permanently convert the tribesmen to Christianity, however. Among other reasons, Sechele, by then the leader of the African tribe, did not like the way that Livingstone could not demand rain of his God like his rainmakers, who said that they could. After long hesitation from Livingstone, he baptised Sechele and had the church completely embrace him. Sechele was part of the church, but he continued to act according to his African culture, which went against Livingstone's teachings.

Sechele was no different from any other man of his tribe in believing in polygamy. He had five wives, including MmaKgari (SeTswana for "mother of Kgari"), Mokgokong and Masebele. When Livingstone imposed on him to get rid of four of them, it shook the foundations of the Kwena tribe. After he finally divorced the women, Livingstone baptised them all and everything seemingly went well. However, one year later one of his ex-wives became pregnant, and Sechele was the father. Sechele asked Livingstone not to give up on him because his faith was still strong, but Livingstone left the country and went north to continue his futile Christianizing attempts.

After Livingstone left the Kwena tribe, Sechele remained faithful to Christianity and led missionaries to surrounding tribes as well as converting nearly his entire Kwena people. In the estimation of Neil Parsons of the University of Botswana, Sechele "did more to propagate Christianity in 19th-century southern Africa than virtually any single European missionary". Although Sechele was a self-proclaimed Christian, many European missionaries disagreed. The Kwena tribe leader kept rainmaking a part of his life as well as polygamy.

== Death ==
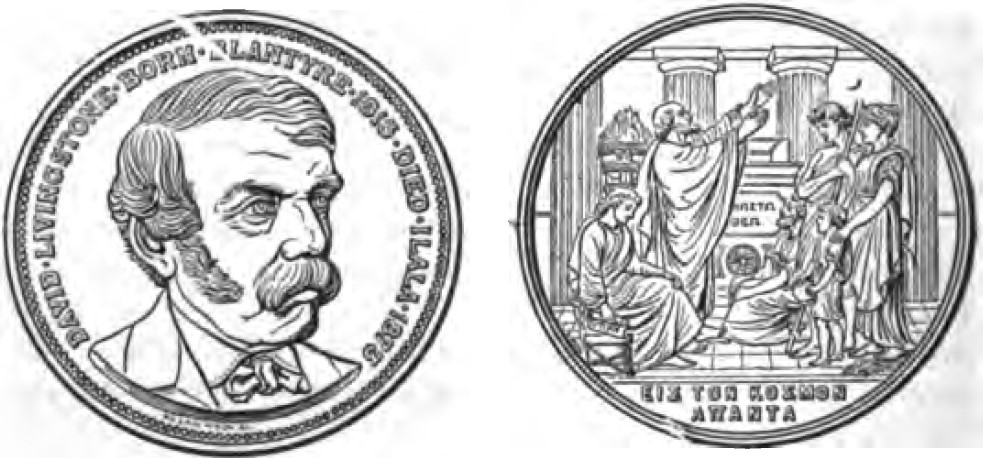
David Livingstone Medal

Livingstone died on 1 May 1873 at age 60 in Chief Chitambo's village at Chipundu, southeast of Lake Bangweulu, in present-day Zambia, from malaria and internal bleeding due to dysentery. Led by his loyal attendants Chuma and Susi, his expedition arranged funeral ceremonies. They removed his heart and buried it under a tree near the spot where he died, which has been identified variously as a mvula tree or a baobab tree but is more likely to be a mpundu tree, as baobabs are found at lower altitudes and in more arid regions. That site, now known as the Livingstone Memorial, lists his date of death as 4 May, the date reported (and carved into the tree's trunk) by Chuma and Susi; but most sources consider 1 May—the date of Livingstone's final journal entry—as the correct one.

The expedition led by Chuma and Susi then carried the rest of his remains, together with his last journal and belongings, on a journey that took 63 days to the coastal town of Bagamoyo, a distance exceeding 1,000 miles (1,600 km). The caravan encountered the expedition of English explorer Verney Lovett Cameron, who continued his march and reached Ujiji in February 1874, where he found and sent to England Livingstone's papers. Seventy-nine followers completed the journey, the men were paid their due wages, and Livingstone's remains were returned by ship to Britain for burial. In London, his body lay in repose at No.1 Savile Row, then the headquarters of the Royal Geographical Society, prior to interment at Westminster Abbey.

== Views on slavery ==
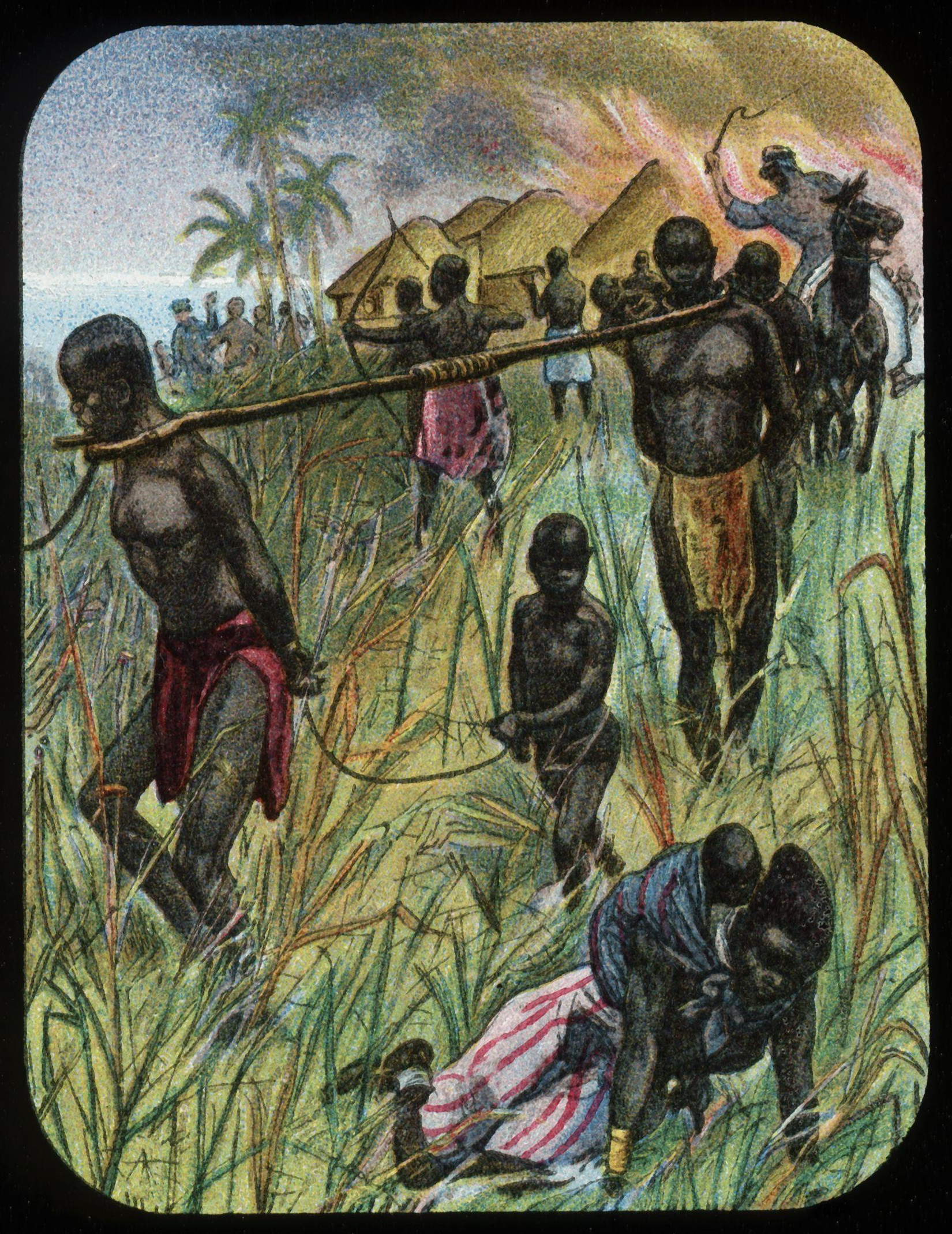
Arab slave traders and their captives

And if my disclosures regarding the terrible Ujijian slavery should lead to the suppression of the East Coast slave trade, I shall regard that as a greater matter by far than the discovery of all the Nile sources together.

— Livingstone in a letter to the editor of the New York Herald

While talking about the slave trade in East Africa in his journals:

To overdraw its evil is a simple impossibility.

Livingstone writes about a group of slaves forced to march by Arab slave traders in the African Great Lakes region when he was travelling there in 1866:

We passed a slave woman shot or stabbed through the body and lying on the path: a group of men stood about a hundred yards off on one side, and another of the women on the other side, looking on; they said an Arab who passed early that morning had done it in anger at losing the price he had given for her, because she was unable to walk any longer. 27th June 1866 – To-day we came upon a man dead from starvation, as he was very thin. One of our men wandered and found many slaves with slave-sticks on, abandoned by their masters from want of food; they were too weak to be able to speak or say where they had come from; some were quite young.

— Livingstone 1874, p. 62

He also describes:

The strangest disease I have seen in this country seems really to be broken-heartedness, and it attacks free men who have been captured and made slaves... Twenty one were unchained, as now safe; however all ran away at once; but eight with many others still in chains, died in three days after the crossing. They described their only pain in the heart, and placed the hand correctly on the spot, though many think the organ stands high up in the breast-bone.

— Livingstone 1874, p. 352

Often cited is Livingstone's estimate of the number of slaves that made it to market versus those who died because of the slave trade:

Flight, starvation, and death ensue; and we must again record our conviction that the mortality after these slave wars, in addition to the losses on the journey to the Coast and during the middle passage, makes it certain that not more than one in five ever reach the "kind masters" in Cuba and elsewhere, whom, according to slave-owners' interpretation of Scripture, Providence intended for them.

— Livingstone, 1865

Livingstone's figures on slaves have been criticised as highly exaggerated. Livingstone's letters, books, and journals did stir up public support for the abolition of slavery; however, he became dependent for assistance on the very slave-traders whom he wished to put out of business. He was a poor leader of his peers, and he ended up on his last expedition as an individualist explorer with servants and porters but no expert support around him. At the same time, he did not use the brutal methods of maverick explorers such as Stanley to keep his retinue of porters in line and his supplies secure. For these reasons, he accepted help and hospitality from 1867 onwards from Mohamad Bogharib and Mohamad bin Saleh (also known as "Mpamari"), traders who kept and traded in slaves, as he recounts in his journals. They, in turn, benefited from Livingstone's influence with local people, which facilitated Mpamari's release from bondage to Mwata Kazembe. Livingstone was furious to discover that some of the replacement porters sent at his request from Ujiji were slaves.

== Family ==
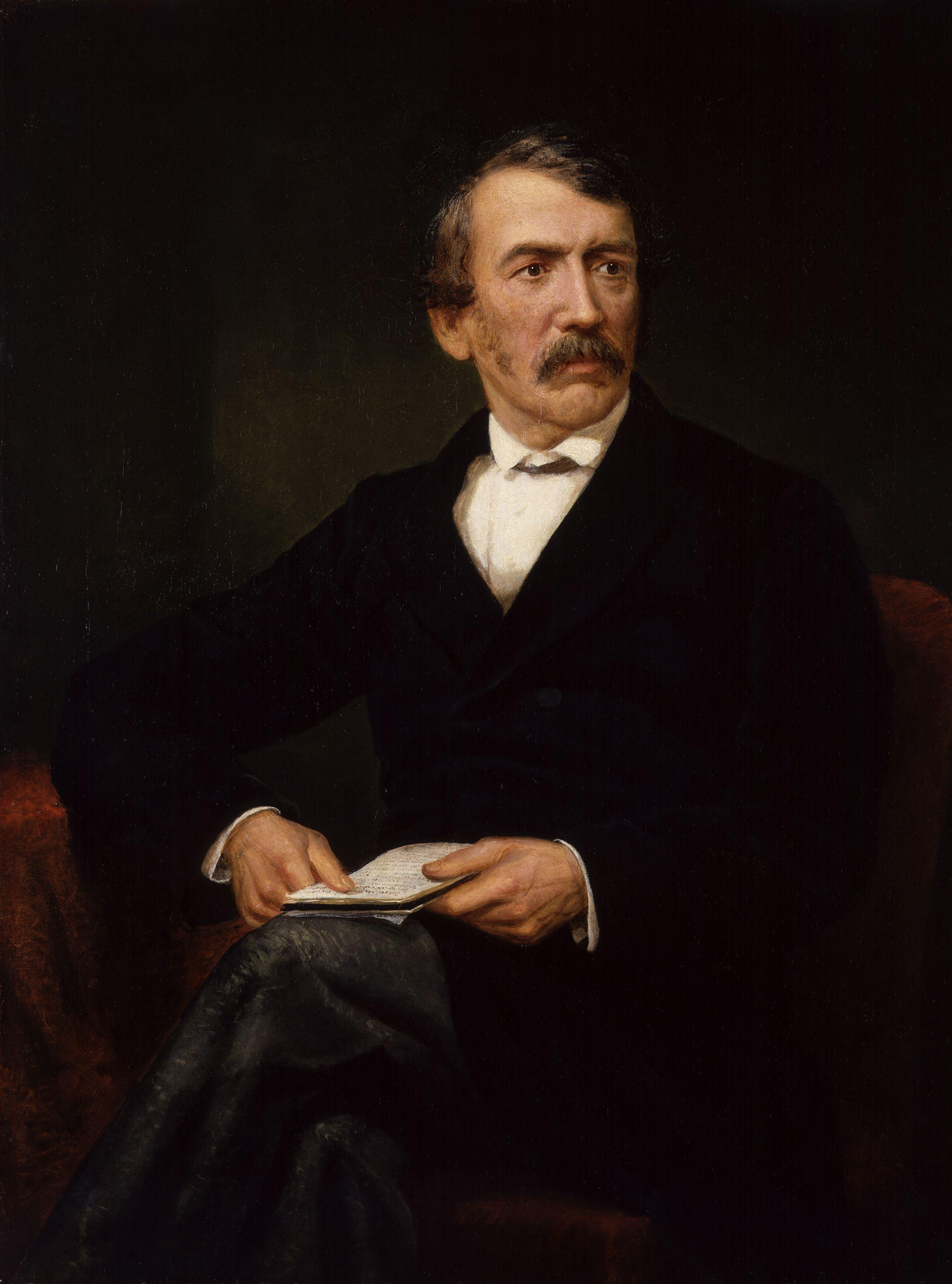
Posthumous portrait of David Livingstone by Frederick Havill

While Livingstone had a great impact on the expansion of the British Empire, he did so at a tremendous cost to his family. In his absences, his children grew up missing their father, and his wife Mary (daughter of Mary and Robert Moffat), whom he married in 1845, endured very poor health, and died of malaria on 27 April 1862.

He had six children:

1. Robert died while serving in the Union Army during the American Civil War; He took the name Rupert Vincent and was the substitute for Horace Heath, and took his place in Company H of the 3rd New Hampshire Volunteers. Robert ended up being captured by the Confederate States Army and died at the Salisbury prison camp in Rowan County, North Carolina, which has since been termed, "North Carolina's Andersonville."
2. Agnes (born 1847 or 1857, died 1912; married A.L. Bruce, a wealthy Scottish brewery executive.)
3. Thomas, died in Egypt in 1876 at the age of 27 from bilharzia, a disease he contracted as a child living in Africa.
4. Elizabeth (who died at two months)
5. William Oswell (nicknamed Zouga because of the river along which he was born, in 1851; died in 1892 in Trinidad where he practiced medicine.)
6. Anna Mary (born 1858, died 1939)

Only Agnes, William Oswell and Anna Mary married and had children. His one regret in later life was that he did not spend enough time with his children.

== Legacy ==
By the late 1860s Livingstone's reputation in Europe had suffered owing to the failure of the missions he set up and of the Zambezi Expedition; and his ideas about the source of the Nile were not supported. His expeditions were hardly models of order and organisation. His reputation was rehabilitated by Stanley and his newspaper, and by the loyalty of Livingstone's servants whose long journey with his body inspired wonder. The publication of his last journal revealed stubborn determination in the face of suffering.

In 1860, the Universities' Mission to Central Africa was founded at his request. Many important missionaries, such as Leader Stirling and Miss Annie Allen, would later work for this group. This group and the medical missionaries it sponsored came to have major, positive impact on the people of Africa.

Livingstone made geographical discoveries for European knowledge. He inspired abolitionists of the slave trade, explorers, and missionaries. He opened up Central Africa to missionaries who initiated the education and healthcare for Africans, and trade by the African Lakes Company. He was held in some esteem by many African chiefs and local people and his name facilitated relations between them and the British.

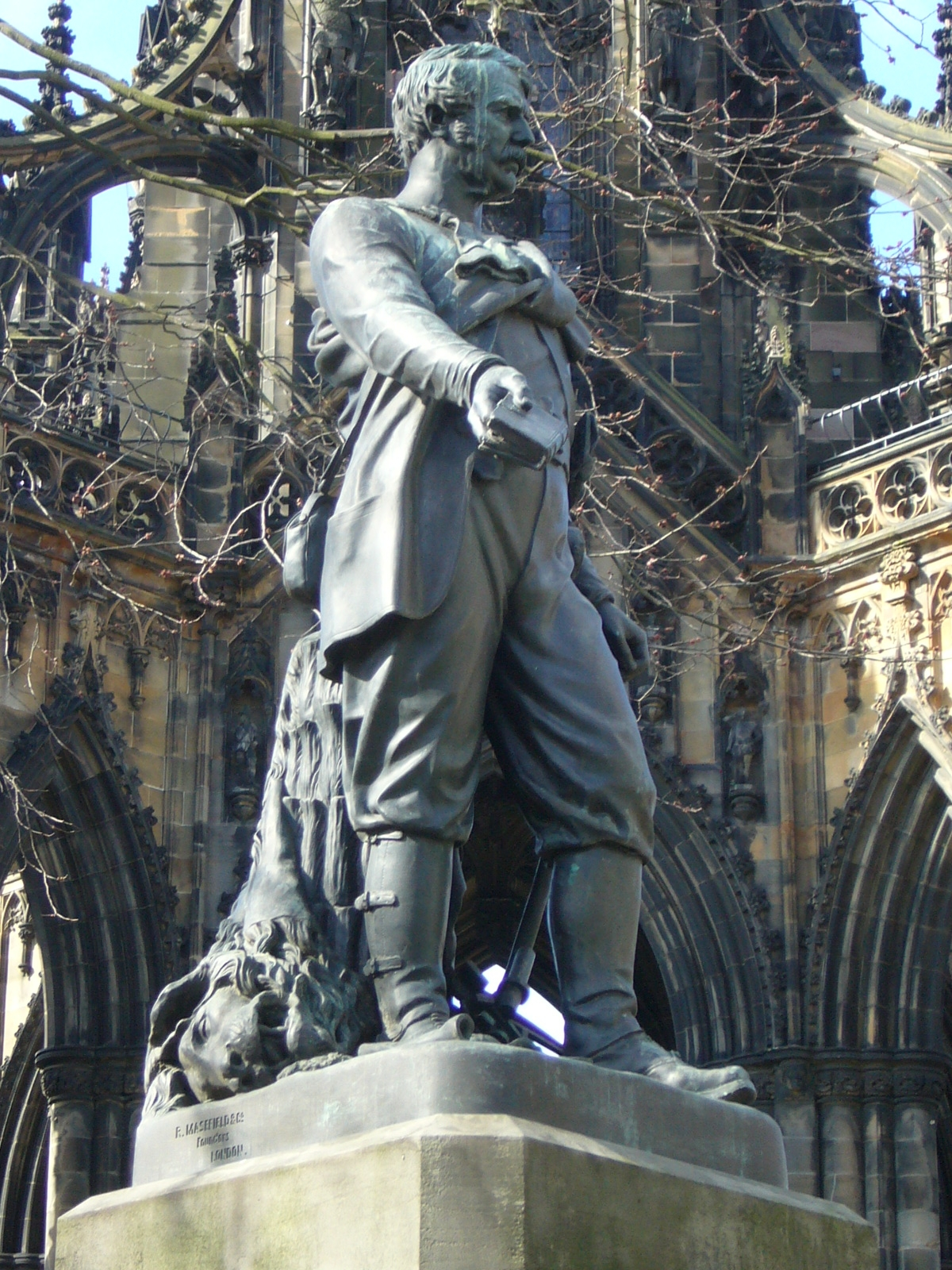
Livingstone statue, Edinburgh by Amelia Robertson Hill

Partly as a result, within 50 years of his death, colonial rule was established in Africa, and white settlement was encouraged to extend further into the interior. However, what Livingstone envisaged for "colonies" was not what we now know as colonial rule, but rather settlements of dedicated Christian Europeans who would live among the people to help them work out ways of living that did not involve slavery. Livingstone was part of an evangelical and nonconformist movement in Britain which during the 19th century helped change the national mindset from the notion of a divine right to rule 'lesser races', to more modernly ethical ideas in foreign policy.

The David Livingstone Centre in Blantyre celebrates his life and is based in the house in which he was born, on the site of the mill in which he started his working life. His Christian faith is evident in his journal, in which one entry reads: "I place no value on anything I have or may possess, except in relation to the kingdom of Christ. If anything will advance the interests of the kingdom, it shall be given away or kept, only as by giving or keeping it I shall promote the glory of Him to whom I owe all my hopes in time and eternity."

According to Alvyn Austin in 1997:

During the anti-colonial 1960s, Livingstone was debunked: he made only one certified convert, who later backslid; he explored few areas not already traveled by others; he freed few slaves; he treated his colleagues horribly; he traveled with Arab slave traders; his family life was in shambles—in short, to many he embodied the "White Man's Burden" mentality. Nonetheless, at a time when countries are being renamed and statues are being toppled, Livingstone has not fallen. Despite modern Africans' animosity toward other Europeans, such as Cecil Rhodes, Livingstone endures as a heroic legend. Rhodesia has long since purged its name, but the cities of Livingstone (Zambia) and Livingstonia (Malawi) keep the explorer's appellation with pride.

In 2002, Livingstone was ranked 98th among the 100 Greatest Britons following a UK-wide vote.

In 1932, several items related to Livingstone were put on display at a Missionary Exhibition in Bromley: a piece of wood from the tree under which his heart had been buried plus slave chains and irons brought to England by Livingstone himself. According to the extensive article about the exhibition published in the "Bromley Mercury", they were especially lent for the occasion by one of Livingstone's daughters.

Many events were held on 1913 to celebrate the centenary of Livingstone's birth, the principal of which took place in the Royal Albert Hall. The Archbishop of Canterbury, Randall Davidson, presided and stated that Livingstone "carved his name on the history of mankind" and "literally left his footprints on the sands of time". Another speaker was Harry Johnston, who expressed his feelings about what he termed the "inadequate consideration" shown to Livingstone during his lifetime, and the "stupidity" preventing the publication of Livingstone's journals. As well as speeches, there was a performance by a choir of 300 of the cantata, "Livingstone the pilgrim", composed by the Reverend Silvester Horne and Hamish McCunn.

The Hispanic Society of America was instituted the David Livingstone Centenary Medal. The award was set up to coincide with Livingstone's centenary and is awarded by the American Geographical Society. Theodore Roosevelt was awarded the medal in 1917. The medal was designed by Gutzon Borglum, most famous for the sculptures on Mount Rushmore.

On 11 November 2011, Livingstone's 1871 Field Diary and other original works were published online for the first time by the David Livingstone Spectral Imaging Project. Papers relating to Livingstone's time as a LMS missionary (including hand-annotated maps of South East Africa) are held by the Archives of the School of Oriental and African Studies. Digital archives unifying these and other sources are made publicly available by the Livingstone Online project at the University of Nebraska–Lincoln.

=== Place names and other memorials ===
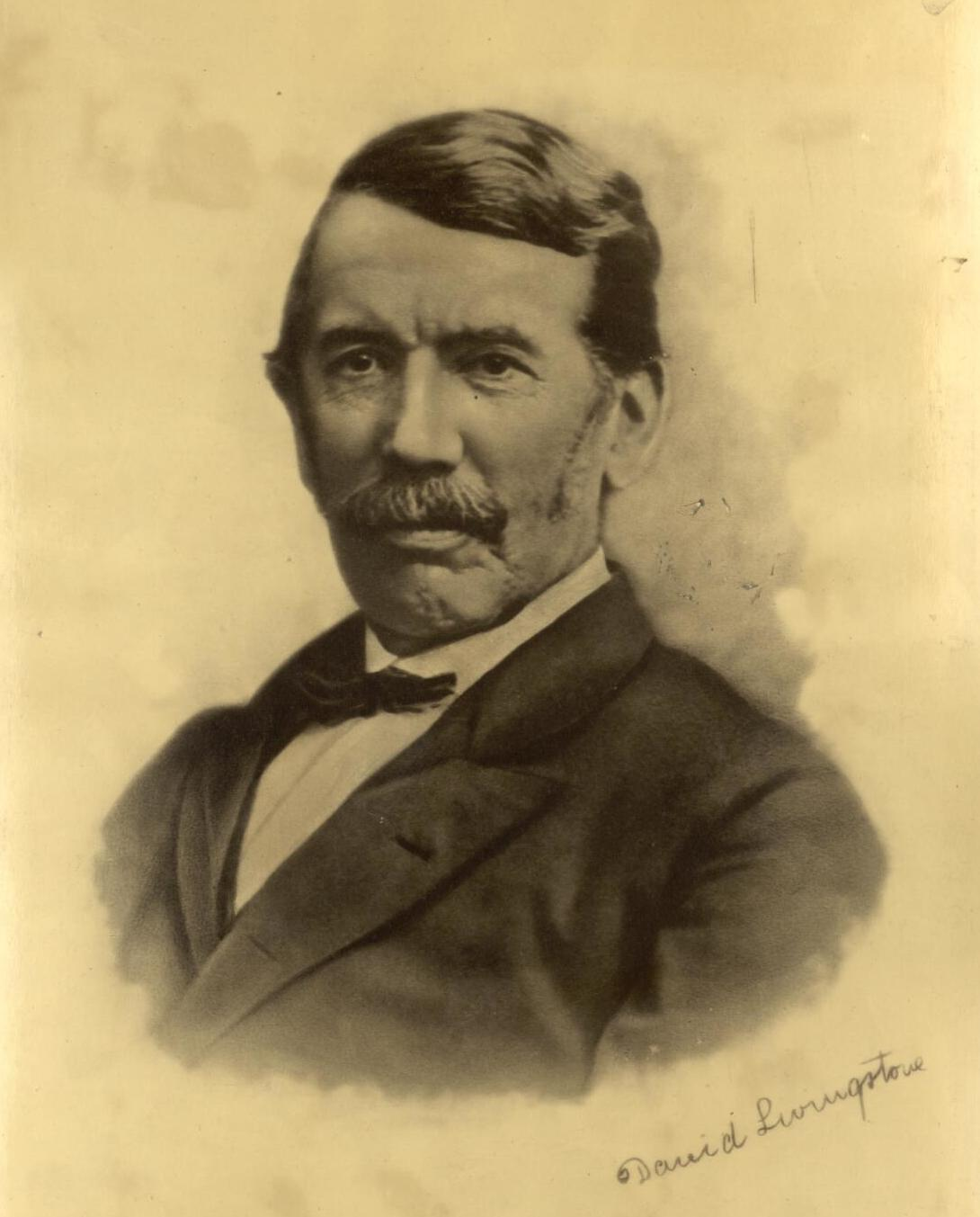
Photograph of Livingstone in later life

==== Botswana ====
- Scottish Livingstone Hospital in Molepolole 50 km west of Gaborone, Botswana
- There is a memorial to Livingstone at the ruins of the Kolobeng Mission, 40 km west of Gaborone, Botswana.
- Livingstone Kolobeng College, a private secondary school in Gaborone, Botswana.

==== Burundi ====
The Livingstone–Stanley Monument in Mugere (present-day Burundi) marks a spot that Livingstone and Stanley visited on their exploration of Lake Tanganyika, mistaken by some as the first meeting place of the two explorers.

==== Congo ====
- Livingstone Falls on the River Congo, named by Stanley.
- The Livingstone Inland Mission, a Baptist mission to the Central Africa 1877–1884, located in present-day Kinshasa, Democratic Republic of the Congo.

==== Ghana ====
- Livingstone House, Achimota School, Ghana (boys' boarding house).

==== Kenya ====
- Dr Livingstone Primary School in Nairobi, Kenya.
- Livingstone house, Alliance Highschool in Kiambu, Kenya.

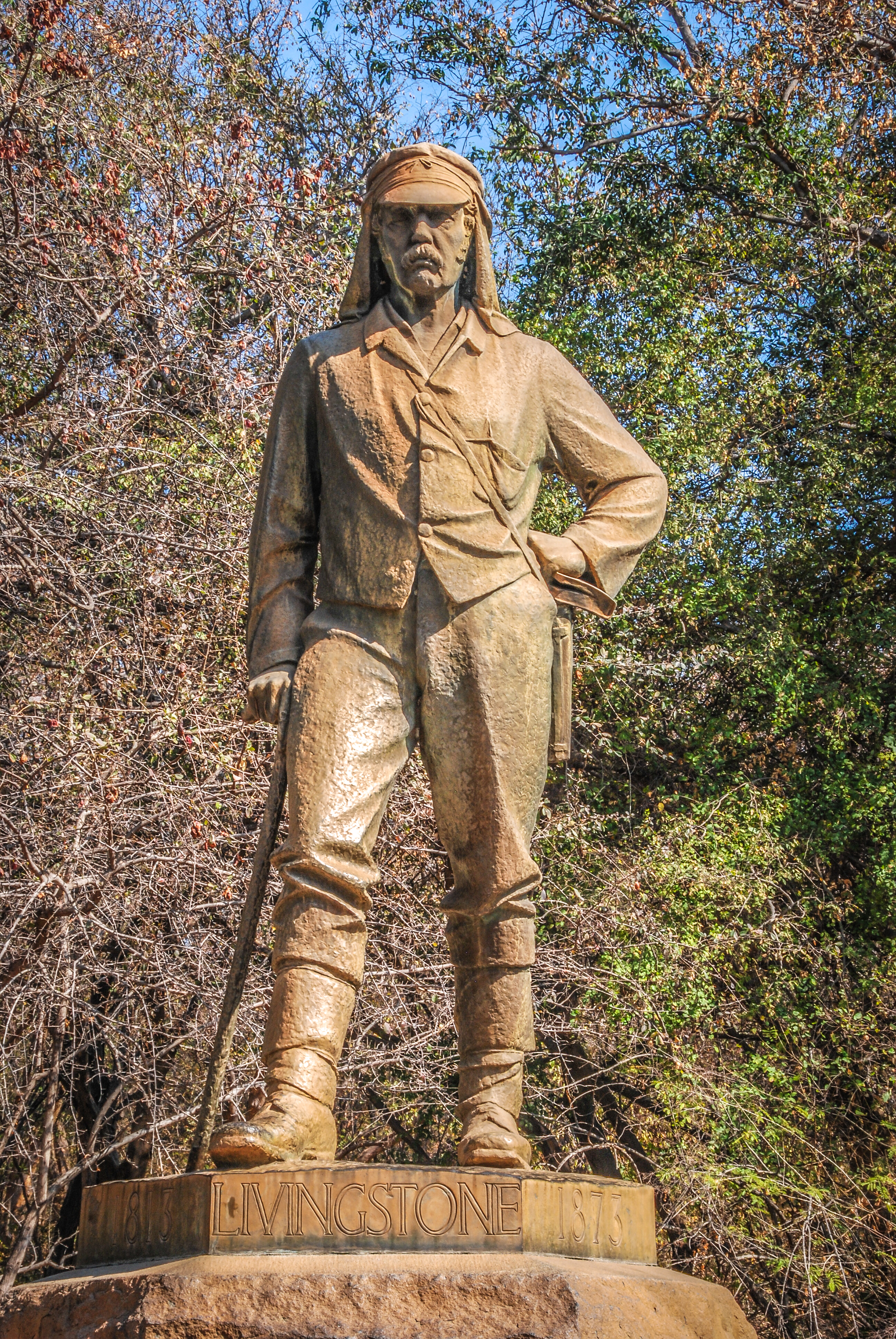
David Livingstone statue at Victoria Falls, the first statue on the Zimbabwean side

==== Malawi ====
- The town of Livingstonia, Malawi.
- The city of Blantyre, Malawi is named after Livingstone's birthplace in Scotland, and includes a memorial.
- The David Livingstone Scholarships for students at the University of Malawi, funded through Strathclyde University, Scotland.
- The David Livingstone Clinic was founded by the University of Strathclyde's Millennium Project in Lilongwe, Malawi.
- The Kipengere Range in south-west Tanzania at the north-eastern end of Lake Malawi is also called the Livingstone Mountains.

==== Namibia ====
- David Livingstone Museum in Sangwali, north-eastern Namibia. Livingstone stayed at Sangwali in the 1850s before travelling further north.

==== South Africa ====
- David Livingstone Senior Secondary School in Schauderville, Port Elizabeth, South Africa.
- Livingstone Hospital, Port Elizabeth, South Africa.

==== Tanzania ====
- A memorial in Ujiji commemorates his meeting with Stanley.
- The church tower of the Holy Ghost Mission (Catholic) in Bagamoyo, Tanzania, is sometimes called "Livingstone Tower" as Livingstone's body was laid down there for one night before it was shipped to London.
- Livingstone House in Stone Town, Zanzibar, provided by the Sultan for Livingstone's use, January to March 1866, to prepare his last expedition; the house was purchased by the Zanzibar government in 1947.
- Plaque commemorating his departure from Mikindani (present-day Tanzania) on his final expedition on the wall of the house that has been built over the house he reputedly stayed in.
- Livingstone Street, Dar es Salaam, Tanzania.

==== Uganda ====
- Livingstone Hall, Men's Hall of residence at Makerere University, Kampala, Uganda.

==== Zambia ====
- The Livingstone Memorial in Ilala, Zambia marks where David Livingstone died
- The city of Livingstone, Zambia, which includes a memorial in front of the Livingstone Museum and a new statue erected in 2005.
- The Rhodes-Livingstone Institute, located a few miles outside Lusaka, Zambia, 1937 to 1964, was a pioneering research institution in anthropology.
- David Livingstone Teachers' Training College, Livingstone, Zambia.
- A new statue of David Livingstone was erected in November 2005 on the Zambian side of Victoria Falls.

==== Zimbabwe ====
- The David Livingstone Memorial statue at Victoria Falls, Zimbabwe, erected in 1934 on the western bank of the falls. Michler 2007 quoted 1954 which is wrong. The statue was unveiled on 5 August 1934
- A plaque was unveiled in November 2005 at Livingstone Island on the lip of Victoria Falls marking where Livingstone stood to get his first view of the falls.
- David Livingstone Primary School in Salisbury, Rhodesia (present-day Harare, Zimbabwe).
- David Livingstone Secondary School in Ntabazinduna about 40 km from Bulawayo, Zimbabwe.
- Livingstone House in Harare, Zimbabwe, designed by Leonora Granger.

New Zealand

- Livingstone Street in Westmere, Auckland
- Livingstone Road in Flaxmere, Hastings

==== Scotland ====
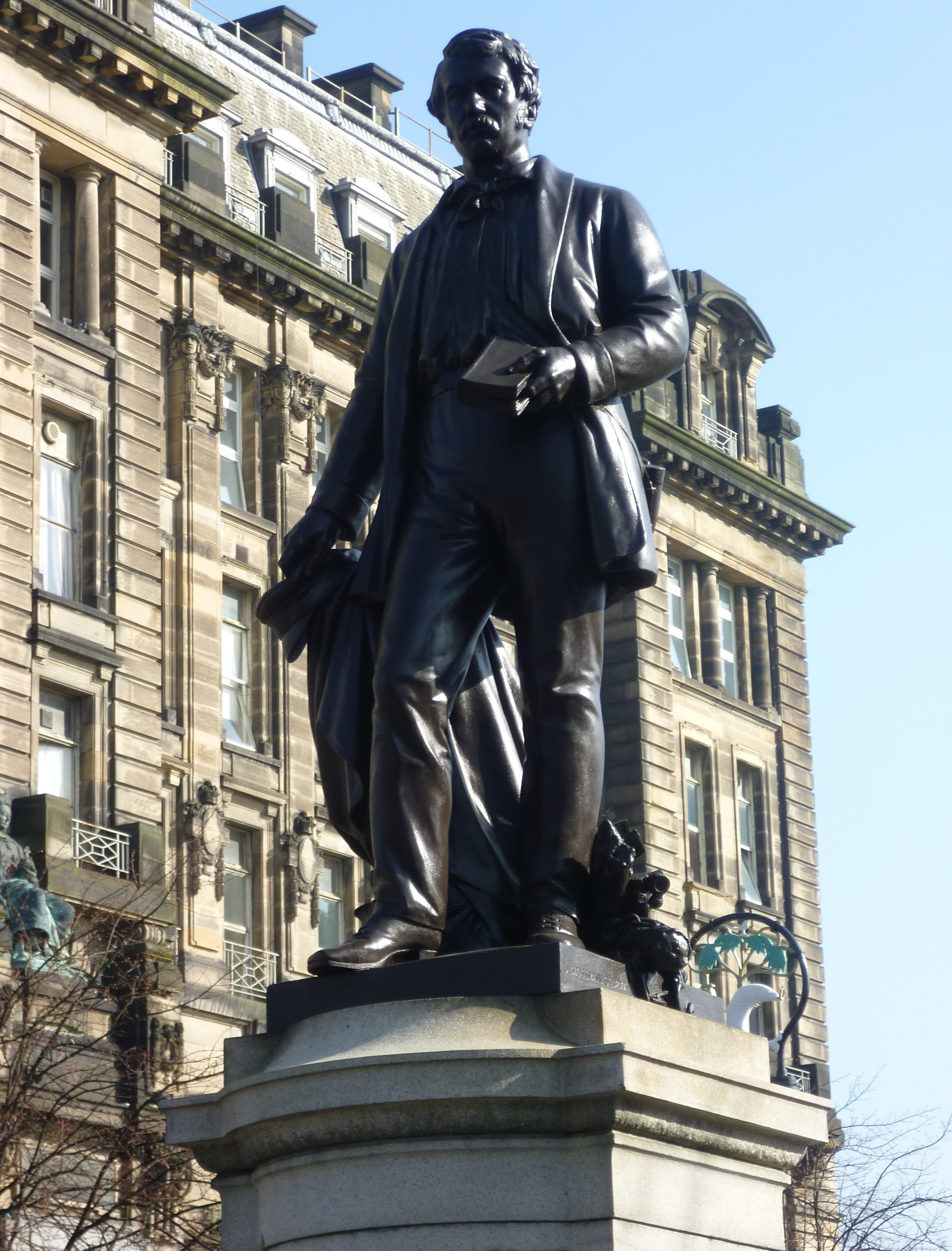
Livingstone statue, Glasgow

- The David Livingstone Birthplace Museum in Blantyre, South Lanarkshire, is a museum in his honour, operated by the David Livingstone Trust.
- David Livingstone Memorial Primary School in Blantyre.
- David Livingstone Memorial Church of the Church of Scotland in Blantyre.
- A statue of Livingstone in Cathedral Square, Glasgow.
- A statue of Livingstone in Princes Street Gardens, Edinburgh.
- A bust of Livingstone is among those of famous Scotsmen in the Wallace Monument near Stirling.
- Strathclyde University, Glasgow (which evolved from Anderson's University, later the Royal College of Science and Technology), commemorates him in the David Livingstone Centre for Sustainability and the Livingstone Tower where there is a statue of him in the building's foyer.
- The David Livingstone Room in the Royal College of Physicians and Surgeons of Glasgow. A portrait of Livingstone by Thomas Annan (a photograph painted over in oils) hangs outside the room.
- The David Livingstone (Anderson College) Memorial Prize in Physiology commemorates him at the University of Glasgow.
- Livingstone Place, a street in the Sciennes neighbourhood of Edinburgh.
- Livingstone Street in Addiewell.
- A memorial plaque commemorating the centenary of Livingstone's birth was dedicated in St. James's Congregational Church in Hamilton, the church he attended as a boy.
- Livingstone lived at 17 Burnbank Road in Hamilton, South Lanarkshire, for a short time in 1862. The house still stands and has a memorial plaque outside. He was awarded the Freedom of the Town of Hamilton.
- Livingstone Place, a street name in Galashiels, Scotland.

==== England ====
- A statue of David Livingstone stands in a niche on the outer wall of the Royal Geographical Society on Kensington Gore, London, looking out across Kensington Gardens. It was unveiled in 1953.
- Livingstone is one of the four houses at Eltham College.
- David Livingstone Primary School in Thornton Heath, South London.
- The former headquarters building of the London Missionary Society in Carteret Street, London, SW1 was named Livingstone House.
- There is a room named after Livingstone in Corpus Christi College, Oxford.
- In 1913, a plaque was unveiled on Livingstone Cottage in Hadley Green, High Barnet commemorating Livingstone's birth.
- A road in Stratford, London, was named after Livingstone, with the adjacent named after Henry Morgan Staley. Now situated adjacent to Rick Roberts Way. Both since demolished.

==== Canada ====
- The Livingstone Range of mountains in southern Alberta.
- David Livingstone Elementary School, Vancouver.
- David Livingstone Community School, Winnipeg.
- Bronze bust in Halifax, Nova Scotia.
- Gold bust in the city of Borden, Ontario.
- Livingstone Avenue in Barrie, Ontario.
- Livingstone Street, St. John's, Newfoundland and Labrador, Canada.

==== United States ====
- The town of Livingston, California
- Livingstone College, Salisbury, North Carolina.
- Livingstone Adventist Academy, Salem, Oregon.
- Livingston Falls, Busch Gardens, Tampa Bay

==== South America ====
- The Livingstone Healthservice in Jardín América, Misiones, Argentina is named in his honour.

=== Banknotes ===
In 1971–1998 Livingstone's image was portrayed on £10 notes issued by the Clydesdale Bank. He was originally shown surrounded by palm tree leaves with an illustration of African tribesmen on the back. A later issue showed Livingstone against a background graphic of a map of Livingstone's Zambezi expedition, showing the River Zambezi, Victoria Falls, Lake Nyasa and Blantyre, Malawi; on the reverse, the African figures were replaced with an image of Livingstone's birthplace in Blantyre, Scotland.

=== Science ===
The following species have been named in his honour:

- Livingston's cichlid, Nimbochromis livingstonii
- Livingstone's eland, Taurotragus oryx livingstonii
- Livingstone's fruit bat, Pteropus livingstonii

The mineral livingstonite is named in his honor. It was described in 1874 from Mexico.

=== Portrayal in film and books ===
- Livingstone has been portrayed by M. A. Wetherell in Livingstone (1925), Percy Marmont in David Livingstone (1936), Sir Cedric Hardwicke in Stanley and Livingstone (1939), Michael Gough in BBC television series The Search for the Nile (1971), Bernard Hill in Mountains of the Moon (1990) and Sir Nigel Hawthorne in the TV movie Forbidden Territory (1997).
- Out of Darkness, Shining Light (2019) by Petina Gappah is a fictionalized account of how Livingstone's body, papers, and maps traveled 1,500 miles across the continent of Africa, so his remains could be returned to England and his work preserved there.

== See also ==
- John McKendree Springer – pioneer missionary in central Africa
- Thomas Baines
- Livingstone Inland Mission
- History of Christianity in Zambia

== Sources and further reading ==
- Austin, Alvyn. "Discovering Livingstone" Christian History (1997) 16#4 pp. 10–19.
- Debenham, Frank. The Way to Ilala: David Livingstone's Pilgrimage (Longmans, Green & Co., 1955)
- Dritsas, Lawrence. Zambesi: David Livingstone and expeditionary science in Africa (Bloomsbury Publishing, 2020).
- Dugard, Martin (2012). Into Africa: The Epic Adventures Of Stanley And Livingstone. Transworld. ISBN 978-1-4464-3720-9.
- Dugard, Martin (2014). The Explorers: A Story of Fearless Outcasts, Blundering Geniuses, and Impossible Success. Simon and Schuster. ISBN 978-1-4516-7757-7.
- Gooding, Philip. "David Livingstone, UNESCO, and Nation-Building in 19th-21st-Century Scotland and East and Central Africa." Journal of Indian Ocean World Studies 5.2 (2021): 243–269. online
- Groop, Kim Stefan. "Exploring Africa in the Nordic Press: David Livingstone, Henry Stanley and the Popular Fascination with Exploration and Adventure in Africa in the Late 19th Century." in Modernity, Frontiers and Revolutions: Proceedings of the 4th International Multidisciplinary Congress (CRC Press, 2018). online
- Holmes, Timothy (1993). Journey to Livingstone: Exploration of an Imperial Myth. Edinburgh: Canongate Press. ISBN 978-0-86241-402-3; scholarly biography
- Jeal, Tim (1973). Livingstone. London: Heinemann. ISBN 978-0-434-37208-9., scholarly biography
- Jeal, Tim (1973b). Livingstone. New York: G. P. Putnum's Sons. ISBN 9780399112157. LCCN 73-82030., first American edition
- Jeal, Tim (2013). Livingstone: Revised and Expanded Edition. Yale University Press. ISBN 978-0-300-19100-4.
- Kilbride, Daniel. "The Old South Confronts the Dilemma of David Livingstone." Journal of Southern History (2016) 82#4 pp. 789–822; how he was seen in the American South.
- Lewis, Joanna. Empire of sentiment: the death of Livingstone and the myth of Victorian imperialism (Cambridge University Press, 2018).
- Liebenberg, Elri. "'I Will Open a Path into the Interior (of Africa), or Perish': David Livingstone and the Mapping of Africa." Cartographic Journal 58.1 (2021): 29–49.
- Livingstone, David (1857). Missionary Travels and Researches in South Africa: Including a Sketch of Sixteen Years' Residence in the Interior of Africa. London: Murray. p. Contents.
- Livingstone, D.; Livingstone, C. (1866). Narrative of an Expedition to the Zambesi and Its Tributaries: And of the Discovery of the Lakes Shirwa and Nyassa. 1858–1864. Harper & Brothers.
- Livingstone, David (1874). Waller, Horace (ed.). The Last Journals of David Livingstone, in Central Africa, from 1865 to His Death: Continued by a Narrative of His Last Moments and Sufferings, Obtained from His Faithful Servants Chuma and Susi; in Two Volumes. J. Murray.
- Livingstone, David and James I. Macnair (eds) (1954). Livingstone's Travels. London: J.M. Dent.
- Livingstone, David (1999) [1875]. Dernier Journal. Paris: Arléa; ISBN 2-86959-215-9 (in French)
- Livingstone, David; I. Schapera (ed.) David Livingstone: Family Letters 1841–1856. London: Chatto & Windus (1959) in two volumes.
- Livingstone, David; I. Schapera (ed.) Livingstone's African Journal 1853-1856. London: Chatto & Windus (1963) in two volumes.
- Livingstone, Justin D. "Livingstone's Life & Expeditions." in Adrian S. Wisnicki and Megan Ward, eds. Livingstone Online (2015) online.
- MacKenzie, John M. "David Livingstone, the Scottish cultural and political revival and the end of empire in Africa." in Scotland, empire and decolonisation in the twentieth century (Manchester University Press, 2017) pp. 180–199.
- Maclachlan, T. Banks. David Livingstone, Edinburgh: Oliphant, Anderson and Ferrier, 1901, ("Famous Scots Series").
- Martelli, George (1970). Livingstone's River: A History of the Zambezi Expedition, 1858–1864. London: Chatto & Windus. ISBN 978-0-7011-1527-2
- Milbrandt, Jay (2014). The Daring Heart of David Livingstone: Exile, African Slavery, and the Publicity Stunt that Saved Millions. Nashville, TN: Thomas Nelson. ISBN 978-1-59555-592-2. scholarly biography
- Mathews, Basil Joseph, Livingstone, the Pathfinder, illustrated by Ernest Prater (Oxford and London: Henry Frowde Oxford University Press, 1913)
- Mkenda, Festo. "A Protestant Verdict on the Jesuit Missionary Approach in Africa: David Livingstone and Memories of the Early Jesuit Presence in South Central Africa." in Encounters between Jesuits and Protestants in Africa (Brill, 2017). 59–79 online.
- Morrill, Leslie, and Madge Haines (1959). Livingstone, Trail Blazer for God. Mountain View: Pacific Press Publication Association.
- Pachai, Bridglal ed. (1973). Livingstone: Man of Africa. Memorial Essays 1873-1973. London: Longman; ISBN 0-582-64135-7
- Philip, M. NourbeSe (1991). Looking for Livingstone: An Odyssey of Silence. Stratford: The Mercury Press; ISBN 978-0-920544-88-4
- Rea, W. F. "Livingstone's Rhodesian Legacy." History Today (Sept 1973), Vol. 23 Issue 9, pp. 633–639 online.
- Ross, Andrew (2002). David Livingstone : Mission and Empire. London: Hambledon Continuum. ISBN 978-1-85285-285-6.
- Rotberg, Robert I. "His Brother's Keeper: Charles Livingstone and the 'Failure' of David Livingstone's Zambezi Expedition." Journal of Imperial and Commonwealth History 47.1 (2019): 76–99.
- Seaver, George. David Livingston: His Life and Letters (1957), a standard biography
- Shepperson, George. "David Livingstone 1813–1873: a centenary assessment." Geographical Journal (1973): 205–219. doi:10.2307/1796089
- Stanley, Henry M. How I Found Livingstone (1872) famous primary source.
- Stuart, John. "David Livingstone, British Protestant missions, memory and empire." in Dominik Geppert, ed., Sites of imperial memory (Manchester University Press, 2016).
- Waters, John (1996). David Livingstone: Trail Blazer. Leicester: Inter-Varsity; ISBN 978-0-85111-170-4
- Wisnicki, Adrian S. (2009). "Interstitial Cartographer: David Livingstone and the Invention of South Central Africa". Victorian Literature and Culture 37.1 (Mar.): 255–271.

This article incorporates text from a publication now in the public domain: Chisholm, Hugh, ed. (1911). "Cameron, Verney Lovett". Encyclopædia Britannica. Vol. 5 (11th ed.). Cambridge University Press. p. 109.
