= Evangelical Union (Scotland) =

The Evangelical Union was a 19th-century religious denomination which originated in the suspension of the Rev. James Morison, minister of a presbyterian United Secession congregation in Kilmarnock, Scotland, for certain views regarding faith, the work of the Holy Spirit in salvation, and the extent of the atonement, which were regarded by the supreme court of his church as anti-Calvinistic and heretical. It professed a creed which allowed them greater freedom as preachers of the Gospel.

Morison was suspended by the presbytery in 1841 after publishing in the previous year a pamphlet entitled The Question, 'What must I do to be saved?' Answered under the pseudonym Philanthropos, and soon withdrew from the United Secession Church. His father, who was minister at Bathgate, and two other ministers, were deposed not long afterwards for similar opinions. The four met at Kilmarnock on 16 May 1843 (two days before the Disruption of the Free Church), and, on the basis of certain doctrinal principles, formed themselves into an association under the name of the Evangelical Union, for the purpose of countenancing, counselling and otherwise aiding one another, and also for the purpose of training up spiritual and devoted young men to carry forward the work and pleasure of the Lord.

The doctrinal views of the new denomination gradually assumed a more decidedly anti-Calvinistic form, and they began also to find many sympathizers among the Congregationalists of Scotland. Nine students were expelled from the Congregational Academy for holding Morisonian doctrines, and in 1845 eight churches were disjoined from the Congregational Union of Scotland and formed a connection with the Evangelical Union.

The Union exercised no jurisdiction over the individual churches connected with it, and in this respect adhered to the Independent or Congregational form of church government; but those congregations which originally were Presbyterian vested their government in a body of elders. In 1889 the denomination numbered 93 churches; and in 1896, after prolonged negotiation, the Evangelical Union was incorporated with the Congregational Union of Scotland.

Keir Hardie was a lay preacher for the Evangelical Union; he converted to Christianity in 1897 and considered himself to be a Christian Socialist: "I have said, both in writing and from the platform many times, that the impetus which drove me first into the Labour movement, and the inspiration which has carried me on in it, has been derived more from the teachings of Jesus of Nazareth than from all other sources combined."

Eric Liddell, a famous Olympian and missionary, was involved with this group.

== See also ==
- Morisonianism

== Authorities ==
- The Evangelical Union Annual
- History of the Evangelical Union, by F Ferguson (Glasgow, 1876)
- The Worthies of the EU (1883)
- W Adamson, Life of Dr James Morison (1898)
