= James Morison (evangelical) =

Scottish cleric

- Born: February 14, 1816; Bathgate, Scotland
- Died: November 13, 1893

James Morison (1816–1893) was a Scottish cleric who became the founder of the Scottish Evangelical Union, also known as Morisonianism.

== Life ==
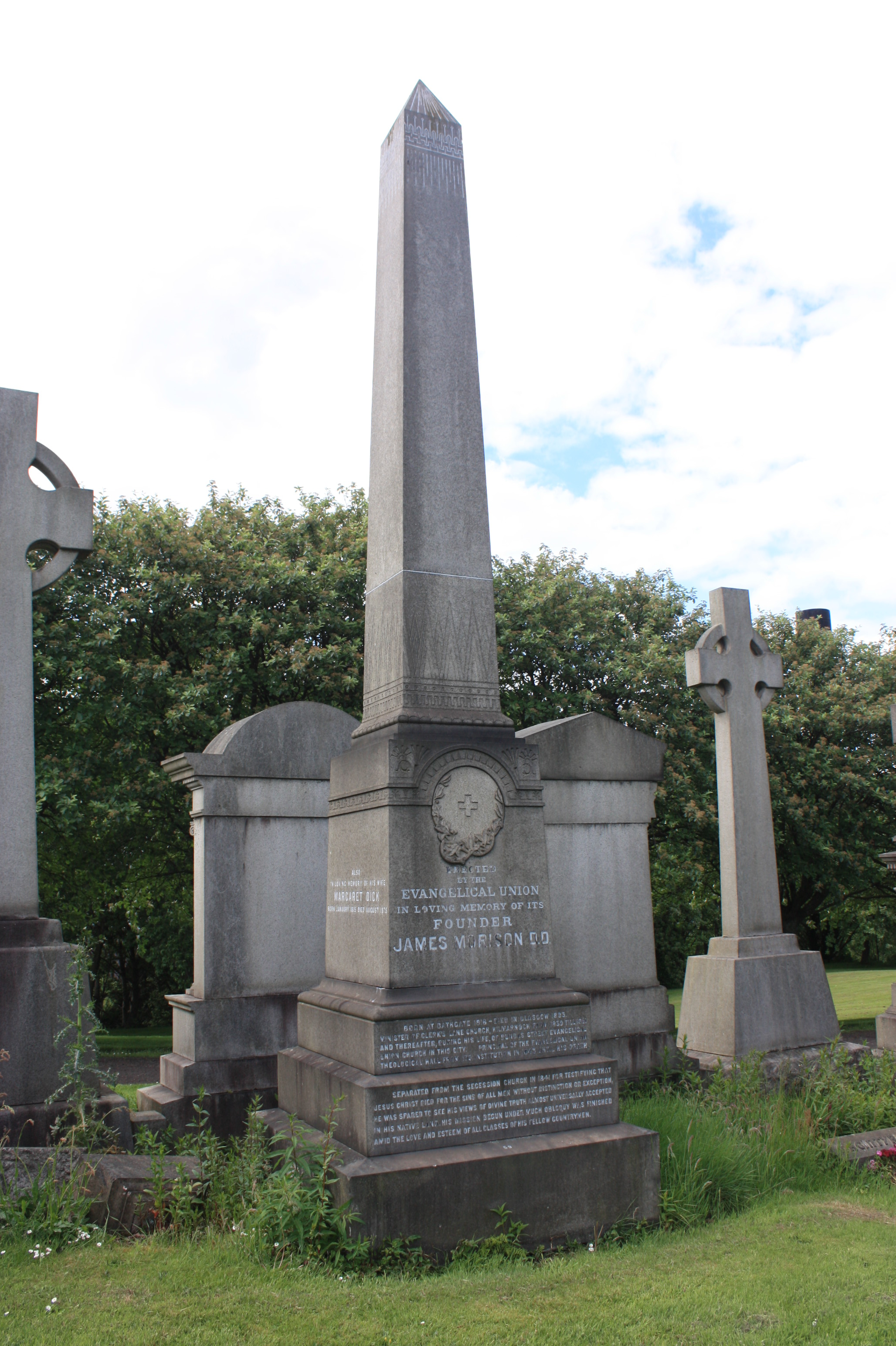
The grave of Rev James Morison, Glasgow Necropolis

Morison was born at Bathgate, Linlithgowshire, on 14 February 1816. He was the son of Robert Morison, minister of the United Secession Church. James Morison was educated at the University of Edinburgh where he attracted the notice of John Wilson ('Christopher North'). In 1834, Morison started training for the ministry in Edinburgh at the divinity hall of the United Secession Church, under John Brown, DD (1784–1858).

After receiving his licence (1839), Morison preached as a probationer at Cabrach in Banffshire and other places in Northern Scotland. His interest in the current movement of evangelical revival led him to study the doctrine of atonement; he embraced the view (rare among Calvinists) that Jesus Christ made atonement, not simply for the elect, but for all mankind.

Morison preached at Nairn, Tain, and Forres in Scotland, and at Lerwick in the Shetland Islands. He explained his philosophy in an 1840 tract titled 'The Question, "What must I do to be saved?" answered by Philanthropes.'

Also in 1840, Morison received a call to the United Secession Church, Clerk's Lane, Kilmarnock. On 29 September, his ordination day by Kilmarnock presbytery, two members with objections to Morison's views halted the proceedings. However, Morison was ordained after explaining to the members that he did not hold 'universal salvation'. Furthermore, he promised to suppress his tract. However, Morison allowed the reprinting of his offending tract by Thomas William Baxter Aveling, a congregational minister in London. Editions from this reprint were issued without Morison's permission in Dunfermline and Kilmarnock.

When the Kilmarnock presbytery learned about the printing of the tract, they suspended Morison from the ministry on 9 March 1841. He appealed to the synod, the supreme court of his church. Although Morison's cause was advocated by Brown, his tutor, the suspension was confirmed (11 June) on the motion of Hugh Heugh, DD.

Morison declined to recognise the decision of the synod; he was enthusiastically supported by his congregation, to which in two years he added 578 members. His father, who shared his views, was suspended in May 1842; and in May 1843 there were further suspensions of Alexander Gumming Rutherford of Falkirk, and John Guthrie of Kendal.

The four suspended ministers, in concert with nine laymen, at a meeting in Kilmarnock (16–18 May 1843), formed the Evangelical Union. They issued a statement of principles, showing a growth of opinion, inasmuch as they had now abandoned the Calvinistic doctrine of election. Their movement was reinforced by the expulsion (1 May 1844) of nine students from the theological academy of the congregationalists at Glasgow, under Ralph Wardlaw DD; and by the disownment (1845) of nine congregational churches holding similar views. From the 'relief church' in 1844 John Hamilton of Lauder joined the movement; as did William Scott in June 1845, on his expulsion from Free St Mark's, Glasgow. Not all who thus came over to Morison's views, and were hence known as Morisonians, became members of the evangelical union but they co-operated with it, and aided in the maintenance of a theological academy, established in 1843 by Morison, who held the chair of exegetical theology, and remained principal till his death.

The evangelical union adopted no uniform system of church government. The union was an advisory body, not a judicature, and it included congregations both of the presbyterian and the congregational order, thus reproducing the policy of the 'happy union' originated in London in 1690, but improving on it by the admission of lay delegates.

In 1851, Morison left Kilmarnock for Glasgow, where, in 1853, North Dundas Street Church was built for him. In 1855, his health temporarily gave way; from 1858 he was assisted by a succession of colleagues. He received the degree of DD in 1862 from the Adrian University in Michigan, and in 1883 from the University of Glasgow. In 1884, he retired from the active duties of the pastorate.

Public presentations were made to him in 1864, and in 1889 on the occasion of his ministerial jubilee. In April 1890, an ineffectual attempt was made in the Paisley presbytery of the United Presbyterian Church (into which the United Secession Church was incorporated in 1847) to recall the sentence of 1841; but in July 1893 Morison received a complimentary address signed by over 1900 laymen of the United Presbyterian Church.

He died on 13 November 1893 at his residence, Florentine Bank, Hillhead, Glasgow, and was buried on 16 November in the Glasgow Necropolis. The grave lies east of the summit.

== Theology ==
James Morison adopted the Governmental theory of atonement and firstly the theory of hypothetical redemption, a form of Amyraldism. After 1843, Morison changed his views for the Arminian position. He was the first to popularize Arminianism in Scotland.

== Family ==
He married, first, in 1841, Margaret Dick (1815-1875), daughter of Thomas Dick of Edinburgh, with whom he had three children, the eldest being Marjory, married to George Gladstone (his assistant from 1876 and later successor); his eldest son, Robert, died of congestion of the lungs in 1873 on his passage to Australia. He married, secondly, in 1877, Margaret Aughton of Preston, who survived him. His portrait, painted by Robert Gibb RSA, was presented to him in 1889.

== Works ==
- 'The Question, "What must I do?" ' &c., 1840; later edition, with title 'The Way of Salvation,' 1843, and 'Safe for Eternity' [1868].
- 'Not quite a Christian,' &c., 1840, often reprinted.
- 'The Nature of the Atonement,' &c., 1841, often reprinted.
- 'The Extent of the Atonement,' &c., 1841, often reprinted.
- 'Saving Faith,' &c., 1844, reprinted.
- 'A Gospel Alphabet,' &c., 1845.
- 'The Declaration, "I Pray not for the World,"' &c., 1845, reprinted.
- 'A Gospel Catechism,' &c., 1846, reprinted.
- 'The Followers of ... Timothy,' &c., 1847 (?).
- 'An Exposition of the Ninth Chapter of Paul's Epistle to the Romans,' &c., 1849; new edition, re-written, with addition of tenth chapter, 1888.
- 'Wherein the Evangelical Unionists are not Wrong,' &c., 1849.
- 'Vindication of the Universality of the Atonement,' &c., 1861 (a reply to 'The Atonement,' by Robert Smith Candlish).
- 'Biblical Help towards Holiness,' &c., 1861.
- 'Apology for ... Evangelical Doctrines,' &c., 1862.
- 'Questions on the Shorter Catechism,' &c., 1862.
- 'A Critical Exposition of the Third Chapter of Paul's Epistle to the Romans,' &c., 1866.
- 'A Practical Commentary on ... St. Matthew,' &c., 1870.
- 'A Practical Commentary on ... St. Mark,' &c., 1873.
- 'Exposition and Homiletics on Ruth,' &c., 1880 (in 'The Pulpit Commentary')
- 'St. Paul's Teaching on Sanctification,' &c., 1886.
- 'Sheaves of Ministry; Sermons and Expositions,' &c., 1890.

From 1854 to 1867 he edited and contributed largely to 'The Evangelical Repository,' a quarterly magazine.

== Notes and references ==
=== Sources ===
- This article incorporates text from a publication now in the public domain: Gordon, Alexander (1894). "Morison, James (1816-1893)". In Lee, Sidney (ed.). Dictionary of National Biography. Vol. 39. London: Smith, Elder & Co.
- Kirsch, Charles E. (1939). The theology of James Morison, with special reference to his theories of the atonement (PDF) (Doctor of Philosophy thesis). Edinburgh: University of Edinburgh.
