= Congregational Union of Scotland =

Protestant church in the Reformed tradition

The Congregational Union of Scotland was a Protestant church in the Reformed tradition.

The union was established in 1812, by 53 churches in Scotland. Its aim was to conduct missions in Scotland, and to support the existing Congregational churches. Much of the impetus for its formation came from Greville Ewing, who formed numerous congregations, and also the Glasgow Theological Academy. The union grew rapidly, with 72 member churches by 1824, and more than one hundred by the end of the decade.

In 1841, James Morison of the United Secession Church was accused of Arminianism, and was expelled. In 1843, he led four United Secession churches in forming the new Evangelical Union. Two years later, this was joined by nine Congregational Union churches who supported John Kirk. Initially strongly Calvinist, the Evangelical Union moved away from this, and focused its activity on promoting abstentionism. By 1896, it had 98 member churches, and it decided to rejoin the Congregational Union.

The Congregational Union first discussed a possible merger with the Congregational Union of England and Wales in 1929, but it ultimately preferred to remain independent. It was a founder member of the Scottish Churches Council, and later supplied the secretary of the multilateral church conventions which ran from the 1960s to the 1990s. The church also played a leading role in Christian Aid Scotland.

In 1928, the Congregational Union appointed the first woman minister of any Scottish church, Vera Finlay.

In 2000, the union merged into the United Reformed Church, with a minority of churches dissenting and instead joining the Congregational Federation.
