= Ralph Wardlaw =

Scottish Presbyterian clergyman (1779-1853)

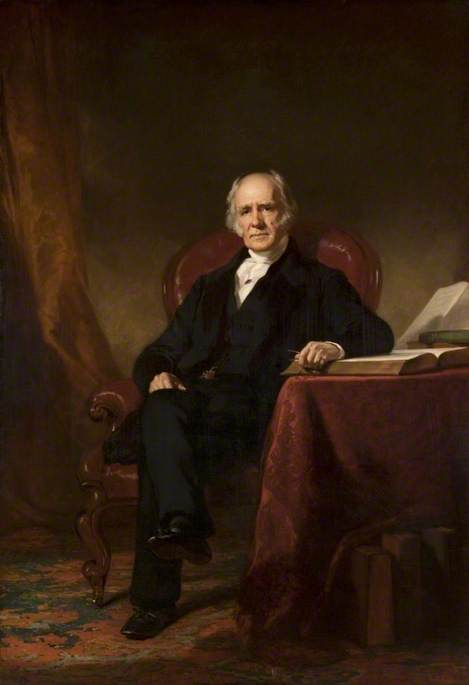
- Born: 22 December 1779; Dalkeith
- Died: 15 December 1853 (aged 73)
- Resting place: Glasgow Necropolis
- Education: University of Glasgow
- Occupations: Clergyman and writer
- Spouse: Jane Smith

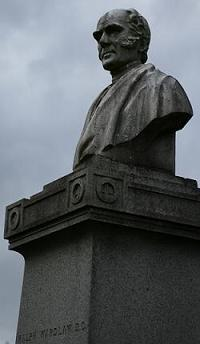
The statue of Wardlaw at his grave in the Glasgow Necropolis, overlooking the city's cathedral.

Ralph Wardlaw (22 December 1779 – 15 December 1853) was a Scottish Congregationalist minister and writer. He was known as an abolitionist campaigner.

== Life ==
He was born in Dalkeith, just south of Edinburgh, but his family moved to Glasgow when he was six months old. His father was a prosperous merchant and civic magistrate, whilst his mother was the daughter of the Rev. James Fisher and the granddaughter of Ebenezer Erskine, two of the founding ministers of the United Secession Church. At the age of eight he was enrolled at the High School of Glasgow for four years, before being accepted as a student of theology at the University of Glasgow, aged twelve.

Despite his strong familial connections to the Secession Church, shortly after his University studies were complete he turned to Independent Congregationalism, as introduced to Scotland (from England) by James and Robert Haldane. He was ordained in 1803 by Rev. Greville Ewing, the popular minister of Lady Glenorchy's church, shortly after a chapel had been erected for him by his friends and family in Albion Street. Although his first congregation numbered only 61, his success as a preacher was sufficient that by 1811 he and Ewing founded Glasgow's first academy for congregationalist theology students.

In 1818 he moved his congregation to a new church in West George Street capable of holding more than 1,500 people, where he remained until the closure of his ministerial life. In the same year he was awarded an honorary doctorate (DD) from Yale University.

Wardlaw strongly influenced David Livingstone, who attended his lectures in divinity, and was inspired by his campaigns against slavery to fight the African slave trade during his years as a missionary and explorer.

He died at home Provan Hall, Easterhouse near Baillieston in 1853.

Wardlaw was married to his cousin, Jane Smith, for almost fifty years until his death aged 74. He is buried on the brow of the hill at the Glasgow Necropolis, overlooking Glasgow Cathedral.

== Publications ==
- (1818) "An Essay on Associations for Relief of the Poor"
- (1821) "Lectures on the Book of Ecclesiastes"
- (1833) "Discourses on the Sabbath"
- (1834) "Christian Ethics, or Moral Philosophy on the Principles of Divine Revelation"
- Lectures on Female Prostitution: Its Nature, Extent, Effects, Guilt, Causes, and Remedy. Glasgow: James Maclehose. 1842. pp. 163pp.
- Lectures on Magdalenism: Its Nature, Extent, Effects, Guilt, Causes, and Remedy. Glasgow: Redfield. 1843. pp. 172pp.
- (1845) "Life of Joseph, and Last Years of Jacob"
- (1856) "Systematic Theology", 3 vols., edited by James R. Campbell (Edinburgh: Adam and Charles Black, 1856). Volume 1, Volume 2, Volume 3
- (1852) "On Miracles"
- (1869) "Lectures on the Prophecies of Zechariah"
- (1869) "Lectures on the Book of Proverbs" 3 vols. Volume 1 , Volume 2 , Volume 3
- (1869) "Lectures on the Epistle to the Romans" 3 vols. Volume 1, Volume 2, Volume 3

== Sources ==
- Aird, Andrew (1894). Glimpses of Old Glasgow. Glasgow: Aird & Coghill. pp. 369–372.
- "Significant Scots: Ralph Wardlaw", Electric Scotland
