= William Anderson (missionary) =

English Christian missionary

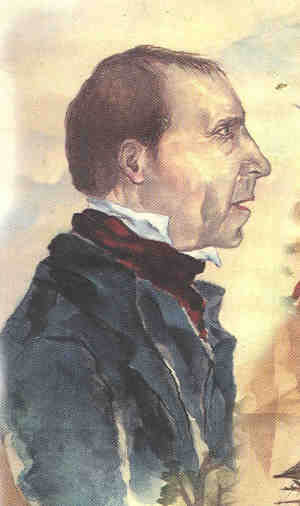
- Missionary to Southern Africa
- Born: 1 December 1769; London, United Kingdom
- Died: 24 September 1852; Pacaltsdorp, South Africa
- Other names: Reverend William Anderson of Griquatown
- Occupation: Missionary
- Known for: One of the first Christian missions to the area

William Anderson (1 December 1769 – 24 September 1852) was an English Christian missionary who relocated to South Africa under the auspices of the London Missionary Society. He was one of the earliest missionaries in the region. Anderson was instrumental in the foundation of the South African town Griquatown.

== Early life ==
Anderson was born in London, the eldest son of silk merchant William Anderson who was originally from Aberdeen. His mother was Catherine Turner who came from Devon. Like his parents, William was active in the Nonconformist movement. He was greatly influenced by the preaching of John Wesley and by the call of William Carey for the church to take the gospel to those who had never heard. Anderson was at the founding of the London Missionary Society (LMS) in September 1795 and he signed up for missionary service wherever the Society felt he could be of use. Due to family needs, his departure was delayed, but at the age of 30 he sailed for the Cape on 10 April 1800.

== Missionary work in Griquatown ==
Anderson was one of four new recruits in the second group sent to the Cape by the LMS. He arrived in Cape Town in September 1800 and some months later, in 1801, moved beyond the borders of the Cape Colony and settled amongst the Griqua people north of the Orange River. He and a Dutch colleague Nicholas Kramer encouraged the Griqua, who had hitherto lived mainly by hunting, to settle at a place they called Klaarwater (meaning Clear Water) and plant gardens and grow wheat and other crops. Klaarwater, later renamed Griquatown, became a centre for agriculture (as a result of irrigation) and education and a thriving church was established.

Anderson briefly returned to Cape Town where he met and married Johanna Maria Schonken, the daughter of descendants of early Dutch and French Huguenot settlers. Anderson and his wife became an integral part of the life of Griquatown. Johanna Anderson worked with the women in teaching hygiene and dress-making. Anderson befriended local chiefs such as Adam Kok and Barend Barends and baptised them into the Christian faith. Another younger leader during Anderson's time in Griquatown was Andries Waterboer who later would head the independent British Colony Griqualand. Whilst serving amongst the Griqua the Andersons also worked with the Khoikhoi and had considerable contact with the Tswana people. In 1813, Anderson together with LMS colleagues John Campbell and James Read, Griquatown colleague Lambert Jansz and Griqua chiefs Cornelius and Adam Kok, presented the Christian gospel for the first time to the Tswana king, Chief Mothibi. Fellow LMS missionaries Mary and Robert Moffat were in close contact with the Andersons during his time in Griquatown.

== Issues with Cape authorities ==
For some years Anderson found himself wedged between the Griqua and the demands of the Cape government. He tried to keep good relations with the authorities in the Cape upon whom the community depended for supplies of gunpowder (necessary for hunting and protection) and for permits (which Anderson was allowed to issue) for those Griquas wishing to travel to the Cape or engage in trade with farmers. However, successive governors were not always favourable to the work of the missionaries and Anderson had often been criticized by the authorities in the Cape. In 1814 Governor John Cradock demanded that Anderson make sure that "all deserters criminals, slaves, (Hottentot or Bastard)"{quote taken from LMS reports in the archives of London University School of Oriental and African Studies} who had escaped north of the Orange River to Griquatown should be returned to the Cape Colony. In addition, the Governor demanded that Anderson arrange for twenty local youths, between the ages of 17 and 20, to join the Cape Hottentots Regiment. Anderson was outraged and found it extremely hard to explain these demands to the Griqua as few had any loyalty to the Cape which lay hundreds of miles to the south.

When Anderson wrote to the Cape authorities to argue his case he received an even stronger reply from the new governor Lord Charles Somerset on 4 July 1814. Somerset wrote "...it is true that you may urge that your Institution is without the Colonial border and therefore not properly subject to the Government of this territory, but it is to be remarked that you have on every occasion received protection from the Colony..."{LMS archives SOAS, London} Somerset went on to threaten that all communication with the Cape would be broken if Anderson did not cooperate.

It became clear to Anderson that the future of his work with the Griqua was under threat. He saw that threat as coming from his own countrymen and he began to doubt their claims to be civilised and Christians. Towards the end of 1814, Anderson himself went to Cape Town and met with Governor Lord Somerset to intercede on behalf of the Griqua and the community in Griquatown. An uneasy truce was the result, but the authorities in the Cape were no longer as favourable towards Anderson and the LMS in general.

== Problems for the missionaries in Griquatown ==
Trouble surfaced in Griquatown when a European outlaw from justice in the Cape, Conrade Buys, who a large following amongst the Khoikhoi (and several wives in addition to his Dutch wife) came to the area north of the Orange River. Buys was a gifted orator who was passionately opposed to the British and played on the dissatisfaction of the Griqua people. He asked the local people why they should worry about Anderson and their traditional chiefs when they could be free and when it was easier and more profitable to trade "illegally" with farmers in the remote border areas of the Cape Colony. He asked them why they should bother to get a letter or pass from Anderson. By 1816 a group of disaffected Griqua, known collectively as the Hartenaars, moved further east to the Harts River. A few years later many Hartenaars did return to Griquatown but the conflict between some of their leaders and also some of their own fellow Griqua took much longer to heal.

Anderson was overburdened by his missionary responsibilities and coping with the political tensions over the Hartenaars. It was an issue Robert Moffat clearly pointed out; there had to be "a clear division between the work of the Church and the running of what amounted to the emerging Griqua state." Unknown to Anderson, Moffat and John Campbell, James Read was complicating the local situation by spending time with certain Griqua leaders and undermining Anderson's reputation. Tensions increased following a major blow to the reputation and work of the LMS in southern Africa when in 1817 it was discovered that Read had committed adultery. By early in 1820, William and Johanna Anderson felt they needed to leave Griquatown to avoid being a stumbling block for the Church and community moving forward. It was a painful parting and many Griqua were sad to see their pastor and leader leave after almost 20 years amongst them. Subsequent events proved the problems of Griquatown could not be solved simply by the departure of the Andersons. In terms of organization and governance, there had to be a separation between Church and "state" even if the community at large and her leaders held onto their Christian faith and values.

== Life after Griquatown ==
William and Johanna Anderson relocated to the southern Cape. They had a brief tenure on an LMS station in Zuurbraak and then took over the work in Pacaltsdorp, near George. There followed a further 30 years of extremely fruitful service amongst the Khoikhoi and mixed race people (later called Cape Coloureds) in a scenic part of South Africa. Pacaltsdorp became one of the most successful stations of the LMS. On 19 June 1825 the great stone church in Pacaltsdorp was officially opened. It is now a provincial heritage site.

Johanna Anderson died in Pacaltsdorp in 1848 and William Anderson died four years later in 1852. Their children were active both in Pacaltsdorp and other centres with youngest son Bartholemew Ebenezer becoming a leading pastor in the Congregational Church in Oudtshoorn. A multi-racial church, it was one of the largest at the time in South Africa with some 2000 members.
