= Alan Butler =

Alan John Butler, a Director of the Kuruman Moffat Mission in Kuruman, South Africa, and Canon of Kimberley Cathedral, was a priest who served in the Diocese of Kimberley and Kuruman for a major part of the second half of the twentieth century. He was responsible for the restoration of the historic Moffat Mission precinct which became renowned as a conservation area and as a beacon of hope in the troubled last years of Apartheid. He was born in the United Kingdom in 1930 and died at Wimborne on 13 January 2011. He continued the missionary work at Kuruman that was conducted by Reverend Robert Moffat for more than fifty years.

== Early training and ministry in South Africa ==
Butler was trained at Kelham Theological College from 1951 and was in due course ordained deacon at Southwark Cathedral in 1956 prior to serving in the Diocese of Bloemfontein in South Africa.

He was ordained priest in Bloemfontein in 1957. In 1960 he transferred to the Diocese of Kimberley and Kuruman to serve as a curate at St Cyprian's Cathedral in Kimberley.

Butler commenced his ministry amongst the Tswana of the Northern Cape when Bishop Philip Wheeldon sent him to Kuruman in 1961 as Rector and Director of St Paul's, a vast mission district at the edge of the Kalahari. His wife, Hilda, whom he married at the Moffat Mission Church in Kuruman in 1964, has recalled that "he hitch hiked with one suitcase along a dirt road from Kimberley to Kuruman. The chap who gave him a lift bought him an old Chev car." Butler would serve in the area from 1961 to 1965, doubling up as Director of the Bothithong Mission from 1963 to 1965. "He loved the Northern Cape and her people and said that it was the 'real' Africa."

Bishop Wheeldon appointed Fr Butler as his Honorary Chaplain in 1963–1965.

== Botswana ==
Butler was sent by his Bishop in 1965 to Bechuanaland Protectorate (still within the Diocese of Kimberley and Kuruman) to the yet-to-be-built Gaborone, a capital city for the anticipated independent state of Botswana. There he was to found and build Trinity Church, an ecumenical venture, as well as being involved in such projects as starting up a Co-op food store and initiating the start of a multi-national school. He was also at one time deputy mayor of Gaborone. Fr Butler remained there until 1970, a historic period when the protectorate became independent as Botswana (1966) and when church jurisdiction was transferred to the Diocese of Matabeleland (also from 1966).

Butler subsequently returned for a time to England to serve as vicar at St James, Fletchampstead, Diocese of Coventry.

== Kuruman Moffat Mission ==
In 1979 Butler volunteered to work once again in "his beloved Kalahari", South Africa. Bishop Graham Chadwick took up his offer and invited him to work again in the Kuruman area as a priest in the Diocese of Kimberley and Kuruman and to commence the massive task of restoring the Kuruman Moffat Mission of which he became Director. Butler worked there for the next 14 years.

Previously the notorious Apartheid Group Areas Act had decreed the historic Kuruman Mission site to be in a whites only area. This effectively divided the people from their church, with the latter falling into disuse. Butler's predecessor, the Revd Humphrey Thompson, ran the mission for fifty years (as had Moffat) – and did what he could to maintain mission activities during these troubled times.

Upon Butler's appointment and through the 1980s the Moffat Mission was transformed into being, as he put it, "a focus for new hope in a disturbing age." One priority was to restore and conserve the buildings and their setting, promoting tourism to help generate an income and awareness about the work of the Mission. He developed a retreat and the Maphakela conference centre, cultivating a Moffat Mission Community which included a network of helpers from near and far. Fr Butler, who wore a beard "every bit as dramatic as Moffat's," as was often said, wrote and published extensively on the mission and its history. He also amassed a collection of memorabilia, artefacts, paintings, photographs, documents and books associated with the history of the Mission, and he was responsible for developing a museum within the 4 hectare precinct.

A crowning achievement in 1996 was the return of Moffat's printing press, from the Africana Library in Kimberley, for which he had campaigned tirelessly since taking up Directorship of the Mission.

In 1994, in South Africa's first democratic elections, Butler was asked to be an Electoral Officer for the Northern Cape. He had always been interested in politics and this was, as his wife has put it, "the cherry on the cake."

== Retirement at Wimborne ==
Fr Butler was made a Canon of Kimberley Cathedral before he and his wife Hilda retired to Wimborne in the south of England in 1995. There he became part of the Minster staff, where he was also an enthusiastic bellringer, practising a skill he had learned in his youth. He was a member of the Ancient Society of College Youths, the premier change ringing society in the City of London, to which he was elected in 1947. Amongst his other accomplishments were sign-writing and book-binding.
