= Mary Moffat Livingstone =

Wife of explorer David Livingstone (1821–1862)

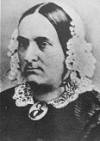
- Undated photo of Moffat
- Born: 12 April 1821; Griquatown, Northern Cape Province, South Africa
- Died: 27 April 1862 (aged 41); Chupanga, Portuguese East Africa
- Occupation: Linguist
- Spouse: David Livingstone (m. 1845)
- Children: 6
- Parents: Robert Moffat (father); Mary Smith (mother)

Mary Livingstone (née Moffat; 12 April 1821 – 27 April 1862) was a Scottish linguist and the wife of the missionary David Livingstone. She was an experienced traveller who knew several African languages and managed the family's household affairs, including missionary stations and infant school.

Mary was fluent in Tswana, the language of the BaTswana people. Her linguistic abilities and her experience of working in remote outposts in Southern Africa made it possible for the couple to survive.

== Biography ==
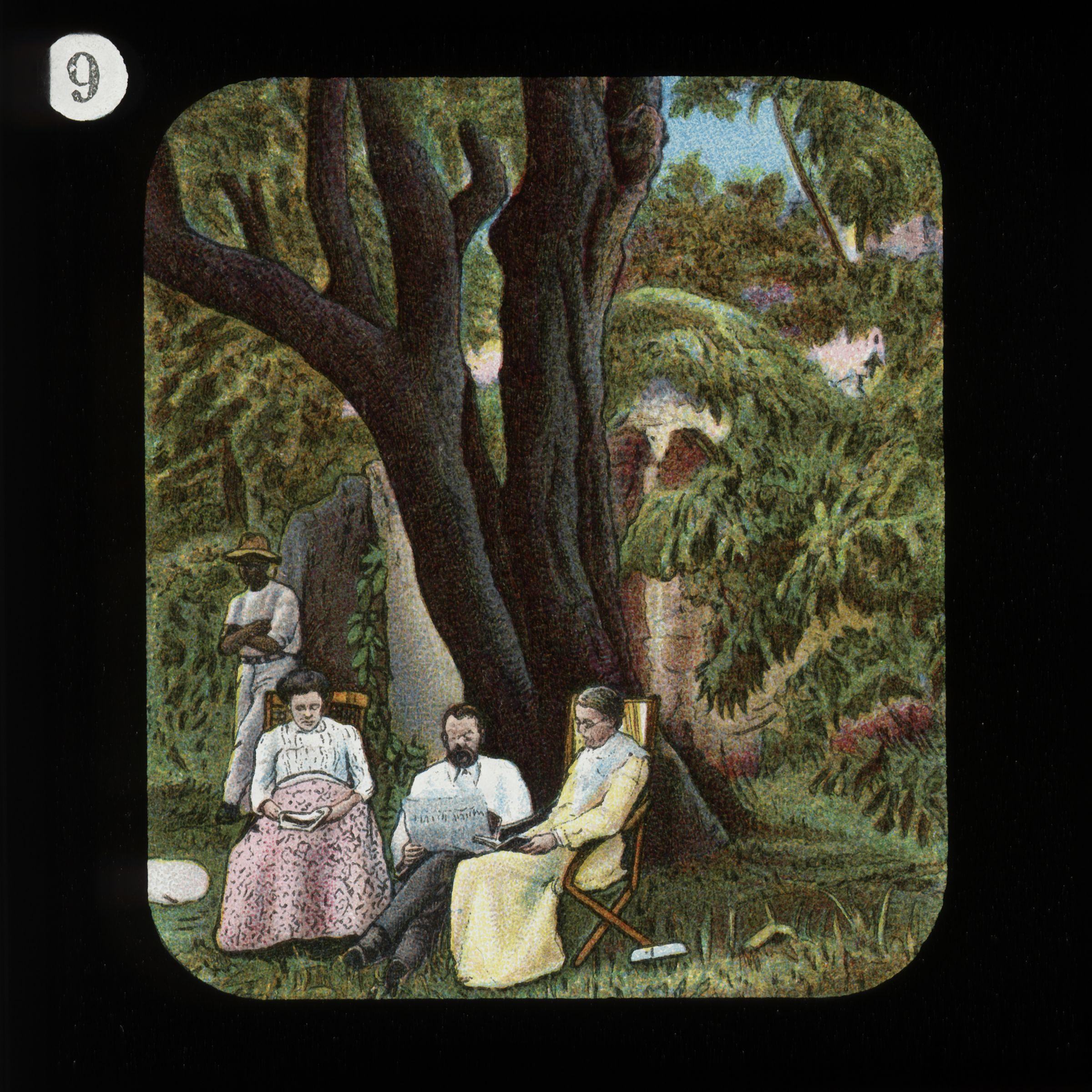
Mary Moffat sitting under an almond tree at Kuruman with her parents Robert and Mary Moffat. (National Portrait Gallery, London)

Mary Moffat was the first of ten children born to Robert Moffat, a Scottish missionary, and his wife Mary (née Smith, 1795–1870). Mary was born in Griquatown, about 93 miles west of Kimberley. She spent her early life at the mission at Kuruman. From 1839 to 1843 she lived in Britain with her parents. Her father, Robert Moffat, was a Scottish Congregationalist missionary who worked among the Bechuana people at Kuruman.

When the family returned to South Africa and were on the long ox-cart trek to Kuruman, Livingstone rode out to meet them in January 1844 when they reached the Vaal River. While he mostly talked to her father as they sat in the cart during the seventeen or eighteen days journey to the mission, this was the first time he and Mary became acquainted.

She married Livingstone on 9 January 1845, despite her mother's disapproval. The couple lived initially in Mabotsa before moving to Chonuane and then to Kolobeng, North West Province. Her knowledge of several African languages helped the couple in their travels. She was more widely known in southern Africa than Livingstone, so he was often introduced as the husband of Mary Moffat. She and Livingstone crossed the Kalahari Desert twice, in 1849 and 1850. Their fourth child, Elizabeth, was born shortly after they had returned from the first of these journeys and died six weeks later. Her family blamed Livingstone for this death. Her fifth child was born on their second journey, delivered by her husband.

She did not go on Livingstone's first expedition to the Zambezi, 1853–1856, because she lived in Britain for four years for the sake of the children's education and safety: travelling across a desert with small children, not enough water, no fruit or vegetables and sickness owing to malaria was unsustainable. In 1852 Mary returned to Scotland with her four children but staying with relatives proved difficult. After several moves she eventually moved to Kendal, where she lived with Charles and Susanna Braithwaite, evangelical Quakers and supporters of the London Missionary Society. Dr Livingstone and Mary's parents were missionaries of this society. When Livingstone returned to England a national hero he stayed with the Braithwaites on a number of occasions. Livingstone joined his wife in Britain from 1856 to 1858.

In 1858, she went with Livingstone on the second Zambezi expedition, but became pregnant on the journey out and left the expedition at Cape Town in the Spring to go to her parents' home in Kuruman for the birth of their sixth child, Anna Mary, in November. She went back to Britain, but had unhappy times.

She returned to Africa as one of the passengers, along with the wife and daughter of Bishop MacKenzie, on HMS Gorgon taking the replacement river steamer Lady Nyassa (in sections) out to the expedition. They reached the Zambesi on 8 January 1862. Due to delays, Livingstone's steamer Pioneer arrived three days later. By then, Gorgon had gone to sea. Gales stopped the ship from returning until the end of the month, so Livingstone and Mary were at last reunited on the morning of 1 February. He had asked for the new steamer to be delivered assembled; there were now delays and difficulties while getting the sections up to Shupanga for assembly.

A year earlier, Livingstone had gone upriver with Bishop MacKenzie to set up a mission at Magomero; news now arrived that MacKenzie had died. The Livingstones accompanied the bereaved MacKenzies to the mouth of the Zambezi, but storms had forced Gorgon to put to sea, and they waited there in Pioneer from 17 March to 2 April before the bereaved were embarked, and the Livingstones returned to Shupanga. The waiting had exposed Mary to dangers of fever.

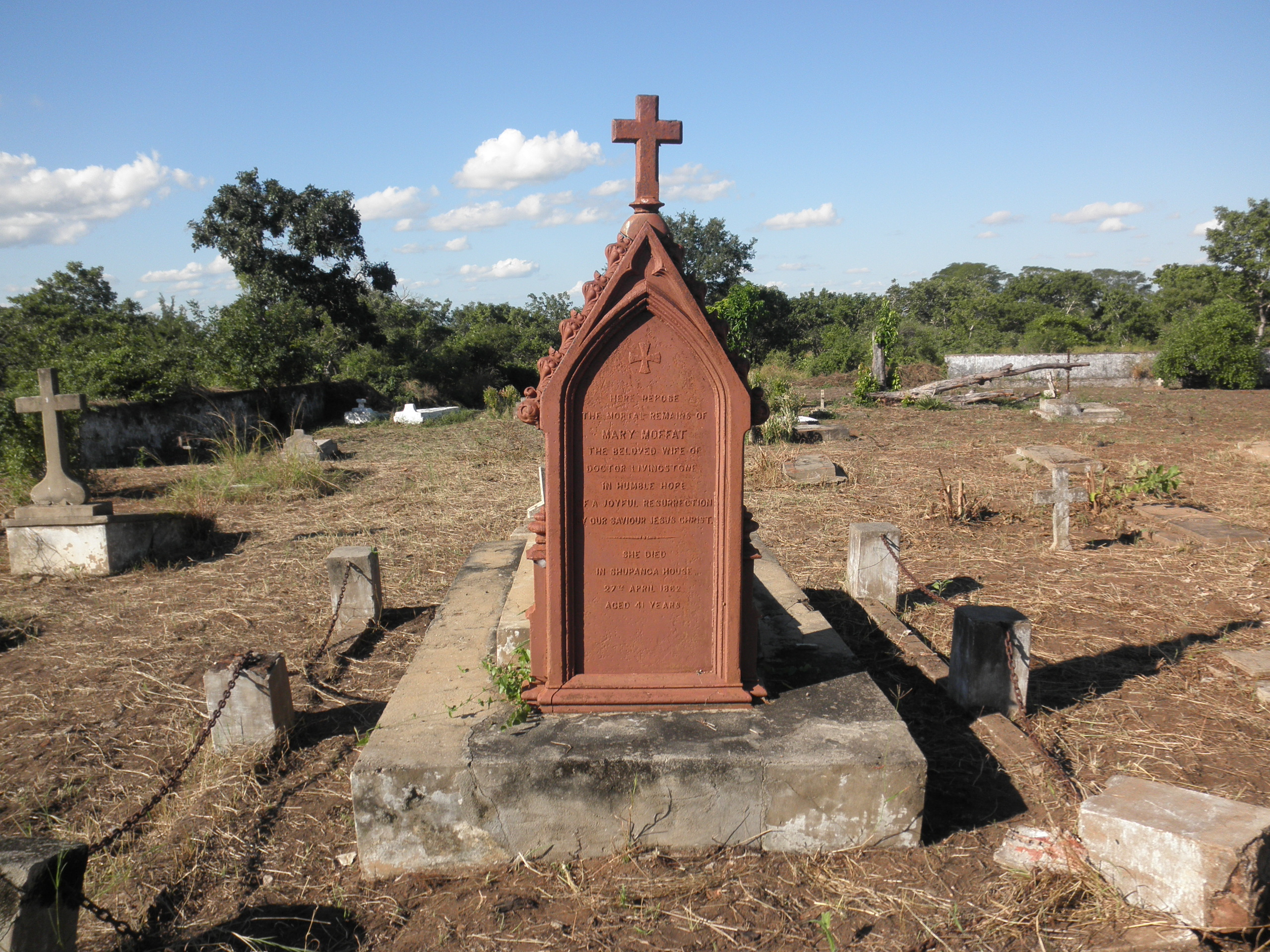
The gravestone of Mary Livingstone in Chupanga (Shupanga). The inscription reads: Here repose the mortal remains of Mary Moffat, the beloved wife of Doctor Livingstone, in humble hope of a joyful resurrection by our saviour Jesus Christ. She died in Shupanga House, 27 April 1862, aged 41 years.

== Death ==
She fell ill with malaria on 22 April 1862 at Shupanga. Her condition worsened despite medical attention from her husband, and she died on 27 April. Mary is buried in Chupanga, on the bank of the Zambezi River.

After her death, Mary's husband David wrote the following:

We have not the proper chemicals to make it back - I placed a cross over her tomb a sacred symbol in these regions and have sent for a grave stone with the inscription on one side English and on the other Portuguese "Here repose the mortal remains of Mary Moffat Livingstone in hope of a joyful resurrection by our Saviour Jesus Christ - died 27th April 1862 aged 41 years"

Mary's story is featured as part of the David Livingstone Birthplace Museum, in Blantyre, Scotland, which was renovated and reopened in 2021.

== Children ==
Mary and David had six children:

1. Robert, 1845
2. Agnes, born in 1847, who married Alexander Low Bruce in 1875 and died in 1912.
3. Thomas, 1848
4. Elizabeth, 1850-1850
5. William Oswell, born in 1851, married Catherine Jane Anderson in 1875 and died in 1890.
6. Anna Mary, born in 1858, married Frank Wilson in 1881 and died in 1939.
