= John Moffat (missionary) =

British missionary and imperial agent in southern Africa

John Smith Moffat
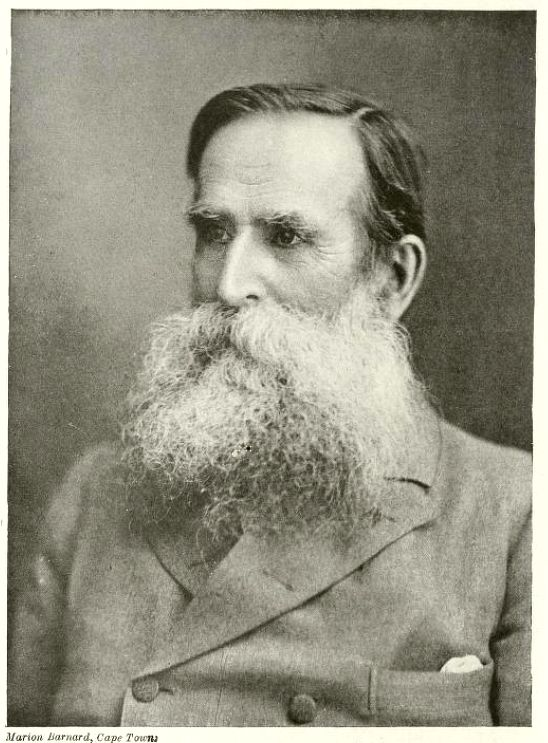
- Missionary to Africa

Personal life
- Born: March 3, 1835 Ormiston, East Lothian, Scotland
- Died: December 25, 1918 (aged 83)
- Occupation: Missionary in Africa, author
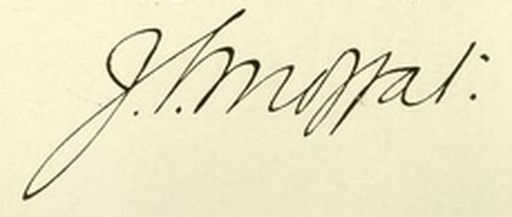
- Signature

Religious life
- Religion: Methodist Episcopal Church

John Smith Moffat (1835–1918) was a British missionary and imperial agent in southern Africa, the son of missionary Robert Moffat and Mary Moffat. He was the brother-in-law of missionary explorer David Livingstone. He is known for his various publications and essays detailing his journeys and experiences in Africa and the eastern Mediterranean.

Like his famous father, Moffat was a Congregationalist minister affiliated with the London Missionary Society but he became involved in British colonial missionary work, particularly in Matabeleland, later part of Southern Rhodesia, now Zimbabwe. With a subsidy from David Livingstone he was provided the money to marry Emily Unwin and go with her to South Africa. His missionary work included helping to start the first mission in Matabeleland in 1859 at Inyati. In 1865 he took over the running of his father's mission in Kuruman. In 1879 he resigned from the missionary society and joined the British Bechuanaland colonial service.

In 1888 at the instigation of Cecil Rhodes he was sent to Matabeleland to use his father's reputation to persuade its king Lobengula to sign a treaty of friendship with Britain and to look favorably on Rhodes' later approach for the Rudd Concession mining rights. Moffat discovered later the extent of Rhodes' deception of Lobengula and the deceit behind numerous concessions negotiated by Rhodes' British South Africa Company, BSAC. He fell out with Rhodes when the latter provoked Lobengula into the First Matabele War so he could take that country. In 1893 Moffat exposed the trickery behind the BSAC Bosman Concession in Ngamiland, which was abandoned as a result. In 1894 when the BSAC police clashed with warriors of the Bamangwato king Khama III in Bechuanaland, he warned that Rhodes' next victim was Khama, a British ally. But Moffat's boss, Shippard, was Rhodes's agent, and he dismissed Moffat.

== Books in English ==
- Travels in the Eastern Mediterranean first published 1889
- The Lives of Robert and Mary Moffat. New York, NY: A. C. Armstrong & Son. 1885.
- Moffat, John Smith (1900). The black man and the war. Cape Town: The South African Vigilance Committee.

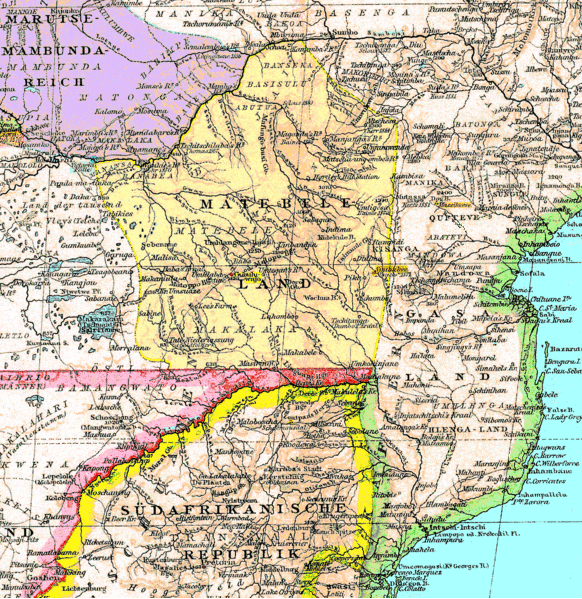
South-East Africa, 1887

== See also ==
- William Taylor (missionary) — Missionary in South Africa in 1866

== Sources ==
- Dictionary of South African biography: Moffat, John Smith. Vol. I. Nasional Boekhandel Bpk. for National Council for Social Research, Dept. of Higher Education. 1968.
- "Moffat, John Smith". Dictionary of Christian Biography. Archived from the original on 9 May 2012.
