= Inyathi High School =

High school in Inyathi, Zimbabwe

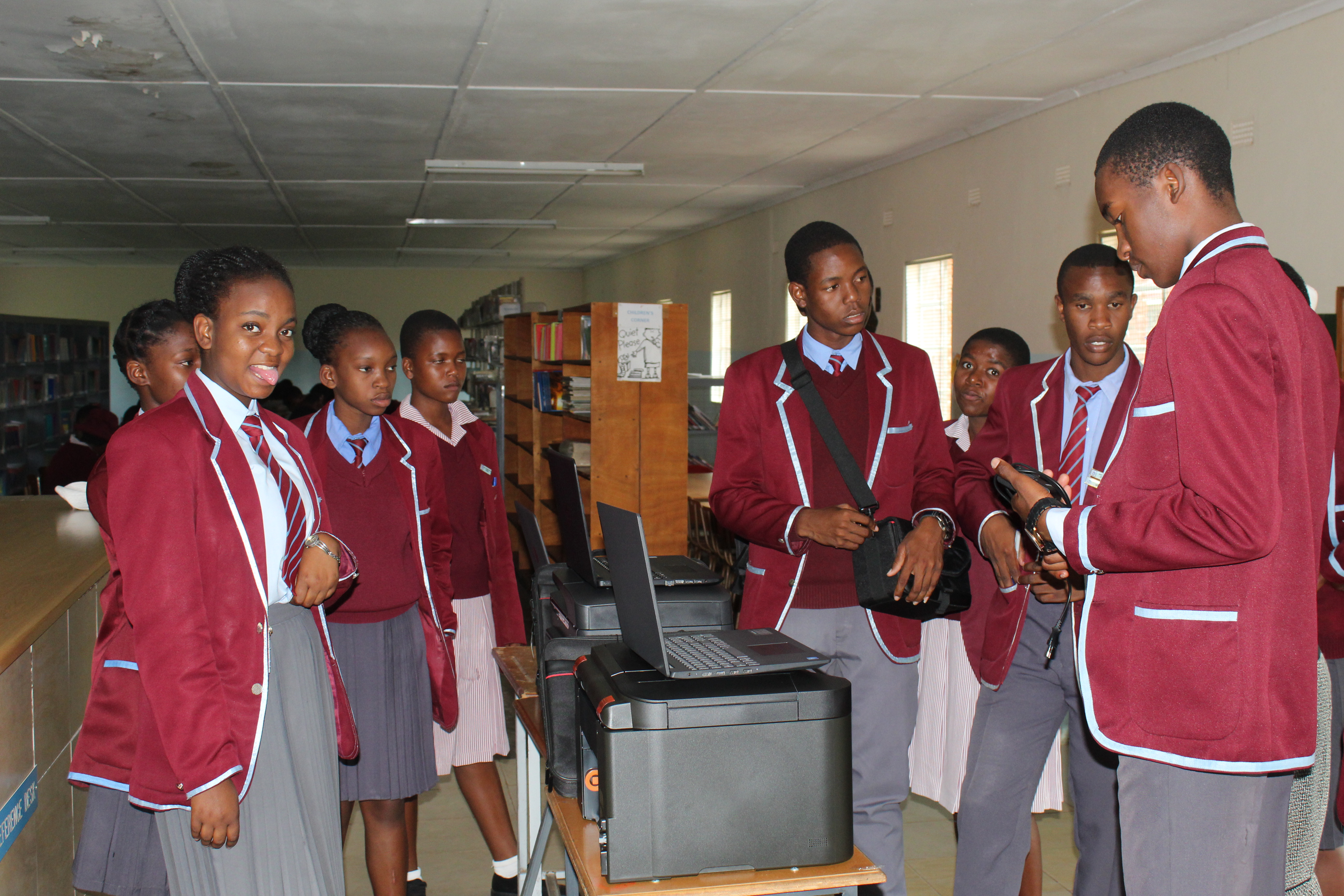
- Pupils at Inyathi High School

Location
- Inyathi; Zimbabwe
- Coordinates: 19°40′19.6″S 28°52′24″E

Information
- Former name: Inyathi Mission; Inyathi Secondary School
- Type: Private
- Established: 1859
- Founder: Mother Patrick Crosgrave
- Authority: United Congregational Church of Southern Africa

Inyathi High School (formerly Inyathi Mission and Inyathi Secondary School) is a boarding co-educational secondary school in Inyathi, Zimbabwe. It was established in 1859, making it the oldest formal educational institution in Zimbabwe. Along with Dombodema High School in Plumtree and Tennyson Hlabangane High School (formerly Hope Fountain Mission) in Bulawayo, Inyathi High School is privately owned by the United Congregational Church of Southern Africa (UCCSA) which is itself an offshoot of the London Missionary Society (LMS).

== History ==
Inyathi High School began as the Inyathi Mission School and was conceived as part of the Inyathi Mission, established by the LMS. The boys' school was established in 1921 and by the 1950s had grown into a Central Primary School (years 4, 5, and 6), an Industrial School (post-Standard Six training), and a secondary school. Girls were later admitted.

== Student life ==
The school has separate dormitories for boys (BD) with media rooms and girls (GD) with media rooms, dining l, a dispensary, classrooms and a tuckshop.

=== Education ===
Inyathi High School has an academic streaming system that groups students in the Sciences (A-stream) or Arts (B-stream) after the first two years of secondary schooling. Enrollment is estimated at 294 male students and 316 female students, and staff include 33 teachers, 2 boarding masters, an accounts clerk, and a bursar.

Results

O level

2021 - 94% passrate

2022 - 92% passrate

2023 - 99.2% passrate

A level

2021 - 100% passrate

2022 - 100% passrate

2023 - 100% passrate

=== Uniform ===
Between 1975 and 1978, the school uniform for boys were grey shirt, grey long trousers in the winter, grey short trousers in the summer, grey knee length socks, mauve jumpers, mauve blazer (badged), black shoes, and a scarf with the student's house colour. For girls, it was a lilac and white thin striped tunic, white ankle socks, mauve jumpers, mauve blazer (badged) and black shoes.

=== House system ===
Welfare management of students is by a rigid traditional four house system. The houses are named after the school's founders and assigned colours as follows:

- Moffat House: Blue (in honour of Dr Robert Moffat)
- Rees House: Green (in honour of Dr Bowen Rees)
- Thomas House: Red (in honour of Morgan Thomas Morgan)
- Sykes House: Yellow (in honour of William Sykes)

Accommodation arrangements in the dormitories and sitting arrangements in the dining hall are based strictly on the School House System. The school has a traditional prefect system, consisting of a head boy and head girl, each with a deputy. Each intake of students is followed by a randomised draft system into the respective houses, with siblings also falling prey to the random house allocation. Once drafted, each student remains with the house throughout their stay in the school. Each house is headed by a House Master from the academic staff, a Boys House Captain, and a Girls House Captain supported by a complement of boy and girl prefects (amaPoro) elected by each stream of the academic year in the first 2 years. All other senior prefects are selected by the academic staff with criteria for selection remaining a prerogative for the staff.

=== Athletics ===
Inyathi students compete with other Bubi District secondary schools, including Somvubu, Gloag, Majiji, Sijawuke, Dabenga, Mangubeni, and Siganda High Schools.

== Notable alumni ==
- Aleke Banda, former Minister of Finance in Malawi
- Micah Bhebe, former MP of ZANU–PF
- Ndumiso Gumede, former Highlanders FC chief executive
- Welshman Mabhena, former governor of Matabeleland North and Deputy Speaker of Parliament of Zimbabwe
- Mthuli Ncube, Finance Minister of Zimbabwe and Chief Economist and VP of the African Development Bank
