= Barend Barends =

Griqua chief and leader in southern Africa

- Born: c. 1777
- Died: 1839
- Occupation: Griqua chief
- Known for: Leadership of the Griqua people

Barend Barends (c. 1777 – 1839) was an early chief and leader of the Griqua people, a mixed-heritage Khoikhoi and European-descended community in southern Africa. He was influential in early Griqua political organisation and settlement in areas north of the Orange River.

== Early life ==
Barends was born around 1777 in the Cape Colony to a family of mixed Dutch and Khoikhoi descent. The Barends family, along with related Kok families, became prominent among groups later known as the Griqua.

== Leadership and settlement ==
In the late 18th and early 19th centuries, Barends emerged as one of the principal leaders among the migrating Basters, who were later called Griquas. These groups settled north of the Orange River under the influence of missionaries from the London Missionary Society, who encouraged sedentary settlement and an organized political structure.

Barends and contemporaries like Cornelius Kok and Adam Kok II participated in establishing settlements such as Klaarwater (later renamed Griquatown). He served as a captain (“kapteyn”) and was involved in joint military engagements with other Griqua leaders, including the 1823 Battle of Dithakong against forces threatening local communities.

== Later life and activities ==
After internal disagreements within the Griqua leadership, Barends relocated with his followers to Danielskuil, where he continued to lead his community and engage in pastoral and trading activities. His leadership contributed to the economic and social presence of Griqua people in the region.

Barends participated in broader regional conflicts of the era, including clashes with neighboring groups such as those led by Mzilikazi and Mmanthatisi though these engagements sometimes resulted in significant loss of life for his followers.

== Death and legacy ==
Barend Barends died in 1839. His role as one of the early leaders of the Griqua and his involvement in the formation of semi-autonomous Griqua communities on the colonial frontier have been recognized in historical and heritage research, though his legacy has often been less emphasized compared to later figures. In 2019, a Dutch journalist and researcher, Baart de Graaff wrote a book: Barend Barends,Die Vegte Generaal.

== See also ==
- Griqua people
- Adam Kok I
- Griqualand West
- Danielskuil
