= Griqua coinage =

First community coinage in South Africa

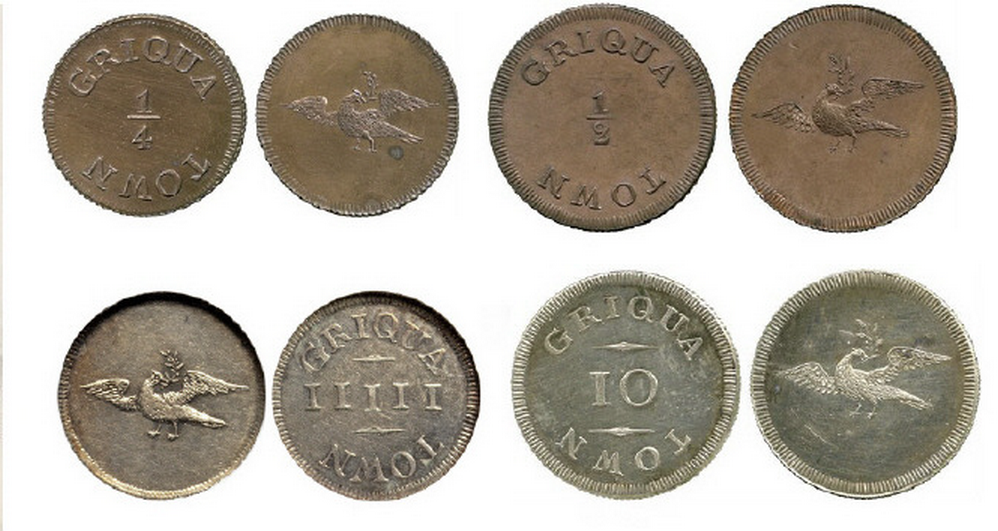
A Set of Griqua Tokens

The Griqua coinage was the first community coinage in South Africa and was introduced by the London Missionary Society.

== History of Griquatown ==
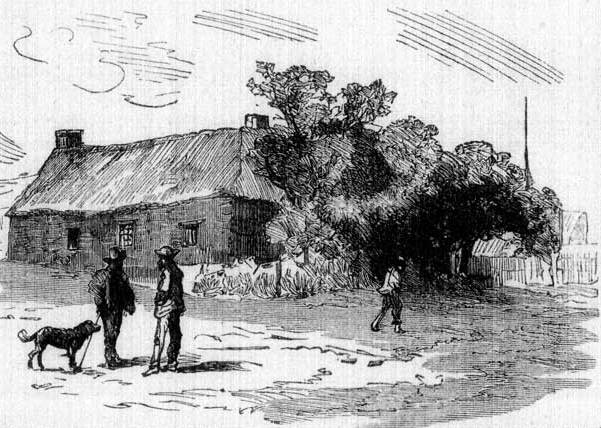

Griquatown is situated in the Northern Cape Province of South Africa. The town, formerly named Klaarwater, was established in April 1805 by missionary William Anderson of the London Missionary Society.

The Griqua, a racially and culturally mixed group, descended mainly from relationships between indigenous Khoikhoi, slave mothers and European male colonists. They referred to themselves as Bastaards amongst others.

A group of Bastaards, persuaded by the missionaries, settled at Klaarwater. During his visit to the town on 7 August 1813 John Campbell, a Director of the London Missionary Society thought the name Bastaards to be offensive. Campbell suggested they adopt the name of Griqua, a corruption of the name of their ChariGuriQua ancestors. During the same meeting the name Klaarwater was changed to Griqua Town.

== Politics and trade ==
Early Griquas consisting mostly of Bastaard families moved circa 1780 from the northern section of the Cape colony to settle along the Orange River. The powerful Kok and Barends families, both with a considerable following, formed the nuclei of the Griqua community. Although the Kok and Barends families probably controlled the affairs of the Griquas who settled with them, autonomous groups formed in the area. John Mellville, a missionary agent, studied these groups and noted that one of the groups increased from perhaps 3 to 4 Griqua families to over 40 between 1817 and 1823. Immigrants also settled in the area, establishing claims to fountains and pans while retaining links with the Griqua leadership. The Griquas were formidable traders who understood the concept of money, acting as middlemen between the colony and the northern nations. Formal trade took place at trade fairs arranged by the colonial government, while illegal trading with colonists was a common occurrence.

== Griquatown coinage ==
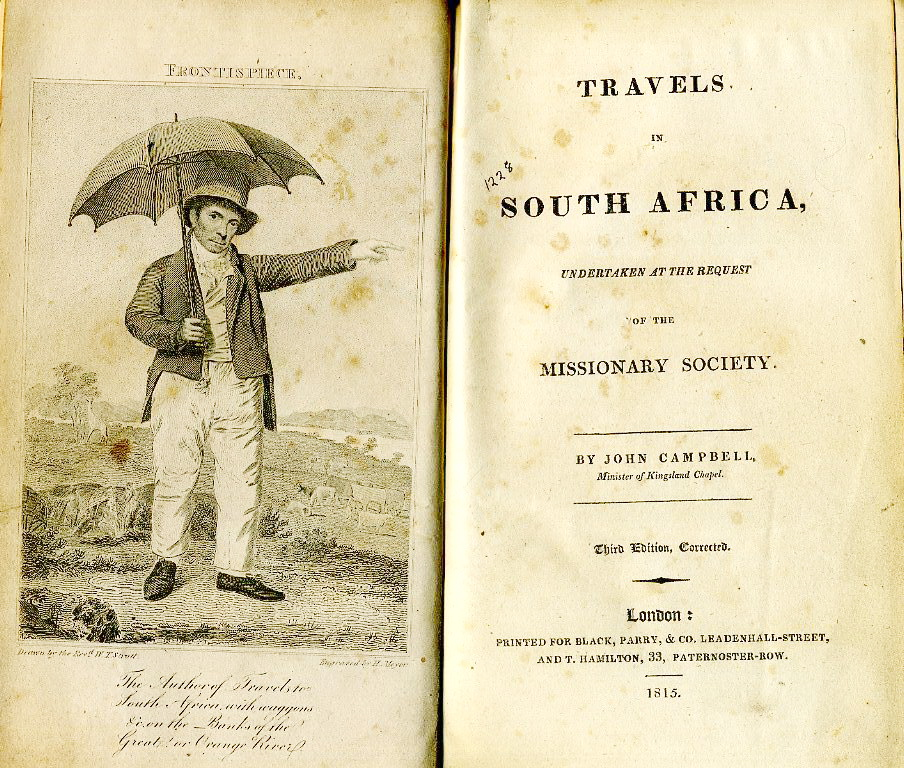
Travels in South Africa - John Campbell

Griqua coinage was introduced to Griquatown, South Africa circa 1817-1818 by the London Missionary Society. This was the first known issue of currency by Christian missionaries in South Africa. The coinage was referred to as tokens by the London Missionary Society and was minted in four denominations: 1/4 and 1/2 pence in copper, and ɪɪɪɪɪ(5) and 10 pence in silver. At the meeting of 7 August 1813 various other issues were discussed, including coinage, where

"It was likewise resolved that as they had no circulating medium amongst them by which they could purchase any small article, such as knives, scissors, etc. supposing a shop to be established amongst them - which they were anxious there should be - they should apply to the Missionary Society to get silver pieces of different value coined for them in England, which the Missionaries would take for their allowance from the Society, having the name of Griqua town marked on them. It is probable that if this were adopted in a short time they would circulate amongst all the nations about, and be a great convenience"

Circumstances at the Cape meant a dire shortage of circulated coinage in Griquatown and surrounds. Griqua trade was done mainly by barter, beads and rixdollars. This state of affairs must have prompted John Campbell to suggest a coinage for the Griqua District.

== Procurement of the Griquatown coinage ==
At the weekly meeting of the Directors of the London Missionary Society held on 15 January 1816, it was

"Resolved that the following Gentlemen be a Committee for considering of the best mode of furnishing a Silver Coinage for Griqua Town vizt Messrs Campbell, Muston, Steven & Bateman".

Two months later, at a meeting of the Directors held at their meeting rooms in the Old Jewry on 22 April 1816, it was

“Resolved that £100 be voted for a Silver Coinage as a circulating medium at Griqua Town & its Vicinity in So Africa - that this business be referred to Messrs Bateman and Muston”

On 10 May 1816 at the 22nd annual meeting (covering the 1815/1816 period) of the London Missionary Society, it was reported that

"An Auxiliary Mission Society has been established in Griquatown, the subscribers to which, having no money (for money is utterly unknown in that part of the world) have contributed property which is to be sold for the benefit of the Society. …To remedy the inconvenience sustained by the people, (who have now made considerable progress in civilization,) by their want of a circulating medium, the Directors are now procuring for them a coinage of silver tokens".

On 15 July 1816 it was

"Resolved that £200 in Coins [struck through] Tokens for use…as inflation…Griqua Town be forwarded to the Cape of Good Hope instead of £100 only - as before ordered".

The word Coins was replaced by Tokens. The inflation mentioned must have been based on the poor performance of the Rixdollar at the Cape, as the inflation in Britain was -8.4%.

At a meeting held on 21 October 1816 it was recorded that

"The following bills were ordered to be paid…William Westall…Silver Tokens £191.12"

The LMS Home Board Minutes record that at the meeting on 23 December 1816 it was

“Resolved that Mr Bateman be reimbursed by this Society for the loss sustained by him in consequence of his boy being robbed of a quantity of Silver, for Tokens, gratuitously procured by Mr Bateman for the use of the Settlement at GriquaTown”

In the following volume, it is recorded that at a meeting of the Directors on 27 January 1817 "The Sum of £49 [was] voted to Mr Bateman on the 23rd of Decmbr last in compensation for his loss, by the robbery of his boy of the Silver, for Tokens, ordered"

The donations register for the London Missionary Society for the period March 1816 to March 1817 reports "Cash in Exchange for Griqua Tokens, per Mr Langton - £3.8.0" (David Langton was the assistant secretary and treasurer of the London Missionary Society during this period). The tokens is thought to have been sold to a collector.

This narrative shows us the LMS directors were involved and approved of the procurement of the Griquatown Coinage.

== Arrival in South Africa ==
On 21 July 1817 a letter was sent by P.F. Hammes and R. Beck (LMS agents in Cape Town) to David Langton. An excerpt from the letter reads:

“Sir, We acknowledge the receipt of Yours dated 20 March last and have the honor to return for Answer, that we have received the two Cases, containing small Silver Specie and Copper pieces in good order, and we will act with the same according to the intention and wish of the Society”.

This is the only known record where the copper tokens are mentioned.

On his second visit to South Africa, John Campbell visited the Griqua mission station again and noted in his diary on 8 August 1820:

“The Landdrost (Andries Stockenstroom) thought it important to establish a regular communication between Griquatown and Graaff Reynet; also advised to apply to Government for sanction to the passing of the Griqua money in Graaff Reynet and Beaufort districts”.

(The two districts were part of the Cape Colony, while Griquatown was not)

A few days later, on 12 August, Campbell wrote:

“Conversed also on the coin. They said if it would pass in the colony the Griquas would readily take it. I promised to apply to the Governor to sanction its passing in the districts of Graaff-Reynet and Beaufort.”

== Issuance ==
Heinrich Helm, resident missionary of Griquatown, in a letter dated 21 June 1821 to the LMS representative in South Africa, Dr John Philip, wrote:

“The greatest part of the Griqua money is still our Society’s property which Br. Anderson when leaving us delivered to my care. As Mr Campbell thought that Br. Anderson had disposed the silver pieces at too cheap a rate, I asked him to let me know the real value of a piece of each sort which he promised to do, but I have as yet received no answer, and it is therefore still in my possession. I should be glad if you, Dear Sir, would have the goodness to inform me what I am to do with it”.

This is the only record of the coinage being issued. How the rate was determined is unclear. Whether the coinage ever circulated is also a subject of many a numismatic debate. No record of account using Griqua coinage has ever been found.

The Griqua Coinage is South Africa’s first autonomous coinage and forms an important part of South African numismatic history.

== Disposal of the tokens ==
The 40th report of the London Missionary Society, dated May 1834 and covering the previous 12 month period, reported that the Society received £98-6-4 from the Griquatown Auxiliary Society for coins sold. This amount constitutes just under half the amount of £200 that was initially approved for the production of the coins.

== Summary based on contemporary documents ==
1) The issue of the Griqua coinage was first discussed in August 1813 between the reverend John Campbell and the Griquas at Klaarwater (Griquatown). The initial idea was for the coinage to be issued to the missionaries as part of their allowance. The missionaries would then circulate the coinage to the Griquas in payment for small articles.

2) In January 1816 the Griqua coinage committee was established at the LMS headquarters in London.

3) In April 1816, the committee resolved that £100 be voted for the coinage that was to be used as a circulating medium at Griqua Town. On 15 July 1816 this decision was overturned and the amount increased to £200.

4) In October 1816 a LMS bill relating to the coinage was ordered to be paid for an amount of £191.12

5) The LMS donations-register for the period March 1816 to March 1817 reports that Griqua coinage to the value of 3 pounds and 8 shillings was bought from the society before the bulk was shipped off to South Africa.

6) In July 1817 it was confirmed by the LMS agent in Cape Town that both copper and silver coinage arrived in South Africa.

7) In August 1820, Reverend John Campbell notes that he would apply to the Cape Government to sanction the passing of the Griqua money in the Cape Colony. If so sanctioned, he notes that the Griquas would readily take the coins.

8) In June 1821 it was reported that the greatest part of the Griqua money was still in the possession of the mission station at Griquatown and that the smaller part of the silver coinage was disposed to the Griquas at the wrong rate.

9) Between May 1833 and April 1834, Griqua money to the value of almost £100 was sold by the Griquatown Auxiliary Society and the funds donated to the London Missionary Society.

== Denominations ==
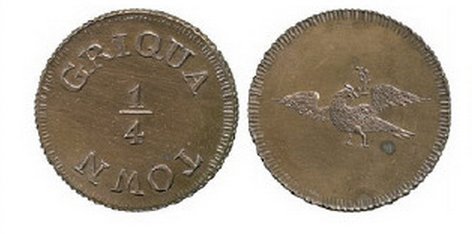

The copper Quarter "Pence" : Obverse: A dove flying with an olive branch in its beak. Reverse: ¼ with inscription GRIQUA (above) TOWN (below and upside down). Average diameter: 20.76 mm. Average thickness: 1.33 mm. Average mass: 3.63 gram. Edge: Reeded almost vertically.

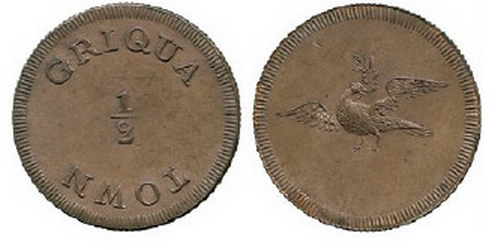

The copper Half "Pence": Obverse: A dove flying with an olive branch in its beak. Reverse: ½ with inscription GRIQUA (above) TOWN (below and upside down). Average diameter: 24.86 mm. Average thickness: 1.46 mm. Average mass: 6.20 gram. Edge: Reeded almost vertically.

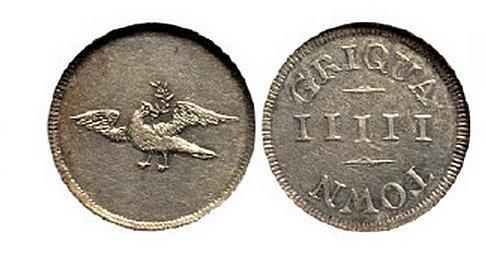

The silver Five "Pence" Obverse: A dove flying with an olive branch in its beak. Reverse: IIIII between two lines above and below with inscription GRIQUA (above) TOWN (below and upside down). Average diameter: 20.96 mm. Average thickness: 0.66 mm. Average mass: 2.37 gram. Edge: Reeded obliquely

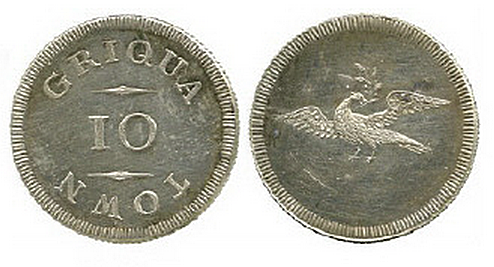

The silver Ten "Pence" Obverse: A dove flying with an olive branch in its beak. Reverse: 10 between two lines above and below with inscription GRIQUA (above) TOWN (below and upside down). Average diameter: 25.90 mm. Average thickness: 1.06 mm. Average mass: 4.90 gram. Edge: Reeded obliquely

A number of pattern pieces are reported by Hern, for example, a five and ten "pence" struck in copper and a half "pence" struck in lead as well as copper gilt.
