= Griekwastad =

Griekwastad !Gatsi//amma (Khoekhoe)
- Griekwastad
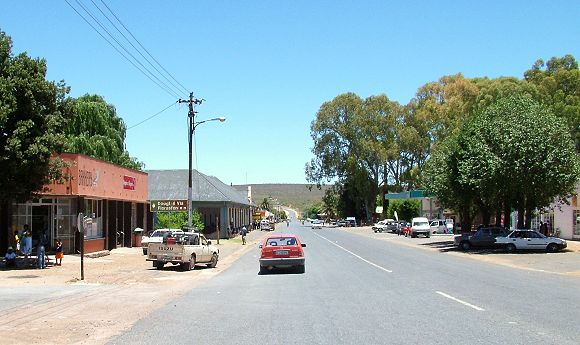
- Road in Griekwastad

- Location within Northern Cape Location within South Africa
- Coordinates: 28°51′S 23°15′E
- Country: South Africa
- Province: Northern Cape
- District: Pixley ka Seme
- Municipality: Siyancuma
- Established: 1812

Area
  - Total: 77.74 km^{2} (30.02 sq mi)

Population (2011)
  - Total: 6,428
  - Density: 82.69/km^{2} (214.2/sq mi)

Racial makeup (2011)
  - Black African: 33.3%
  - Coloured: 60.2%
  - Indian/Asian: 0.5%
  - White: 3.8%
  - Other: 2.2%

First languages (2011)
  - Afrikaans: 95.4%
  - Tswana: 2.3%
  - Other: 2.4%
- Time zone: UTC+2 (SAST)
- Postal code (street): 8365
- PO box: 8365
- Area code: 053

Griekwastad is a country town in South Africa. It is sometimes still called Griquatown (the meaning of the town's name in Afrikaans), a name which is now considered historical. On maps from the 1840s is the town also called "Karrikamma", or called ’Gatee t’Kamma according to the book The native races of South Africa.

The town is on the N8 road in the Northern Cape Province of South Africa 168 kilometres (104 mi) by road west from the city of Kimberley. It was the first town to be established in the country north of the Orange River.

== History ==
In 1801 William Anderson and Cornelius Kramer, of the London Missionary Society, established a station among the Griqua at Leeuwenkuil. The site proved too arid for cultivation. In about 1805 they moved the station to another spring further up the valley and called it Klaarwater. Their second choice was little better than their first, and for many years a lack of water prevented any further development. The name of the settlement was changed later to Griquatown or Griekwastad in Afrikaans. They lived among a mixed nomadic community of the Chaguriqua tribe and "bastaards" (people of mixed origin) from Piketberg. Their two leaders Andries Waterboer and Adam Kok II later had a dispute and Kok left for Philippolis.

From 1813 to 17 July 1871, the town and its surrounding area functioned as Waterboer's Land. Waterboer himself lived in a "palace", which in reality was a house with six rooms. A monument for Waterboer was later erected near the town's hospital.

Robert Moffat and his wife Mary Moffat, on their way to the town of Kuruman, were residing in Griquatown when their daughter, also Mary (later Mrs. David Livingstone), was born in 1821. There is now a museum that is dedicated to her rather than the founder of the town, William Anderson.

That Griekwastad was later the capital of British Colony Griqualand West from 1873 to 1880, with its own flag and currency, before it was annexed into the Cape Colony. During the Apartheid era from 1969 till 2001, it was the garrison of the 4 Armoured Regiment, an SADF Tank Battalion equipped with Eland Mk7 Tanks.

Nowadays, the town is best known for the semi-precious stones found there, particularly tiger's eye and jasper. Sheep farming occurs with dorpers, a South African breed, which can now be found in places such as Australia.

== Crime ==
On 6 April 2012 (Good Friday), Griekwastad farmer Deon Steenkamp (44), his wife Christelle (43) and their daughter Marthella (14) were killed. Later, Marthella was also found to have been raped during the last 24 hours of her life. Eventually the family's sole survivor, fifteen-year-old Don Steenkamp, who stood to gain a sizable inheritance, was suspected and accused of murdering his father. In 2014, he was found guilty of the murders, of raping his sister and of lying to the police and sentenced to twenty years imprisonment.

== See also ==
- Griqua Coinage
