= William Roby =

English clergyman (1766–1830)

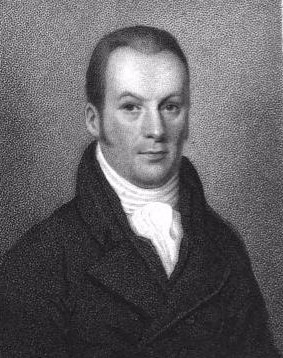
- William Roby, 1818 engraving
- Born: 23 March 1766; Haigh, Greater Manchester, England
- Died: 11 January 1830 (aged 63)
- Education: Wigan grammar school
- Spouse: Sarah Roby
- Father: Nehemiah Roby
- Relatives: John Roby (half-brother)

William Roby (1766–1830) was an English Congregational minister.

== Life ==
Born at Haigh, near Wigan, Lancashire on 23 March 1766, he was the half-brother of the poet John Roby; his parents belonged to the Church of England. He was educated at Wigan grammar school, where his father Nehemiah Roby was master, and he himself became classical master at the grammar school of Bretherton, Lancashire.

Roby owed a change of religious belief to the preaching of John Johnson. Beginning to preach in villages round Bretherton, Roby resigned his teaching position and entered Trevecca College; but only stayed six weeks. After preaching at Worcester, Reading and Ashby-de-la-Zouch, he became Johnson's assistant at St. Paul's Chapel, Wigan. When Johnson moved on, in 1789, he became sole pastor, ordained in London on 20 September 1789.

In 1795 Roby took on the Congregational church in Cannon Street, Manchester. He began with an attendance of 150, which he raised substantially. Benjamin Nightingale's Lancashire Non-Conformity documents his work in founding new churches.

On 27 June 1797 Roby went to Scotland on a mission with James Alexander Haldane. On 3 December 1807 a new chapel was opened for him in Grosvenor Street, Manchester, where he ministered for the rest of his life. He trained some 15 students for the ministry, financed by his friend Robert Spear; Lancashire Independent College then built on these efforts. In 1815 he met Robert Moffat and became his mentor and in time recommended him to the London Missionary Society. Robert and Mary Moffat would create a family of missionaries in southern Africa.

Roby died on 11 January 1830, and was buried in his chapel-yard. His widow, Sarah Roby, died in 1835. The Roby schools at Manchester were erected in 1844 by way of memorial of him. William Gordon Robinson wrote his biography as William Roby (1766–1830) and the Revival of Independency in the North (1954). He is also commemorated by the modern name of Grosvenor Street which is Roby Street; the renaming was in 1831.

== Works ==
Roby published sermons (from 1798) and pamphlets, including:

- The Tendency of Socinianism, Wigan, 1791.
- A Defence of Calvinism, 1810.
- Lectures on … Revealed Religion, 1818
- Anti-Swedenborgianism, Manchester, 1819; letters to John Clowes.
- Protestantism, Manchester, 1821–2, two parts.
- Missionary Portraits, Manchester, 1826.
- A selection of hymns (2nd edit., Wigan, 1799).

== Notes ==
Attribution

This article incorporates text from a publication now in the public domain: Lee, Sidney, ed. (1897). "Roby, William". Dictionary of National Biography. Vol. 49. London: Smith, Elder & Co.
