= Mary Moffat =

British missionary (1795-1871)

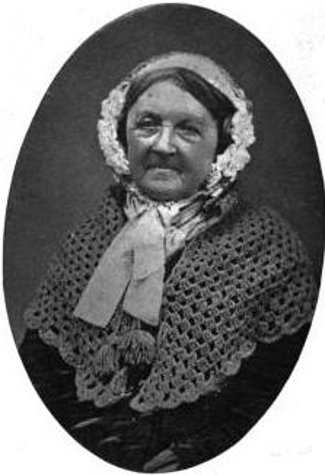
- Born: 1795; Dukinfield, Greater Manchester, England
- Died: January 9, 1871 (aged 75–76); Brixton, London
- Occupation: missionary
- Employer: London Missionary Society
- Known for: iconic woman missionary
- Spouse: Robert Moffat (m. 1819)
- Children: 10
- Relatives: Mary Moffat (daughter); David Livingstone (son-in-law)

Mary Moffat born Mary Smith (1795 – 9 January 1871) was a British missionary who became a role model for women involved in missionary work. She was the wife of Robert Moffat, the mother of Mary Moffat Livingstone and David Livingstone was her son-in-law. She was seen by Victorian Britain as an ideal missionary wife and role model for Tswana women, but it is unproven whether Africans saw her in this role.

== Life ==
Moffat was born in Dukinfield in 1795. She came from a Christian family and she met Robert Moffat whilst he was a prospective missionary working as a gardener for her father. Robert Moffat was being trained by William Roby. She and Robert agreed that she should join him as a missionary, but she had a strong family relationship. The engagement was put off at one point after she heard of "sexual misbehaviour" amongst missionaries in Africa.

Against the advice of the London Missionary Society Robert Moffat set out for southern Africa in 1816. The LMS advised that missionaries should be male and married. Mary went out to join him in 1819 and they were married on 27 December at St Georges Church (St. George's Cathedral, Cape Town was not started until 1830).

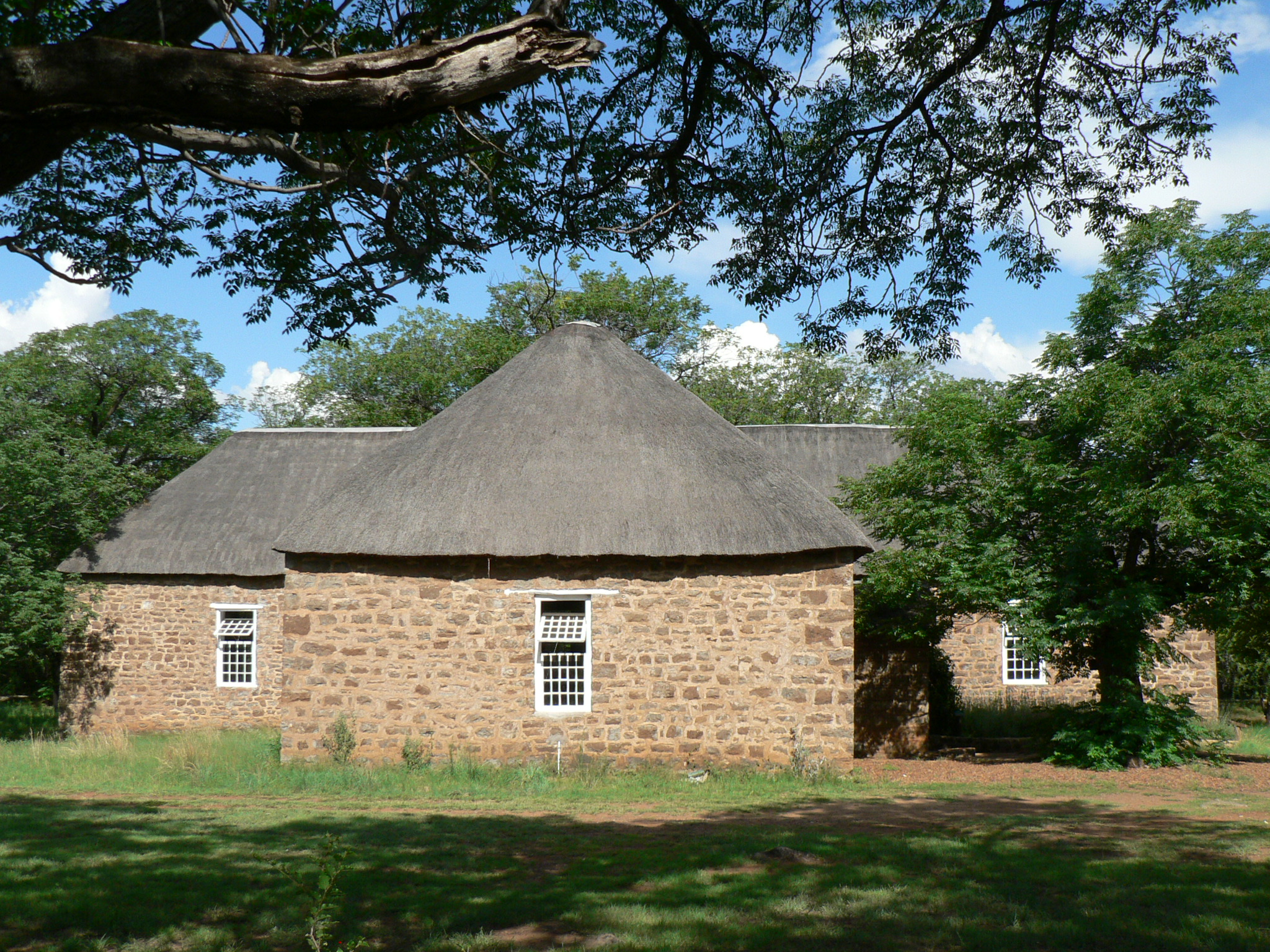
Church and Moffat Mission at Kuruman

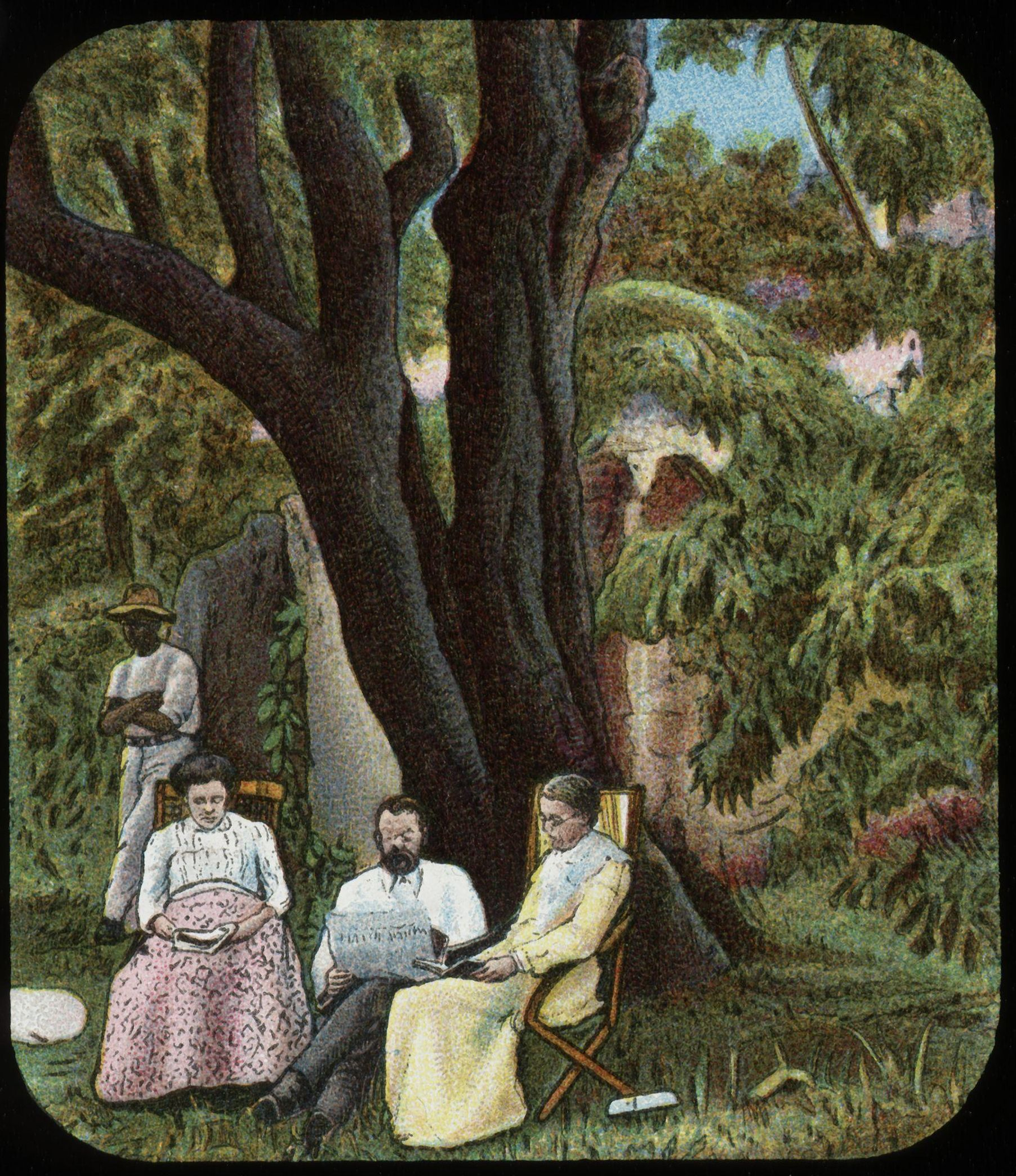
Mary Moffat and her husband sitting under an almond tree at Kuruman with their eldest daughter Mary.

Robert and Mary's first child, Mary, was born in a grass hut in Griquatown in 1821. They were outside Britain's Cape Colony as they created the mission to the Tswana people. Robert, Mary and little Mary moved to Kuruman in 1824 where the mission became known as the Moffat Mission. They built a church, created a water supply and raised a family. However, progress was slow and five years later they had not made a single convert. The children were sent back to England for many years in order that they could be educated.

Mary had lost an infant son who died at only five days old in 1825. Soon after she was informed by one of the missionary servants that an infant native baby, whose mother had just died, was customarily buried under some rocks at a nearby hillside. Alarmed, Mary demanded, "show me the place". She was led to a hillside, carefully removed the rocks, and found the five-week-old infant crying. Grief-stricken she embraced the infant and brought it home. Her husband Robert, wondering why his wife had not attended services that day, came home to find that Mary had steadfastly adopted the child. Asking what they would name the child, Robert suggested Sarah. Mary added, "and Roby", after the woman who had informed Mary of the infant's plight. The child was subsequently christened, Sarah Roby.

She and Robert were credited with creating a family of "Moffats" who carried forward the mission work.

In 1859 her son John Smith Moffat began working at the mission at Inyathi where he would stay for six years. In 1860 she received Richard Price back to the mission. He and his wife had survived what they believed was a mass poisoning at their mission. His wife died and the following year Moffat's daughter Elizabeth agreed to become Price's new wife. Her daughter Ann was already married to the French missionary Jean Frédoux. In 1862 her eldest daughter Mary, who was married to David Livingstone, died of fever and Mrs. Moffat blamed Livingstone for her death.

== Death and legacy ==
Moffat and her husband returned to Britain in 1870. They lived in Brixton with Henry Vavasseur. She died in Brixton in 1871. There is a Mary Moffat Museum in Griquatown. It is named for her daughter who was born in Griquatown, but it also celebrates the mission that this Mary and her husband created in 1803.

Moffat was held by the British as the ideal woman Protestant evangelist. She was thought to have spent her time teaching needlework and as a model for Tswana girls to follow. However, there is little evidence that she was seen in Africa in this way and their missions in Africa created few converts. She did, however, keep the mission running and she brought up her children to donate their time to good works. Her correspondence with people in Britain helped to foster support for the work and the letters are now an important record of life in the interior of Africa.

== Sources ==
- Clinton, Iris (1958). Friend of the chiefs: the story of Robert Moffat. London: Lutterworth Press.
