= John Roby =

English banker, poet & writer (1793–1850)

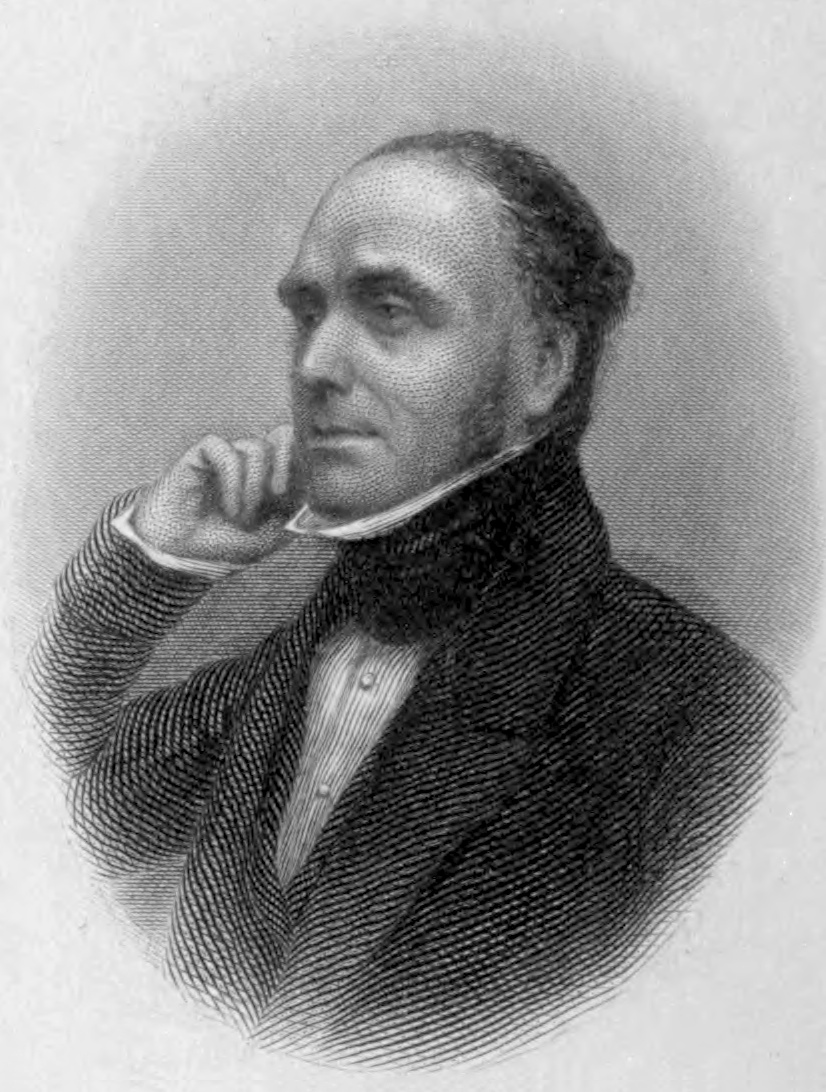
- John Roby, from the 1872 edition of The Traditions of Lancashire
- Born: 5 January 1793; Haigh, Greater Manchester, England
- Died: 18 June 1850 (aged 57); Irish Sea
- Occupations: Banker, poet, writer
- Relatives: William Roby (half-brother)

John Roby (5 January 1793 – 18 June 1850) was an English banker, poet, and writer.

== Life ==
Roby was born in Wigan, England, in 1793, the son of Mary Aspull and a schoolmaster named Nehemiah Roby. He began his career as a banker in Rochdale, Lancashire. In his work Lancashire Sketches, Edwin Waugh recalled that, while Roby was working for the firm of Fenton and Roby in Rochdale, Waugh worked as an apprentice at the bookshop next door.

For the clergy of the district, and for a certain class of politicians, this shop was the chief rendezvous of the place. Roby used to slip in at evening, to have a chat with my employer [Thomas Holden], and a knot of congenial spirits who met him there. In the days when my head was yet but a little way higher than the counter, I remember how I used to listen to his versatile conversations.

Roby died in a shipwreck in June 1850. Despite clear weather, the S. S. Orion struck rocky bottom at Portpatrick en route from Liverpool to Glasgow. Folklorist Simon Young has called Roby "the most important figure in the first phase of Lancashire folklore writing", but also "the despised father of Lancashire folklore".

== Works ==
Roby wrote an influential, two-volume study on English folklore, The Traditions of Lancashire, in 1829. The book was a hit with the British upper classes, and it was reprinted within a year. Roby published a second series in 1831. Francis Palgrave thanked Roby for the work and asked him to write more. Nevertheless, readers did not believe that a banker could have written the books, and speculation named several others as the real author, including Crofton Croker who included, though, one plagiarised story in the collection. The works were condensed into three volumes and republished in 1841 for the general public as Popular Traditions of Lancashire. Roby wrote in the introduction that he intended to continue with volumes on other popular English traditions, but he never followed up on the promise. Different versions of The Traditions of Lancashire were reprinted in 1906, 1911, 1928, and 1930. He taught a four-session course on "Tradition, as connected with, and illustrating history, antiquities, and Romance" in his hometown of Rochdale.

In some respects, Roby's efforts presaged later work in folkloristics. He used the term "oral tradition" long before it came into common academic usage. He noticed and wrote about similarities between folk beliefs in different regions in different eras. Roby denied any authority as a folklorist (antiquarian) and instead called himself simply a collector of oral traditions:

In the northern counties, and more particularly in Lancashire ... it may readily be imagined that a number of interesting legends, anecdotes, and scraps of family history, are floating about, hitherto preserved chiefly in the shape of oral tradition. The antiquary, in most instances, rejects the information that does not present itself in the form of an authentic and well-attested fact; and legendary lore, in particular, he throws aside, as worthless and unprofitable. The author of the 'Traditions of Lancashire,' in leaving the dry and heraldic pedigree which unfortunately constitute the great bulk of those works that bear the name of county histories, enters on the more entertaining, though sometimes apocryphal narratives, which exemplify and embellish the records of our forefathers. A native of Lancashire, and residing there during the greater part of his life, he has been enabled to collect a mass of local traditions, now fast-dying from the memories of the inhabitants. It is his object to perpetuate these interesting relics of the past, and to present them in a form that may be generally acceptable, divested of the dust and dross in which the originals are but too often disfigured, so as to appear worthless and uninviting.

Nevertheless, as folklore studies advanced, his work came to be viewed as untrustworthy. Roby seems to have been ignorant of the works of English antiquaries who were developing the field at the time. Instead, he sided with the Romanticists and saw folklore as faulty and lowly, the blemished utterances of peasants, which needed a more advanced hand to render in its full beauty. His technique was to collect folk stories and rewrite them into coherent tales in a more refined style. He used a copy of the Encyclopedia of Antiquities by Thomas Dudley Fosbroke (1825) to check details of "costume and furnishings". For example, when he was trying to write the tale of a boggart rumoured to haunt the area of Clegg Hall northeast of Rochdale, he found the tales of the locals too mutually irreconcilable to weave into a coherent whole. In the end, Roby took the only kernel of continuity—a jealous uncle who threw his two nephews into a moat to steal their inheritance in the 13th or 14th century and the subsequent haunting of the hall—and spun it into a 50-page work of fancy. Still, Roby's works were celebrated in their time, and later folklorists referred to them until the 1870s when new works on Lancashire legends superseded them. Folklorist William E. A. Axon wrote in 1899 of the caution with which Roby's works had come to be viewed: "The late Mr. John Roby, whose 'Traditions of Lancashire' first appeared in 1829, was a diligent collector of local legends, but his object was purely literary, and accordingly his book must be used cautiously, though it certainly contains important data." Katharine Briggs noted, instead: "the narratives [of Roby] have been so much adorned that it is almost impossible to find out what happened".

After his death, Roby's wife published his unfinished works and biography as The Legendary and Poetical Remains of John Roby, despite the fact that his life was "so private it afforded but few materials".

== Cited sources ==
- Dorson, Richard M. (1999 [1968]). The British Folklorists: A History, History of British Folklore Vol. I. London: Routledge. ISBN 0-415-20476-3.
- Roby, E. R. (1854). The Legendary and Poetical Remains of John Roby, Author of "Traditions of Lancashire." With a Sketch of His Literary Life and Career. London: Longman, Brown, Green, and Longmans.
