= Inyathi =

Village in Zimbabwe

- Village
- Etymology: Buffalo (Xhosa)
- Inyathi in Zimbabwe
- Coordinates: 19°40′4.14″S 28°51′39.67″E
- Founder: King Mzilikazi; Rev. Robert Moffat; William Sykes
- Elevation: 1,325 m (4,347 ft)

Population
  - Total: 8,402
- Time zone: UTC+2 (Africa/Harare)

Inyathi (also known as Enyathi, Inyati, UMzinyathi, and Emhlangeni) is a village located in the Bubi District of Matabeleland North, Zimbabwe that grew from colonization by missionaries in the late 19th century. The Mission itself sits upon around 2,729 hectares (6,740 acres) of land. Inyathi is about 100 kilometres (62 mi) from Bulawayo and has a number of gold mines that have inspired both corporate (including Rio Tinto and Anglo American) and illegal mining.

== Etymology ==
Inyathi is the Xhosa word for buffalo; the town was named for the nearby Buffalo River.

== History ==
=== Pre-colonization ===
Due to colonization, information about pre-colonial Inyathi has largely been lost.

=== Colonialism ===
Reverend Robert Moffat of the London Missionary Society (LMS) traveled from Kuruman with a string of ox-drawn carts to visit King Mzilikazi in 1854, 1857, and 1859 with a proposition to build a Mission on his lands. King Mzilikazi agreed on the terms that they would do so for "non-religious reasons", as the Northern Ndebele people were very devoted to their own religious practice. He hoped that by allowing them to settle, he could use them as agents for trade with white traders from South Africa. The Mission was established in 1859 by Moffat and William Sykes. This became the oldest Mission and first permanent white settlement in Zimbabwe, and the first Mission to offer education to the locals. While it offered adult and evening classes, no university was established. The initial Mission consisted only of a red-brick church built by Moffat, who left Inyathi once the necessary buildings were built.

The LMS viewed Inyathi as a failure for many years due to the inability of missionaries to convert its people to Christianity. During the last decade of the 19th century, however, the colonizers began seizing power, first by attempting to smother the importance of the iziNduna, then by creating their own police force. According to Cullen Reed, a missionary from another settlement, young girls were "burning sores in their skin to imitate contagious diseases to avoid the attentions of white men." The Europeans also punished Ndebele men in deliberately cruel ways, such as dragging them along behind horses. Missionaries began stealing cattle from farms, at one point having 362,000 cattle, and killing "the sacred black cattle that embodied the spirits of the king's ancestors".

The colonizers then seized land from the Ndebele, allowing them to stay in their homes so long as they paid rent or worked the land. They later decided there were too many Black residents in Inyathi and forced them to the outskirts of the village into an area called The Reserves or, later, the Communal Lands. Despite having so much of the land, only "150 of the 1070 European farms were actually worked [sic]." In 1989, 6,000 people and 1,000 cattle were living on the 11 square miles (28 km^{2}) of the Communal Lands.

== Education ==
The Mission School for boys was established in 1921 and by the 1950s had grown into a Central Primary School (years 4, 5, and 6), an Industrial School (post-Standard Six training), and a secondary school. Girls were later admitted. The school is now known as Inyathi High School and is privately owned by the United Congregational Church of Southern Africa, which developed from the LMS.

== Graveyard ==
Inyathi's cemetery holds the graves of missionaries' children, white farmers, and prominent church members, having had its first burial in 1860. Among those buried there are Mzingaye Dube, who headed the secondary school, Ndumiso Gumede, Highlanders F.C. executive, and politician Micah Bhebhe.
