= Kuruman Moffat Mission =

Coordinates: 27°25′18″S 23°25′42″E

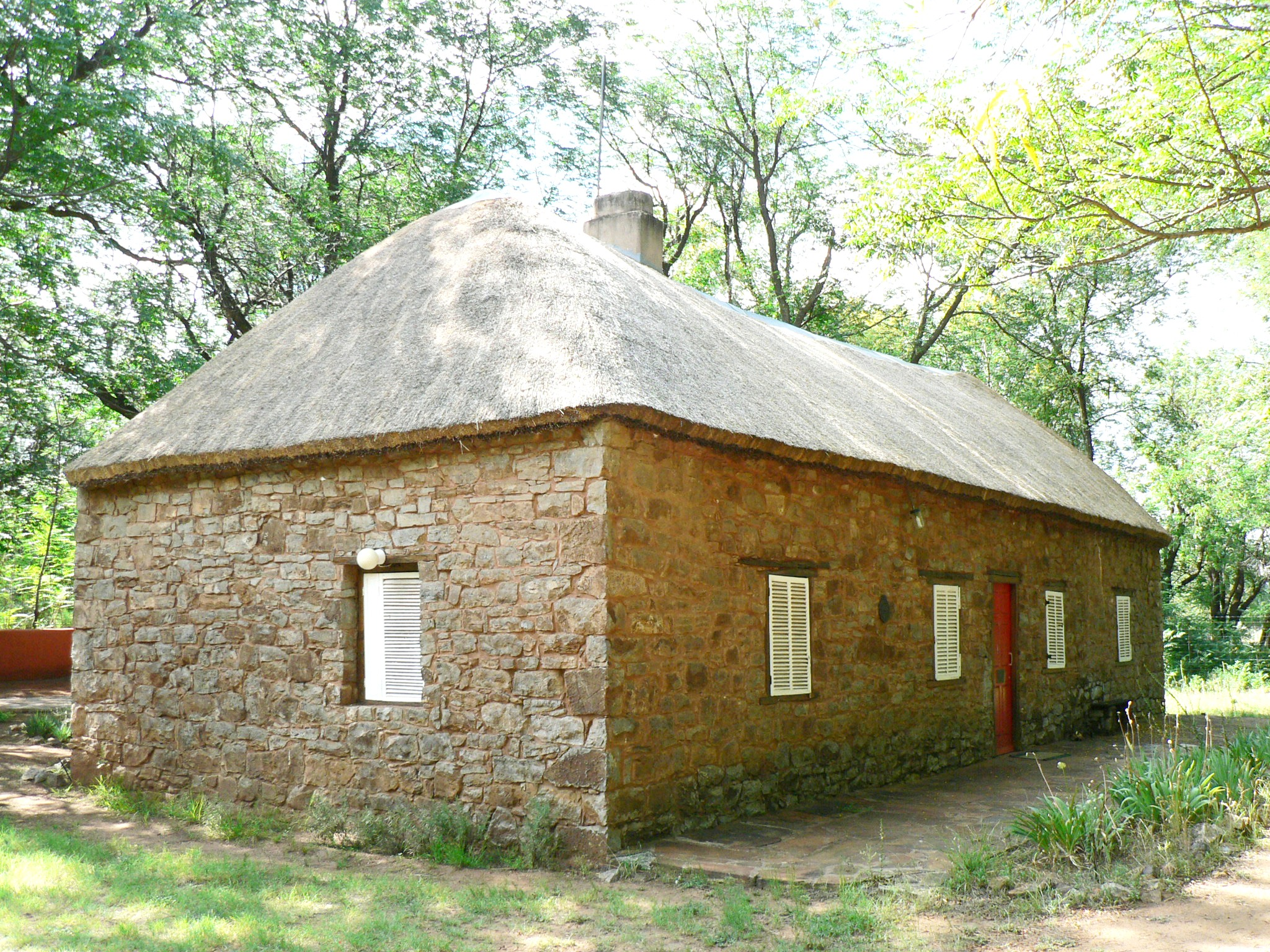
Church and Moffat Mission at Kuruman

The Kuruman Moffat Mission at Seodin outside Kuruman, South Africa, traces its establishment, by the London Missionary Society, to 1816, although the first settlement was not where the mission now stands but at ‘New Lattakoo’. The move to the present site at Seodin was made in 1824. Missionaries William Edwards and Robert Hamilton founded the mission but it was Robert Moffat, who joined them in 1820, whose name became synonymous with the Kuruman Mission. He with his wife Mary Moffat remained there until 1870. Having learnt Setswana, Moffat produced a complete translation of the Bible by 1857, in which year it was printed on the mission press at Kuruman - the first time that the Bible had been printed in its entirety anywhere in Africa, and the first time in a previously unwritten African language.

== See also ==
- Mary Moffat
- Robert Moffat
- Alan Butler
