= Robert Moffat (missionary) =

Scottish missionary (1795–1883)

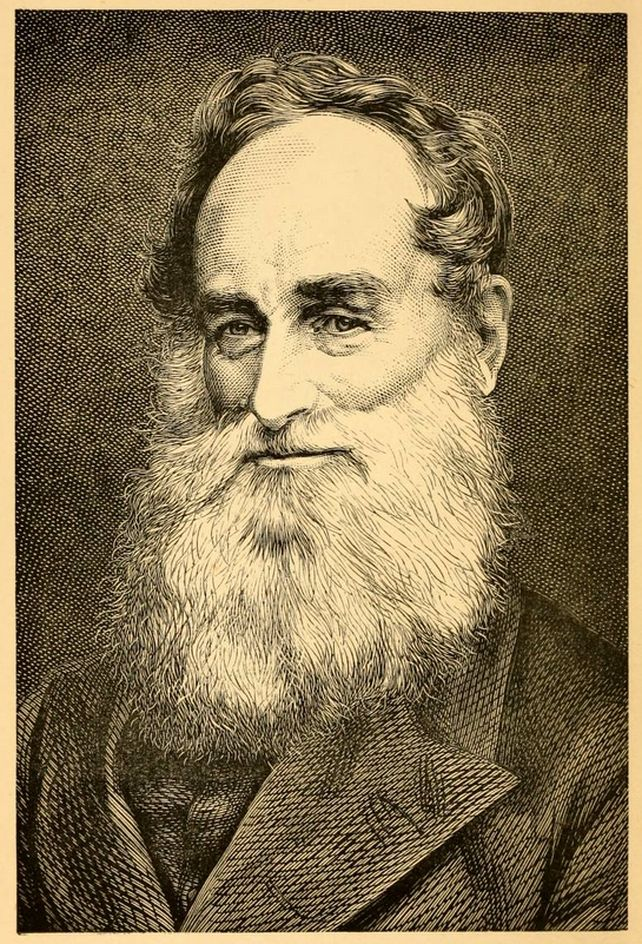
- Missionary to Africa

Personal life
- Born: 21 December 1795 Ormiston, East Lothian, Scotland
- Died: 9 August 1883 (aged 87) Leigh, Kent, England
- Spouse: Mary Moffat (m. 1819; died 1871)
- Children: 10
- Occupation: Missionary in Africa, author, teacher
- Relatives: Mary Moffat (daughter); David Livingstone (son-in-law)
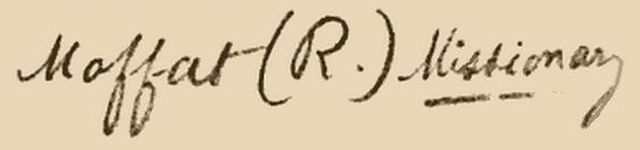
- Signature

Religious life
- Religion: Methodist Episcopal Church

Robert Moffat (21 December 1795 – 9 August 1883) was a Scottish Congregationalist missionary to Africa from 1817 to 1870.

Moffat began his missionary career in South Africa at the age of twenty-one. Moffat was married to Mary Moffat. Their daughter was Mary Moffat Livingstone and their son-in-law was David Livingstone, an explorer and missionary who often worked with Moffat and his missionary efforts at various stations in southern Africa. While doing missionary work at the mission at Kuruman, Moffat was the first to translate and have the Bible printed into the Sechuana language. (Note: "Sechuana, which is the spelling Moffat uses throughout his works, is also spelled "Setwasana" or Twasana", generally spoken by the native peoples in South Africa, Namibia and Botswana.) While in Africa, Moffat devoted much of his time to preaching the gospel and discussing the Bible, and also taught many of the natives how to read and write. Moffat's missionary career in Africa spanned a total of fifty-four years.

== Family and early life ==
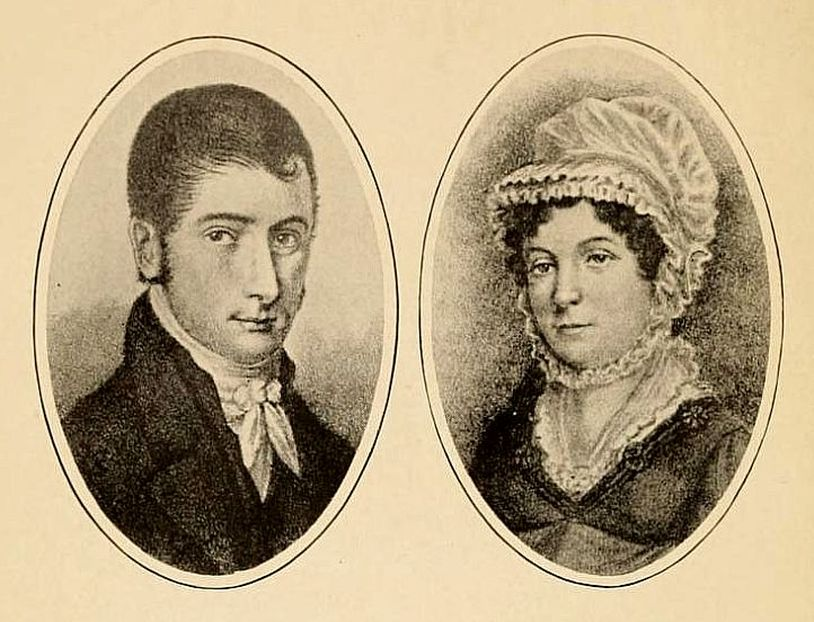
Robert and Mary Moffat

Moffat was born of humble parentage in Ormiston, in Scotland. Robert received an intermittent education. In 1797 his father received an appointment in the Custom House at Portsoy. In 1806 Moffat's home was at Carronshore, on the Firth of Forth. At this time the family consisted of five sons and two daughters. Moffat's first teacher was William Mitchell, also known as "Wully Mitchell," who was the parish schoolmaster. He was considered a stern teacher and would rap Robert on the knuckles if he slacked off in his schooling. Moffat's first instruction book was The Shorter Catechism, which contained the alphabet in its title page. At an early age Moffat left school to work on a coasting vessel. He gave up his job at sea and returned to school, and at the age of eleven he took up residence with his older brother Alexander and attended six more months of school.

Moffat began to appreciate a more liberal education, and managed his work schedule as to allow him to attend an evening class, where he began to study Latin, and also acquired a rudimentary knowledge of applied geometry. During this apprenticeship he learned to use blacksmith's tools, which would later prove to be of value to him. After work he took up practicing and became skilled on the violin, which he would later become known for during his years in Africa.

At the age of sixteen, Moffat found employment in the gardens of the Earl of Moray at Donibristle. In 1813, he moved to Manchester, England and worked under John Smith, a merchant. Here he met Mary Smith, who would later become his wife. In 1814, whilst employed at West Hall, High Legh in Cheshire he experienced difficulties with his employer due to his Methodist sympathies. For a short period, after having applied successfully to the London Missionary Society (LMS) (Note: The London Missionary Society was the first British society to enter the South African field, offering people like Moffat the chance to become an overseas missionary.) he took an interim post as a farmer, at Plantation Farm in Dukinfield (where he first met Mary his future wife). The job had been found for him by William Roby, who took Moffat under his wing for a year. Besides his early training as a gardener and farmer, and later as a writer, Moffat developed skills in building, carpentry, printing and as a blacksmith. Moffat also attended the religious services of Reverend Robert Caldwell.

Moffat's mother read to him stories of the courage of the Moravian and other early missionaries. This is when he received his first aspirations towards a missionary career. The thought and desire of actually going abroad as a missionary, however, did not occur until after his conversion, which occurred when he reached twenty years of age. In 1813 he secured a post in the gardens of Charles Legh, at High Legh in Cheshire, and after bidding goodbye to his mother, who made him promise to read a chapter of the Bible morning and evening.

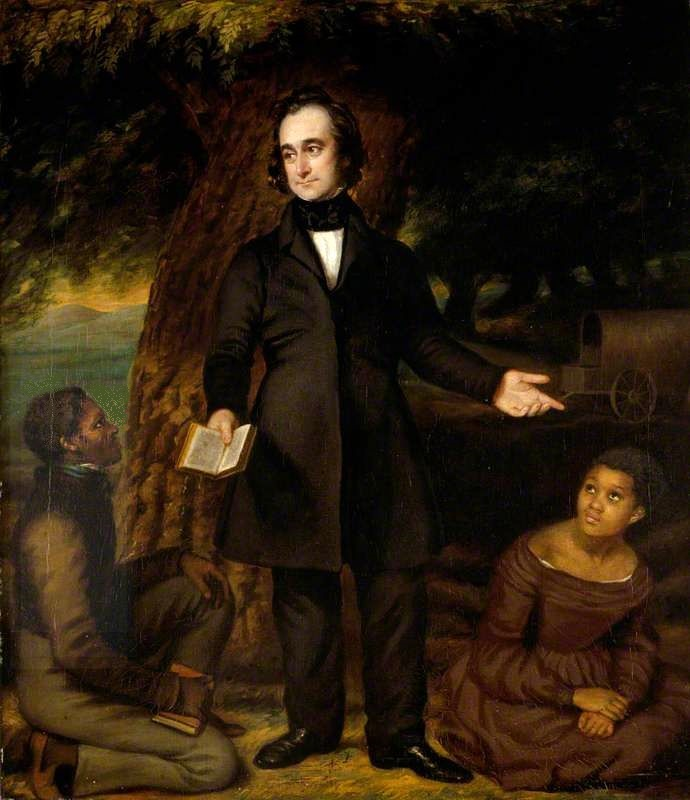
Robert Moffat (1795 - 1883), John Mokoteri and Sarah Roby

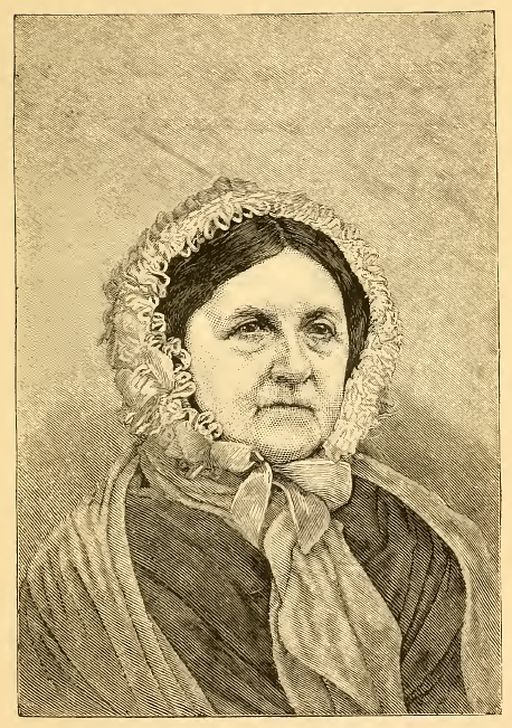
Mary Moffat (Smith)

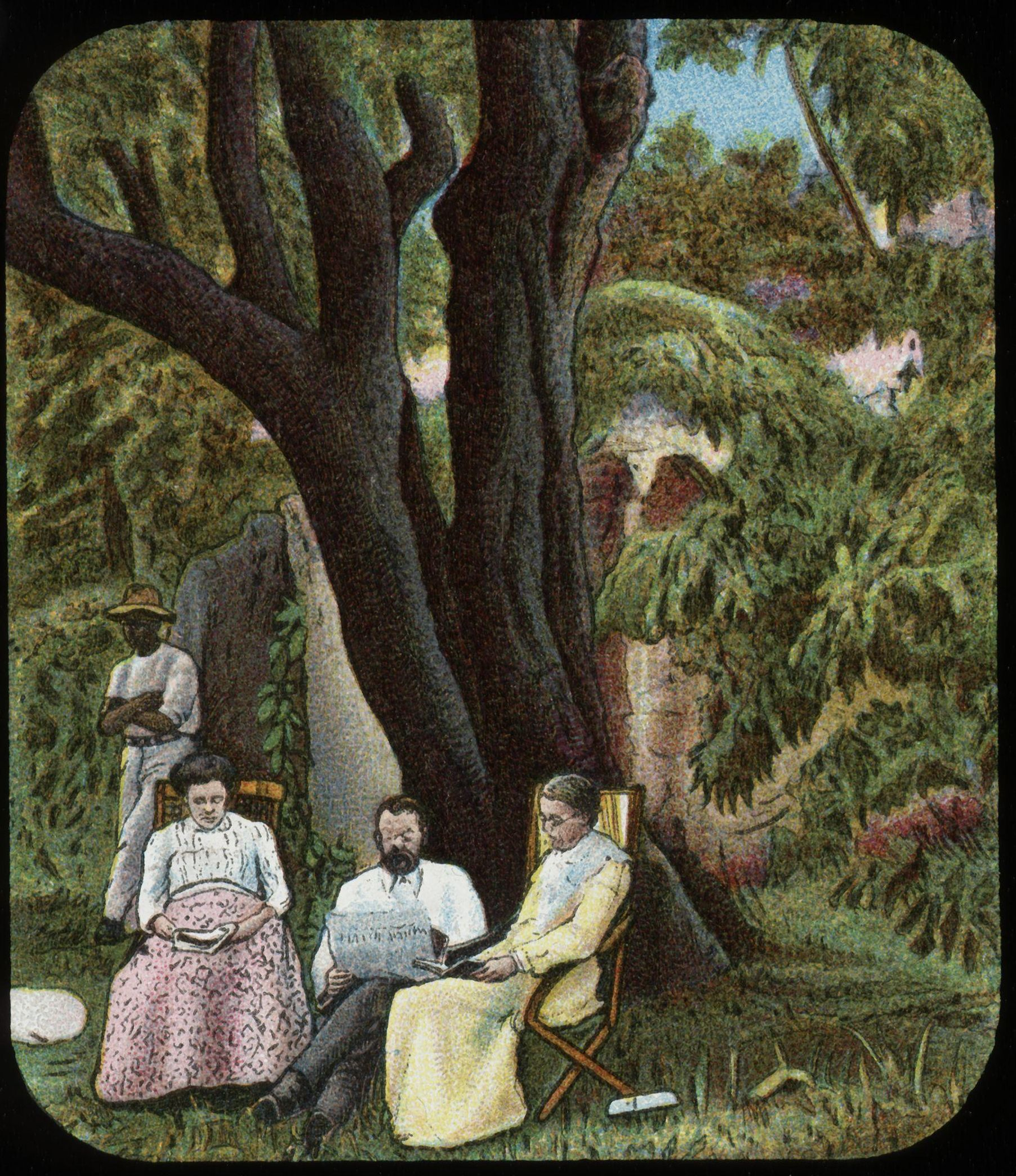
Robert Moffat sitting under an almond tree at Kuruman with Mary Moffat and their eldest daughter Mary

Robert and Mary Moffat had ten children, two of whom they adopted while in Africa: Their children included their daughter, Mary (who married David Livingstone), Ann and Robert (who died as an infant), Robert Jr. (who died at the age of 87, leaving an uncompleted, but published, work on the Tswana language), Helen, Elizabeth (who also died as an infant), James, John, Elizabeth and Jean. Their son John Smith Moffat became an LMS missionary and took over the running of the mission at Kuruman before entering colonial service. Their grandson Howard Unwin Moffat became a prime minister of Southern Rhodesia. Mary preceded Robert in death in 1871, at home in England where they had returned because of failing health. The couple also adopted children, John Mokoteri and Sarah Roby.

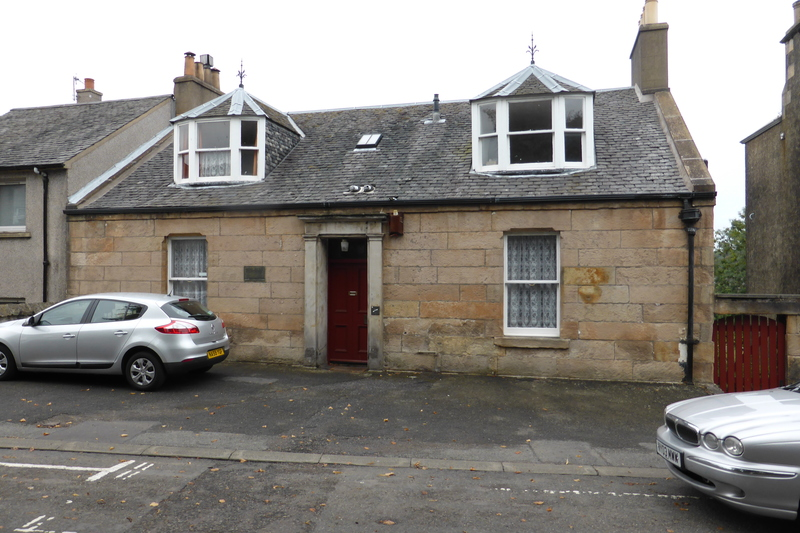
Moffat Cottage, Inverkeithing, the family home of Robert and Mary.

In 1825 Mary had lost an infant son who died at only five days old. Soon after she was informed by one of the native missionary workers that an infant native baby, whose mother had just died, was customarily buried under some rocks at a nearby hillside. Alarmed, Mary demanded, "show me the place". She was led to a hillside, carefully removed the rocks, and found the five-week-old infant crying. Grief-stricken she embraced the infant and brought it home. Her husband Robert, wondering why his wife had not attended services that day, came home to find that Mary had steadfastly adopted the child. Asking what they would name the child, Robert suggested Sarah. Mary added, "and Roby", after the woman who had informed Mary of the infant's plight. The child was subsequently christened, Sarah Roby.

== Missionary career ==
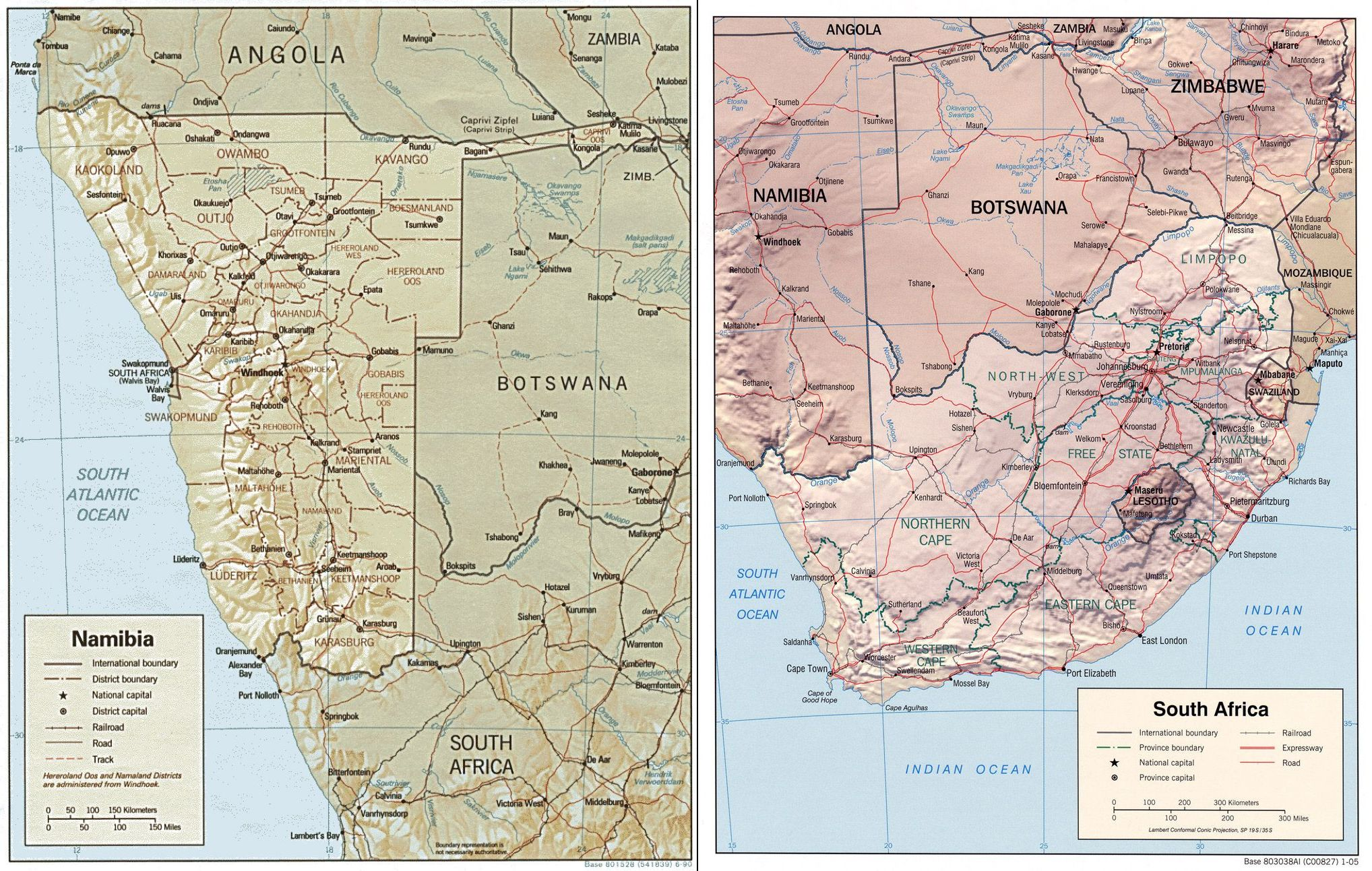
Namibia and South Africa maps

Background: In January, 1806, the long Orange River which traverses Namibia and South Africa was first crossed by missionaries of the London Missionary Society, for the purpose of doing missionary work and preaching the Gospel among the inhabitants of a wild and desolate region, often subjected to drought and subsequent food shortages, compounded by frequent tribal wars. Before the missionaries arrived the peoples of this region were often subjected to the plights of European sailors and opportunists which overall effected a hatred and mistrust towards any white man (called "hat-wearers" by the inhabitants). Through their persistence the missionaries were in large measure able to overcome such indifference and won their trust through their missionary efforts.

By September 1816, Moffat was formally commissioned at Surrey Chapel, Southwark in London as a missionary of LMS (on the same day as John Williams) and was sent out to South Africa. He made the eighty-six day voyage from England to Cape Town aboard the sailing ship Alacrity, arriving in the sweltering heat of January, which was midsummer in South Africa. His fiancée, Mary Smith (1795–1870), was able to join him three years later.

In 1817 Moffat earned a name for himself when he managed to convert to Christianity Jager Afrikaner, who previously was a notorious bandit and cattle rustler who often terrorized other tribes. Through the appeals and efforts of Moffat, Jager was subsequently baptized and subsequently assumed the name of Christian Afrikaner.

Moffat and his wife left the Cape in 1820 and proceeded to Griquatown, where their daughter Mary (who was later to marry David Livingstone) was born. The family later settled at Kuruman, to the north of the Vaal River, among the Batswana people. Here they lived and worked passionately for the missionary cause, enduring many hardships. Once he went for days without water and his mouth became so dry he was unable to speak. Often, he bound his stomach to help him endure fasting when he could not find food to eat. During this period, Robert Moffat made frequent journeys into the neighbouring regions as far north as the Matabele country. He communicated the results of these journeys to the Royal Geographical Society (Journal 25-38 and Proceedings ii). Whilst in Britain on leave (1839–43) an account of the family's experience, Missionary Labours and Scenes in South Africa (1842) was published. He translated the whole of the Bible and The Pilgrim's Progress into Bechuanas, although these translations are today sometimes considered less than adequate and relying on many colonial and cultural assumptions about the Tswana language. (Note: Today the religion in South Africa, and in neighboring Botswana, Namibia and Zimbabwe is predominately Christian. See: Religion in South Africa, Freedom of religion in Botswana, Religion in Namibia and Religion in Zimbabwe.) Moffat's task of translating English into Sechwana presented him with its own unique problems. There were no words in Sechwana for “reading” or “‘writing”’ or “book” or “‘pencil’’ or “letter”, and there was nothing in that language on which he could draw parallels. He had to construct totally new words for these ideas, which were hitherto completely foreign to their culture. Moffat's progress along these lines were greater than that of the natives and served to further compound an effort that was already difficult.

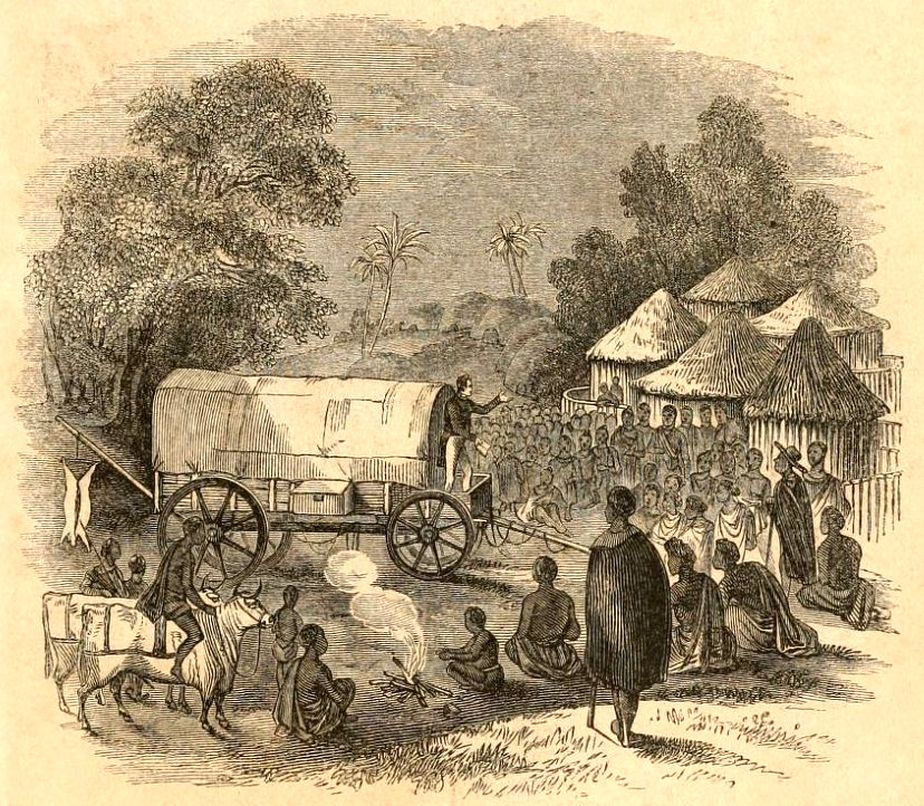
Moffat preaching at Chief Mosheu's village

During a tribal war, before learning the Sechwana language, Moffat intervened and established peace between the two warring tribes, which earned him gratitude among the native peoples and acclaim and notoriety among his missionary colleagues, both in Africa and in England. Moffat journeyed along the Kolong river, and found large groups of attentive readers who were in great want of books, which he could hardly supply. He came upon a village, one hundred and fifty miles from Kuruman, where a chief named Mosheu and his people resided. Mosheu had formally visited the Kuruman mission previously. Here Moffat preached three times to this tribe on the first day. At the gatherings Moffat answered questions to a people who reportedly were anxious to learn to read, reciting over and again what they had heard. Mosheu generously had given Moffat and his congregation a sheep the evening before, and the wives of the tribesmen made efforts to provide milk. To meet their wants, Moffat distributed spelling books among them. Moffat made great progress in introducing Christianity to the people in this region. Chief Mosheu brought his daughter to Mrs. Moffat for instruction, and his brother brought his son for the same purpose.

Construction for a place of worship began in 1830 with the laying of a foundation, but Moffat had great difficulty in securing the lumber needed for its construction, and subsequently the church was not completed until several years later.

In 1838 Moffat published his work, Scenes and Adventures in Africa in four editions over three years. The work comprehensively described the living conditions, hardships, customs of the people, and wildlife in southern Africa. Through his work, Moffat became the best-known missionary in Britain.

=== Translating and printing the Bible ===
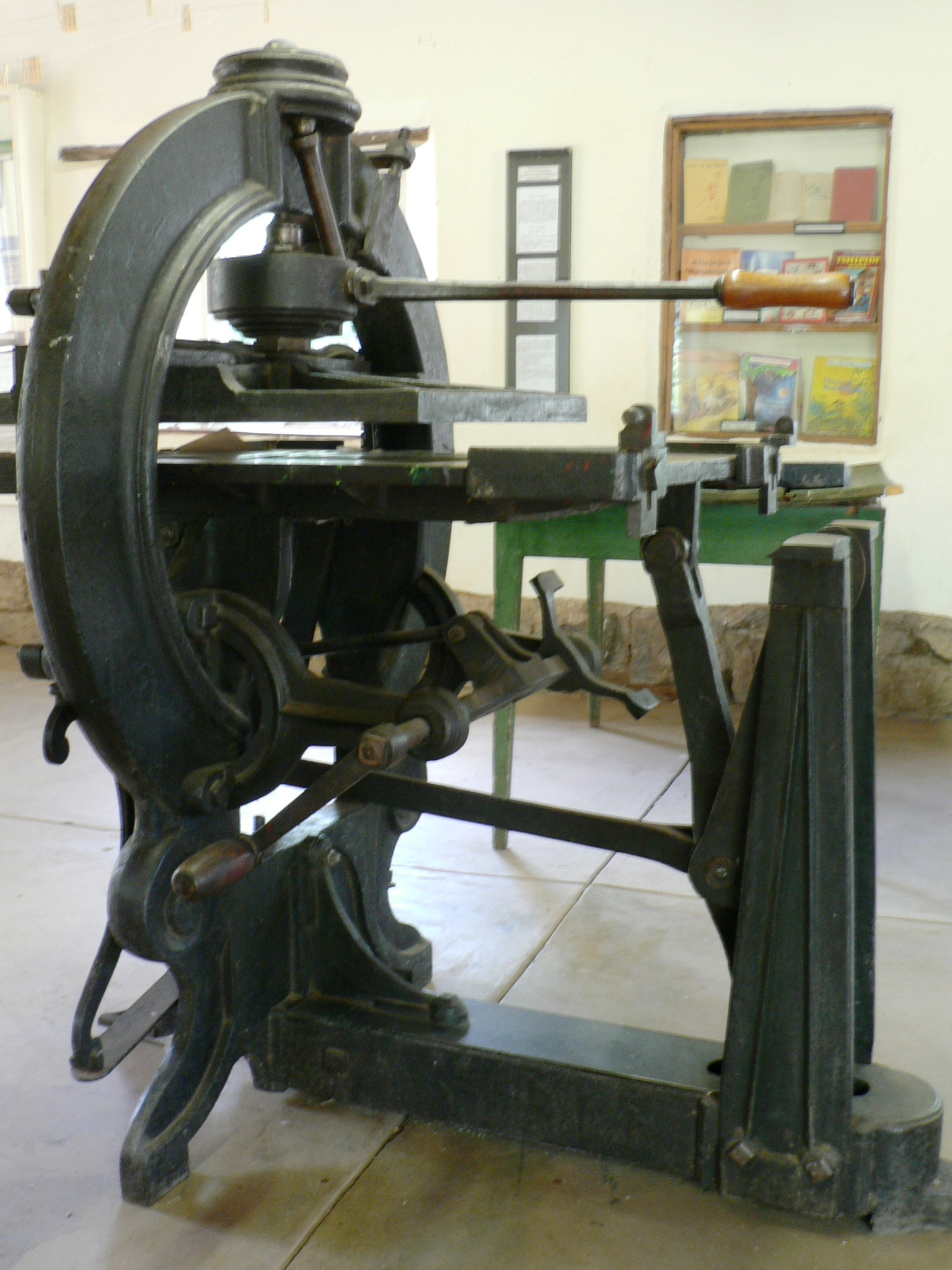
Robert Moffat's printing press, used at the Kuruman mission

One of Moffat's foremost efforts in his missionary work was spreading the word of the Gospel among the native peoples in southern Africa. To accomplish this feat he had to learn the Sechuana language, involving several years of study with the help of various translators. As a translator Moffat was an admirer of Johannes van der Kemp (1747-1811), (Note: Moffat wrote at length about Johannes van der Kemp in his 1842 publication, Missionary Labours and Scenes in Southern Africa, covering van der Kemp's twelve years in South Africa.) who was gifted in his ability to learn and translate African languages, and one of the first of three pioneers of the London Missionary Society in southern Africa who learned and translated native languages.

Among Moffat's first such efforts were the translation of the Westminster Catechism, small portions of Scripture and many hymns of the Reformation, which were prepared and sent to Cape Town in 1825, but to Moffat's disappointment, they were mistakenly sent to England after they had been printed. Moffat also wrote the first Christian hymn in Sechwana. By 1829 Moffat had translated his first book of the Bible, the Gospel of Luke, into the Sechuana language. At this time, however, he was also spending much of his time constructing a roof on a very large church structure, and with little free time on his hands, he was finally able to complete the translation.

Eager to have his manuscript printed and distributed, Moffat embarked for Cape Town to have it printed, traveling in a covered wagon pulled by oxen. With him on the journey was his wife Mary and their two young daughters, Mary and Ann, ages nine and seven respectively, who were to be placed in school in Salem, Grahamstown upon their arrival to the cape. At Grahamstown, however, he was met with disappointment when he was informed that there was no printer or ship for transport at Algoa Bay. Having no other recourse, he set off to Cape Town, some four-hundred miles east. The Committee of the London Bible Society had forwarded a letter of introduction to Cape Town informing them of Moffat's expectations upon his arrival. Moffat arrived at Cape Town on October 30 and searched far and wide for a printing press with great difficulty. He was thus forced to plead with the governor, Galbraith Lowry Cole, for help and possible use of the government's printing press, which was poorly equipped with only one competent printer, Mr. Van der Zant, at hand. Moffat received the funds necessary for paper and printing from the Bible Society. Having completed this arduous task, Moffat had acquired a working knowledge of printing in the process. An impressed John Philips saw the potential in Moffat and the prospect of having the entire Bible printed and distributed in the colony and he promised him an iron printing press, which had just arrived at Cape Town, to be taken back to Kuruman for that purpose. Moffat saw this as the crowning achievement to his effort in having the Bible translated and printed.

After years of great effort involved in translating and printing, Moffat was weary and worn out with his work at his simple printing press. He had been away from England for twenty-two years, while his African born children had never seen Scotland or England. His doctors had warned him that he was near the point of exhaustion and needed a break. He was also urged to return home by the Directors of the Missionary Society in London. Though tired, Moffat was still set on having the complete New Testament translated and printed, and the Bible Society was willing to do the printing if he would bring the manuscript to London and instruct them how to set up type for printing the Sechuana language. Having also been urged by his associates, he decided to make the move back to England. Near the end of 1838 Moffat went to Cape Town with his family, taking his manuscript and sailing for England, and arrived in London in June 1839. While the printing was underway Moffat began translating of the Book of Psalms, and stayed in England to complete it. Moffat's arduous effort involving thirty years of study and work was finally accomplished, and the knowledge that the Bible was now in the hands of the Bechwana people, and printed in their language, proved to be an accomplishment that was widely acclaimed in the London Bible Society and in many Christian circles. David Livingstone once wrote that Moffat's translations were “a great work and likely to be of permanent benefit to the people" in southern Africa.

== Final years ==
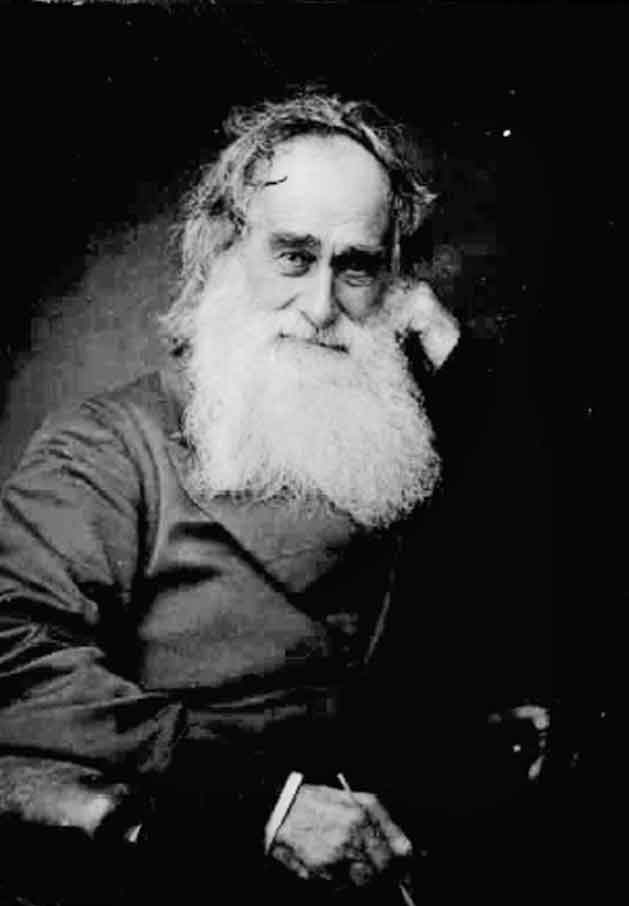
Moffat in later years

Failing health and domestic trouble back in England persuaded Moffat to finally leave his missionary efforts in Africa and he embarked for England on June 10, 1870, where he was warmly received by family, friends and admirers. Now in England, Moffat was honored at a meeting of "an unusually interesting character", conducted by the London Missionary Society, held August 1, 1870, attended by veteran missionaries at the Board-room of the London Mission House. Also a guest of honor was William Beynon of India. Here Moffat was commended for his long-devoted missionary service in Africa, and in particular, for converting the notorious bandit, Jager Afrikaner, into a Christian.

Not long after, his wife Mary died at Brixton in January 1871. For the last twelve years of his life, Robert spoke throughout England, seeking to raise interest in the missionary work in Africa, and interest in South Africa overall. He was presented to Queen Victoria twice at her request and was presented with a Doctor of Divinity degree from Edinburgh University.

When David Livingston, Moffat's son in law, died in 1873, Moffat went to Southampton to identify the remains, which arrived from Africa months after his passing. Thereafter he attended Livingstone's funeral in Westminster Abbey. On June 9, 1877, Moffat was given the honor of laying the memorial stone of the Livingstone Memorial Medical Institution in Cowgate, Edinburgh, a ceremony that was attended by a large gathering of admirers.

Robert Moffat died at Leigh, near Tunbridge Wells, on 9 August 1883, at the age of eighty-two, and is buried at West Norwood Cemetery. A memorial monument, paid for by public subscription, was erected at his birthplace in 1885.

== Legacy ==
Moffat's fifty-four years of missionary service, which produced the Bible in the Setswana language, has been widely acclaimed by the London Bible Society, the predominately Christian population of southern Africa, and in many other Christian circles.

- Residents of High Legh organise a Robert Moffat Memorial 10 km run beginning and ending at his cottage.
- His printing work in Kuruman was supported by an iron hand press that was brought to Natal in 1825 and taken to Kuruman in 1831. Rev. Moffat used it until 1870 when he retired, after which it was taken over by William Aston and A J Gould and was in use until about 1882. In 1918 it was taken to the Kimberley Public Library where it remained until it was returned to the Moffat Mission in Kuruman in 1996. It is back in occasional use printing commemorative documents.

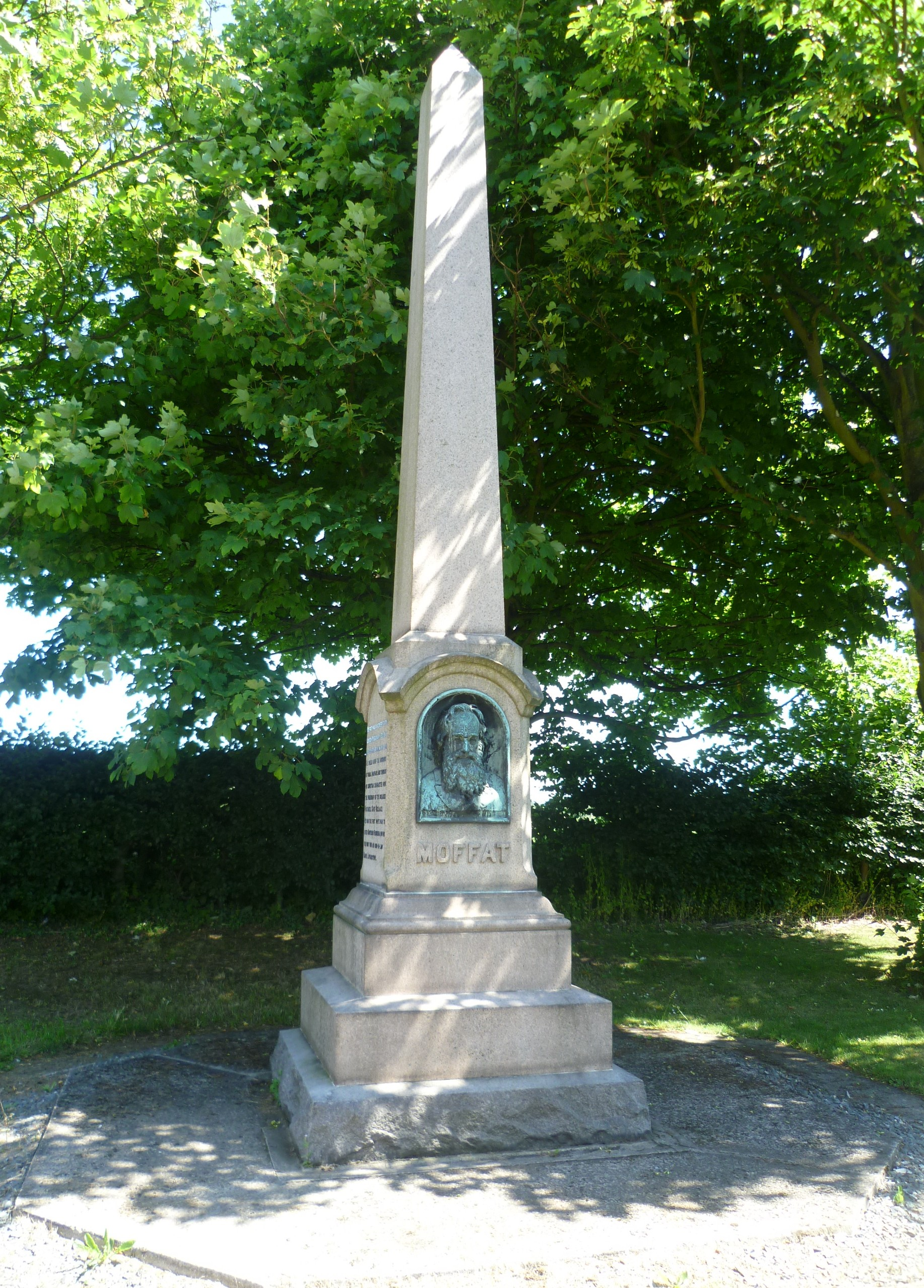
Robert Moffat Monument, Ormiston

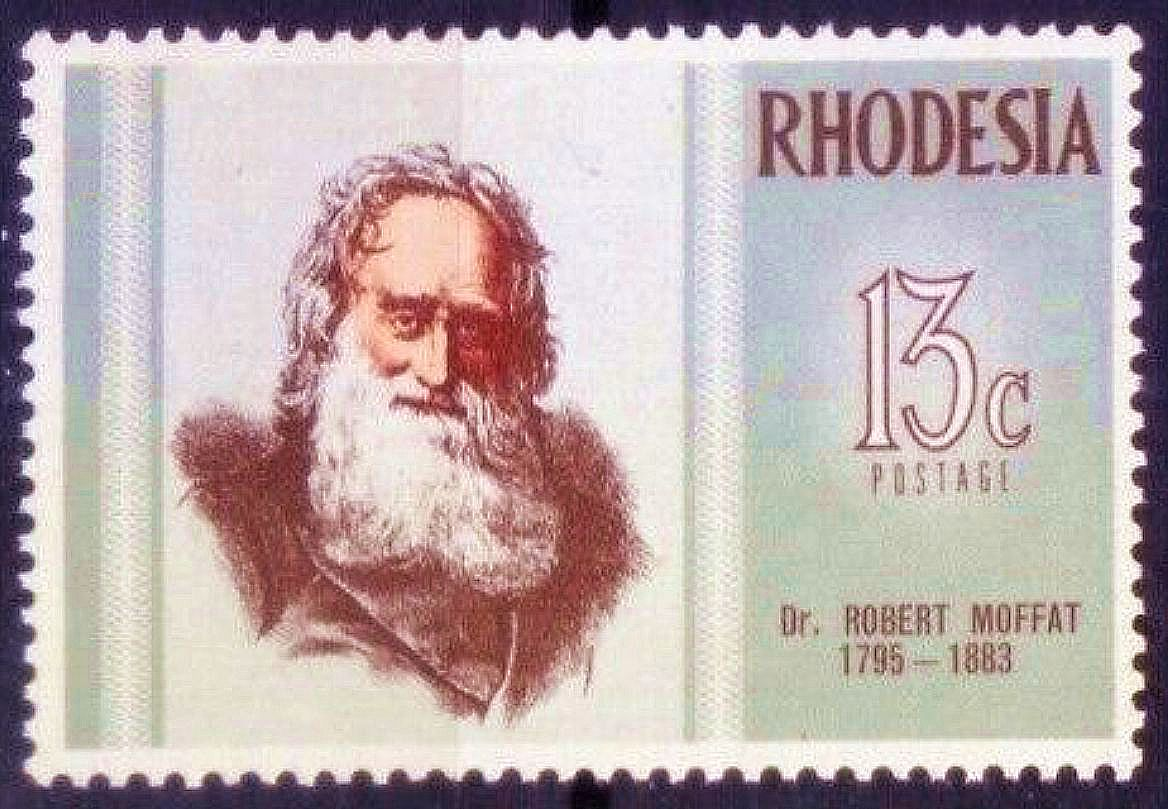
In 1972 the former country of Rhodesia issued a 13c postage stamp in Moffat's honor

== Works ==
- Moffat, Robert (1826). A Bechuana Catechism, with Translations of the Third Chapter of the Gospel by John, The Lord's Prayer and Other Passages of Scripture.
- —— (1830). Evangelia kotsa mahuku a molemo a kuariloeng ki Luka. (In Sechwana)
- —— (1831). Lihela tsa tuto le puluko tsa Yesu Kereste. (In Sechwana)
- —— (1838). Lihela tsa tihelo ea Morimo; tse ri kuariloeng mo puong ea Secuana. (In Sechwana)
- —— (1842). Missionary Labours and Scenes in Southern Africa. J. Snow.
- —— (1843). Lihela tsa tihélo ea Morimo. (In Sechwana)
- —— (1846) [1842]. Scenes and Adventures in Africa. Presbyterian Board of Publication. 1842 Publication 1843 Publication 1844 Publication
- —— (1846). The Gospel Among the Bechuanas and Other Tribes of Southern Africa. American Sunday-School Union.
- —— (1869). The White Foreigners from over the Water.
- From 1829 to 1860 Moffat kept a journal, known as The Matabele journals of Robert Moffat, edited by J.P.R. Wallis Salisbury, National Archives of Rhodesia, which delineates Moffat's travels and experiences while in Matabeleland, South Province of Zimbabwe. Its original publication is considered a rarity. It was also published in 1945 and 1976. Its January 2009 publication and reproduction can be obtained via the Cambridge University Press.

== See also ==
- William Taylor (missionary) — renowned Methodist missionary and later Bishop (1889–1896) in South Africa in the 1860s.
- John McKendree Springer (1873–1963) — Methodist missionary Bishop (1936-1944) in Africa
- John Mackenzie — Congregational Missionary in Bechuanaland
- Alfred Saker (1814–1880) — 19th century Missionary in Africa
- Alexander Murdoch Mackay (1849–1890) — 19th century missionary in Uganda
- The Historical Background to Church Activities in Zambia
- School of Oriental and African Studies (in London)

== Bibliography ==
- Bradlow, Frank Rosslyn (1987). Printing for Africa : the story of Robert Moffat and the Kurman Press. Kuruman Moffat Mission Trust. ISBN 0-620-11489-4.
- Clinton, Iris (1958). Friend of the chiefs : the story of Robert Moffat. London: Lutterworth Press.
- Davidson, Norman J. (1926). Moffat of Africa : a zealous missionary & a brave pioneer. New York: George H. Doran.
- Deane, David J (1880). Robert Moffat : the missionary hero of Kuruman. New York: F.H. Revell.
- Du Plessis, Johannes (1911). A history of Christian missions in South Africa. London: Longmans Green.
- Elbourne, Elizabeth (2004). Matthew, Henry Colin Gray (ed.). Robert Moffat — Oxford Dictionary of National Biography. Vol. XXXVIII. Oxford; New York: Oxford University Press. pp. 495–501.
- Field, Claud (1908). Heroes of missionary enterprise. Philadelphia : J.B. Lippincott Co.
- Hammond, Peter (2002). The greatest century of missions. Cape Town, South Africa: Christian Liberty Books. pp. 86–88. ISBN 978-0-95845-4919.
- Livingston, David (1858). Missionary travels and researches in South Africa. New York: Harper & Brothers.
- Livingstone, David (1912). Livingstone, the pathfinder. New York: Missionary education movement of the United States and Canada.
- Mkenda, Festo (2018). "A Protestant Verdict on the Jesuit Missionary Approach in Africa: David Livingstone and Memories of the Early Jesuit Presence in South Central Africa, chapter: A Protestant Verdict on the Jesuit Missionary Approach in Africa". Encounters Between Jesuits and Protestants in Africa, 2018. 13. Brill Publishers, for the Institute for Advanced Jesuit Studies: 59–80. JSTOR 10.1163/j.ctvbqs62t.6.
- Moffat, John Smith. (1885). Lives of Robert and Mary Moffat.
- Moffat, Robert Jr. (1864). The "standard-alphabet" problem, or, The preliminary subject of a general phonic system. London : Trübner; Cape Town : J.C. Juta.
- Moffat, John Smith (1915). The life of Robert Moffat of South Africa : founded on the biography. Vol. II. Cincinnati, Ohio: Revivalist Press.
- Morrison, James (1922). The missionary heroes of Africa. New York: George H. Doran company.
- Mullens, Joseph, ed. (1870). The Chronicle of the London Missionary Society, 1870. London Missionary Society.
- London Missionary Society (1890). The Chronicle of the London Missionary Society, 1890. London Missionary Society.
- Ripley, George; Dana, Charles A., eds. (1883). Moffat, Robert: The American Cyclopaedia: a popular dictionary of general knowledge. New York, London, D. Appleton and company. p. 692.
- Ross, Andrew C. (1998). Biographical dictionary of Christian missions. New York: Macmillan Reference USA.
- Smith, George (1921–1923). The Dictionary of National Biography, v13: Robert Moffat. Vol. XIII. Messrs. Spottiswoode & Co.
- "Lorella Rouster, Testimonies of Faith, "Steady in All Circumstances--Robert and Mary Moffatt". Sunday School Times/Gospel Herald. Cleveland, OH. Summer 2006.
- R.H.V. (1921). Moffat, Robert: Dictionary of American Biography. Vol. XIII. Oxford University Press. pp. 544–548.
- "Robert Moffat (1795 - 1883), John Mokoteri and Sarah Roby (b. 1826)". National Galleries of Scotland.
- J. P. R. Wallis. Salisbury (ed.). "The Matabele Journals of Robert Moffat, 1829–1860". Cambridge University Press.
