= CF Bezuidenhout =

South African farmer

Cornelis Frederik Bezuidenhout (24 August 1760 – 10 August 1815) was a frontier farmer in the eastern Cape Colony whose death in a skirmish with Khoi soldiers, who had been sent to arrest him. His death was the origin of the Slagtersnek Rebellion which reached its dramatic finale on 9 March 1816 under the gallows at Van Aardspos, twelve miles south of Slagtersnek.

== Life and death ==
Cornelis Frederik Bezuidenhout, known by the nickname Freek, was the fifth of seven children of Gerrit Bezuidenhout, a burgher of Graaff-Reinet, and his wife, Sophia Maria Scheepers. Freek was descendant of Wynand Leendertsz Bezuidenhout, of the Netherlands, master gardener at the Cape, and his wife, Jannetje Gerrits, of Amsterdam.

Bezuidenhout was born in the Graaff-Reinet district in 1760. As a frontier farmer, he lived in seclusion in the valley of the Baviaans River, east of Cradock. He was said to know no fear, to be full of self-confidence and decidedly arrogant and quick-tempered. As a result of his views on public affairs he came into conflict with the authorities. Unrest on the eastern frontier, caused by conflicts with the Xhosa, increased the tension, especially after the Black Circuit in 1812.

Bezuidenhout was generally known as a difficult man; he was accused by his servant, Booi, of ill-treatment and of holding back his pay due to a theft accusation against Booi. He was summoned to appear before the court at Graaff-Reinet. At first he sent poor excuses for his absence, but eventually defied the court's orders. As a result, he was sentenced in his absence by a circuit court for contempt of court to a month's imprisonment. An order for his arrest was issued and landdrost Andries Stockenström of Graaff-Reinet instructed the Deputy-Messenger of the Court to carry out the order.

Receiving no help from the Field Cornet of the ward, he proceeded to the nearest military post, commanded by Captain Andrews, armed with a letter asking for military assistance. While Bezuidenhout was preparing to resist his arrest by force, Lieutenant F Rousseau accompanied the Deputy-Messenger with a patrol of twelve Khoikhoi soldiers.

He was confronted at the Baviaans River (the present Glen Lynden) on 16 October 1815. Bezuidenhout refused to surrender and fired on the soldiers. With his mixed race son and a casual visitor, Jacob Erasmus, he sought refuge amongst the tumbled rocks of the nearby valley. He would not listen to reason and recommenced firing until he was mortally wounded by the soldiers returning the fire. His son and Erasmus, who took no part in the action, surrendered.

Bezuidenhout was buried on the farm the next day by his relatives.

There is no certainty about Bezuidenhout's wife or children, apart from one son, Gerrit Coenraad Bezuidenhout (1790–1838).

== Memorial ==
The cave in which Bezuidenhout died, and also his grave, are at Silverbrook farm, the present Glen Lynden in the Eastern Cape. The Dutch Reformed Church and the local Reddingsdaadbond erected an obelisk of red dolerite at the cave and a granite rock at the grave. These two memorials are about 200 yards apart on the road between Bedford and Tarkastad in the Eastern Cape province.

== Aftermath ==
At Bezuidenhout's funeral, his brother, Johannes Jurgen (Hans Jan) Bezuidenhout, swore to take revenge on the officials whom he held responsible for his brother's death.

He incited the whole community to rebel against the British colonial government. He wanted to chase the British and the Khoikhoi into the sea and to establish an independent state on the eastern frontier. About sixty burghers took an oath of vengeance and loyalty and took part in what became known as the Slachter's Nek Rebellion. However, most Boers did not support the rebellion. Ultimately, no more than 200 Boers supported the rebellion, only 60 showed up at Slagtersnek, and not a single shot was fired when they were confronted by British troops and loyalist Boers. Hans Bezuidenhout refused to surrender and was shot and killed at his farm, and five of the surviving ringleaders were later executed. The rebellion acquired importance as an incident in the struggle of Afrikanerdom against British domination.

== See also ==
- 1816 in South Africa
- Trekboers
- History of Cape Colony from 1806 to 1870
