= 1810 in South Africa =

- Decades: 1790s; 1800s; 1810s; 1820s; 1830s
- See also: List of years in South Africa

The following lists events that happened during 1810 in South Africa.

== Events ==
- Shaka is appointed chief of the army of the AmaMthethwa.
