= Voting district =

A voting district may be:

- An electoral district
- A geographical area assigned to a specific polling place, such as:
  - An electoral precinct in the United States
  - In elections in South Africa, a voting district associated with a specific voting station
