= 1815 in South Africa =

- Decades: 1790s; 1800s; 1810s; 1820s; 1830s
- See also: List of years in South Africa

The following lists events that happened during 1815 in South Africa.

== Events ==
- Shaka becomes king of the Zulus
- Colonial army crushes Slachter's Nek Rebellion.
- Gov. Lord Somerset forces Ngqika into alliance to prevent cattle raiding.
- 30 May - The Arniston, a British troop transport East Indiaman, is wrecked at Waenhuiskrans near Cape Agulhas while returning from the British campaigns in Ceylon

== Births ==
- 12 March - Cornelis Moll, founder of the first Natal newspaper De Natalier, is born as the 24th child in Cape Town

== Deaths ==
- 29 December - Saartjie Baartman, the "Hottentot Venus", dies in Paris.
