= 1802 in South Africa =

- Decades: 1780s; 1790s; 1800s; 1810s; 1820s
- See also: List of years in South Africa

The following lists events that happened during 1802 in South Africa.

== Events ==
- A fragile Peace of Amiens is concluded between England and France
- Drought and famine plague the AmaZulu region, causing internal strife, social dislocation, and thousands of refugees.

== Deaths ==
- 8 August – Field Commandant Tjaart van der Walt is killed in a skirmish against the Xhosa and Khoi-Khoi in the Kouga Mountains
