= 1808 in South Africa =

- Decades: 1780s; 1790s; 1800s; 1810s; 1820s
- See also: List of years in South Africa

The following lists events that happened during 1808 in South Africa.

== Events ==
- The settlement of Clanwilliam is established
- Moravian missionaries receive Groenekloof farm for work among freed slaves & Khoikhoi.
- The slave trade is abolished.
- The Perseverance Tavern opens in Cape Town, becoming South Africa's oldest pub by the time it closes in 2020.

== Births ==
- 31 January - Jacobus Nicolaas Boshoff, the 2nd president of the Orange Free State from 1855 to 1859, is born in Kogmanskloof, Montagu.
