= 1814 in South Africa =

- Decades: 1790s; 1800s; 1810s; 1820s; 1830s
- See also: List of years in South Africa

The following lists events that happened during 1814 in South Africa.

== Events ==
- 13 August - The French are defeated by the British and the Netherlands is reverted to a monarchy.
- In the complex peace treaty, the Cape Colony is permanently taken from the Dutch by the United Kingdom.
- A mail packet service is started between Great Britain and the Cape

== Births ==
- 27 May - William Guybon Atherstone, medical practitioner, naturalist and geologist, (d. 1898)
- 5 June - John Molteno, future first Prime Minister of the Cape
