= Elections in South Africa =

Elections in South Africa include elections for the National Assembly (the lower house of the Parliament of South Africa), the provincial legislatures, and municipal councils. Elections are held on a five-year cycle and are conducted by the Electoral Commission (IEC), which is an independent body established by the constitution. The most recent elections for the National Assembly and provincial legislatures were held in 2024, while the most recent elections for municipal councils were held in 2026.

In elections for the National Assembly, by voting for political parties and independent candidates, voters elect 400 Members of Parliament, who serve to represent their constituents throughout their terms of office.

In such elections, every South African citizen who is 18 or older is eligible to vote, including (since the 2014 election) those resident outside South Africa. Voters must be registered with the Electoral Commission and have a identity card or book.

In contrast, in elections for a provincial legislature or municipal council, only those resident within the respective province or municipality may vote.

The electoral system for the National Assembly and the provincial legislatures is based on party-list proportional representation, which means that parties are represented in proportion to their electoral support. Since 2024, independent candidates have also been able to stand for election. For municipal councils there is a mixed-member system in which wards elect individual councillors alongside those named from party lists. Changes to the electoral system were proposed in 2025 by an advisory body established by Parliament.

== Latest general election ==
Party	National ballot				Regional ballot				Total seats	+/–
Party	Votes	%	+/–	Seats	Votes	%	+/–	Seats	Total seats	+/–
African National Congress	6,459,683	40.18	–17.32	73	6,231,519	39.38	—	86	159	–71
Democratic Alliance	3,505,735	21.81	+1.04	42	3,439,272	21.74	—	45	87	+3
uMkhonto weSizwe	2,344,309	14.58	New	31	2,237,877	14.14	—	27	58	New
Economic Freedom Fighters	1,529,961	9.52	–1.28	17	1,556,965	9.84	—	22	39	–5
Inkatha Freedom Party	618,207	3.85	+0.47	8	688,570	4.35	—	9	17	+3
Patriotic Alliance	330,425	2.06	+2.02	5	345,880	2.19	—	4	9	+9
Freedom Front Plus	218,850	1.36	–1.02	4	234,477	1.48	—	2	6	–4
ActionSA	192,373	1.20	New	4	219,477	1.39	—	2	6	New
African Christian Democratic Party	96,575	0.60	–0.24	3	93,581	0.59	—	0	3	–1
United Democratic Movement	78,448	0.49	+0.04	2	85,618	0.54	—	1	3	+1
Rise Mzansi	67,975	0.42	New	1	70,142	0.44	—	1	2	New
Build One South Africa	65,912	0.41	New	2	69,020	0.44	—	0	2	New
African Transformation Movement	63,554	0.40	–0.04	2	66,831	0.42	—	0	2	0
Al Jama-ah	39,067	0.24	+0.06	2	53,337	0.34	—	0	2	+1
National Coloured Congress	37,422	0.23	New	1	47,178	0.30	—	1	2	New
Pan Africanist Congress of Azania	36,716	0.23	+0.04	1	40,788	0.26	—	0	1	0
United Africans Transformation	35,679	0.22	New	1	32,185	0.20	—	0	1	New
Good	29,501	0.18	–0.22	1	36,103	0.23	—	0	1	–1
#Hope4SA	27,206	0.17	New	0	16,872	0.11	—	0	0	New
Allied Movement for Change	22,055	0.14	New	0	18,393	0.12	—	0	0	New
United Independent Movement	20,003	0.12	New	0	18,907	0.12	—	0	0	New
African Independent Congress	19,900	0.12	–0.16	0	3,833	0.02	—	0	0	–2
National Freedom Party	19,397	0.12	–0.23	0	22,726	0.14	—	0	0	–2
Azanian People's Organisation	19,048	0.12	+0.05	0	18,741	0.12	—	0	0	0
African Congress for Transformation	18,354	0.11	New	0	348	0.00	—	0	0	New
African Heart Congress	16,306	0.10	New	0	3,579	0.02	—	0	0	New
Congress of the People	14,177	0.09	–0.18	0	16,768	0.11	—	0	0	–2
African People's Convention	13,195	0.08	–0.03	0	14,693	0.09	—	0	0	0
Africa Restoration Alliance	11,108	0.07	New	0	12,651	0.08	—	0	0	New
Forum for Service Delivery	11,077	0.07	+0.03	0	7,444	0.05	—	0	0	0
Democratic Liberal Congress	10,904	0.07	+0.01	0	7,022	0.04	—	0	0	0
Alliance of Citizens for Change	9,336	0.06	New	0	11,217	0.07	—	0	0	New
Action Alliance Development Party	7,802	0.05	New	0	4,600	0.03	—	0	0	New
Conservatives in Action	7,424	0.05	New	0	1,115	0.01	—	0	0	New
South African Royal Kingdoms Organisation	6,685	0.04	New	0	3,195	0.02	—	0	0	New
Northern Cape Communities Movement	6,629	0.04	New	0	7,016	0.04	—	0	0	New
People's Movement for Change	5,539	0.03	New	0	7,045	0.04	—	0	0	New
Abantu Batho Congress	5,531	0.03	New	0	3,552	0.02	—	0	0	New
Economic Liberators Forum	5,408	0.03	New	0	7,115	0.04	—	0	0	New
Organic Humanity Movement	5,241	0.03	New	0	6,457	0.04	—	0	0	New
African Content Movement	5,107	0.03	0.00	0	4,617	0.03	—	0	0	0
Sizwe Ummah Nation	5,016	0.03	New	0	4,869	0.03	—	0	0	New
South African Rainbow Alliance	4,796	0.03	New	0	7,645	0.05	—	0	0	New
African People's Movement	4,601	0.03	New	0	4,200	0.03	—	0	0	New
Able Leadership	3,867	0.02	New	0	3,161	0.02	—	0	0	New
Referendum Party	3,834	0.02	New	0	4,206	0.03	—	0	0	New
All Citizens Party	3,693	0.02	New	0	1,644	0.01	—	0	0	New
Africa Africans Reclaim	3,371	0.02	New	0	2,565	0.02	—	0	0	New
Citizans	2,992	0.02	New	0	4,084	0.03	—	0	0	New
Xiluva	2,592	0.02	New	0	1,167	0.01	—	0	0	New
African Movement Congress	2,141	0.01	New	0	1,550	0.01	—	0	0	New
Free Democrats	1,992	0.01	0.00	0	2,276	0.01	—	0	0	0
Independents					19,304	0.12		0	0	New
Total	16,076,719	100.00	–	200	15,823,397	100.00	–	200	400	0
Valid votes	16,076,719	98.69			15,823,397	99.02				
Invalid/blank votes	213,437	1.31			156,834	0.98				
Total votes	16,290,156	100.00			15,980,231	100.00				
Registered voters/turnout	27,782,081	58.64			27,782,081	57.52				
Source: Electoral Commission of South Africa, IOL

== Result in history ==
=== 1910 South Africa general election ===
Party	Votes	%	Seats
Unionist Party (South Africa)	39,766	37.65	36
South African Party	30,052	28.45	66
Labour Party (South Africa)	11,549	10.93	3
Socialist Party	448	0.42	0
Other	4,245	4.02	4
Independents	19,563	18.52	12
Total	105,623	100.00	121

=== 1929 South Africa general election ===
Party	Votes	%	Seats
South African Party	159,896	46.50	61
National Party (South Africa)	141,579	41.17	78
Labour Party (South Africa)	33,919	9.86	8
Independents	8,503	2.47	1
Total	343,897	100.00	148

=== 1994 South Africa general election ===
Party	Votes	%	Seats
African National Congress	12,237,655	62.65	252
National Party (South Africa)	3,983,690	20.39	82
Inkatha Freedom Party	2,058,294	10.54	43
Freedom Front Plus	424,555	2.17	9
Democratic Party (South Africa)	338,426	1.73	7
Pan Africanist Congress of Azania	243,478	1.25	5
African Christian Democratic Party	88,104	0.45	2
Africa Muslim Party	34,466	0.18	0
African Moderates Congress Party	27,690	0.14	0
Dikwankwetla Party of South Africa	19,451	0.10	0
Federal Party	17,663	0.09	0
Minority Front	13,433	0.07	0
Sport Organisation for Collective Contributions and Equal Rights	10,575	0.05	0
African Democratic Movement	9,886	0.05	0
Women's Rights Peace Party	6,434	0.03	0
Ximoko Party	6,320	0.03	0
Keep It Straight and Simple Party	5,916	0.03	0
Workers Organisation for Socialist Action	4,169	0.02	0
Luso-South African Party	3,293	0.02	0
Total	19,533,498	100.00	400

== History ==
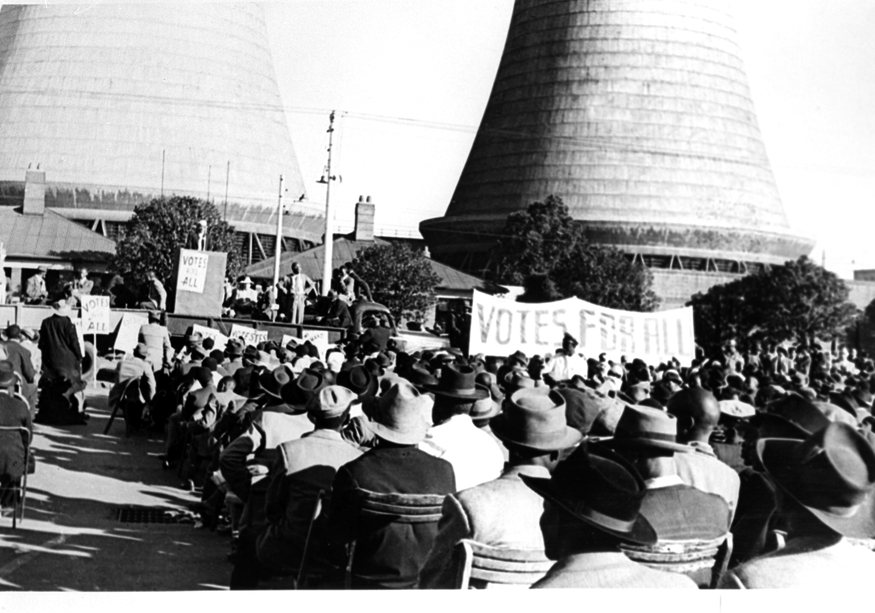
Coloured gathering in South Africa, with large banners demanding votes for all, 1954

=== Before the Union ===
When the British took over the Cape, first in 1795 and then more permanently in 1806, they inherited a large, thinly populated pastoral society that depended on the labour of slaves and a rural workforce of indigenous Khoekhoe whose condition was akin to serfdom. In 1806 the entire population of the colony consisted of fewer than 80,000 people: 26,768 whites, 1,200 free blacks (manumitted slaves), 29,861 slaves and 20,426 Khoikhoi . In 1807, the British government ended the slave trade and, finally, in 1833 outlawed the practice of slavery throughout the Empire.

Under pressure from the humanitarian lobby in the UK, acting in concert with a local missionary campaign, the government abolished the Khoekhoe's serf-like status by the declaration of Ordinance 50 of 1828. According to the government's instructions, 'all Hottentots and other free persons of colour, lawfully residing within the said Colony, are and shall be, in the most full and ample manner, entitled to all and every the rights, privileges and benefits of the law, to which any other His Majesty's subjects, lawfully residing within the said Colony, are or can be entitled.' This became known as the "Hottentots' Magna Carta". The equality of all people appeared to be assured. As a result, municipal boards set up in the colony's towns and villages from 1836 allowed any male resident who lived in a property with a yearly rent £10 or more to vote for his town board. From the very beginning, therefore, persons of color were able to participate in local elections.

This principle of a non-racial franchise was to be entrenched when the Cape was granted representative government in 1853. Part of the reason may have been give propertied Khoekhoe a greater stake in the political system. In 1850 the Khoekhoe of the Kat River Settlement had risen in rebellion. Although the uprising was defeated, it did influence the minds of colonial officials and politicians who were responsible for drawing up the 1853 constitution. The Cape's Attorney General, William Porter said: 'I would rather meet the Hottentot at the hustings voting for his representative than meet the Hottentot in the wilds with a gun on his shoulder.' In terms of the constitution of 1853, any man who owned property worth at least £25 was entitled to vote for or stand in the Cape's Parliament. By 1886 Africans made up 43 per cent of the vote in six constituencies of the Eastern Cape, and were a real political force. It was not long before white politicians began challenging the rights of Coloureds and Africans to vote. The passage of the Franchise and Ballot Act, which raised the property qualification from £25 to £75 in 1892, met with an angry response from African and Coloured voters.

These developments were not without criticism or opposition. The abolition of slavery, the declaration of Ordinance 50, and the accompanying extension of rights to the black population, were deeply resented by the white Dutch farmers of the Cape as undermining their way of life. Starting in 1834, thousands of these Boers set out on the Great Trek in the hope of leaving British control behind them. In the interior of southern Africa they would establish independent states, the South African Republic (also called the Transvaal Republic) and the Orange Free State, whose constitutions enshrined the principle of inequality between white and black in church and state.

After the Second Anglo-Boer War, the white peoples made peace and came together at the National Convention in October 1909. It brought together politicians from the Cape, Transvaal, Natal and the Orange River Colony, as well as Rhodesia. They aimed to draw up a constitution for the Union of South Africa, uniting the British possessions. The result was the South Africa Act.

Only white men were present at the National Convention; women and all other racial groups were excluded. This was in some ways unusual. Black men had enjoyed the vote in the Cape since the 1850s and – as long as they had sufficient property, income and education – continued to do so. By 1909 there were 14,388 Coloured and 6,633 African voters in the Cape. Between them they made up 14.8% of the electorate. In Natal African men also had the right to vote, but it was so constrained that it was almost theoretical. They had to prove they had property and that they were 'civilised' and had been so for seven years. The Governor might then grant them the vote. Indians also had to overcome obstacles designed to prevent them from being enfranchised. In the Transvaal and Orange Free State, only white men could vote.

The Cape argued that their non-racial franchise should be extended across the proposed Union. This was rejected by the Transvaal and Orange Free State. Finally, a compromise was arrived at, maintaining the Cape's existing voting system without extending it to the rest of the country, but insisting that this compromise was entrenched in the constitution. Africans and Coloured people would retain most of their voting rights in the Cape, but would not receive them in any other part of the Union.

African and Coloured politicians came together to resist these plans, and called on a former Cape Prime Minister, William Philip Schreiner, to lead a delegation to the UK to call for the Cape franchise to be implemented in the whole of South Africa. The delegation was unsuccessful in its appeal, despite receiving considerable support from the infant Labour Party and other liberal British organisations.

=== At the Union ===
The Union of South Africa was created on 31 May 1910 by the South Africa Act 1909, an act of the British Parliament. The House of Assembly (the lower house of the newly created Parliament of South Africa) and the provincial councils were elected by first-past-the-post voting in single-member electoral divisions. The franchise in these elections was initially the same as the franchise for the lower houses in the four colonies that had formed the Union, so there were different qualifications in different provinces.

In the Transvaal and the Orange Free State, the vote was limited by law to white men aged 21 or over. In Natal the vote was limited to men over 21 who met property and literacy qualifications; in theory, this could include non-white men but in practice only very small numbers managed to qualify: in 1910 over 99% of the electorate was white. In the Cape Province the franchise was also limited to men over 21 who met property and literacy qualifications, and non-white men did qualify in significant numbers, making up approximately 15% of the electorate in 1910. The qualifications in the Cape and Natal also excluded a substantial number of poorer white men. Only white men could stand for election to the House of Assembly, even from the Cape constituencies. The franchise rights of non-white voters in the Cape (but not in Natal) were entrenched in the South Africa Act by a provision that they could only be reduced by an act of Parliament passed by a two-thirds majority of both houses of Parliament sitting in a joint session.

=== Enfranchisement of white women and poor whites ===
In 1930 the National Party government of J. B. M. Hertzog passed the Women's Enfranchisement Act, which extended the right to vote and the right to stand for election to all white women over the age of 21. In the following year the Franchise Laws Amendment Act lifted the property and literacy requirements for white male voters in the Cape and Natal, with the result that all white citizens over 21 were enfranchised. As the exclusion of women and the literacy and property qualifications continued to apply to non-white voters, these acts had the effect of diluting their electoral power by more than doubling the size of the white electorate.

At the next following general election in 1933, Leila Reitz was elected as the first female MP, representing Parktown for the South African Party.

=== Segregation of black voters ===
In 1936 the Hertzog government enacted the Representation of Natives Act, which removed black voters from the common voters' rolls and placed them on separate "native voters' rolls". The act was passed by the required two-thirds majority in a joint session. Black voters could no longer vote in ordinary elections for the House of Assembly or the Cape Provincial Council; instead they would separately elect three members of the assembly and two members of the council. Four senators would also be indirectly elected by chiefs, tribal councils and local councils for "native areas". The Representation of Natives Act was repealed in 1959 and consequently the seats of the "native representative members" were abolished in 1960. From this point, the only political representation of black South Africans was in the Bantustan legislatures.

=== Segregation of coloured voters ===
After coming to power in 1948 the National Party engaged in a policy of removing coloured voters similarly to black voters. In 1951 Parliament passed the Separate Representation of Voters Act, which removed coloured voters from the common voters roll and instead allowed them to separately elect four MPs. The act was challenged on the basis that it had not been passed with a two-thirds majority in a joint sitting, as required by the South Africa Act, and in 1952 the Appellate Division of the Supreme Court declared it to be invalid.

A subsequent attempt by the government to circumvent the Supreme Court by creating a High Court of Parliament failed. In the election of 1953, coloured voters in the Cape cast their ballots in the same constituencies as white voters. In 1955, the government introduced a new act which reconstituted the Senate, providing the two-thirds majority necessary to validate the Separate Representation of Voters Act.

This separate representation of coloured voters in the House of Assembly was ended in 1970. Instead, all coloured adults were given the right to vote for the Coloured Persons' Representative Council, which had limited legislative powers and was permanently dissolved in 1980.

=== Republic referendum ===
In 1960 a whites-only referendum was held to decide whether South Africa should become a republic. No changes were made to the franchise with the Republic's emergence in 1961. However, with the policy of establishing Bantustans, the remaining black representation in the Senate was completely removed.

=== Tricameral Parliament ===
In 1983 a referendum on constitutional reform was held, as a result of which the Tricameral Parliament was formed, consisting of three separate houses to represent white, coloured and Indian South Africans. The existing House of Assembly was retained with its white electorate, while two new houses were created: the House of Representatives elected by coloured voters, and the House of Delegates elected by Indian voters. Many Indians and Coloureds rejected this powerless government as it was a strategy by the government to divide and rule over the nonwhite vote. Elections to these houses were conducted on the basis of first-past-the-post voting in single-member electoral divisions.

=== End of apartheid ===
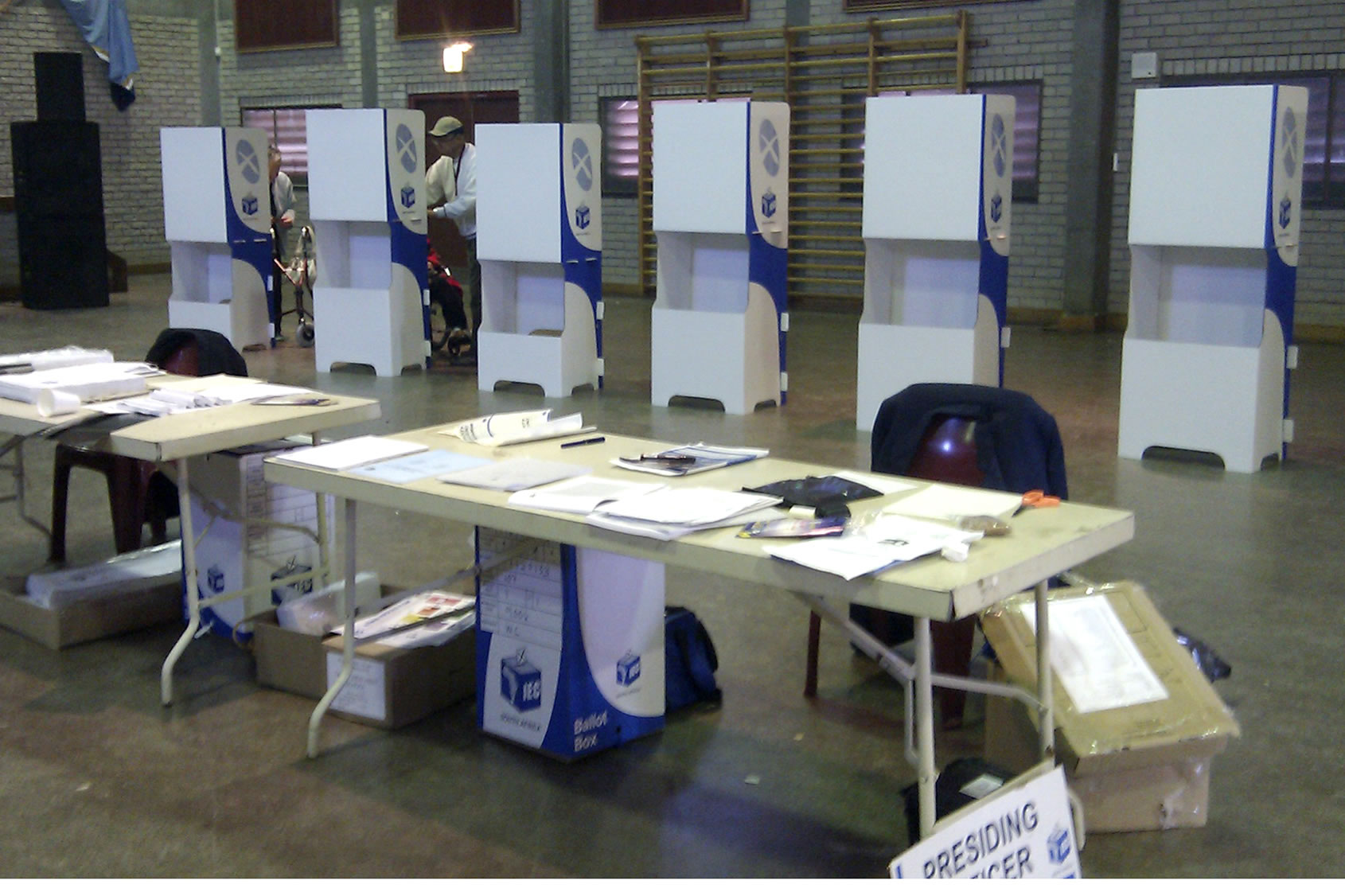
Inside a voting station in Table View outside Cape Town during the 2011 municipal election

During the negotiations to end apartheid the Interim Constitution was enacted. It introduced universal suffrage on a non-racial basis, and replaced first-past-the-post voting with party-list proportional representation. South Africans of all races took part in the first fully democratic elections in 1994. "Universal adult suffrage, a national common voters roll, regular elections and a multi-party system of democratic government" are founding principles of the 1996 Constitution of South Africa, and the right of all citizens to vote is included in the Bill of Rights.

In the post-apartheid era, the Constitutional Court has struck down two attempts by the government to deny the vote to convicted criminals in prison. The court has also ruled that South Africans living outside the country must be allowed to vote. In 2020 in the New Nation Movement case the court ruled that the pure party-list electoral system is unconstitutional because it prevents individuals from standing as candidates without joining a political party; Parliament was given two years to adopt a new electoral system. As of the 2024 General Elections a third provincial ballot was adopted. This ballot facilitates the election of independent candidates.

== Voting districts ==
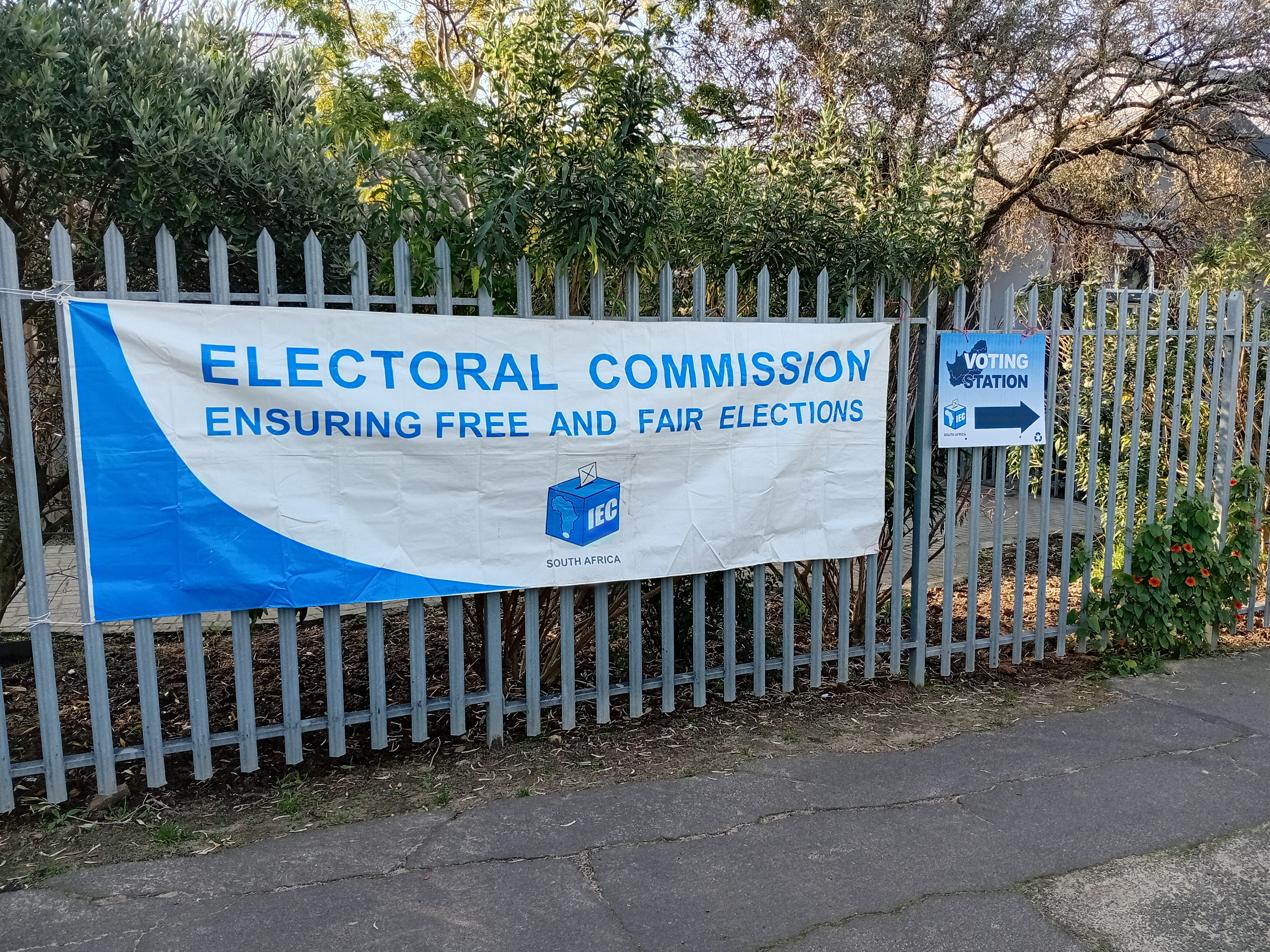
The Paarl Boys' Primary School Voting Station in Ward 4 (Paarl) in the Drakenstein Local Municipality

Each voter in South Africa is assigned to a voting district based on the voter's residence at the time that they registered to vote. Each voting district is uniquely associated with a single voting station. Voters who are outside their registered district on election day may vote at another polling station, but additional paperwork is required. Voting districts have no significance outside of the election process, and district boundaries are drawn for purposes of efficiently planning and administering elections. Urban voting districts are drawn to have a population of around 3,000 within a radius of 7.5 kilometres (4.7 mi), and rural voting districts are drawn to have a population of around 1,200 within a radius of 10 kilometres (6.2 mi).

As of 2019, there were 22,933 voting districts nationwide. The district boundaries are set by the Electoral Commission's Delimitation Directorate, and are reviewed and adjusted before each election.

== List of elections ==
Since 1910, parliamentary general elections have been held on the following dates:

- 15 September 1910
- 20 October 1915
- 10 March 1920
- 8 February 1921
- 19 June 1924
- 12 June 1929
- 17 May 1933
- 18 May 1938
- 7 July 1943
- 26 May 1948
- 15 April 1953
- 16 April 1958
- 18 October 1961
- 30 March 1966
- 22 April 1970
- 24 April 1974
- 30 November 1977
- 29 April 1981
- 22 and 28 August 1984 (House of Representatives and House of Delegates)
- 6 May 1987 (House of Assembly)
- 6 September 1989 (all three houses)
- 26–29 April 1994
- 2 June 1999
- 14 April 2004
- 22 April 2009
- 7 May 2014
- 8 May 2019
- 29 May 2024

== See also ==
- Electoral calendar
- Electoral system
