= 1812 in South Africa =

- Decades: 1790s; 1800s; 1810s; 1820s; 1830s
- See also: List of years in South Africa

The following lists events that happened during 1812 in South Africa.

== Events ==
- The settlement of Cradock is established
- The settlement of Grahamstown is founded
- The British troops stationed at the Cape along with settler militia drove the Xhosa from the Zuurveld, a district between the Sundays and the Great Fish Rivers, once again and thereby ending the 4th Cape Frontier War.
- Cape Colony's Apprentice Ordinance allows white farmers to apprentice children of laborers for 10 years, starting at age 8.
