= 1818 in South Africa =

- Decades: 1790s; 1800s; 1810s; 1820s; 1830s
- See also: List of years in South Africa

The following lists events that happened during 1818 in South Africa.

== Events ==
- Xhosas clash with the white settlers on the eastern frontier starting the 5th Cape Frontier War that only ends the following year
- Settlers move beyond the Orange River
- Beaufort West is founded
- 27 August – Cradock is founded

== Births ==
- 16 May – Willem Cornelis Janse van Rensburg, the second president of the South African Republic, is born on the farm near Beaufort West in the Cape Colony
