= 1806 in South Africa =

- Decades: 1780s; 1790s; 1800s; 1810s; 1820s
- See also: List of years in South Africa

The following lists events that happened during 1806 in South Africa.

== Events ==
- 4 January – The British expeditionary force arrives at the Cape
- 8 January – British troops land at Losperds Bay, between Bloubergstrand and Melkbosstrand in the Cape Colony.
  - The Battle of Blaauwberg takes place between the British and the Dutch colonists.
- 10 January – Governor Jan Willem Janssens capitulates and Sir David Baird is appointed Governor of the Cape
- The first regular inland postal service is started.
