= 1817 in South Africa =

- Decades: 1790s; 1800s; 1810s; 1820s; 1830s
- See also: List of years in South Africa

The following lists events that happened during 1817 in South Africa.

== Events ==
- A Dutch Reformed Church is established in Uitenhage.
- Approximately 200 Scottish artisan immigrants are brought to the Cape Colony by Benjamin Moodie. Among them is David Hume, who becomes an explorer and big-game hunter.
- AmaMthethwa chief Dingiswayo captured & executed by AmaNwandwe chief Zwide.

== Births ==
- 8 January – Theophilus Shepstone, British administrator in South Africa is born in Westbury-On-Trym near Bristol, England.
