= 1800 in South Africa =

- Decades: 1780s; 1790s; 1800s; 1810s; 1820s
- See also: List of years in South Africa

The following lists events that happened during 1800 in South Africa.

== Events ==
- The Government Gazette started printing in the Cape Colony.
- Ndlambe and his people settle west of the Fish River, previously cleared of AmaXhosa by the Dutch.

=== July ===
- The Cape Colony government launches the Cape Town Gazette and African Advertiser, restricting press freedom with heavy fines.
