= 1803 in South Africa =

- Decades: 1780s; 1790s; 1800s; 1810s; 1820s
- See also: List of years in South Africa

The following lists events that happened during 1803 in South Africa.

== Events ==
- February – The 3rd Cape Frontier War ends with an inconclusive peace that is arranged between the British administrators of the Cape Colony and the Xhosa before handing the Cape back to the Dutch
- 20 February – The Cape Colony to handed over to the Batavian Republic by the British in terms of the Treaty of Amiens
- 23 April – Jonkheer Gerard Beelaerts van Blokland arrives from the Batavian Republic in Simon's Town as solicitor-general
- Jan Willem Janssens becomes Governor of the Cape
- Advocate A de Mist is elevated to the rank of Commissioner-General to receive the colony from Britain. He is also instructed to establish a new system of government for the Cape.
- A mail service between Cape Town and Algoa Bay, present day Port Elizabeth, is inaugurated.
