= 1809 in South Africa =

- Decades: 1780s; 1790s; 1800s; 1810s; 1820s
- See also: List of years in South Africa

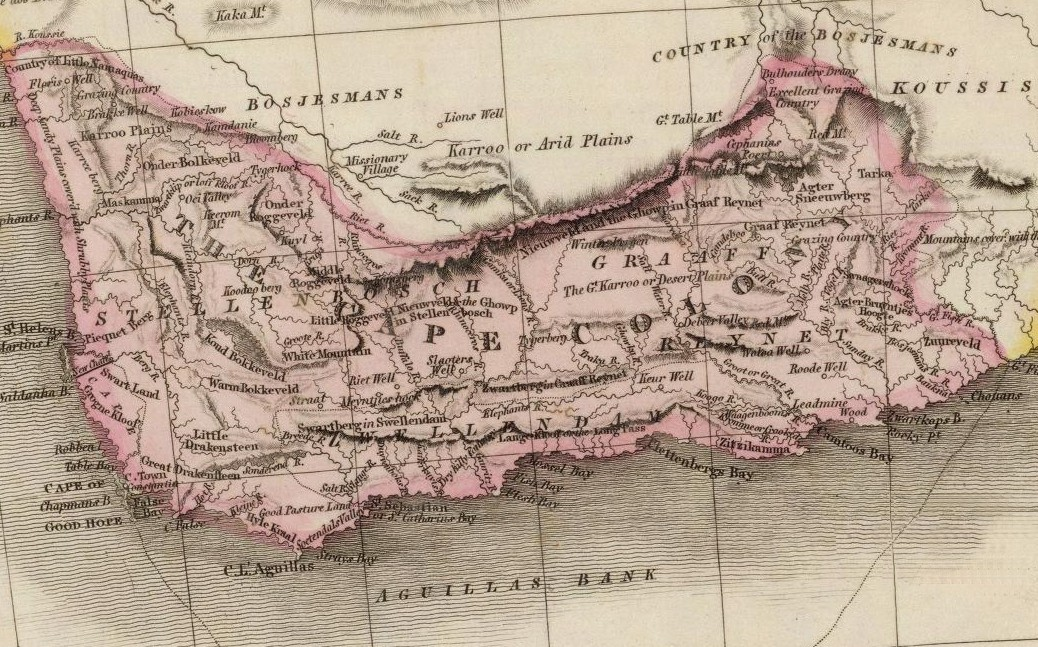
An 1809 map of Cape Colony in South Africa

The following lists events that happened during 1809 in South Africa.

== Events ==
- The governor of the Cape, the Earl of Caledon, declares that the Khoikhoi had to have a fixed residence and could not migrate between regions without written authority (Hottentot Proclamation).
- Gola's Xhosa community settles at Pramberg.
- A severe drought occurs in the eastern frontier area.
- More Xhosa clans push westward into the neutral zone between the Sundays and the Great Fish Rivers. The British send in seasoned troops.
- Dingiswayo (formerly Gogongwana) takes chieftainship from his brother, proclaims himself Chief of the AmaMthethwa, and rules autocratically.

== Deaths ==
- Jobe of the AmaMthethwa.
