= 1804 in South Africa =

- Decades: 1780s; 1790s; 1800s; 1810s; 1820s
- See also: List of years in South Africa

The following lists events that happened during 1804 in South Africa.

== Events ==
- Godongwana, son of Chief Jobe of the AmaMthethwa, fails in an assassination plot and is exiled.
- A diverse group later called the Griqua migrates from the Cape to Klaarwater, north of the Orange River.
- 25 April – The settlement of Uitenhage is established

== Births ==
- 29 May – Gottlieb Wilhelm Antonie van der Lingen, founder of the Paarl Gymnasium, is born in Cape Town
