= New Nation Movement NPC v President of the Republic of South Africa =

South African legal case

New Nation Movement v President
- Logo of the Constitutional Court
- Court: Constitutional Court of South Africa
- Full case name: New Nation Movement NPC and Others v President of the Republic of South Africa and Others
- Decided: 11 June 2020
- Citation: [2020] ZACC 11

Case history
- Prior actions: [2019] ZAWCHC 43, 2019 (5) SA 533 (WCC) (17 April 2019)
- Appealed from: High Court of South Africa, Western Cape Division

Court membership
- Judges sitting: Cameron J, Froneman J, Jafta J, Khampepe J, Madlanga J, Mathopo AJ, Mhlantla J, Theron J, Victor AJ

Case opinions
- The Electoral Act 73 of 1998 is unconstitutional to the extent that it requires that adult citizens may be elected to the National Assembly and Provincial Legislatures only through their membership of political parties. This declaration does not have retroactive effect and is suspended for 24 months for Parliament to act.
- Decision by: Madlanga J
- Concurrence: Jafta J
- Dissent: Froneman J

Keywords
- independent candidates; passive suffrage; proportional representation

New Nation Movement NPC and Others v President of the Republic of South Africa and Others, [2020] ZACC 11, is a decision of the Constitutional Court of South Africa, handed down on 11 June 2020, which declared that the Constitution requires that citizens be allowed to stand for election to the National Assembly and provincial legislatures as independents without having to join or form a political party. The declaration was suspended for 24 months to allow Parliament to modify the electoral laws to comply. The majority judgment was written by Justice Madlanga and a concurring opinion was written by Justice Jafta; these opinions were supported by eight of the nine judges hearing the case. Justice Froneman filed a dissenting opinion.

== Background ==
Before the ruling, elections for the National Assembly and provincial legislatures were conducted by a system of closed list proportional representation ("list PR"). Under this system a voter casts their vote for a party, not an individual candidate. Seats in the legislature are allocated to parties in proportion to the votes they receive, and filled from an ordered list of candidates submitted by the party. There is no provision for independent non-party candidates.

The list PR system was introduced by the Interim Constitution for the 1994 general election which marked the end of apartheid. Transitional provisions of the final Constitution of South Africa, adopted in 1996, extended this system to the 1999 general election. For elections after 1999, Parliament was to determine the electoral system, subject to the requirement that it result, in general, in proportional representation.

In 2002 the Cabinet appointed an Electoral Task Team led by Frederik van Zyl Slabbert to propose an electoral system and draft electoral legislation. The majority report of the Task Team proposed a system of mixed-member proportional representation in which 300 MPs would be elected from multi-member districts, and 100 MPs would be appointed from party lists in a compensatory manner to ensure the proportionality of the overall result. The minority report of the Task Team proposed to retain the existing list PR system by way of a constitutional amendment. Ultimately Parliament decided to retain the existing system, but did so by way of an ordinary amendment to the Electoral Act and did not amend the constitution.

In 2019, the High Court of South Africa, Western Cape Division, Cape Town dismissed an application by the New Nation Movement‚ the Indigenous First Nation Advocacy SA and Chantal Revelle. The three wanted the high court to declare that the Electoral Act 73 of 1998 was unconstitutional as that latter did not allow individuals other than political parties to stand as candidates in national and provincial elections.

== High Court case ==
New Nation Movement PPC and Others v President of the Republic of South Africa and Others [2019] ZAWCHC 43

== Judgment ==
Justice Madlanga said in his majority judgement for the Applicants, the Court was not here to decide which electoral system was better, the choice of electoral system is to be decided by the parliament in terms of sections 46(1)(a) and 105(1)(a) of the Constitution. The Court would, however, be able to decide whether the election system chosen by the parliament was constitutional.

He said two constitutional issues needed to be addressed by the court in making their decision. Firstly, is one's right to freedom of association, guaranteed in section 18 of the Constitution, limited by the Electoral Act, making access to public office available only through membership of a political party. And secondly, are the rights enshrined in section 19(3)(b) of the Constitution limited by the Electoral Act.

Justice Madlanga first addressed what was written in Subsections 19(1) and 19(3)(b) of the Constitution:

"1. Every citizen is free to make political choices, which includes the right— (a) to form a political party; (b) to participate in the activities of, or recruit members for, a political party; and (c) to campaign for a political party or cause."

"2. Every citizen has the right to free, fair and regular elections for any legislative body established in terms of the Constitution."

"3. Every adult citizen has the right— (a) to vote in elections for any legislative body established in terms of the Constitution, and to do so in secret; and (b) to stand for public office and, if elected, to hold office."

He interpreted that there was a conflict between the rights granted in Subsection 19(1) and those in 19(3) as they are interconnected. He started out by stating in subsection 19(1), the use of the word "included" by the drafters versus the word "are", expresses that there are more rights than those listed. The applicants argued that the paragraphs (a) to (c) of section 19(1) are examples of political choice and does not cover other things that are protected such as the choice not to form a political party. Therefore, section 19(3)(b), the applicants argued, is in conflict as it limits your political choices as described in 19(1).

Justice Madlanga then looked at relevance of Section 18 of the Constitution (Freedom of Association) with regard to the content of section 19(3)(b). In previous cases, Doctors for Life and UDM I, principally calls for a harmonious reading of sections 18 and 19(3)(b). The justice discussed whether even though Section 18 allows for freedom of association, does it not also allow for the right not to associate, a "negative right". He quoted international constitutional cases covering the interpretation of Article 11 of the Convention for the Protection of Human Rights and Fundamental Freedoms (European Convention) and African Court on Human and Peoples' Rights (ACHPR), where persons were forced to associated against their wishes and in concluding decisions, the right to negative association was recognized. He also argued that section 39 of the Constitution does allow foreign law to be considered in interpreting the Bill of Rights.

Closer to home, he quotes The Law Society of the Transvaal v Tloubatla 1999 were Justice Van Dijkhorst held that:

"[T]here is no reason in my view to restrict the meaning of our clause on the freedom of association merely to the positive. The Constitution was intended to grant freedoms, not restrict them. I hold therefore that section 18 of the Constitution also protects the right to refrain from association."

He also discussed the respondents argument that if one did not like the choice of parties, it was inexpensive to form ones own. The justice dismissed this argument again stating that:

If it is an individual's fundamental right to be free to associate with whomsoever she or he wishes, surely it must equally be one's fundamental right to be free not to associate with anybody whatsoever.

He argued that there were advantages to being a member of a political party but that there also impediments such as having to toe the party position, etc. Quoting Section 15(1) (Freedom of Thought) of the Constitution, being coerced to join a political party could go against a person's conscience. In discussing the applicant Ms. Revell's argument, he stated that "in being free of those shackles will make Ms Revell directly answerable to her nation, not to a political party."

In outlining a remedy, he argued that constitutional invalidity must follow, arguing against the idea that the judicial branch was interfering in the legislative process. He argued there was no legislation occurring at the moment to change the electoral system and that Speaker, in her affidavit, affirmed that, hence no there was no judicial interference. Therefore, under section 172(1)(a) of the Constitution, the court has the power "to declare that any law or conduct that is inconsistent with the Constitution is invalid to the extent of its inconsistency". In order not to invalidate the previous elections, he declared invalidity from the date of the judgement and when setting a period of suspension, decided on 24 months as opposed to 36 months as suggested by the Speaker if a ruling went against the respondents. A decision was made for the Applicants, and orders issued.

=== Dissenting judgement ===
Justice Johan Froneman, the only dissenting justice in the judgement, agreed that the leave to appeal to the court must be granted but expressed that he would dismiss the applicants' appeal. He believed the judge's interpretation of applicants arguments were flawed when they claimed that section 19(3)(b) of the Constitution, the right "to stand for and, if elected, to hold office" must be exercised and therefore that section made the Electoral Act invalid.

Froneman started by stating that the right "to stand for public office and, if elected to hold office" under section 19(3)(b) of the Constitution should be seen in the context of a right of the citizen to stand for, and not of one of an individual citizen to stand for, and hold political office. And only when one considers the context of that section of the Constitution and others, can one determine what electoral system fits best and whether the Election Act is constitutional.

He states that in Section 1(d) of the Constitution, that in addition to universal suffrage, national voters roll, and regular elections, it refers to a multi-party system of democratic government by the election of public office bearers in legislatures and that a multi-party system means just that. Section 236 of the Constitution states also,

"To enhance multi-party democracy, national legislation must provide for the funding of political parties participating in National and Provincial Legislatures on an equitable and proportional basis."

Elsewhere in Section 42(3) of the Constitution, he sees a multi-party system of democracy described as an elected official representing a group of people,

"The National Assembly is elected to represent the people and to ensure government by the people under the Constitution. It does so by choosing the President, by providing a national forum for public consideration of issues, by passing legislation and by scrutinizing and overseeing executive action."

It also excludes a one-party system or authoritarian system. He stated that if the constitution stated there were to be groupings other than a multi-party system of democratic government, then it would be prescribed but in his opinion, there were no provisions.

Section 157(2)(a) clearly states that in the case of local government elections, the Constitution states a combination of proportional representation and a system of ward representation.

He stated that the Constitution allows us to participate in the democratic process other than elections and therefore provides for other participatory elements. It provides for a way to participate if one's interests are neglected by political parties or where one finds it hard to participate, by employing section 17, the right to assembly, demonstration, picket and petition. There are also provisions in Sections 84(2)(g) and 127 of the Constitution that provides for the calling of national and provincial referendums.

There he states,

"Based on these constitutional values and norms it seems fair to conclude that the right to stand and hold elective office in terms of section 19(3)(b) is an individual right to represent the people in a multi-party system through the medium of political parties that results, in general, in proportional representation."

Assessing the applicants' contention that the Electoral Act is unconstitutional because it fails to provide for something more, independent candidates, Justice Froneman examined the rights of citizens in the three areas of section 19 of the Constitution. He disagreed with the consenting justices contention when they declared that once a citizen is forced to vote for a political party in section 19(3)(b), their rights, in section 19(1) "Every citizen is free to make political choices..", are divested of free choice when forced to choose a party even if they don't want too. He insisted that these rights were distinct and not overlapping and that choosing to exercise or not exercise the rights had independent consequences.

He said, in reading the Constitution's context and purpose, it is hard to find, in its representation of representative, participatory and direct democracy, for groupings other than political parties forming a multi-party system. In saying that, he said that does not say other systems cannot work, those other systems would have to complement not replace the constitutionally stated multi-party democracy.

He stated that the rights granted in section 19 indicate what the South African electoral system should look like. One of universal suffrage, multi-party democracy, and proportional representation to be constitutionally compliant but not what electoral arrangements there should be.

When reading sections 46–47, 105-106 and 157-158 of the Constitution together, he stated that a clear idea is given about the types of electoral systems required at national, provincial and municipal levels. The national and provincial levels indicate an equal voice to all in how they are represented indicating clearly, one of proportional representation, every vote counts. At municipal level, section 157(2) does not prescribe a mixed system but leaves it up to parliamentary legislation to decide if it is permissible, it as long as there is proportional representation.

He stated that sections 46 and 105 of the Constitution does not permit a mixed system at national and provincial level arguing that even though it isn't mentioned, that can equally mean that the non-party representation is prohibited and that independent candidates are allowed as long as they are elected through proportional representation. He argued that if independent candidates are allowed to stand for office, it would be constitutionally challenged in the future.

== Decision ==
A decision on an appeal from the High Court of South Africa, Western Cape Division, Cape Town was made and the following orders were issued by the Constitutional court:

1. "Leave to appeal is granted.
2. "The appeal is upheld.
3. "The order of the High Court of South Africa, Western Cape Division, Cape Town is set aside.
4. "It is declared that the Electoral Act 73 of 1998 is unconstitutional to the extent that it requires that adult citizens may be elected to the National Assembly and Provincial Legislatures only through their membership of political parties.
5. "The declaration of unconstitutionality referred to in paragraph 4 is prospective with effect from the date of this order, but its operation is suspended for 24 months to afford Parliament an opportunity to remedy the defect giving rise to the unconstitutionality.
6. "The Minister of Home Affairs must pay the applicants' costs in the High Court and this Court, such costs to include the costs of two counsel."

== Reactions ==
=== Parliament ===
A spokesperson for the National Assembly said,

"We will study its practical implications in relation to its obligations to the legislature."

and,

"Parliament had led a notice to abide by the court's decision, together with an explanatory memorandum. The explanatory memorandum addressed, amongst others, the time required for processing legislation, if amendments to the existing Electoral Act were required, and requested the court's consideration in this regard."

=== Political parties ===
Democratic Alliance (DA) national spokesperson Solly Malatsi said,

"We support any efforts that seek to strengthen our democracy."

United Democratic Movement leader Bantu Holomisa said,

"This judgment may necessitate that we introduce a mixed system like at local government level. IEC and parliament will have to divide SA into constituencies."

Congress of the People spokesperson Dennis Bloem said the judgment was a victory for democracy his party having campaigned inside and outside parliament for its change.

"We have always said it's unconstitutional. This judgment will give all citizens the right to exercise their democratic right to stand for elections and represent their constituencies."

EFF leader Julius Malema said that independents currently run as candidates in municipal elections and the same procedure needs to be found for provincial and national elections. He was quoted on Twitter saying,

"We must just find a perfect way of practicing it nationally to strengthen our democracy."

ANC spokesperson Pule Mabe said the party was still studying the Courts judgement.

=== Electoral Commission ===
The Electoral Commission of South Africa chairperson, Glen Mashinini welcomed the clarity given by the court and was an opportune moment for the country's maturing democracy. Mashinini said,

"The court gave parliament 24 months to revise the legislation and the Electoral Commission stands ready to provide technical assistance into this process."

and,

"The Electoral Commission welcomes the clarity the court has provided to the interpretation of the rights of citizens to stand for public office. We will study the judgment in detail to reflect on its full implications for the current electoral system and legislative framework governing national and provincial elections."

=== Other bodies ===
The New Nation Movement (NNM), who were the first applicant involved in the challenge, said through its co-ordinator, Bulelani Mkohliswa,

"This ruling is not about the NNM but is about the democracy that South Africa has been craving for such a long time. There have been missing pieces in our democratic puzzle but with this ruling, we are completing that puzzle."

Electoral Commission of SA (IEC) Chief electoral officer Sy Mamabolo said his commission stood ready to assist parliament to review the Electoral Act. He stated that the change would necessitate a new investment in an infrastructure that had taken years to build.

The Council for the Advancement of the South African Constitution (CASAC), an amicus curiae in the case before the constitutional court, while welcoming the change, believes even if the electoral system changed, it would still be hard for independent candidates to win a seat. Its spokesperson Lawson Naidoo said if independent candidates won and wanted to be president, parties would have to nominate and vote for them,

"The reality is that political parties are very strong in the South African political system and that's not going to change as a result of this judgment."

Political analyst from the University of South Africa Professor Dirk Kotze commented on the judgement saying this means change had to happen and that some reforms identified in the Van Zyl Slabbert report published in January 2003 was the place for parliament to start. He said,

"Most people have been in favour of a more directly representative system‚ where representatives are directly elected by voters."

Stefanie Fick, Director of the Organisation Undoing Tax Abuse (OUTA) said they were pleased with the ruling adding,

"This ruling must be used to drive new electoral law that improves transparency and the accountability of people elected to be MPs, as Parliament is where meaningful oversight ought to take place.

One SA leader Mmusi Maimane believed that the ruling meant the end of political parties dominating the parliament. and,

"I'm convinced that if we move like this we would be able to achieve the outcomes of reforms that we need in this country. We think politicians are the only ones competent to run the country, which has become a problem. We need the sports fraternity, we need business people, we need academics, we need a diversity of South Africans, then truly [can] we build democracy by the people. And truly then [can] we build the most agile state [to] put in the values of one SA. Ideology is not agile. So when the world changes, you can't change with it. That's why those who are stuck in a communist environment keep back, and when the world changes they believe the state must be at the centre of development. Then they say, we still need SOEs till the end. Those who are libertarian, like the DA, when the world changes, where you realise if you privatise health care you end up in a situation where the poor can't access health care, they refuse to change."

The People's Dialogue leader Herman Mashaba and Johannesburg's former mayor said about the judgments ruling for the current political parties,

"The fallout they would experience from any form of direct accountability would be disastrous for them, given the poor calibre of candidates that political parties put forward to represent the people of South Africa."
