= Hottentot Proclamation =

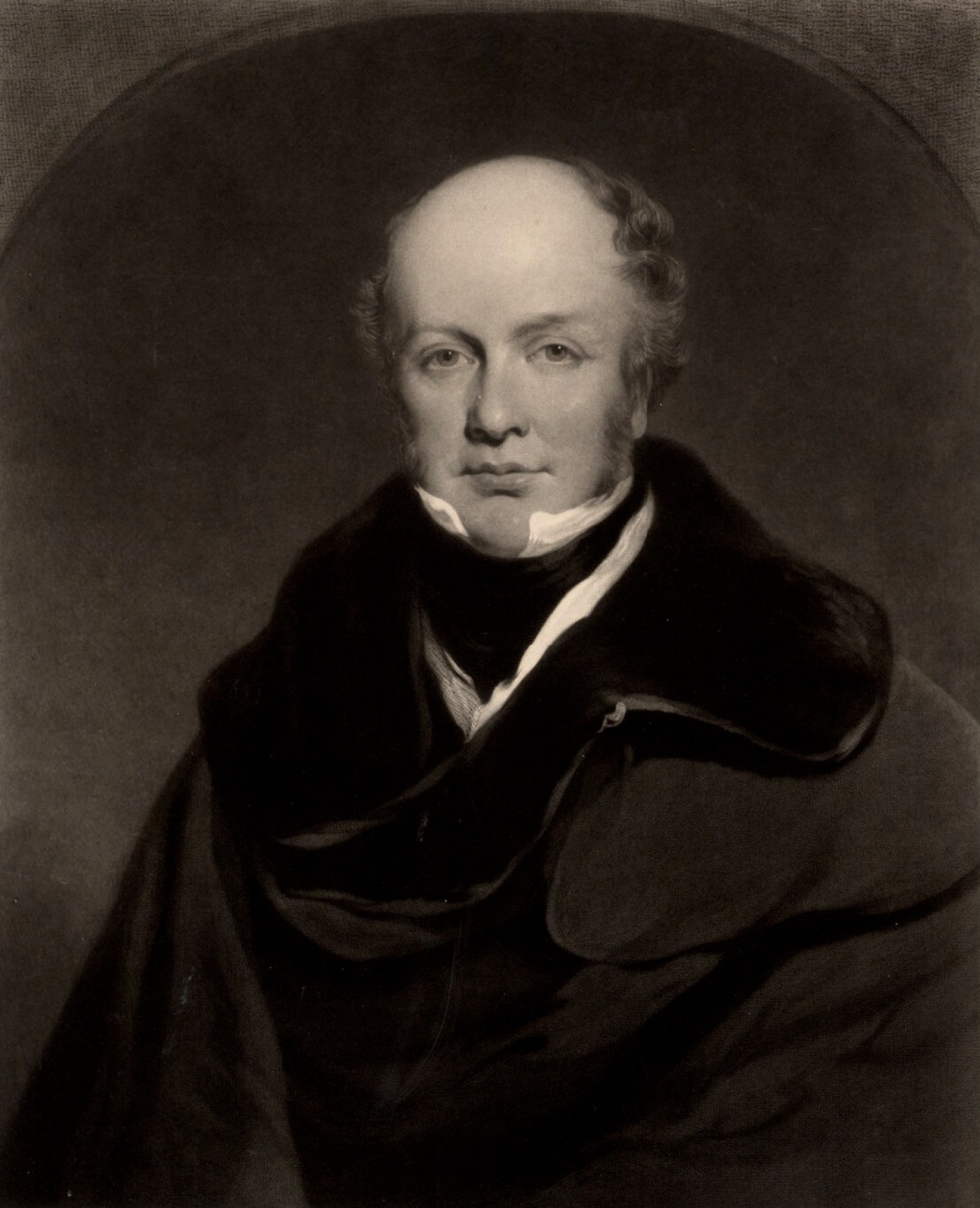
Lord Caledon, who issued the decree

The Hottentot Proclamation (also known as the Hottentot Code, the Caledon Proclamation or the Caledon Code) was a decree issued by governor of the Cape Colony Lord Caledon on 1 November 1809 to restrict the movement of Khoekhoe people (often referred to as Hottentots) living in the Cape Colony. Issued to assist Afrikaner landowners in controlling the movements of their slaves, who were mostly of Khoekhoe descent, the decree was the first in a series of colonial legislation designed to restrict the rights of Khoekhoe in the colony. It was repealed in 1828 by Ordinance 50.

== Background ==
The Hottentot Proclamation was implemented during a period of rising abolitionist sentiment among the general public in Britain, which had led in part to the passage of the Slave Trade Act 1807 through the British Parliament. Thus, governor of the Cape Colony Lord Caledon ensured the decree appeared to be different from the slave codes passed by the Dutch colonialists which had previously controlled the Cape Colony. The Proclamation stipulated that its aim was to fully integrate Khoikhoi into the colonial economy:

[F]or the benefit of this colony at large, it is necessary that not only the individuals of the Hottentot nation in the same manner as the other inhabitants should be subject to proper regularity in regard to their places of abode and occupation, but also that they should find an encouragement for preferring entering the service of the inhabitants to leading an indolent life, by which they are rendered useless both for themselves and the community at large.

Written contracts had to be registered documenting the employment of Khoikhoi labourers for periods of one month or longer. The decree also claimed to provide a safeguard against the mistreatment of Khoikhoi labourers at the hands of Afrikaner land owners, making it compulsory that they were paid for any services that they provided.

According to the Apprenticeship of Servants Proclamation of 1812, in support of the Hottentot Proclamation, white settlers could apprentice and employ a Khoikhoi child without paying them from the age of eight to eighteen years if the child was an orphan, destitute or grew up on the employer's property.

== Implementation ==
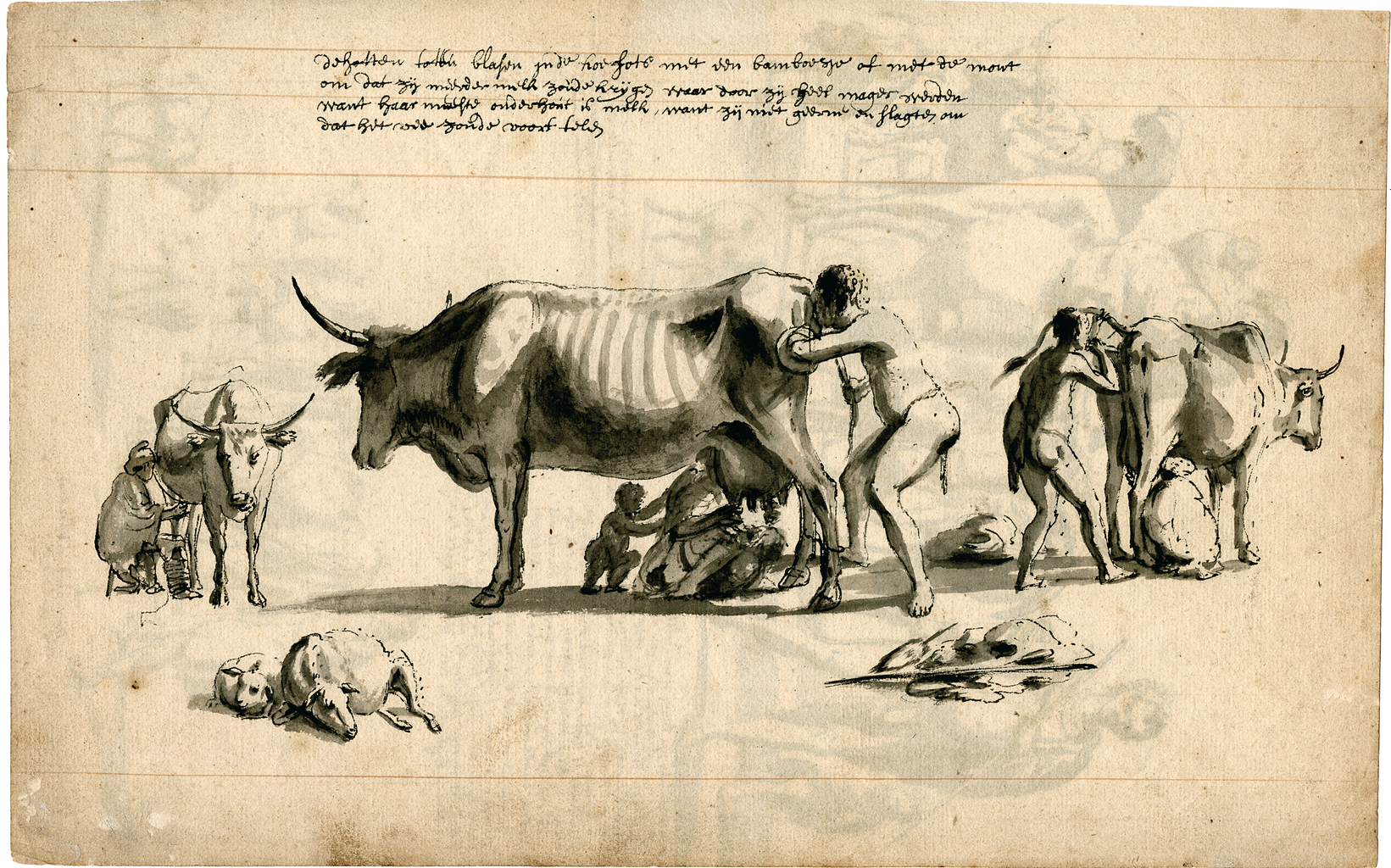
An illustration of a group of Khoikhoi milking a cow

Earl of Caledon imposed the Caledon Code in his capacity as the first Governor of the Cape Colony after the Battle of Blaauwberg in 1806. The eastern and north-eastern districts of the Cape Colony were most affected by the declaration since most of the Khoikhoi population was based in these areas.

It stated that the Khoikhoi were to have a “fixed place of abode” and that they could not travel freely, requiring a passport if they were found outside of their stipulated area:

The Hottentots going about the country, either on the service of their masters, or on other lawful business, must be provided with a pass, either of their commanding officer, if in the military service, or the master under whom they serve, or the magistrate of the district, on penalty of being considered and treated as vagabonds; and moreover, the tenor of a Proclamation of the 17th of October 1797, respecting soldiers, sailors, servants, &c. as well as military deserters, is to be strictly attended to in regard to Hottentots going about the country; so that every one is to ask a pass from any Hottentot that happens to come to his place, and in case of his not being provided with it, to deliver him up to the field-comet, landdrost or fiscal, in order to act as after due inquiry they shall feel incumbent to do.

This prevented them from moving away from farms in which they worked as slaves unless their passes were signed by their employer. If asked to produce a pass by a white settler, they were to present the document verifying that they had permission from their employer to be away from home.

== Repeal ==
Ordinance No. 50 of 1828 repealed the Proclamation in that year.

The movement to issue Ordinance No. 50 was led by Dr John Philip, who continually worked against the discriminatory treatment of indigenous South Africans, and, together with British missionaries protested the Hottentot Proclamation. Even while he was back in Britain, from 1826 to 1828, Philip fought for the emancipation of tribes in the Cape. Ordinance No.50 freed the Coloured slaves from the pass system while Black people in accordance to the Ordinance No. 49 of 1828 were still issued passes for the sole purpose of seeking work.

All the slaves living in British colonies were to be freed after serving what is described as a period of apprenticeship, which only ended in 1838 in the Cape Colony.

== Aftermath ==
The repeal of the code would later set the stage for the abolition of slavery in all parts of the British empire via the Slavery Abolition Act 1833.

== See also ==
- Parliament of the Cape of Good Hope
- 1809 in South Africa
