= 1801 in South Africa =

- Decades: 1780s; 1790s; 1800s; 1810s; 1820s
- See also: List of years in South Africa

The following lists events that happened during 1801 in South Africa.

== Events ==
- The Truter-Somerville Expedition of Petrus Johannes Truter, William Somerville, John Barrow and Samuel Daniell with missionaries Jan Matthys Kok and William Edwards reaches Dithakong near current day Kuruman

== Births ==
- 7 September – Sarel Cilliers, a Voortrekker leader and preacher is born on a farm near Paarl, Cape Colony
