= 1816 in South Africa =

- Decades: 1790s; 1800s; 1810s; 1820s; 1830s
- See also: List of years in South Africa

This article lists events from the year 1816 in South Africa.

== Events ==
- In early 1816, Ntsikana Gaba, an influential amaXhosa diviner, converted to Christianity. He renounced his former practices and began holding daily worship services, for which he composed some of the first Christian hymns in the Xhosa language. A visitor from the London Missionary Society, Rev. Joseph Williams, attested in September 1816 that "the man Ntsikana daily meets with a devoted circle for prayer."
- Around July, Shaka becomes king of the Zulu people after the death of his father, Senzangakhona kaJama. With the support of Dingiswayo, chief of the Mthethwa, Shaka seized power by killing his half-brother and rival, Sigujana. His accession marked the beginning of major military reforms that saw the Zulu army expand significantly within a year.

== Deaths ==
- 9 March – Cornelius Faber, Hendrik Prinsloo, Theunis de Klerk, and brothers Stefanus and Abraham Bothma are hanged for the Slagter's Nek Rebellion. The executions were ordered by Colonel Jacob Glen Cuyler. During the public hanging, four of the five ropes broke; the condemned men were forced to wait for some hours amid public agitation before being hanged a second time.

== See also ==
- Years in South Africa
