= History of South African citizenship =

South African citizenship has been influenced primarily by the racial dynamics that have structured South African society throughout its development. The country's colonial history led to the immigration (or importation) of different racial and ethnic groups into one shared area. Power dispersion and inter-group relations led to European dominance of the state, allowing it to directly shape citizenship although not without internal division or influence from the less empowered races.

== Dutch colonial rule ==
In 1652, the Dutch East India Company (abbreviated V.O.C., in reference to the original Dutch version of this title or DEIC) established the first permanent European settlement in the Cape region. At that time, the pastoral group known as the Khoikhoi inhabited the region along with other Niger-Congo peoples who had emigrated from the Northwest approximately 1500 years prior. The Dutch formally purchased land from the Khoikhoi in 1671 and Cape Colony was established.

As the colony developed and expanded, slaves from other African regions as well as parts of South and Southeast Asia were imported to work in agriculture and in domestic service. During the 18th century, the growth in population of white settlers was nearly identical to increases in slave populations, despite the fact that the slaves were predominantly male.

Thus the society under Dutch rule was a mixture of races and ethnic groups: the indigenous Khoikhoi peoples, the white settlers of European descent who eventually became Afrikaners, and the heterogeneous slave populations from various other parts of Africa and Asia. Since only members of V.O.C. had the right to land ownership or political power, the colony's system of law internalised and perpetuated racial inequalities. The constrictive, domineering administrative policies of the V.O.C. led to considerable settler resentment of authority structures, and the libertarianism associated with the Boers (South Africans of Dutch descent).

== British colonial rule ==
The imposition of British colonial rule created a tense dynamic between the two European groups. They mutually occupied the position of dominant coloniser in the early society, but their linguistic, cultural and ideological differences created friction between the two groups. In the case of the Boers, this imposing force served to unite their fractioned groups under a single identity against a common enemy.

=== British authority ===
The British aimed to adjust the cultural life of colonial society to the legal realities of British rule. This meant imposing their system of beliefs, their organisational methods, and their political idiosyncrasies on the colonised groups as well developing new ones. After an unsuccessful attempt to claim the colony in 1795, the British permanently established their control between 1806 and 1815. An influx of British pioneers entered the colony, introducing the English language to the region and setting up new frontier settlements. In 1822, the court system was Anglicised, posing a significant disadvantage to Afrikaans-speaking individuals. Incentives were offered to teachers who conducted their lessons in English, resulting in a transition from Dutch to English education with adverse long-term effects on Afrikaner education levels. The British introduced the Roman Dutch law system. Law enforcement and court systems were centralised by the British, countering the Boer tradition of small, local courts and decentralised democracy.

=== Abolition of slavery ===
Under British rule, relations with the Afrikaners were harmonious at first, but a growing ethnic tension began as the British began to assert their political and cultural dominance over the Boers. While British colonists maintained their British citizenship, this status was extended neither to the Boers nor the African and Asian populations who all became British subjects.

Nevertheless, the British also imported liberal, post-Enlightenment values. The Slave Trade Act 1807 abolished the slave trade throughout the British Empire and established humanitarian guidelines restricting slave-owners. Despite protests by slave owners, the slaves were legally liberated throughout the British Empire by the Slavery Abolition Act 1833. The emancipation of the Khoikhoi and other non-Europeans was the result of considerable pressure from various missionary groups within the colony rather than from the metropole. The introduction of circuit courts specifically for upholding claims from former slaves against former masters led to the "Black circuit" commissions, which aroused considerable public outcry when the law was actually enforced in cases of black men against white men.

Between 1809 and 1823, Du Pré Alexander, 2nd Earl of Caledon established a series of policies addressing the pressing issue of landlessness that emancipation had created. Collectively, these policies formed a paternalistic code that gave the former slaves some protection but also relegated them to the lowest status in society. In 1828, Ordinance 50 made it possible for blacks and Asians to own property, abolished the requirement that they carry identification passes, and required employers to provide contracts for all work. While the content of this law was clearly intended to aid the former-slave populations, these measures were implemented minimally if at all and inequalities between the races persisted.

=== Violent conflict between Boers and British ===
Despite the shared sense of white superiority, the English-speaking groups and the Afrikaners were pitted against one another in competition for political, economic and cultural dominance. This conflict led to the hardening of the two groups' respective national identities and eventually resulted in the expansion beyond the Cape Colony, two wars and the creation of a New South African state.

In 1835, a group of Boers left the colony in search of a new territory to establish their own society free from British control. These individuals were known as the Voortrekkers ("pioneers") and their exodus became known as the Great Trek. While this endeavour proved hazardous and less productive than they may have envisioned, it provided a model for subsequent Boer migrations away from British sovereignty and the establishment of separate Boer states (Orange Free State, South African Republic, Colony of Natal). These republics had their own governments and independent migration policies regulating the influx of workers from India, Asia and elsewhere in Africa.

Over the course of the 19th century, tension increased between the British Empire and these autonomous Boer communities. The British pursued expansionist policies, annexing Natal in 1845 but recognising the independence of the other two republics until 1877 when a Zulu insurrection threatened the South African Republic. In 1880, the First Boer War erupted between Transvaal Boers and British troops, resulting in relatively heavy losses on the British side leading to a truce in 1881. After two decades of uneasy peace between the groups, military conflict broke out again in 1899 in what would be the Second Boer War. This war significantly deteriorated the Boers' land and resources, a result largely attributable to the British enacted 'scorched earth' tactics. Nevertheless, the resistance had been strong enough to change the British's policy regarding the Afrikaners from suppression to concession and incorporation into the government of the colony.

Throughout the two wars, the British portrayed themselves as fighting in defence of the African populations as well as for the interests of the Empire. Reformist rhetoric wooed black support for the war and the British did not hesitate to use this resource, despite the mutual commitment to leave the blacks out of the war. Britain's decision to abandon their promises to the African population at the end of the war indicated a coming shift in the racial dynamic of South African citizenship and its struggle.

== South African state ==
=== Surrender of the Boers ===
The British colonial government met with the two Boer governments on 15 May 1902 to determine the terms of the Boers' surrender. While Britain refused to give up their annexation of the Boer republics, it did agree to repatriation, the limited protection of the Afrikaner language in the education and court system, the right to keep firearms, the right to property, exemption for land tax funding war expenditures, and to refuse the natives (blacks) political enfranchisement unless a white majority already existed (Article 8).

=== Milner regime ===
Sir Alfred Milner was the governor of the Cape Colony at the turn of the 20th century. In reaction to the incorporation of the Boers back into the colony, Milner instated a series of attacks on the citizenship of Africans, Asians and people of mixed race. Territorial separation of whites and blacks became a principle of land ownership. It also removed blacks' right to select their own political representative in the federal legislature and instituted a government-picked politician for them. These reforms were designed by a group called the Lagden Commission. While they were rejected initially, modified versions of these reforms were later implemented by General J. B. M. Hertzog (South Africa's third prime minister). Following the Zulu rebellion in 1906, the Natal Native Code was streamlined and applied universally among African and Indian populations. In effect, this gave the Government unlimited control over these populations while revoking their suffrage. This sparked protest from both minority groups. Mohandas Gandhi's led several non-violent demonstrations against laws requiring Indians to carry finger-print passes.

=== Pre-Apartheid segregation ===
The South Africa Act 1909 established the Union of South Africa under British dominion as from 31 May 1910, giving it increased autonomy from the metropole. This act unified the four provinces under one legislative body and gave suffrage to non-white groups, although its franchise policies further disempowered blacks in the Cape. Colour bars were instituted in 1911, relegating blacks to low-income occupations with little to no prospect for upward mobility. By restricting land purchase to specific reserves, the Natives Land Act, 1913 effectively forced African populations off of the land that would allow them to sustain any level of self-sufficiency, thereby making them dependent on the labour market for their livelihood.

General Louis Botha was appointed the first prime minister of South Africa in 1910. He pushed a series of racial segregationist bills targeting the African populations. The Mines and Works Act of 1911 prohibited blacks from organising into labour unions and from striking, while simultaneously reserving prime categories of work for white people. The Natives (Urban Areas) Act of 1923 imposed segregation in the residential areas of cities and reduced blacks access to urban centers in general. General Hertzog's subsequent government held these policies restricting black subjects, but made relatively little effort to increase segregating policy and focused more on creating a national (white) image. It did, however, remove Africans' limited rights to direct parliamentary suffrage in the Cape Province.

== Apartheid policies regarding race ==
The Apartheid ideology was developed by Werner Eiselen as an alternative to the policies of racial segregation which still allowed for a multi-racial society. Apartheid was a system of relocating Africans to what were supposedly ethnically homogenous reservations and then fostering individual nationalities for each of these ten different groups. This process was accompanied by a set of acts designed to coerce black groups into this new system and maximise their separation from white society while maintaining their economic exploitation (see Apartheid Legislation in South Africa). The core of the Apartheid system was the Group Areas Act of 1950 which divided the state into race-specific partitions.

=== Bantustans ===
The formation of the first Afrikaner-only government in 1948 also coincided with the introduction of the Apartheid institution by which Africans were to be segregated and differentiated from the white population in all possible respects. One of the most drastic components of this ideology was the establishment of Bantu homelands to which all Africans were regulated. This forced blacks to live in "tribal" reservations, thereby separating them from the white populations and realigning their citizenship directly to their particular reservation or "bantustan". Ten separate bantustans were designated, each with its own "homogenous" group. In 1970, the Black Homelands Citizenship Act effectively cancelled all black South African citizenship because these homelands became technically autonomous and self-governed.

=== Pass laws ===
The Population Registration Act 30 of 1950 required all citizens to carry identification passes that detailed their race. This limited black, Indian and Asian mobility because it restricted their access to white areas.

=== Education ===
The Bantu Education Act of 1953 reformatted the education system to prepare the black youth for racial submission to the white population. Education was historically the jurisdiction of the Christian missionaries, but this act ceded its control to the state, who then used it to manipulate the black national identity

=== Marriage and sexuality ===
Sexual relations between races were restricted by both the Prohibition of Mixed Marriages Act (1949) and the Immorality Act (1950), illustrating the social stigmas and fears surrounding black sexuality.

== Post-Apartheid ==
With significant pressure from both internal and external sources, the Apartheid regime was dismantled by the National Party (NP) in the early 1990s. Serious negotiations between the National Party, the African National Congress (ANC) and the Pan Africanist Congress (PAC) took place in an effort to produce a new democratic system that perpetuated racial equality but did not leave the whites dangerously vulnerable to resentment-fueled discrimination or violence.

=== Creation of a new constitution and bill of rights ===
Following the extension of universal suffrage and the subsequent election of the first ANC government, Parliament developed a new constitution and bill of rights. The first chapter of this constitution establishes the South African commitment to democratic values, human rights and rule of law. The second chapter is the Bill of Rights and it describes the democratic freedoms that the state must uphold. This includes the right to education in each of South Africa's official languages, the right to a healthy living environment, as well as the right to free movement and residence.

== Citizenship ==
South African citizenship has primarily been founded on conceptions of racial entitlement and lawful residence. The development of migration restrictions attached to different racial groups in the Cape and the Boer Republics provided the precursor to South African citizenship: Union citizenship. The immigration laws reacting to the influx of Asian in the early 20th century provided the unidirectional basis of South African citizenship. This identification method developed out of the Transvaal immigration bureaucracy became to standard throughout the other republics after the unification in 1909. The restrictive nature of union citizenship led to the establishment of a categorical citizenship that lacked any positive rights.

The Bill of Rights created in 1996 established the modern characteristics of South African citizenship. It utilises a combination of the principles of jus soli and jus sanguinis. Children born in South Africa to parents who are both permanent residents (but not citizens) or to one parent who is a citizen will obtain citizenship via jus soli. Children born outside the country to at least one citizen-parent can obtain citizenship if the South African population authorities are properly notified about the birth. For many individuals born to non-permanent residents can apply for South African citizenship through the naturalization process which has eight primary requirements:

- Valid permanent residence permit or exemption.
- One year's ordinary residence in the Republic of South Africa immediately prior to the application.
- In addition 4 years of physical (actual) residence in the RSA during the eight years before the application (excluding the year of ordinary residence).
- If married to a South African spouse, two years of permanent residence and two years of marriage to the South African spouse immediately prior to the application.
- Intends to continue to reside in the Republic or falls within the further categories specified in section 5(1)(e).
- Be of good and sound character.
- Able to communicate satisfactorily in any one of the official languages of South Africa.
- Have adequate knowledge of the duties and responsibilities of a South African citizen.

== See also ==
- Apartheid in South Africa
- History of South Africa
- South African nationality law
