= 1813 in South Africa =

- Decades: 1790s; 1800s; 1810s; 1820s; 1830s
- See also: List of years in South Africa

The following lists events that happened during 1813 in South Africa.

== Events ==
- Adam Kok III's people assert the name Griqua.
- Court proceedings are now opened to the public in the Cape Colony.
- A Dutch Reformed Church is established in George.
- Cape Town Free School founded for needy white children.
- 2 November - Lord Charles Henry Somerset is appointed Governor of the Cape.

== Births ==
- 19 March - David Livingstone, explorer and missionary, is born in Blantyre, South Lanarkshire, Scotland
- 1 May 1813 - João Albasini, an Italian trader, Bantu commissioner and the white chief of the Magwamba tribe, is born in Portugal
