= 1805 in South Africa =

- Decades: 1780s; 1790s; 1800s; 1810s; 1820s
- See also: List of years in South Africa

The following lists events that happened during 1805 in South Africa.

== Events ==
- The Napoleonic Wars break out between France and the United Kingdom
- July – A British expeditionary force sets sail from Great Britain to re-occupy the Cape Colony
- 28 April – The Huguenots consecrated the Strooidakkerk (thatched church) in Paarl
- 24 December – A British warship arrives at the Cape Colony and attacks 2 supply ships
