= 1790s in South Africa =

- 1770s 1780s « 1790s » 1800 1801
- List of years in South Africa

The following lists events that happened during the 1790s in South Africa.

== Events ==
=== 1790 ===
- More Xhosa clans started crossing the Great Fish Riverin search of better grazing

=== 1791 ===
- 29 June – Johan Isaac Rhenius is appointed acting Governor of the Cape Colony

=== 1792 ===
- A Dutch Reformed Church is founded in Graaff Reinet
- A Moravian Mission is founded at Genadendal
- 23 June – Sebastiaan Cornelis Nederburgh and Simon Hendrik Frijkenius, both Commissioner-Generals of the Dutch East India Company arrive in the Cape to settle disputes between the free citizens and the company.
  - 3 July – Sebastiaan Nederburgh is appointed Commissioner-general of the Cape

=== 1793 ===
- Xhosas clash with the white settlers at the Fish River starting full out war, 2nd Cape Frontier War
- War is declared by the victorious French revolutionaries against the Dutch Prince of Orange
- Britain goes to war against France
- 2 September – Abraham Josias Sluysken is appointed the Governor of the Cape. He is the last governor under Dutch East India Company rule
- 8 October – After a series of victories, the Dutch commandoes led by Landdrost Honoratus CD Maynier, could not force the Xhosa over the Fish River and peace was accepted and thereby ending the 2nd Cape Frontier War.

=== 1795 ===
- The Dutch East India Company is in financial ruins
- 29 January – Farmers expelled the officials of the Dutch East India Company and established an independent government at Graaff-Reinet
- 18 June Swellendam follows Graaff Reinet and declares a republic under Hermanus Steyn
- The Netherlands is invaded by the French under the leadership of Napoleon Bonaparte
- A republic is declared by Dutch revolutionaries and the Prince of Orange flees to England
- 16 September – British forces under General Sir James Henry Craig seizes the Cape Colony for the Stadtholder Prince William V of Orange
- The republics of Graaff Reinet and Swellendam reject the British and the British army is sent in
- The start of free trade was announced

=== 1797 ===
- 5 March – The Cape becomes a British colony
- 4 May – Sir John Barrow, author and explorer, arrives at the Cape Colony
- 23 May – The first British Governor of the Cape Colony, Lord Macartney, arrives.

=== 1798 ===
- The first Post Office is established in the Cape Colony
- The Dutch East India Company is liquidated
- The first mosque in southern Africa is established in Dorp Street by Tuan Guru
- A Dutch Reformed Church is founded at Swellendam
- 22 November Dundas is appointed Governor of the Cape

=== 1799 ===
- Farmers of Graaff Reinet revolt against the British
- The 3rd Cape Frontier War starts between white settlers and the Xhosas and only ends in 1801
- The British build Fort Frederick in Algoa Bay
- The eastern cape Khoikhoi revolt
- The London Missionary Society set up their first station at Zak River
- First recorded landing on the Prince Edward Islands by French sealers
- 5 November – HMS Sceptre, wrecking, Table Bay
- 18 December – Sir George Young is appointed Governor of the Cape

== Births ==
- 19 December 1792 – Hendrik Potgieter, Voortrekker leader, is born in Graaff-Reinet, Cape Colony
- 1 March 1797 – Gerhardus Marthinus Maritz, Voortrekker leader, is born in the Graaff-Reinet District
- 21 June 1797 – Christoffel Brand, politician, (d. 1875)
- 27 November 1798 – Andries Pretorius, Voortrekker leader, is born in Graaff-Reinet, Cape Colony

== Deaths ==
- 1793 – Baron Joachim van Plettenberg, Governor of the Cape Colony, dies
