= Ordinance 50 =

Ordinance 50 of 1828 was a law issued by the British colonial government of the Cape Colony that lifted several legal restrictions that had been imposed on the Khoisan and other Coloured people, ensuring equality before the law of “every free inhabitant in the Colony". The law removed the requirement for non-white people to carry passes, affording freedom of movement, and allowed non-whites to choose their employers and own land. It formally repealed the Hottentot Proclamation of 1809. This in effect affirmed that Coloured and Khoisan populations were entitled to the same legal rights as other free inhabitants of the colony.

The ordinance was brought about after lobbying by the London Missionary Society, which had campaigned against White mistreatment of the Khoisan and Coloured inhabitants. Members of the Society documented evidence of abuse and inequality against non-whites and percolated the information across Britain.

The law became the foundation of the tradition of non-racialism under the law within the Cape Colony, and could not be easily repealed without permission of the imperial government in London. As slavery was abolished in 1834, and the Cape Colony expanded after the Xhosa Wars, so too did those who fell under these protections.

== See also ==
- Hottentot Proclamation
- Pass law
- Cape Qualified Franchise
- History of the Cape Colony from 1806 to 1870
- History of South African citizenship
