= Electoral Act, 1998 =

Law in South Africa

Electoral Act 73, 1998

Parliament of South Africa
- Long title: To regulate elections of the National Assembly, the provincial legislatures and municipal councils; and to provide for related matters
- Citation: Act No. 73 of 1998
- Enacted by: Parliament of South Africa
- Royal assent: 12 October 1998
- Commenced: 16 October 1998
- Administered by: Minister of Home Affairs

Amended by
- Local Government: Municipal Electoral Act, No. 27 of 2000
- Status: Amended

Electoral Amendment Act, Act 73 of 1998 in South Africa (taking effect 16 October 1998) to regulate elections of the National Assembly, the provincial legislatures and municipal councils; and to provide for related matters. The Act provides for the right of South African citizens to vote by registering, to be recorded on a voters roll, enabling them to vote at elections in their voting districts. It outlines the process in which voters choose parties during elections and that parties submit a list of candidates to fill seats won.

== Content of the Act ==
The following is a brief description of the sections of the Electoral Act:

=== Chapter 1 - Interpretation, Application and Administration ===
Section 1

Defines the meanings of certain common words used throughout the act.

Section 2

Defines how anyone should interpret the Act.

Section 3

Defines that the Act applies to elections in the National Assembly, provincial legislatures, municipalities, and by-elections.

Section 4

Defines that the Act is administered by the Electoral Commission.

=== Chapter 2 - Registration of Voters' and Voter' Roll ===
Section 5

Defines the need for a common voters roll administered by a Chief Electoral Officer.

Section 6

Defines that all South African citizens with an identity document may apply.

Section 7

Defines how a voter applies and their resident voting district.

Section 8

Defines that registration on the voters roll takes place when the Chief Electoral Officer is satisfied with the application and defines the conditions when they won't register a person.

Section 9

Defines how to change the registration details on a voters' roll when a person's voting district changes.

Section 10

Defines how to deregister a voter and their removal from the voters' roll.

Section 11

Define how amendments to voters’ roll are made by the chief electoral officer if they are not satisfied with the voter's details when incorrect or have changed or fail to meet the qualification rules.

Section 12

Defines how the chief electoral officer notifies a voter when an application to join the voters roll is refused or a change of name or residence is refused, when deregistered or when amendments to the roll are made by the officer themselves.

Section 13

Defines how voters' appeal against decisions and steps taken by the chief electoral officer in relation to sections 12 and sections 8, 9 and 11.

Section 14

Defines how the Electoral Commission conducts a general registration of voters, cut-off dates to enrol, notifications in terms of section 12 and appeals as set out in section 13. The ability to view one's registration and where and how to object to details on the roll as described in section 15. And finally publish the voters' roll on completion.

Section 15

Defines how a person makes objections to the voters roll of their name or others on the roll and how the Electoral Commission investigates the matter and the length of time they have to finalise the objection.

Section 16

Defines how, when and where the completed voters' roll is available for viewing and the ability to purchase the voters roll or an extract.

=== Chapter 3 - Proclamation of and Preparations for Elections ===
Part 1
Proclamation of elections
Section 17

Defines the proclamation of elections of National Assembly is by the President or Acting President with a single date and day stipulated with the electoral commission giving advice on the choice of day.

Section 18

Defines the proclamation of elections of provincial legislature is by the Premier or Acting Premier with a single date and day stipulated with the electoral commission giving advice on the choice of day.

Section 19

Defines the proclamation of municipal elections is subject to Chapter 7 of the Constitution and national or provincial legislation.

Section 20

Defines the creation of an election timetable, published in the Government Gazette and how it can be amended.

Section 21

Defines how a person can call for a general election to be postponed and then why and how the Electoral Commission would postpone it.

Section 22

Defines the procedures to postpone voting at a voting station prior to voting commencing and its notification.

Section 23

Defines the procedures to convene a revote at a voting station when ballot papers are lost, destroyed, or removed unlawfully before counting.

Part 2
Voters’ roll
Section 24

Defines what Voters' roll is used for an election and the date according to the election timetable it will be ready for viewing and whereabouts.

Section 25

Defines that section 24 does not apply to the voters’ roll for first elections of National Assembly and provincial legislatures and that the voters' roll is that one defined by section 5 and by the date referred to in section 14 (2) (h).

Part 3
Parties contesting election, and lists of candidates
Section 26

Defines the requirements for parties to contest election as one that is a registered party and has submitted a list of candidates defined in section 27.

Section 27

Defines the submission lists of candidates from a registered party as signed by the authorized party representative and binding all in that party to the Electoral Code of Conduct (CC), that candidates are qualified to stand, signed by the candidate to accept nomination and the code of conduct and a deposit. Defines the ability to set deposit amount by the Electoral Commission.

Section 28

Defines the procedure to occur if a candidate on the submission list does not comply and the ability to substitute or reorder the list by a set date.

Section 29

Defines the procedures to inspect the list of candidates and documents by means of a notice in the Government Gazette and media of where and when to view the lists or by a certified copy paid for by means of a fee.

Section 30

Defines that anyone or the electoral officer can object to a candidate on the list submitted on the grounds of qualification to stand, lack of nomination signature or signature binding them to the Election Code subject to the dates in the election timetable. Defines that the political party to be served notice at the same time. Defines by when the Commission decision must be reached and the right of appeal as set by timetable and the final decision by the Commission after the appeal. Defines section 27 and the right of the party to offer a substitute candidate.

Section 31

Defines the procedure of a final list of parties entitled to contest election and final lists of candidates as set by the election timetable, as well issue a certificate to each candidate stating they are registered in the election.

Part 4
Municipal councils
Section 32

Defines the ability of the Electoral Commission to make certain regulations listed concerning the elections of municipal councils subject to Chapter 7 of the South African Constitution.

Part 5
Special votes and declaration votes
Section 33

Defines the procedure for issuing of special votes for those unable to attend a voting station.

Section 34

Defines the procedure for issuing of declaration votes, the ability to vote in another voting area, for those unable to attend their own voting station.

=== Chapter 4 - Elections ===
Part 1
Voting
Section 35

Defines the staffing of a voting station as a presiding officer and voting officers.

Section 36

Defines the hours of voting are set by the Electoral Commission and defined in the voting timetable and can vary hours at different stations. Publish times in the media. Must be opened on time but can extend the voting closure times until midnight latest or temporary close a station during voting and reopen later in the day. Cannot vote after final closure but can vote if present in the station at time of closing for voting.

Section 37

Defines the procedures of the presiding officer prior to voting to show empty ballot boxes to party agents and then close and secure said boxes in their presence.

Section 38

Defines the voting procedure as, a voter can only vote once and in the voting district he is registered. Produce an identification document that is matched to the details on a voting roll and ensure they have not voted before. Presiding officer can take fingerprints of voter. Once satisfied, record the voter's presence to vote, mark the hand of the voter, mark back to validate and issue ballot paper to the voter. Defines that the voter has an empty voting compartment, mark his choices on his voting slip, fold the completed slip, show the mark of validation to a voting officer, and place the slip in the ballot box and then leave the voting station.

Section 39

Defines the assistance that can be given to certain voters who unable to read as either assistance by an accredited observer and two agents of two different parties or a person assisting the voter subject to the voter having a physical disability, has asked this person to help and is over eighteen.

Section 40

Defines the right to have a new voting slip issued if it has not been placed in the ballot box. The voting slip is returned to the voting office, marked cancelled, and filed and a new slip issued in accordance with the procedure in section 38 (5) and (6).

Section 41

Defines the procedure to object to a person voting. This can be made by a party agent concerning the right to vote or at that station. The voter or another agent can object to this objection and a decision is then made by the presiding officer. An appeal of the decision can be made to the Electoral Commission. All decisions are made as a written record.

Section 42

Defines how full ballot boxes are sealed by the presiding offer in the presence of party agents with their seals affixed. Same procedure applies to used boxes at the end of voting and remain sealed until counting in terms of section 46 (1) either at that station or at the place they are delivered too.

Section 43

Defines the recording on forms, the number of ballot boxes received versus amount used and not used and the same procedure for voting ballots received, used, and remaining in the presence of presiding officer and party agents. Seal unused boxes in their presence as well in separate containers, the marked voters rolls, unused ballot slips, cancelled ballot slips, written objections and decisions and sealed as to prior procedures. Defines procedures to transfer forms, boxes, and containers to the counting officer.

Section 44

Defines that sections 35 to 43 also apply to mobile voting stations.

Section 45

Defines that if more than one election is held at a voting station on the same day, sections 35 to 43 also apply to each election.

Part 2
Counting of votes at voting station
Section 46

Defines the place and time of the counting as usually at the voting station or at venue determined Electoral Commission and commence as soon as possible and uninterrupted until complete unless suspended and then all ballot papers and other documents kept safe by counting officer until resumption.

Section 47

Defines the counting of votes and the determination of a provisional result. The counting officer opens sealed ballot boxes. Organise the sorting of ballots into different elections if required, have the votes counted, recorded, and determine the result of the count. Reject ballot papers that identify the voter, vote for more than one party or candidate, no vote marked, unable to determine what was marked, no seal on back of ballot or is a counterfeit ballot paper. Counting officer must mark it rejected and filed separately or when disputed, mark so and count the result and then file separately.

Section 48

Defines the procedures to object to the sorting of ballot papers.

Section 49

Defines the procedures to object to the counting of ballot papers and provisional results and the procedure for recounting.

Section 50

Defines the procedure concerning the recording of provisional results and voting materials. Defines the forms required and what is recorded, how the results are announced and what happens to the ballot papers and other material afterwards.

Part 3
Counting of votes at place other than voting station
Section 51

Defines the procedures for counting of votes in section 46 (1) (a) or (b).

Section 52

Defines the verification procedure for examining and opening sealed ballot boxes by the counting officer and party agents.

Section 53

Defines the procedure for making objections to verification process before the counting of votes.

Section 54

Defines the application of certain sections in Part 2, sections 47 to 50, applying to the counting of votes and the determination of the result at a venue other than a voting station, objections and procedures concerning results and voting materials.

Part 4
Objections material to final results of election
Section 55

Defines the ability of one to object to final results of election and must be made by 21:00 on the second day after voting. All parties are notified of the objection and the Electoral Commission decision which can be appealed to the Electoral Court.

Section 56

Defines the power of the Electoral Commission and Electoral Court to decide in the case of an objection or appeal resulting from section 55 that votes from a station won't count or deducted from the overall count of a particular party.

Part 5
Determination and declaration official result of election
Section 57

Defines how the final election result is determined and declared as being no later than seven days after voting day and no sooner that 21:00 on the second day of voting or before objections have been dealt with though not in the cases of an appeal to the Electoral Court. An extension can be sought through the Electoral Court though a result can be declared prior to the receipt of all results if the delayed results would make no difference to the overall result.

=== Chapter 5 - Agents ===
Section 58

Defines that party agents may be appointed with two agents per party per voting station, a South African citizen and not a candidate.

Section 59

Defines the powers and duties of agents concerning voting, counting and the determination and declaration of election results. No agent must be present to validate the results. Defines the use of identification and that the agents are subject to orders issued by an electoral officer or security members acting for the former. Electoral Commission

=== Chapter 6 - Administration ===
Part 1
Voting districts
Section 60

Defines that voting districts be established throughout South Africa, boundaries set and mapped.

Section 61

Defines the factors for determining how voting district boundaries are established and whereabouts.

Section 62

Defines that the Electoral Commission may consulate with municipal party liaison committees concerning proposed boundaries.

Section 63

Defines that once boundaries have been established, that inspection and copies of maps of voting districts be made available by media, Government Gazette, physical inspection, and the ability to purchase copies.

Part 2
Voting stations
Section 64

Defines the procedure for the establishment of voting stations within the voting districts. This would mean a minimum of one station per voting district but list several factors to determine the final number and consult with municipal authorities. Locations would be published as part of the election timetable.

Section 65

Defines the procedure for relocating a voting station and the reasons why that could occur.

Section 66

Defines the procedure to organize voting stations and the boundaries for each one.

Section 67

Defines the procedures for organizing mobile voting stations which includes establishing routes, times, and publishing that prior to the election day.

Part 3
Voting materials
Section 68

Defines the Electoral Commission's procedures for the design, language choices, and security of ballot papers.

Section 69

Defines the Electoral Commission's procedures for the design of ballot boxes.

Section 70

Defines the Electoral Commission's procedures for the design of voting booths.

Section 71

Defines the Electoral Commission's procedures for the issuing of voting materials before opening a voting station via the chief electoral officer to the presiding officer and their responsibility to maintain the security of the materials.

Part 4
Appointment of officers, additional persons and institutions, and their powers and duties
Section 72

Defines the need to appoint presiding officers and their deputies for each voting station.

Section 73

Defines the powers and duties of presiding officers and deputies and includes who can be excluded from the voting station as well as power to exclude those who are included but whose behaviour does not contribute to a free and fair election.

Section 74

Defines the need to appoint voting officers to staff the voting stations.

Section 75

Defines the powers and duties of voting officers.

Section 76

Defines the need to appoint counting officers and their deputies for each voting station.

Section 77

Defines the powers and duties of counting officers and deputies for each voting station.

Section 78

Defines the need to appoint counters to staff the voting stations.

Section 79

Defines the powers and duties of counters.

Section 80

Defines the need to appoint additional persons for each voting station including institutions.

Section 81

Defines the powers and duties of additional persons.

Section 82

Defines the general provisions concerning appointment of officers.

Section 83

Defines the general provisions concerning appointment of institutions as per section 80.

Part 5
Accreditation of observers and persons providing voter education
Section 84

Defines the procedures for the accreditation of observers so that any juristic person to apply to observe an election and the requirements.

Section 85

Defines the powers and duties of accredited observers.

Section 86

Defines the procedure for accreditation of persons providing voter education

=== Chapter 7 - General Provisions ===
Part 1
Prohibited conduct
Section 87

Defines what undue influence is in relation to prohibited conduct.

Section 88

Defines what impersonation is in relation to prohibited conduct.

Section 89

Defines that no one in relation to the Act can make intentional false statements.

Section 90

Defines the voters right to secrecy of their vote and that to do otherwise is an infringement including opening or breaking the seal of a ballot box.

Section 91

Defines the prohibitions concerning the production of counterfeit voting material or damaging voting and election materials.

Section 92

Defines the prohibitions concerning placards and billboards during election.

Section 93

Defines what happens when obstruction of, or non-compliance with, directions of Commission, chief electoral officer, and other officers.

Section 94

Defines that parties or persons bound by the Electoral Code may not contravene the code.

Part 2
Enforcement
Section 95

Defines the ability to instituted and intervene in civil proceedings by chief electoral officer.

Section 96

Defines the jurisdiction and powers of Electoral Court.

Part 3
Offences and penalties
Section 97

Defines it's an offence for any person who contravenes a provision of Part 1 of this Chapter or a provision of section 107, 108 or 109.

Section 98

Defines the penalties for committing offences.

Part 4
Additional powers and duties of Commission
Section 99

Defines that political parties and their candidates must subscribe to the Electoral Code of Conduct and other Codes prior to the election by the former and by the latter on the candidate list as per section 31.

Section 100

Defines the Electoral Commission may make including fines and or periods of imprisonment.

Section 101

Defines the ability of the Electoral Commission to assignment of powers and duties to employees.

Section 102

Defines the ability of the Chief Electoral Officer to assignment of powers and duties to employees and officers.

Section 103

Defines the power of the Electoral Commission to decide objections and appeals.

Section 104

Access to private places.- Members, employees and officers of the Commission Defines power to have access to private places when that access is necessary for the exercise of a power or the performance of duty.

Section 105

Defines that the Electoral Commission owns all voting and election material and can dispose of them six months after the election.

Section 106

Defines that deposits are returned if a party obtains one seat other it is forfeited to the state.

Part 5
Other general provisions
Section 107

Defines that temporary obligation that apply from the time the election is called and until a result is obtained that printed election matter contain certain identifying requirements for the printer and publisher.

Section 108

Defines that certain political activities are prohibited on voting day.

Section 109

Defines the prohibition on publishing exit polls on election day.

Section 110

Defines that effect of certain irregularities on the voters roll in section 24 or on the final list of candidates in section 31 does not invalidate the two.

Section 111

Defines that the inspection and copying of documents should also be available by electronic means as well.

Section 112

Defines that strikes and lockouts are prohibited by telecommunications and public transport workers on voting day.

Section 113

Defines that there is a limitation of liability by the Electoral Commission, its employees and those appointed to work for them.

Section 114

Defines that the composition of National Assembly and provincial legislatures is defined in Schedule 3.

Section 115

Defines that the repeal of certain laws is included in Schedule 4.

Section 116

Defines that the Act binds State except for criminal liability.

Section 117

Defines that the application of Act when in conflict with other laws, except the constitution, this act prevails

Section 118

Defines the Acts short title and commencement date.

=== Schedule 1 ===
Election Timetable

Defines what is included on an Election Timetable.

=== Schedule 2 ===
Electoral Code of Conduct

Defines the Electoral Code of Conduct that each candidate for an election is to acknowledge and sign when nominating for the party list.

=== Schedule 3 ===
Composition of National Assembly and Provincial Legislatures

Defines the formula for determining the number of members in the assembly and legislature with a Commission to determine the numbers and the determination then published in the Government Gazette.

== Repeals ==
This Act repealed the following Acts, Electoral Act, Act No. 202 of 1993, Electoral Amendment Act, Act No. 1 of 1994 and Electoral Amendment Act, Act No. 20 of 1997.
