= Perseverance Tavern =

Public house in Cape Town

The Perseverance Tavern

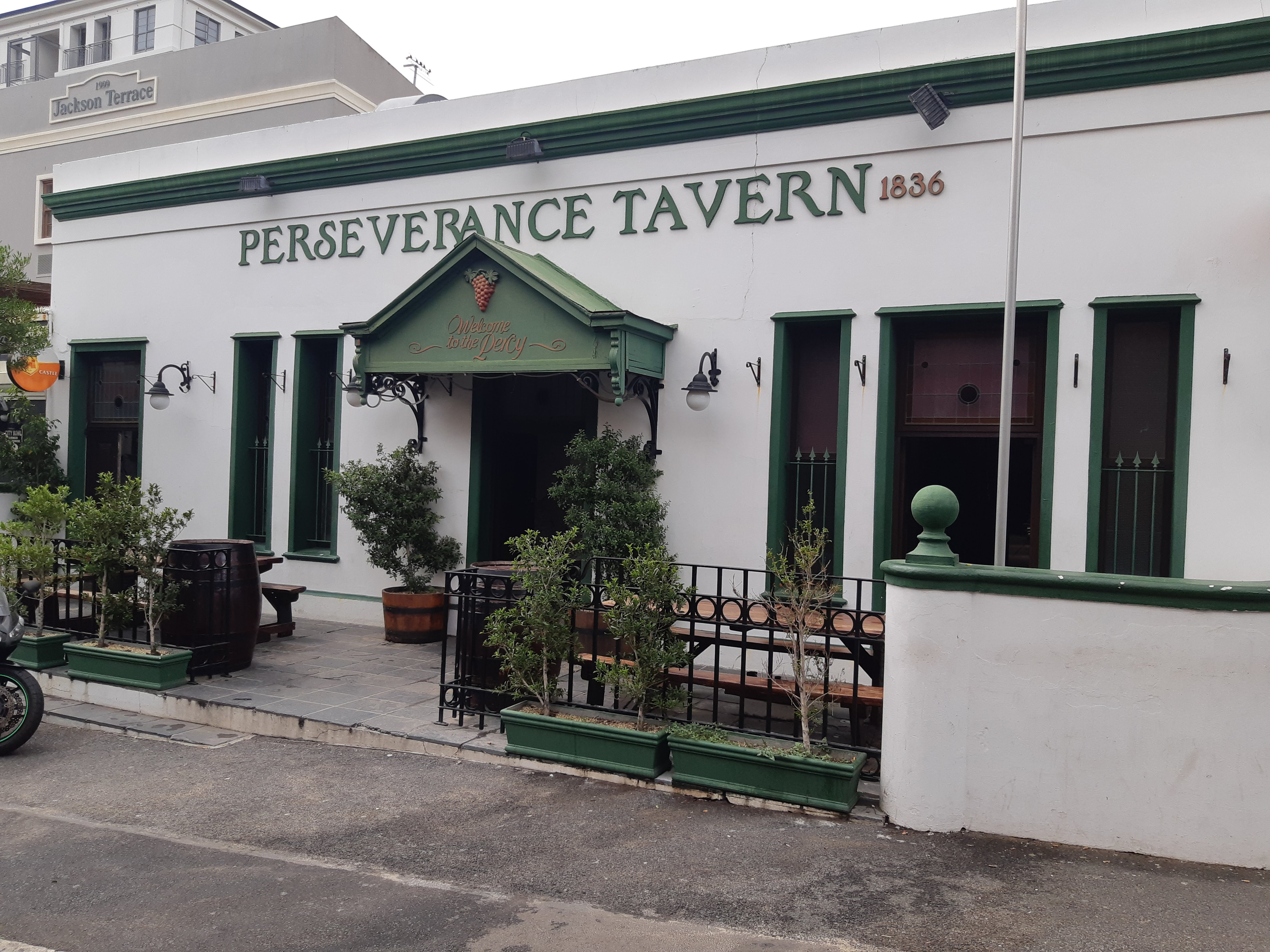
- The Perseverance Tavern in early March 2020, a few months before its closure.
- Alternative names: The Percy; Persies

General information
- Type: Public house
- Location: 83 Buitenkant Street; Cape Town City Bowl; Cape Town; 8001
- Coordinates: 33.930524°S 18.420900°E,
- Opened: 1808 (217–218 years old)

Technical details
- Floor count: 1

The Perseverance Tavern, also known as The Percy or Persies, is a public house established in 1808 by Johannes Blesser in Cape Town. At the time of its temporary closure due to the Covid-19 crisis, it was notable for being the oldest pub in South Africa. It was established during a period when Cape Town was a major port supporting sea going trade between Europe and Asia during which the city was known as "The Tavern of the Seas". The tavern was owned by Ohlsson’s Breweries for the first half of the 20th century until being sold in 1956.

It closed on 22 July 2020 due to the COVID-19 pandemic and resulting lockdown and alcohol sales ban. The tavern was re-opened under new ownership on 26 February 2021 following the easing of COVID-19 lockdown measures.
