= 1811 in South Africa =

- Decades: 1790s; 1800s; 1810s; 1820s; 1830s
- See also: List of years in South Africa

1811 in South Africa saw significant legal reforms, the outbreak of a major frontier war, and shifts in colonial administration.

== Incumbents ==
- Governor of the Cape of Good Hope:
  - Du Pre Alexander, 2nd Earl of Caledon (until 5 July)
  - Hon. Henry George Grey (acting, 5 July – 5 September)
  - Sir John Cradock (from 6 September)

== Events ==
=== Government and Law ===
- 16 May – The Earl of Caledon issues a proclamation to establish circuit courts in the Cape Colony. These courts, composed of two members from the Court of Justice, were designed to hear both civil and criminal cases in the outlying districts of Swellendam, George, Uitenhage, Graaff-Reinet, and Tulbagh. The system introduced public trials and the use of oral (viva voce) testimony for the first time at the Cape. According to legal historian H.J. Erasmus, this extended legal protection to Khoikhoi laborers and other "black employees". This led to the notable "Black Circuit" in 1812, where numerous charges were brought against white colonists on behalf of Khoikhoi servants.
- 6 September – Sir John Cradock is appointed Governor of the Cape, tasked with implementing a more aggressive policy on the colony's eastern frontier.
- 8 October – Governor Cradock appoints Lieutenant-Colonel John Graham as special commissioner for military and civil affairs in the eastern frontier districts.

=== Fourth Cape Frontier War ===
- December – The Fourth Cape Frontier War begins and lasts until March 1812. The conflict involved British colonial forces and the Xhosa people.
- 25 December – Lt-Col. John Graham commences his military campaign in the Zuurveld. His force consists of the Cape Regiment, numbering 594 men, and burgher commandos from the Swellendam, George, Uitenhage, and Graaff-Reinet districts. Graham had previously reformed the Cape Regiment, formerly known as the "Hottentot Corps," into a highly effective light infantry unit.
- Colonial forces employ scorched-earth tactics, destroying Xhosa gardens and seizing cattle, with the objective of expelling the Xhosa from the Zuurveld region. Within two months, an estimated 20,000 Xhosa were driven beyond the Fish River. The war concluded in March 1812, leading to the establishment of Graham's Town (now Makhanda) as a military headquarters.

=== Settlements and Infrastructure ===
- The Governor of the Cape orders that cast-iron pipes be laid in the principal streets of Cape Town, including Orange, Long and Strand Streets, to replace the existing wooden pipe system for the city's water supply.
- 23 April – The Earl of Caledon proclaims George as a new magisterial district, named in honour of the reigning British monarch, King George III.
- The Dutch Reformed congregation in Caledon is established, making it the eighth oldest congregation of the Dutch Reformed Church in South Africa.

== Deaths ==
- 3 August – Sebastiaan Cornelis Nederburgh, Dutch statesman and former Commissioner-General for the Dutch East India Company at the Cape (1792–1793), dies in the Netherlands. (b. 1762)
