= 1807 in South Africa =

- Decades: 1780s; 1790s; 1800s; 1810s; 1820s
- See also: List of years in South Africa

The following lists events that happened during 1807 in South Africa.

== Events ==
- British ban slave trade and the importation of slaves to the Cape ends.
- 17 January - Henry George Grey is appointed as acting Governor of the Cape.
- 22 May - Du Pré Alexander, 2nd Earl of Caledon, is appointed Governor of the Cape.
