= Slachter's Nek Rebellion =

1815 Boer uprising east of Cape Colony

| Date | October – November 1815 |
| Location | Cape Colony |
| Result | Colonial government victory: Rebellion suppressed; Ringleaders executed; Rise of Afrikaner nationalism |

Belligerents
| Boer rebels | Cape Colony |

Commanders and leaders
| Johannes Bezuidenhout † | (United Kingdom) Jacob Cuyler |

Strength
| 200 | 40 troops 30 loyalist Boers |

Casualties and losses
| 1 killed 5 executed | None |

The Slachter's Nek Rebellion (Note: Slachter's Nek is the Dutch spelling. In Afrikaans the spelling is Slagtersnek. In both languages, the name translates to Butcher's Neck (Nek is used in several Afrikaans place names).) was an uprising against the British colonial government by Boers in 1815 on the eastern border of the Cape Colony.

== Background ==
In 1815, a farmer from the eastern border of the Cape Colony, Frederik Bezuidenhout was summoned to appear before a court after being accused of abusing one of his Khoi labourers and refusing to pay him. After refusing to show up, he was sentenced to one month in jail for contempt of court and an order for his arrest was issued. Upon being confronted, Bezuidenhout resisted arrest and fled to a cave near his home, where he fought the Khoikhoi soldiers sent to capture him. After refusing to surrender, he was shot and killed by one of the soldiers.

At Bezuidenhout's funeral, his outraged brother, Johannes Jurgen (Hans Jan) Bezuidenhout, swore to take revenge on the officials whom he held responsible for his brother's death. He urged local Boers to rebel against the colonial government, wanting to chase the British and the Khoikhoi into the sea and establish an independent state on the eastern frontier.

== Uprising ==
Hendrik Prinsloo, along with Hans Bezuidenhout organised a 200-man uprising against the British colonial authority, which was believed, by the Boers (Afrikaner farmers) to be hostile towards themselves and to favour Blacks and Coloureds above the Afrikaner farmers. The Boers also had more than 3,600 cattle stolen and felt the British were not doing enough to protect them from the attacks by the Xhosa. On 18 November, a commando of 60 rebels met an armed force of 40 soldiers sent by Colonel Jacob Cuyler, the military commander and Landdrost (magistrate) on the eastern borders, supported by 30 loyalist Boers led by Willem Nel, at Slachter's Nek.

Negotiations failed, and the majority of the rebels left without any shots being fired. Twenty rebels surrendered, followed by several more over the following few days. However, some of the leaders, among whom was Hans Bezuidenhout, refused to turn themselves over to the authorities. On 29 November, they were attacked by colonial troops. Everybody but Bezuidenhout and his family surrendered, and like his brother, Hans died while resisting arrest.

== Aftermath ==
47 of the rebels were tried at Uitenhage.

Names of accused

- Hendrik Frederik Prinsloo (Note: The surname Prinslo is in fact spelt as Prinsloo.)
- Nicolaas Balthazar Prinsloo, Mart^{s}-son
- Willem Jacobus Prinsloo, W^{m}-son
- Nicolaas Prinsloo, W^{m}-son
- Willem Prinsloo, N^{s}-son
- Johannes Prinsloo, M.son
- Theunis Christiaan de Klerk
- Willem Krugel
- Hendrik van der Nes
- Cornelis van der Nes
- Stoffel Rudolph Botha
- Willem Adriaan Nel
- Thomas Andries Dreyer
- Johannes Bronkhorst
- Hendrik Petrus Klopper
- Jacobus Klopper
- Petrus Laurens Erasmus
- Joachim Johaunes Prinslo
- Johannes Frederik Botha
- Hendrik Frederik Prinsloo
- Nicolaas Balthazar Prinsloo (He took part in the Great Trek and was murdered with the van Rensburg trek party at Djindispruit, Limpopo River, Mozambique at the end of July 1836.)

39 rebels were found guilty, with 32 being ordered and six were sentenced to death. Most of them were subsequently pardoned by the Governor, leaving only eight to be banished and five to be executed. On 9 March 1816, the remaining five were hanged in public at Van Aardtspos. Four of the nooses broke during the procedure and the still living convicts, together with several spectators present, pleaded for their lives. However, they were ordered to be hanged a second time. Sixteen of the convicts were present at the executions. The rebellion and the consequent executions of the rebels have acquired special significance among contemporary South African historians as the beginning of an Afrikaner struggle against British rule.
