= State President of the Orange Free State =

Head of state

- Staatspresident van de Oranje Vrijstaat
- Arms of the Orange Free State

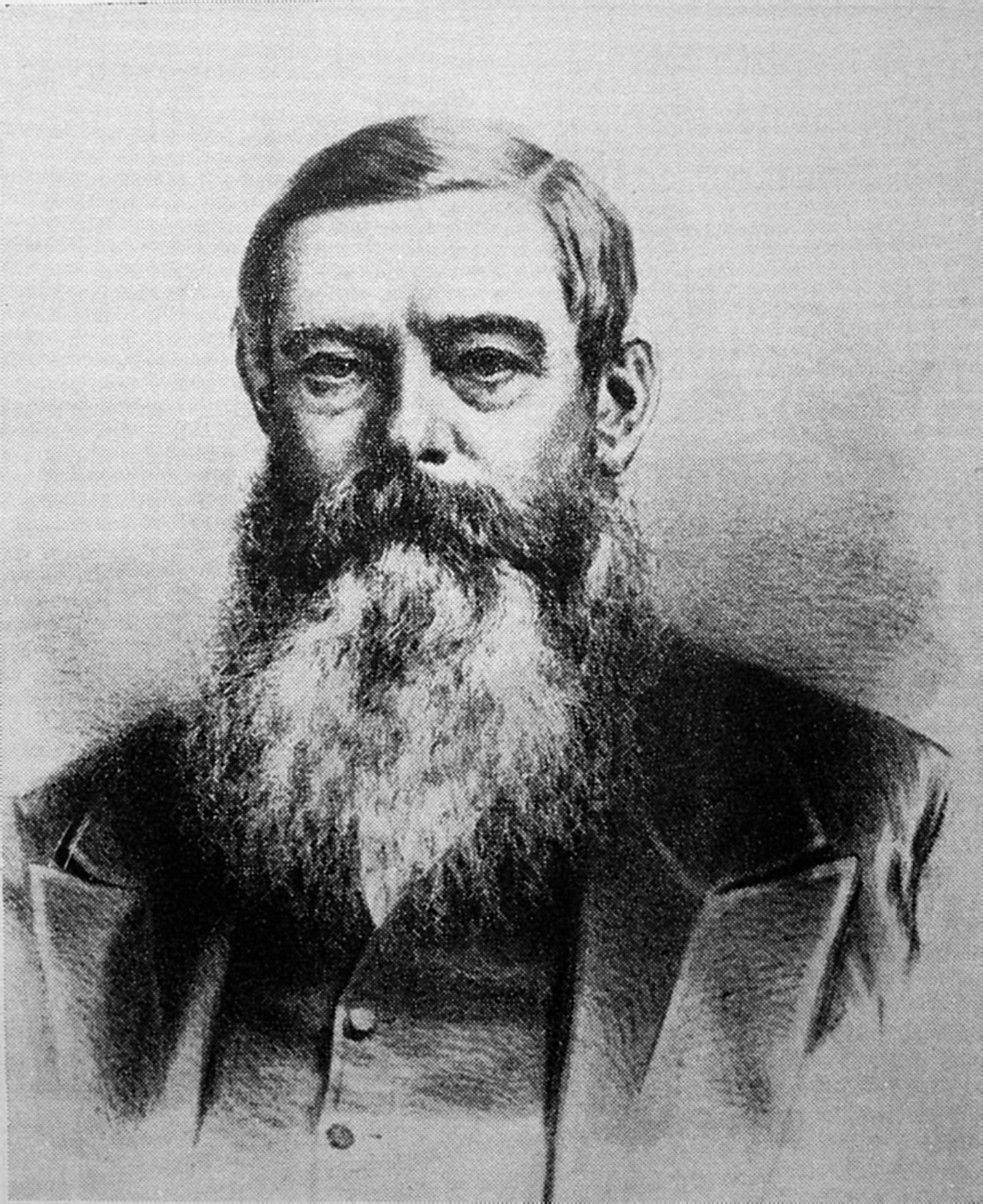
- Longest serving Johannes Brand; 2 February 1864–14 July 1888
- Style: His Excellency
- Residence: Old Presidency, Bloemfontein
- Term length: 5 years, renewable
- Formation: 13 September 1854
- First holder: Josias Philip Hoffman
- Final holder: Martinus Theunis Steyn
- Abolished: 31 May 1902

The state president of the Orange Free State had the executive authority in the Orange Free State. By the constitution of 1854, the president was elected by the Burghers, from a list of candidates nominated by the Volksraad for a term of five years. There was no limit on the number of re-elections.

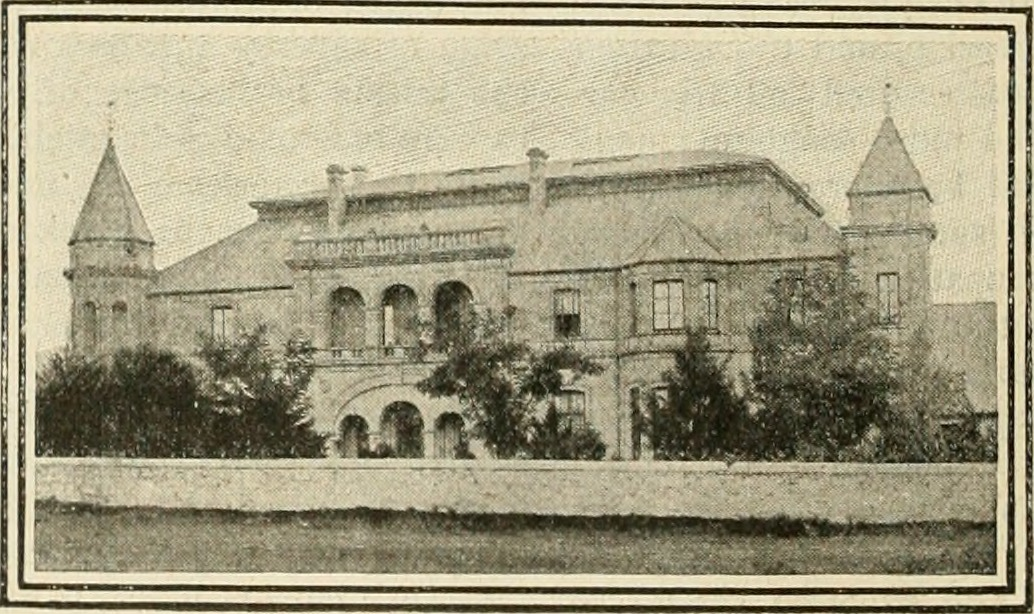
The Old Presidency in Bloemfontein

== List of officeholders ==
No.	Portrait	Name (Birth–Death)	Term of office		
No.	Portrait	Name (Birth–Death)	Took office	Left office	Time in office
1		Josias Philip Hoffman (1807–1879) (Note: Styled as President of the Provisional Government (until 29 March 1854), President of the Volksraad (until 15 April 1854), Acting State President (until 13 September 1854) and State President (from 13 September 1854).)	24 February 1854	10 February 1855	351 days
–		Jacobus Johannes Venter (1814–1889) (Note: Styled as Provisional State President (until 15 February 1855) and Chairman of the Executive Committee (from 15 February 1855).)	10 February 1855	27 August 1855	198 days
2		Jacobus Nicolaas Boshoff (1808–1881)	27 August 1855	6 September 1859	4 years, 10 days
–		Esaias Reynier Snijman (1822–1884); Acting	6 September 1859	8 February 1860	155 days
3		Marthinus Wessel Pretorius (1819–1901)	8 February 1860	17 June 1863	3 years, 159 days
–		Joseph Allison; Acting for absent Pretorius	18 March 1863	17 June 1863	91 days
Vacant (17 June – 20 June 1863) (Note: The office of State President was vacant between 17 June 1863 when the Volksraad accepted the resignation of Pretorius and 20 June 1863 when Venter was sworn in.)
–		Jacobus Johannes Venter (1814–1889); Acting	20 June 1863	2 February 1864	227 days
4		Sir Johannes Henricus Brand, GCMG (1823–1888)	2 February 1864	14 July 1888 ^{†}	24 years, 163 days
–		Pieter Jeremias Blignaut (1841–1909) (Note: Styled as Chairman of the Executive Council (until 21 August 1888) and Acting State President (from 21 August 1888).)	14 July 1888	10 January 1889	180 days
5		Francis William Reitz (1844–1934)	10 January 1889	11 December 1895	6 years, 335 days
–		Pieter Jeremias Blignaut (1841–1909); Acting	11 December 1895	4 March 1896	84 days
6		Martinus Theunis Steyn (1857–1916)	4 March 1896	31 May 1902	6 years, 88 days
Second Boer War (11 October 1899 – 31 May 1902)
–		Christiaan Rudolf de Wet (1854–1922); Acting for Steyn	29 May 1902	31 May 1902	2 days
Post abolished with the Treaty of Vereeniging; British annexation (Orange River Colony)

== Last election ==
Candidate	Votes	%
Martinus Theunis Steyn	6,877	83.42
John G. Fraser	1,367	16.58
Total	8,244	100.00
Source: South African History Online

== See also ==
- State President of the South African Republic

== Sources ==
- Theal, George McCall (1908). History of South Africa since September 1795. Vol. 4. Cambridge University Press. doi:10.1017/CBO9780511783241. ISBN 9780511783241.
