= Old Presidency =

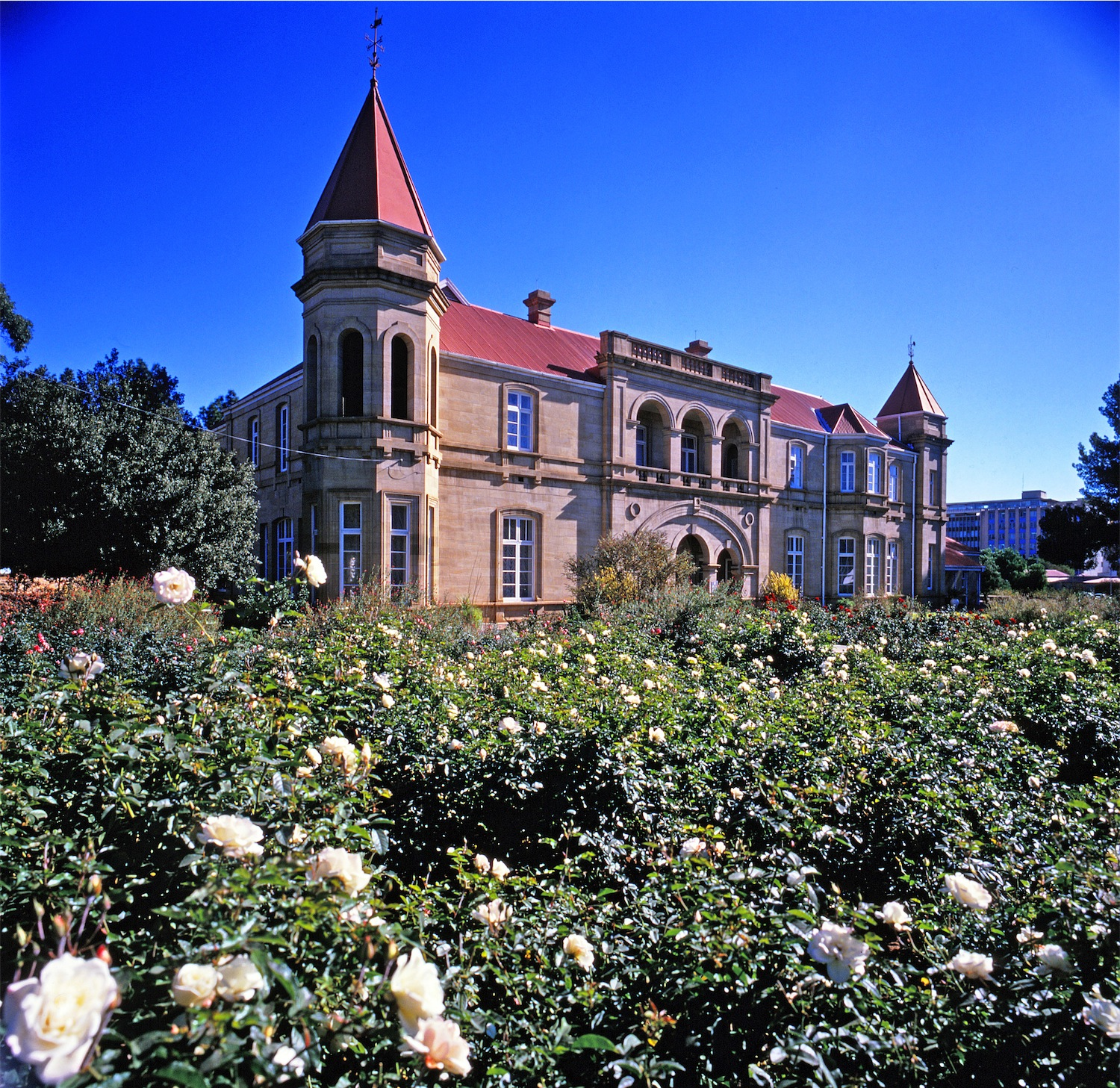
- Location: Bloemfontein, Free State Province, South Africa
- Coordinates: 29.1196°S 26.2155°E
- Type: Military museum
- Visitors: Monday to Friday 08:00 – 16:00

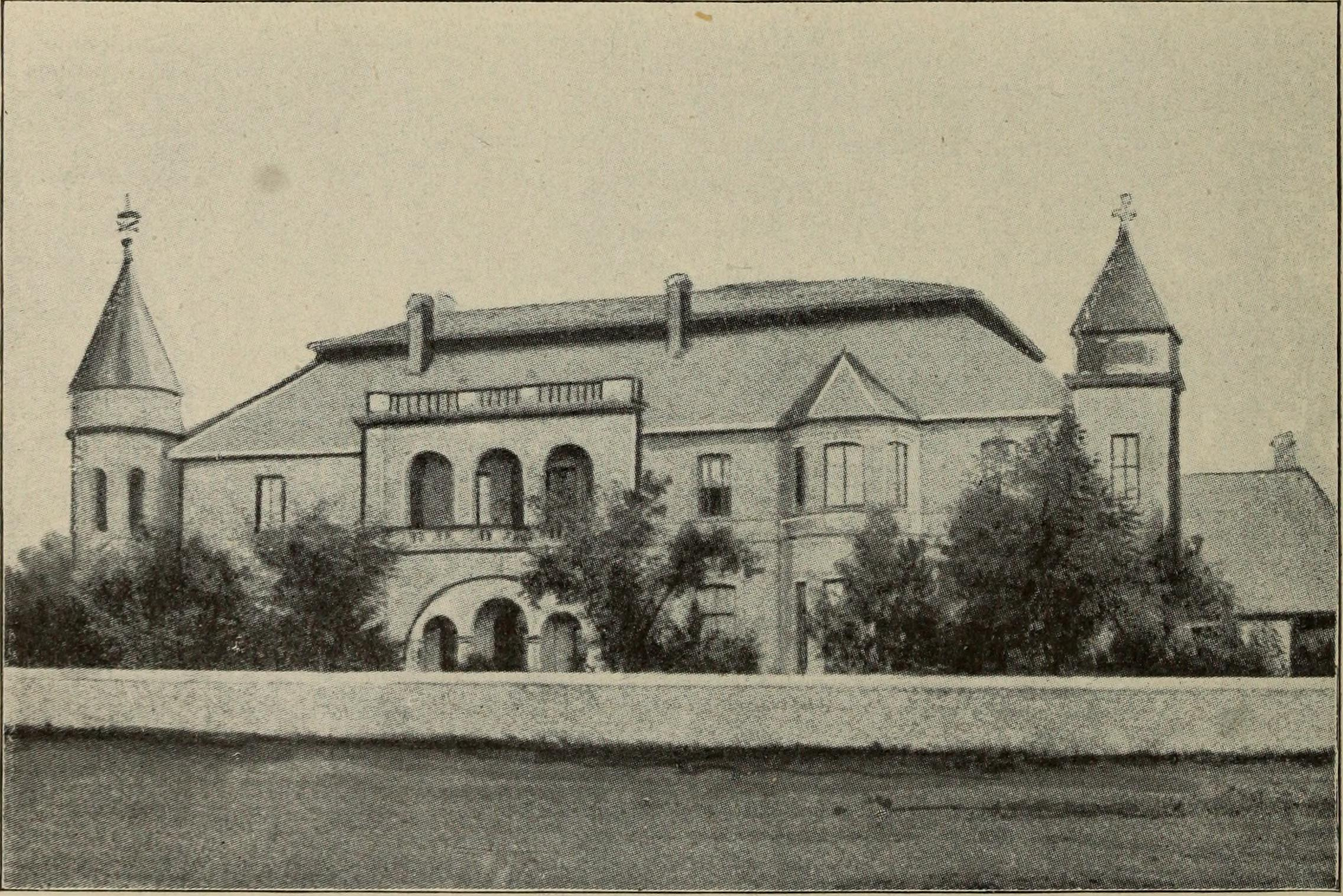
The Presidency at Bloemfontein

The Old Presidency or Ou Presidensie (Afrikaans) is a museum, art gallery and theatre in the city of Bloemfontein, South Africa, located on President Brand Street in the heart of the city. The former residence of the President of the Republic of the Orange Free State from 1886 until 1899 when the city fell to the British Empire during the Second Anglo-Boer War.

== History ==
A trekboer family with the surname of Brits settled on the site in the 1820s and built a thatched A-frame dwelling for themselves. Major Henry Douglas Warden (then the British resident for the area north of the Orange River) purchased it from the Brits family in 1846. The thatched-house built by the Brits family was demolished and the house he (Warden) erected began as a small farm building which was made out of sun-dried bricks. It is referred to as a 'nederige kleihuis' (Afrikaans for humble clay-house). In 1854, The British Government abandoned the Orange River Sovereignty and the Boer Republic then took over the residence. This independence saw the new presidents of the republic take up quarters in the "Residency", reportedly Presidents Josias Philip Hoffman, Jacobus Nicolaas Boshoff and Marthinus Wessel Pretorius. They all lived in the dwelling during their terms in office. In 1860, the Volksraad (The parliament of the former Orange Free State Republic, which existed from 1857 to 1902) approved plans for a new Presidency house. At that time, the Volksraad could only afford £800 for the restoration of the old residency. Additional repairs were carried out in 1864 and 1874.

In the early 1880s the Volksraad decided that the cost of maintenance was unfeasible and that the building was no longer suitable as the official residence of the head of state of an independent country. Thus in 1882 President Johannes Brand submitted plans for a competition to design the 'new' Presidency to the Volksraad. There were in total 27 proposals submitted in 1884 for the prize money of £100. An international architectural competition was held and won by English architects – Lennox Canning and F Goad of Canning & Goad Architects. The construction of the building was budgeted at £10,000, but the design submitted by Canning was too sophisticated and even after being asked to simplify their design, it still amounted to £12, 200. With some reluctance, this was accepted. The excavation of new foundations for the new building was deemed too costly, subsequently it was decided to build the new building on the foundation of the old one. .

Construction started on 22 May 1885, when the foundation stone was laid, and the building was completed in 1886 with President Brand taking up quarters until his death in 1888. Presidents F.W. Reitz (1888–95) and M.T. Steyn (1896-1900) also resided in the building until the British occupation of Bloemfontein on 13 March 1900 when the building served as the headquarters of Field-Marshal Lord Roberts during the Second Anglo-Boer War.

== Other uses of the Presidency ==
After the British captured Bloemfontein on 13 March 1900, the building became known as the Government House and was occupied by Lord Roberts and his officers; and later by Sir Hamilton J Goold-Adams (1901-1910) who was the Lieutenant-Governor of the Orange River Colony. During the time of Goold-Adams, the architect Sir Herbert Baker made some additions to the Presidency and also added the stables to the back of the house. Along the years, the Presidency served as the following:

- Annexe for Eunice School
- Headquarters for the Orange Free State Command
- Hostel for Normal College students
- Offices for Free State Library Services
- Venue for Performing Arts Centre of the Free State (PACOFS)

== Haunting ==
The stables at the back of the building are thought to be haunted with several reports of people hearing carriages moving into the stables. The premises reportedly house the ghost of a dog with many people hearing ephemeral barking at night. There are also many stories of children being spotted within the building due to the buildings tenure as a school and hostel.

== Declaration status and Museum ==
The building was restored from 1973 to 1983. The museum mainly focuses on the lives and history of the three heads of state (Brand, Reitz and Steyn) during their respective terms of office. This site was originally declared a national monument on 27 January 1938 and later revised 15 December 1989 to the following:

- SiteReference: 9/2/302/0007
- DeclarationType: Provincial Heritage Site
- GazetteNo: 12214
- Gazette Date: Friday, December 15, 1989
- NoticeNo: 2709.Notice
- Date: Friday, December 15, 1989.
- Description The property, together with the Old Presidency thereon situated in President Brand Street, Bloemfontein, being certain Consolidated Erf 24722, situated in the city of Bloemfontein, District of Bloemfontein, in extent 3, 0586 hectares.

The museum has other attractions including "art exhibitions, musical events and theatrical productions" and the gardens outside prove to be a popular site for photography. The museum is open during the week.

== See also ==
- Bloemfontein
- List of heritage sites in Free State
- List of reportedly haunted locations
- List of Castles and Fortifications in South Africa
