= Jacobus Johannes Venter =

South African (Boer) statesman

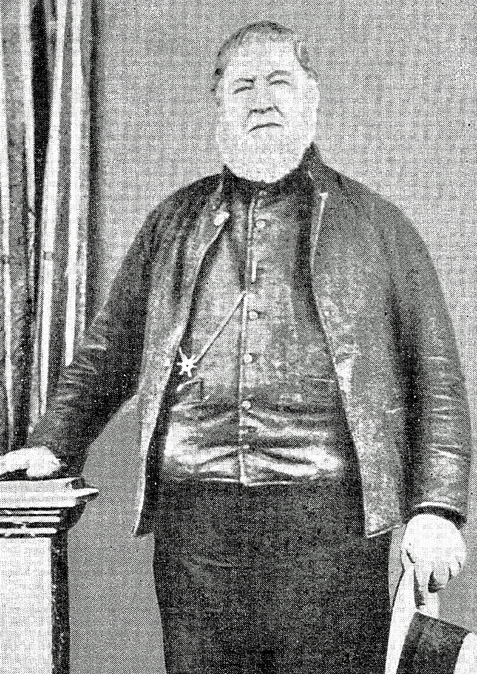
- Picture of JJ Koos Venter

Chairman of the Joint Commission for Administering the Government of the Orange Free State
- In office 10 February 1855 – 27 August 1855
- Preceded by: Josias Philip Hoffman; As State President of the Orange Free State
- Succeeded by: Jacobus Nicolaas Boshoff; As State President of the Orange Free State

Acting State President of the Orange Free State
- In office 15 December 1859 – 8 February 1860
- Preceded by: Esaias Reynier Snijman (Acting)
- Succeeded by: Marthinus Wessel Pretorius
- In office 20 June 1863 – 2 February 1864
- Preceded by: Joseph Allison (Acting)
- Succeeded by: Johannes Brand

Member of the Volksraad of the Orange Free State

Personal details
- Born: 21 March 1814
- Died: 18 January 1889 (aged 74) Bloemfontein; Orange Free State

Jacobus Johannes Venter (1814–1889) was a South African (Boer) statesman. He was a member of the Volksraad of the Orange Free State, chairman of the Joint Commission for Administering the Government in 1855 and served as Acting State President in 1859 – 1860 and again in 1863 – 1864.

Five towns in South Africa were named after the Venter clan: Ventersdorp, Venterstad, Venterspos, Ventersburg and Ventershoop.
