= 1896 Orange Free State presidential election =

- February 1896
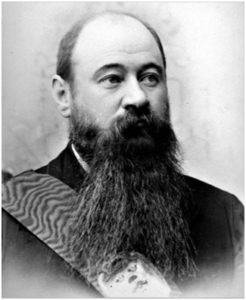

Nominee	Martinus Theunis Steyn	John G. Fraser
Popular vote	6,877	1,367
Percentage	83.42%	16.58%
President before election
Pieter Jeremias Blignaut
(Acting)
Elected President
Martinus Theunis Steyn

Presidential elections were held in the Orange Free State in February 1896. They were held after the former President Francis William Reitz resigned due to bad health in 1895. The two candidates were High Court judge Martinus Theunis Steyn and John G. Fraser. Whilst Steyn supported the proposed merger of the Orange Free State and Transvaal, Fraser was in favour of closer links with the neighbouring Cape Colony and the United Kingdom.

The election resulted in a convincing win for Steyn, who received 83% of the vote. He was inaugurated as president on 4 March 1896 at the Dutch Reformed Church in Bloemfontein.

== Results ==
Candidate	Votes	%
Martinus Theunis Steyn	6,877	83.42
John G. Fraser	1,367	16.58
Total	8,244	100.00
Source: South African History Online
