= Esaias Reynier Snijman =

South African (Boer) politician and statesman

Member of the Joint Commission for Administering the Government of the Orange Free State
- In office 10 February 1855 – 27 August 1855
- Preceded by: New office
- Succeeded by: Office abolished

Acting President of the Orange Free State
- In office 6 September 1859 – 15 December 1859
- Preceded by: J.N. Boshoff
- Succeeded by: J.J. Venter (act.)

Chairman of the Volksraad of the Orange Free State

Member of the Volksraad of the Orange Free State

Personal details
- Born: November 6, 1822 Colesburg, Cape Colony
- Died: July 14, 1884 (aged 61) Philippolis, Orange Free State
- Spouse: Magdalena Johanna Snijman
- Occupation: Politician

Esaias Reynier Snijman (1822-1884) was a South African (Boer) politician and statesman. He was a member and chairman (1858) of the Volksraad of the Orange Free State, member of the Joint Commission for Administering the Government of the Orange Free State in 1855 and served as Acting State President in 1859.
