= Joseph Allison (South African politician) =

South African politician

Joseph Allison ( Cork, 17 November 1817 – Tempe, Bloemfontein, 5 September 1869 ) was a South African politician, born in the Cape Colony. In 1851 he was clerk to the British Resident and the Legislative Council of the Orange River Sovereignty. After the territory gained independence as Orange Free State Allison became a member of the Volksraad, government secretary (1862 – 1863) and treasurer, and briefly Acting State President of the Orange Free State in 1863, after President Pretorius had left the State. Allison had strong British sympathies.
