= Cornelius Hermanus Wessels =

South African farmer, statesman, and diplomat

Sir Cornelius Hermanus Wessels
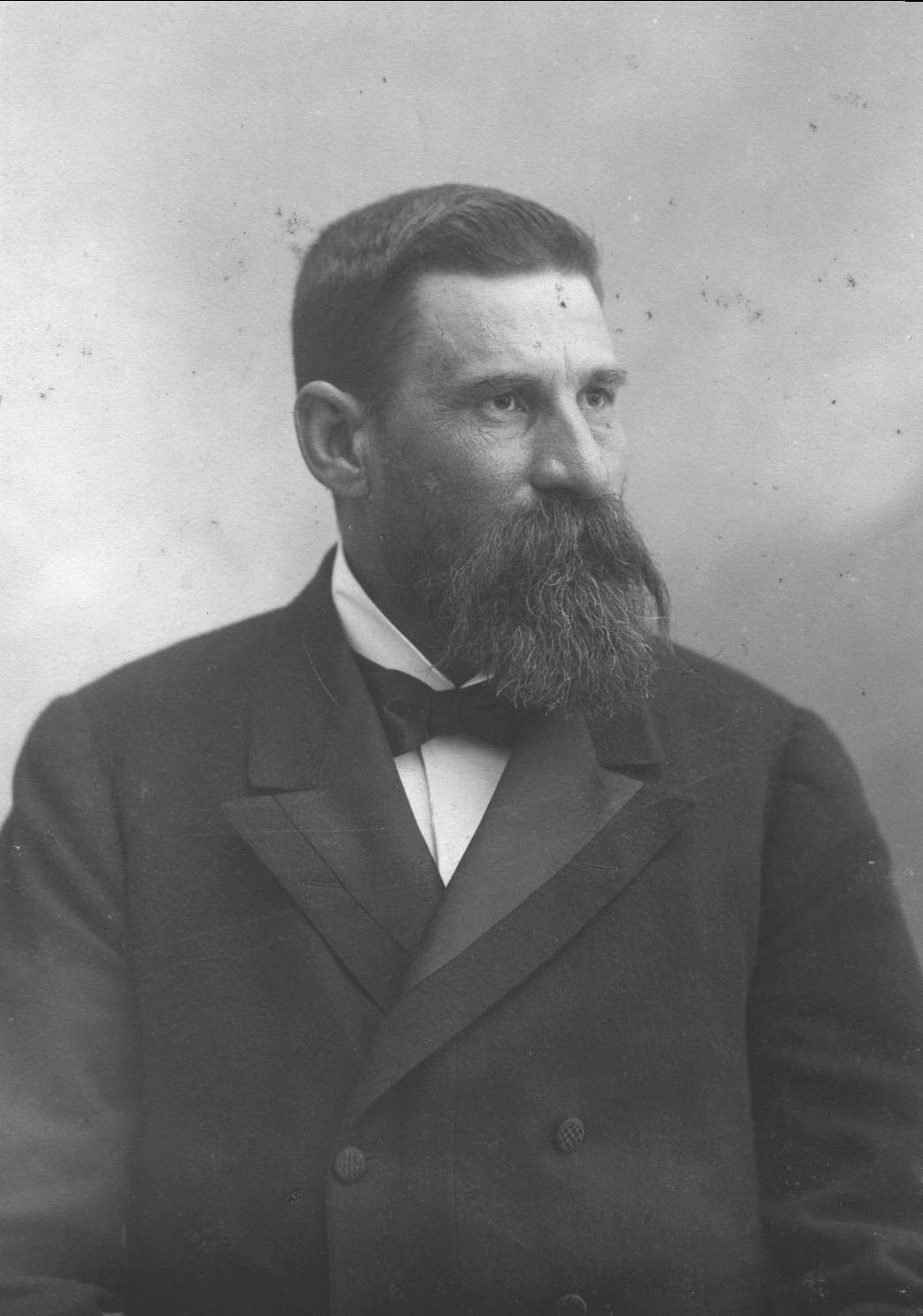

Member of the Volksraad of the Orange Free State
- In office 1885 – October 1899

Member of the Executive Council of the Orange Free State
- In office 1894–1896

Vice President of the Volksraad of the Orange Free State
- In office 1896–1897

President of the Volksraad of the Orange Free State
- In office 1897–1899
- Preceded by: Christiaan Willem Hendrik Van Der Post

Member of the War Cabinet of the Orange Free State
- In office 1899–1900

Member of the Diplomatic Delegation of the Boer Republics to Europe and America
- In office 1900–1902

Minister for Mines, Lands, and Public Works of the Orange Free State
- In office 1907–1914
- Preceded by: New office
- Succeeded by: Unknown

Administrator of the Orange Free State
- In office 1915–1924
- Preceded by: A.E.W. Ramsbottom
- Succeeded by: E.R. Grobler

Personal details
- Born: 26 April 1851 Rietfontein, Winburg, Orange River Sovereignty
- Died: 1 March 1924 (aged 72) Bloemfontein, Orange Free State, Union of South Africa
- Party: Orangia Unie, South African Party
- Profession: Farmer, Politician

Sir Cornelius Hermanus Wessels (26 April 1851 Rietfontein, Winburg, Orange River Sovereignty – 1 March 1924 Bloemfontein, Orange Free State, Union of South Africa) was a South African statesman.

Wessels stemmed from an important Orange Free State family clan, dedicated to farming and the Boer way of life. Mainly self-educated, he turned to politics in his early thirties. As a member of the Volksraad he developed his skills as a diplomat and mediator, and was involved in many of the important political decisions the Orange Free State had to make in the 1880s and 1890s. In 1897 he was appointed president of the Volksraad.

During the South African War (1899–1902), Wessels was first a member of the war cabinet, and later a member of the Joint Diplomatic Delegation of the Boer Republics sent to Europe and the United States to muster support for the Boer cause. After the war Wessels sided with De Wet and Hertzog and became a cabinet minister in the Free State government. In 1915, the colonial government appointed Wessels as administrator of the Orange Free State. He was awarded a knighthood for his services to the state in the 1920 New Year Honours.

== Family ==
Wessels was the youngest son of three boys and two girls born to Johannes Jacobus Wessels and Hester Sophia Antonetta (née) Wessels.

Wessels married twice. His first wife was Christina Magdalena (née) Wessels (d. 5 November 1905), with whom he had five sons and three daughters. He remarried in 1907 with Eliza Alice Bosman née Keytler (d. 6 March 1941), a widow.

== Life and career ==
Wessels grew up in the Boshof District in the Orange Free State, where his parents moved when he was five years old. Here he received some private tuition, before – still at a young age – becoming a full-time and successful farmer. In 1892, he bought the farm Kwagafontein just outside Bloemfontein.

Wessels life was marked by two activities: farming and politics, and in both he was mainly self-educated. In 1885, at age thirty-four, Wessels was elected to the Volksraad (the Free State parliament) for the Modderrivier area of Boshof. He was to represent this constituency for fourteen years, until the outbreak of the South African War in 1899. Wessels was a natural leader, and this was the main reason for his continued election to office. However, being a member of the influential and large Wessels clan helped.

Wessels' political influence showed itself in him being appointed to several important positions regarding the discussions between the Orange Free State and the South African Republic about closer co-operation between the two Boer states. From 1897, he represented the Orange Free State in the Council of Representatives that monitored the co-operation.

In the 1880s, Wessels was also a leading figure in the discussions about the extension of the railway network of the Orange Free State and the direct connections with the Cape Colony and the South African Republic. The same holds true for the efforts to forge a South African customs union in the 1890s. Wessels was a very practical man and was qualified by the British as the 'business brain' in the Orange Free State government. For several years, he was a director of the National Bank of the Orange Free State.

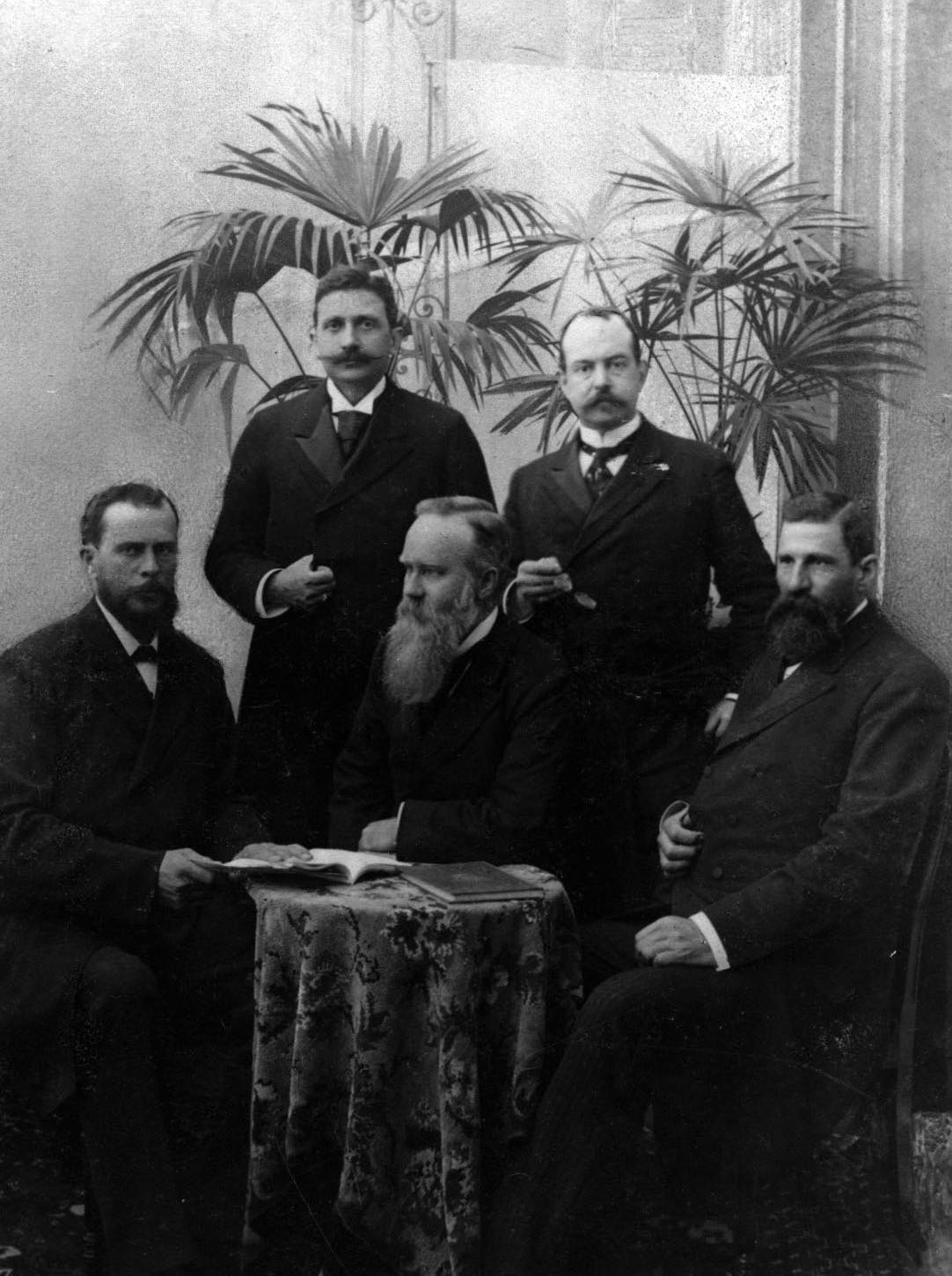
Special Diplomatic Delegation of the Boer Republics to Europe and America, 1900, l.t.r. front: A.D.W. Wolmarans, A. Fischer, C.H. Wessels, and back: Dr. W.J. Leyds and Dr. H.P.N. Muller

Wessels' political acumen brought him high office, from 1894 to 1896 as representative of the Volksraad in the Executive Council, and eventually as vice-president (1896–1897) and president (1897–1899) of the Volksraad. In this position, Wessels' diplomatic skills and strict impartiality acquired him great respect. During the South African War, Wessels was recruited by President Steyn as a member of his war cabinet, the 'Krijgscommissie' (War Commission). When the war progressed and the Boer republics were looking for support from European states and the United States, the governments of the Boer republics appointed a special diplomatic delegation. It consisted of A. Fischer as chairman and for the Orange Free State, A.D.W. Wolmarans and Wessels as members for the South African Republic and the Orange Free State respectively. In Europe, the deputation met up with W.J. Leyds, ambassador for the South African Republic in Brussels and H.P.N. Muller, consul general and special envoy of the Orange Free State in The Netherlands. The encounter with Muller was a renewal of friendly relations between the two men, who first met in Bloemfontein in 1898, and again in May 1899 in The Hague, when Wessels brought a private visit to the Netherlands. The delegation's mission to Europe failed, and was caught out by history in the United States. After the conclusion of the Treaty of Vereeniging Wessels and the other member of the delegation returned to South Africa.

After his return to the Orange River Colony, he refused to take part in the British colonial administration, but he did use his diplomatic skills to promote mutual understanding between the Afrikaner citizens and the British government. With the return of responsible government, Wessels re-entered the political arena. Together with J.B.M Hertzog, C.R. de Wet and A. Fischer he founded a new political party, the Orangia Unie and he became the director of the party newspaper The Friend. The elections of June 1907 brought the Orangia Unie a landslide election victory. Wessels was elected to the Assembly for the Bloemfontein-South constituency, and took up the appointment of Minister for Mines, Lands, and Public Works in the new government, led by A. Fischer.

Afrikaner politics were complicated in the new colonial province, and Wessels fell out with Hertzog about agricultural affairs, the appointment of English-speaking officials in his department, and because of temperamental differences. After the formation of the Union of South Africa, Wessels aligned himself with the South African Party of Louis Botha. During and after the Rebellion of 1914, Wessels stayed true to his political convictions and reconciliatory attitude towards the British. He did not shift his allegiance to the National Party like most of his Orange Free State colleagues, and this cost him the parliamentary election of 1914.

In June 1915, the British government appointed Wessels administrator of the Orange Free State, seeing him as a loyal ally. The job was not an easy one and asked all of Wessels' diplomatic skills. As a British appointee and a member of the South African Party, he initially ran into considerable opposition and enmity from both the Executive Committee and the Provincial Council, of which most of the members supported the National Party. Nevertheless, Wessels succeeded in making his administration a success, and in 1919, the Union government proposed him for a knighthood, which he received in the 1920 New Year Honours.

In November 1923, aged 72, Wessels suffered a stroke, and although he recovered almost fully, a second stroke hit him on 15 February 1924, and he died as a result two weeks later.

== Legacy ==
Financially Wessels was independent, due to his fortuitous farming activities. In character he was modest, courteous to others, interested in people, and a good story-teller. Altogether these traits accounted for his natural aptitude for diplomacy and his long and successful political career, although it did not make him a visionary statesman.
