= Dutch Reformed Church, Bloemfontein =

Church in Bloemfontein, South Africa

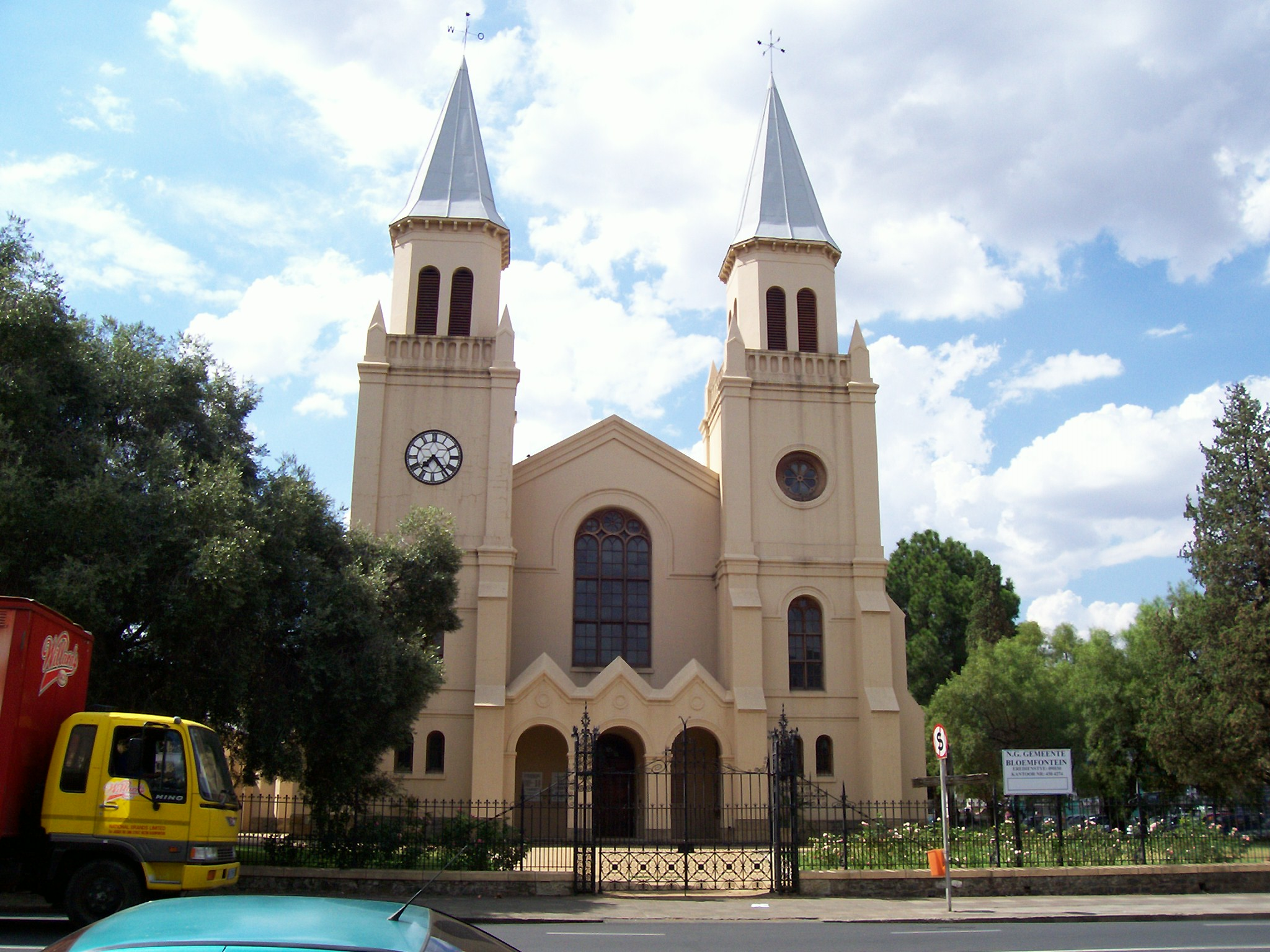

The Dutch Reformed Church in Bloemfontein, South Africa is the fourth oldest congregation of the Dutch Reformed Church in South Africa in the Free State Synod, but the 39th in the Church. The parish was founded on 30 November 1848, the same year as Fauresmith (11 March) and Smithfield (23 November).

== Background ==
The history of the mother congregation of the Free State capital, Bloemfontein, is closely connected with the early history of the Orange Free State. This is the history of migrant farmers north of the Groot River who, in the 1940s, settled especially in the vicinity of the Riet River, Smithfield and Winburg. In its formative years, this community enjoyed the spiritual work of Andrew Murray and A.A. Louw.

== Foundation ==
On 30 November 1848, three months after the Battle of Boomplaats, the congregation was founded when P.E. Faure and William Robertson, delegated by the NG Church in Cape Colony, held a meeting in Bloemfontein with the members of the Church who had settled north of the Gariep, in the "Trans Gariepsche Gebied", then known as the Sovereignty under the management of the British resident. At the congregation meeting, the first church council members were also chosen as elders.

In the presence of Faure and Robertson, the corner stone of the first church building was laid on 6 January 1849 by maj. Warden, the British resident. It is unknown when this church building was consecrated, because the church council minutes up to 17 January 1853 are missing, but it is known that the church services were still held under sail when it was closed. Andrew Murray on 6 May 1849 as first pastor of the newly founded congregation by his father, Andrew Murray Sr. of the NG congregation Graaff-Reinet, was ordained and confirmed, three days before his 21st birthday.
