= Orange River Colony =

British colony from 1902 to 1910

Coordinates: 29°S 26°E

Orange River Colony Oranjerivierkolonie
- 1902–1910
- Flag (1904–1910) Badge

- Status: British colony
- Capital: Bloemfontein
- Common languages: English(official), Afrikaans, Dutch, Sesotho
- Ethnic groups (1904): 58.11% Black; 36.83% White; 4.97% Coloured; 0.06% Asian
- Religion: Dutch Reformed Church; Anglican; African religions
- Government: Constitutional monarchy
- Monarch
  - 1902–1910: Edward VII
  - 1910: George V
- Governor
  - 1902–1905: Viscount Milner
  - 1905–1907: Earl of Selborne
  - 1907–1910: Sir Hamilton John Goold-Adams
- Prime Minister
  - 1907–1910: Abraham Fischer
- History
  - Established: 31 May 1902
  - British occupation: 28 May 1900
  - British annexation: 6 October 1900
  - Treaty of Vereeniging: 31 May 1902
  - Self-government: 27 November 1907
  - incorporation in the Union of South Africa: 31 May 1910
  - Disestablished: 31 May 1910

Population
  - 1904: 387,315
- Currency: Pound sterling
Preceded by	Succeeded by
Orange Free State	Union of South Africa
- Today part of: South Africa

The Orange River Colony was the British colony created after Britain first occupied (1900) and then annexed (1902) the independent Orange Free State in the Second Boer War. The colony ceased to exist in 1910, when it was absorbed into the Union of South Africa as the Orange Free State Province.

== Constitutional history ==
During the Second Boer War, British forces invaded the Orange Free State, occupying the capital, Bloemfontein by 13 March 1900. Five months later, on 6 October 1900, the British government declared an official annexation of the full territory of the Orange Free State, this in-spite of the fact they had not yet occupied the full territory, nor defeated the Free State forces.

The Free State government moved to Kroonstad during the early months of the war and its armies remained active in the field until the war's end. From the perspective of the Orange Free State, independence wasn't lost until they ratified the Treaty of Vereeniging on 31 May 1902.

On the Boer side, the government was led by state president Martinus Theunis Steyn (1857–1916) until 30 May 1902, when he went on sick-leave and was replaced by General Christiaan de Wet as acting state president. On the British side, Sir Alfred Milner was appointed Administrator of the Orange River Colony on 4 January 1901, with Hamilton John Goold-Adams as lieutenant-governor.

Following the end of hostilities, Lord Milner visited Bloemfontein on 23 June 1902 and promulgated the new constitution, in the presence of military officials, heads of civil department and representatives of the late Boer government, including General De Wet. Milner was sworn in as Governor and Commander-in-Chief of Orange River Colony on the same day.

From 1902 to 1910, the colony was governed by a single governor:

- Alfred Milner, Viscount Milner, in office 23 June 1902 – 1 April 1905;
- William Palmer, 2nd Earl of Selborne, in office 2 April 1905 – 7 June 1907;
- Sir Hamilton John Goold-Adams, in office 7 June 1907 – 31 May 1910

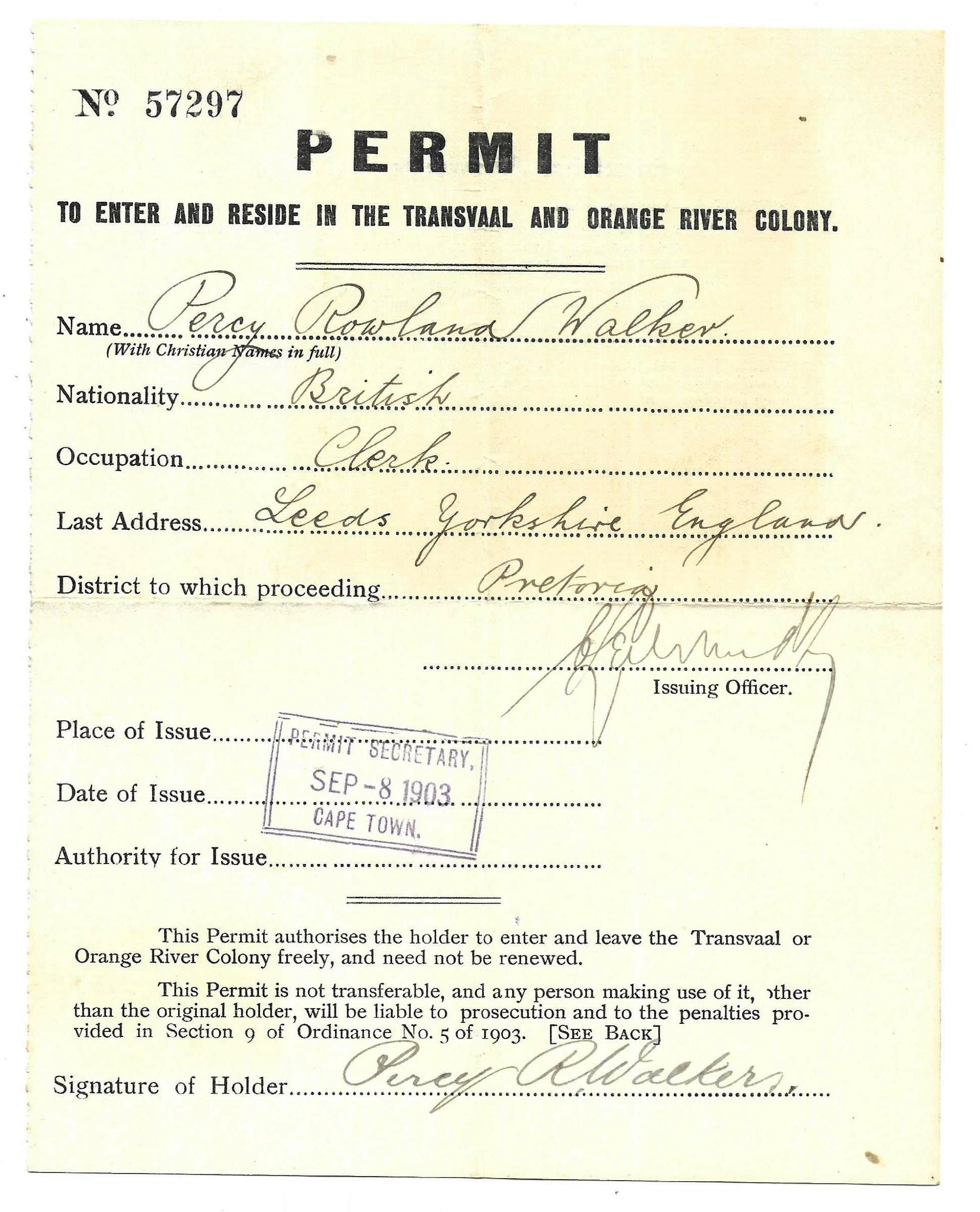
1903 British issued Orange River Colony permit following the Second Boer War.

== Self-government ==
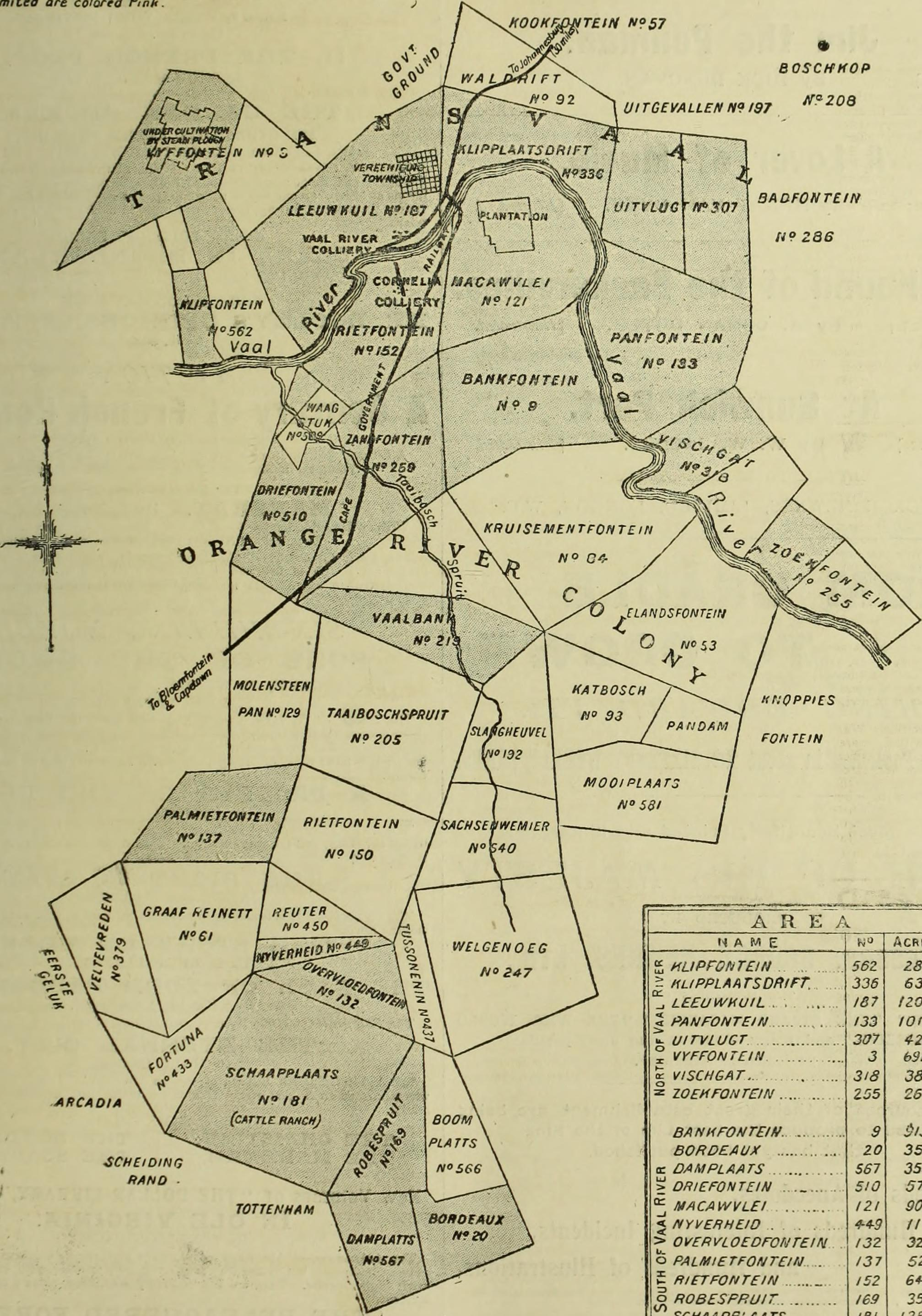
Map of a small part (across the Vaal River from Vereeniging) of the Orange River Colony, 1902

By 1904 sentiment was growing for some form of self-government. The Orangia Unie (Orange Union Party) was formally constituted in May 1906, after several months of preparation. A similar organisation, called Het Volk, had been formed by the Transvaal Boers in January 1905. Both unions had constitutions almost identical with that of the Afrikaner Bond, a former pan-Afrikaner political movement, and their aims were also similar – to secure the position of the Afrikaners in state and society. The chairman of the Orangia Unie was Abraham Fischer, leading politician of the pre-Boer War period and top diplomat of the Boer republics during the Second Boer War. Among the other prominent members were J. B. M. Hertzog, Christiaan de Wet and Martinus Theunis Steyn.

A second political party, the Constitutional Party was formed by a group of burghers content with British rule. Chairman of the party was Sir John G. Fraser, before the Second Boer War a prominent (pro-British) member of the Volksraad of the Orange Free State. The Constitutional Party had a strong following in Bloemfontein, but not outside the capital. The political programmes of the two parties were very similar, the real difference between them being the attitude towards British annexation and Afrikaner influence.

In 1905 Lord Selborne, formerly First Lord of the Admiralty, replaced Viscount Milner as high commissioner for South Africa and governor of the Transvaal and Orange River colonies. Selborne had come to South Africa with a brief to guide the former Boer republics from Crown colony government towards self-government. When Liberal Party came into office in Britain in December 1905 the process was speeded up, with the decision to give both the Transvaal and Orange River colonies self-government without delay. Selborne accepted the changed situation, and the experiment proved successful. He ceased to be governor of the Orange River Colony on its assumption of self-government in June 1907, but retained his other posts until May 1910, retiring on the eve of the establishment of the Union of South Africa.

On 7 January 1907 Selborne released a despatch, known as the Selborne Memorandum. It reviewed the situation in South Africa in all its economic and political aspects and was a masterly and comprehensive statement of the dangers inherent in the existing political system and of the advantages a political union offered. The document had a marked influence on the course of events and together with Selborne's conciliatory approach assisted in reconciling the Dutch and British communities of South Africa.

After the elections of 1907, the colony received self-government on 27 November 1907. Abraham Fischer became the first (and only) prime minister of the colony (in office 27 November 1907 – 31 May 1910). The first Legislative Assembly consisted of twenty-nine members of the Orangia Unie, five Constitutionalists and four independents. Fischer's cabinet consisted of:

- J.B.M. Hertzog, attorney-general and director of education;
- A. E. W. Ramsbottom, treasurer;
- Christiaan de Wet, minister of agriculture;
- Cornelius Hermanus Wessels, minister of public works

Fischer, besides the premiership, held the portfolio of colonial secretary. The first Legislative Council counted five members from the Orangia Unie, five Constitutionalists, and one independent member, in effect holding the balance.

== Policies ==
In May 1908, the Orange River Colony took part in an inter-state conference which met at Pretoria and Cape Town, and determined to renew the existing customs convention and to make no alteration in railway rates. These decisions were the result of an agreement to bring before the parliaments of the various colonies a resolution advocating the closer union of the South African states and the appointment of delegates to a national convention to frame a draft constitution.

At the eventual National Convention, former State President M. T. Steyn took a leading and conciliatory part, and subsequently the Orange River legislature agreed to the terms drawn up by the convention for the unification of the four self-governing colonies in the Union of South Africa. Under the imperial act by which unification was established (31 May 1910) the colony entered the Union under the style of the Orange Free State Province. Fischer and Hertzog became members of the first Union government, while A. E. W. Ramsbottom became the first administrator of the Orange Free State as a province of the Union.

== Demographics ==
=== Population at the 1904 census ===
Population figures for the 1904 census

Population group	Number	Percent (%)
Black	225,101	58.11
White	142,679	36.83
Coloured	19,282	4.97
Asian	253	0.06
Total	387,315	100.00

=== Religion in 1904 ===
Religions.	Persons.	Male.	Female.	Percentage.
Protestants	251,904	135,933	115,971	65.04%
Catholics	4,590	3,319	1,271	1.19%
Jews	1,616	1176	440	0.42%
Mohammedans	39	26	13	0.01%
Other sects	93	75	18	0.02%
No denomination	47	43	4	0.01%
No religion	127,637	68,536	59,101	32.95%
Unspecified	853	623	230	0.22%
Object to state	536	364	172	0.14%
Totals	387,315	210,095	177,220	100.0%

The 'no religion' heading also accounts for traditional African faiths which were not counted separately and constitute the largest portion of people professing no religion.

=== Religion in 1904 by race ===
Religion	European or White.			Aboriginal Natives.			Mixed and Other.			All Races.		
Religion	Persons.	Males.	Females.	Persons.	Males.	Females.	Persons.	Males.	Females.	Persons.	Males.	Females.
Total Population	142,679	81,571	61,108	229,149	120,064	109,085	15,487	8,460	7,027	387,315	210,095	177,220
I. - Protestants -												
Dutch Reformed Church	101,079	52,759	48,320	21,272	10,596	10,676	2,572	1,348	1,224	124,923	64,703	60,220
Gereformeerde Kerk	5,285	2,759	2,526	195	111	84	27	18	9	5,507	2,888	2,619
Church of England	17,879	13,884	4,495	14,782	8,020	6,762	1,887	1,011	876	34,548	22,415	12,133
Presbyterian	3,942	2,884	1,058	1,260	704	556	89	49	40	5,291	3,637	1,654
Independents and Congregationalists -												
Independents and Congregationalists	195	136	59	1,383	962	421	214	164	50	1,792	1,262	530
London Missionary Society				8	8		3	3		11	11	
Other Independents and Congregationalists												
Methodists -												
Wesleyan Methodists	5,121	3,016	2,105	51,576	25,650	25,926	4,163	2,141	2,022	60,860	30,807	30,053
Primitive Methodists	5	5		20	7	13	28	13	16	58	25	33
African Methodist Episcopal (Ethiopian)	2	2		3,747	1,856	1,891	361	181	180	4,110	2,039	2,071
Methodists	124	88	36	526	276	250	70	39	31	720	403	317
Other Methodists	1	1								1	1	
Other Protestants -												
Baptists	664	423	241	473	243	230	38	21	17	1,175	687	488
Berlin Mission												
Calvinists	4	3	1							4	3	1
Disciples of Christ, Church of Christ	6	4	2	18	10	8				24	14	10
German Evangelical	6	5	1							6	5	1
Lutheran	700	479	221	5,030	2,517	2,513	1,103	501	502	6,733	3,497	3,236
Moravians or United Brethren				201	117	84	29	17	12	230	134	96
Paris Missionary Society	11	4	7	3,197	1,708	1,489	275	155	120	3,483	1,867	1,615
Plymouth Brethren	18	12	6							18	12	6
Rhenish Mission	3	3		8	5	3	15	9	6	26	17	9
Salvation Army	140	80	60	18	14	4	12	7	5	170	101	69
Society of Friends, Quakers	5	5								5	5	
Unitarians	27	26	1	1	1					28	27	1
Other Protestants (defined)	120	71	49	87	54	33	14	5	9	221	130	91
Other Protestants (undefined)	1,248	829	419	544	302	242	91	51	40	1,883	1,182	701
Christians	21	17	4	43	34	9	18	10	8	82	61	21
II. - Catholics -												
Roman Catholics	3,286	2,521	765	1,093	640	453	115	71	44	4,494	3,232	1,262
Other Catholics	94	85	9				2	2		96	87	9
III. - Jews -	1,616	1,176	440							1,616	1,176	440
IV. - Mohammedans -	5	5		1	1		33	20	13	39	26	13
V. - Other Sects -	10	6	4	1	1		82	68	14	93	75	18
VI. - No Denomination -	41	38	3	4	4		2	1	1	47	43	4
VII. - No Religion -	121	97	24	123,258	65,947	57,311	4,258	2,492	1,766	127,637	68,536	59,101
VIII. - Unknown and Unspecified -	584	411	173	208	164	44	61	48	13	853	623	230
IX. - Object to State -	316	237	79	195	112	83	25	15	10	536	264	172

== See also ==
- Orange River Sovereignty
- Free State Province
- Vicariate Apostolic of Orange River for the Catholic missionary history
- Postage stamps and postal history of the Orange Free State
