= Consulates of the Orange Free State =

The Consulates of the Orange Free State formed the official representation of the Orange Free State, a Boer republic, abroad and were established in several European states and in the United States of America between 1855 until 31 May 1902, when the republic ceased to exist.

The first, and throughout the existence of the republic, most important consular post was the Consulate General of the Orange Free State in the Netherlands. Between 1871 and 1902, the consul general in the Netherlands at times also held diplomatic prerogatives, with the title of 'special envoy'. In this capacity, the incumbent was charged with negotiating and concluding treaties with other states and international organizations on behalf of the Orange Free State government.
