= Jacobus Nicolaas Boshoff =

South African Boer statesman

Jacobus Nicolaas Boshof
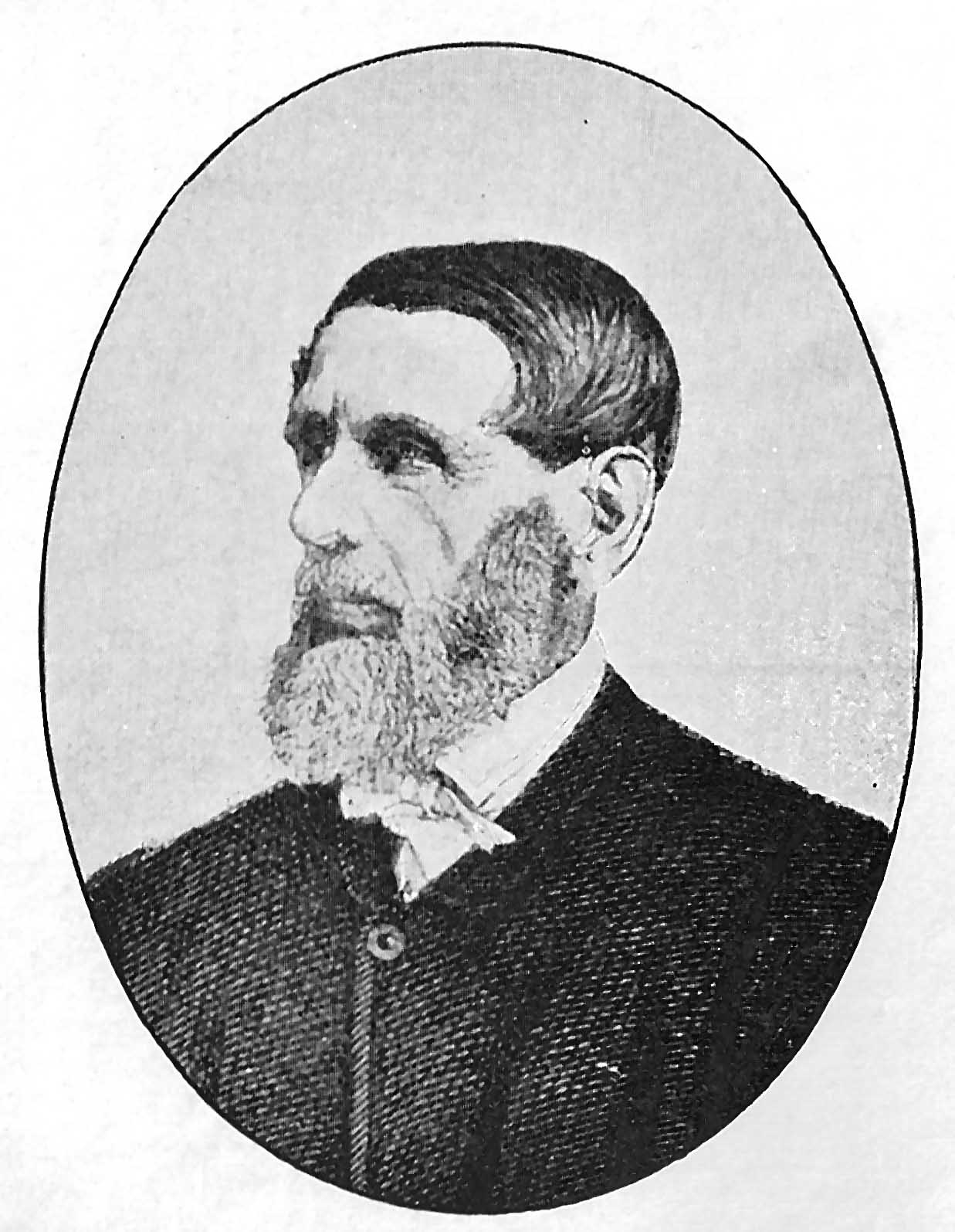

2nd State President of the Orange Free State
- In office 27 August 1855 – 6 September 1859
- Preceded by: Josias Philip Hoffman
- Succeeded by: Esaias Reynier Snijman

Personal details
- Born: 31 January 1808 Derdeheuwel, Montagu; Cape Colony
- Died: 21 April 1881 (aged 73) Weston, Pietermaritzburg, Colony of Natal
- Spouse(s): Adriana Petronella Gertruida van Aswegen; Louisa Perry van der Berg

Jacobus Nicolaas Boshof (31 January 1808 – 21 April 1881) was a South African (Boer) statesman, a late-arriving member of the Voortrekker movement, and the second state president of the Orange Free State, in office from 1855 to 1859.

== Biography ==
=== Family ===
A claim that Boshof had been a member of a Huguenot family from the Cape Colony, originally bearing the surname Boseau, was proved to be unfounded by genealogical research. He was actually a great-grandchild of Willem Hendrik Boshof (with one f), who came to the Cape from Texel in the Netherlands in 1741.

Jacobus Nicolaas Boshof (the third of that name) was born on the farm De Derde Heuvel achter de Cogmans Kloof, Swellendam district (now Derdeheuwel, Montagu district) and was educated at first in Swellendam, but later in Graaff-Reinet under the Scottish dominy (teacher) William Robertson, who later returned to Scotland to become a minister of the Church of Scotland.

Boshof was married twice, first to Adriana Petronella Gertruida van Aswegen (Graaff-Reinet on 3 November 1827) and after her death in 1878 to Louisa Perry, the widow of one Van den Berg (26 May 1880).

While most members of his family spelt the surname as Boshoff, and still do, J. N. Boshof used just one f. The Free State town of Boshof, close to Kimberley, is named after him.

His eldest son, also Jacobus Nicolaas Boshof, served as clerk to the landdrost at Philippolis and was landdrost at Boshof for some years. In 1882 President Paul Kruger invited him to Pretoria to take up the post of Treasurer-General of the South African Republic.

=== Early career ===
In 1824 Boshof became a clerk in the Civil Commissioner's office in Graaff-Reinet, where he worked for 14 years under magistrates like Andries Stockenström, Egbertus Bergh and W van Ryneveld. He was promoted to chief clerk and acted as sheriff. 1824 was also the year that the Scottish minister of the Dutch Reformed Church in Graaff-Reinet, the Rev Andrew Murray, confirmed Boshof in the Christian Faith.

In May 1838 Boshof used his annual leave to accompany his uncle, Field-Cornet (later Commandant) Gideon Joubert, to Natal. Joubert had been commissioned to bring back to the Cape Colony, if they so wished, freed slaves who lived with the Voortrekkers.

While in the Republic of Natalia Boshof drew up a set of regulations for Voortrekker officials and presided at a public meeting.

Unfortunately he overstayed his leave and was dismissed by Andries Stockenström, now Lieutenant-Governor of the Eastern Province. Boshof travelled to Cape Town to put his case to the Governor and to the Secretary for the Colonies, Lord Glenelg, but without success. Before leaving the colony permanently to live in Natal, Boshof wrote three letters to the Grahamstown Journal early in 1839 in which he presented an analysis of the causes of the Great Trek.

Boshof and his family (including his parents) apparently left the same year, but is first mentioned in documents of the Republiek Natalia in January 1841, when he and J P Zietsman were asked by the Volksraad to draft a reply to Sir George Napier, Governor of the Cape, on matters relating to Natal. He shortly afterwards became a member of the Volksraad and served as Landdrost of Pietermaritzburg from 01-02-1841 to 01-11-1842, retaining his seat in the Volksraad during this time. He also served on a number of commissions and sat as chairman of the Volksraad on several occasions.

Boshof was also called upon to respond to Napier when, on 02-12-1841, the Governor announced his intention to occupy Port Natal and denied the Boer emigrants their independence. The response appeared on 21-02-1842, and became known as the Boers' official apologia. As Volksraad chairman he also negotiated the cession of Natal with Col Abraham Josias Cloete, who was Napier's representative.

The Volksraad continued to sit regularly until October 1845, although it had virtually no power any longer.

Boshof's efforts to reconcile the Boers and the British authorities would appear to be behind his re-appointment in the civil service. (Natal was officially part of the Cape Colony at this stage, although separated by the independent chiefdoms of the Ciskei and Transkei regions.)

In 1845 he became registrar and master of the Supreme Court in Pietermaritzburg. In 1847 he was appointed resident magistrate of Klip River, and in 1850 resident magistrate of Pietermaritzburg. At this time he also served on the Lands Commission and on the Pietermaritzburg Municipal Council, and drafted municipal regulations for the capital.

=== State president ===
In 1855 Boshof, then living in Graaff-Reinet, stood for election as state president of the Orange Free State, against the chairman of the Presidential Executive Commission J. J. Venter and A. du Toit from Beaufort West. He won the election with a majority.

During his term of office Boshof laid the foundation stone of Grey College in Bloemfontein on 13 October 1856, endowed by and named after Sir George Grey, governor of the Cape Colony and High Commissioner for South Africa.

Politics in the Orange Free State were still rather volatile and personal in the 1850s and there were conflicts regularly between the Volksraad and the state president. In the process heavy political decisions were often made light-heartedly, and as easily reversed. On 25 February 1858 Boshof handed in his resignation effective 15 March 1858 over a dispute about the order of the meetings of the Volksraad. The Volksraad accepted the resignation, but also showed its displeasure about it. Eventually Boshof withdrew his resignation after some discussions, but this in turn effected the resignation of several Volksraad members, among whom the chairman. In town sentiments ran high as well, mainly in support of Boshof, with people shooting in the air, and throwing "turpentine balls".

Early in 1858 tensions rose on the border with Basotho territory and war seemed inevitable. As the state finances were in dire straits at the time, Boshof had great difficulty in organising the defence and buying arms. On the purchase of 50 rifles at £6 apiece he had to request a delay in payment of six months. Either assistance from the Transvaal or intervention from the Cape Colony seemed inevitable. The government of the Orange Free State asked Governor Sir Grey to intermediate between the Orange Free State and the Basotho. This expired in August and September 1858, resulting in the Treaty of Aliwal North on 29 September 1858. In it, the Basotho and Orange Free State jurisdictions were for the first time clearly demarcated, as were several legal provisions. In the meantime, a movement had developed that aspired to a union or amalgamation of the Orange Free State with the South African Republic. In November 1858 Boshof in turn made clear that he wanted to go on leave to Natal for several months. Eventually he would leave Bloemfontein in February 1859, tired of the burden of his high office. The peace treaty with the Basotho did not put an end to the frontier skirmishes. Closer co-operation with the Cape Colony had been ruled out by the British government. And last but not least, the supporters of a union with the South African Republic now forcefully pushed for a personal union with Marthinus Wessel Pretorius as president of both Boer republics. Boshof did not return from his leave, but handed in his final resignation from Natal in June 1859.

In 1860 Pretorius was elected as his successor and the two Boer republics were then briefly united under one head of state with a dual mandate. The experiment failed quickly however, with Pretorius first resigning the Transvaal presidency and not finishing his term in the Orange Free State. For the new elections in 1863, Boshof was named as one of four candidates, but eventually J.H. Brand was put forward by the Volksraad as the sole candidate.

=== Later life and death ===
Boshof continued his political career in Natal as member of the Legislative Assembly for the Klip River District (1866). He died in Weston, Pietermaritzburg on 21 April 1881 and was buried in the Voortrekker cemetery in Pietermaritzburg. Upon the news of his death reaching Bloemfontein, the Volksraad passed a resolution honouring Boshof for his services to the Orange Free State.
