= Josias Philip Hoffman =

South African Boer statesman

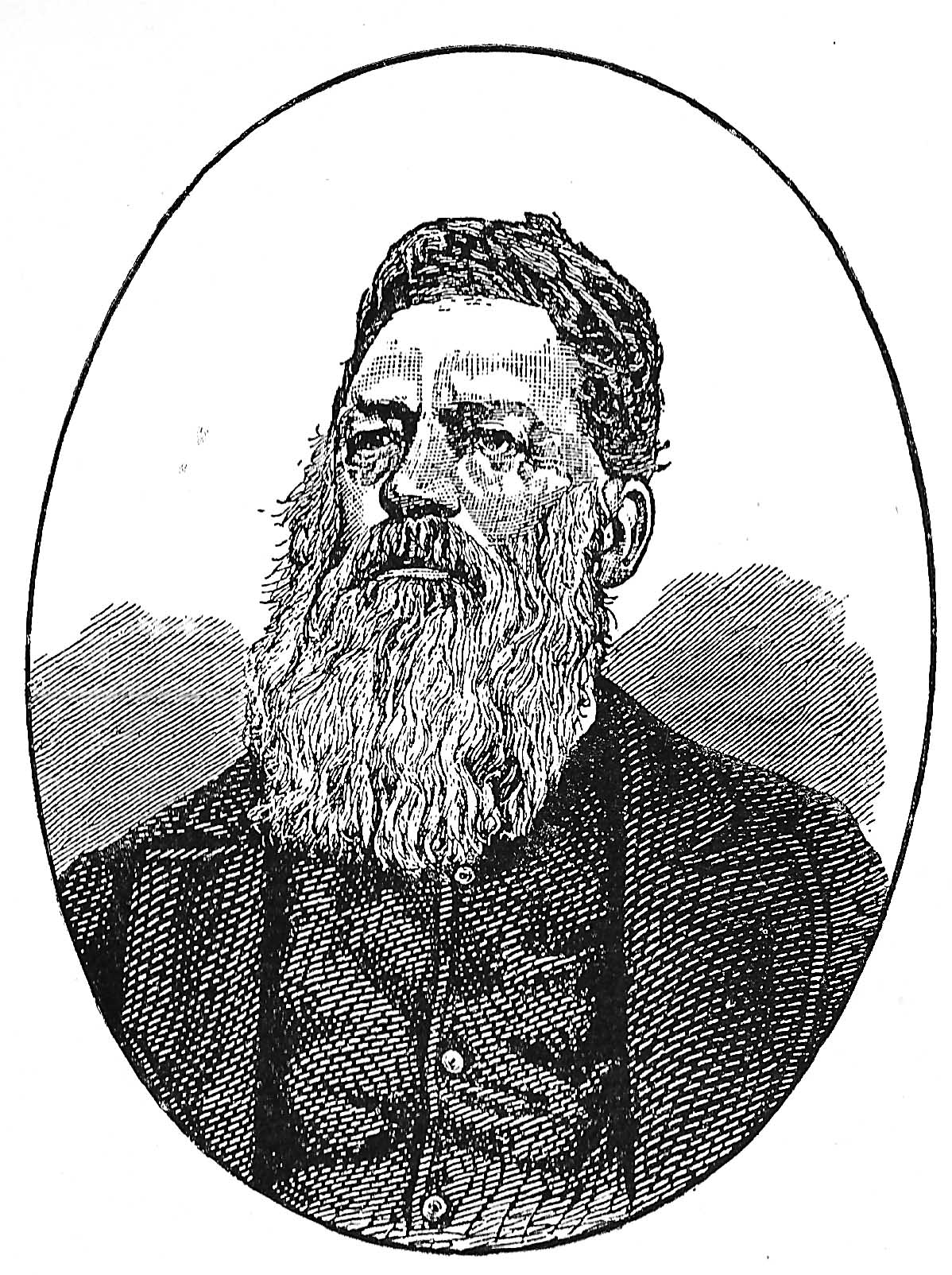

1st State President of the Orange Free State
- In office 15 June 1854 – 10 February 1855
- Preceded by: New office
- Succeeded by: J.N. Boshoff

Chairman of the Provisional Government of the Orange Free State
- In office 23 February 1854 – 29 March 1854
- Preceded by: New office
- Succeeded by: Office abolished

Chairman of the Volksraad of the Orange Free State
- In office 29 March 1854 – Early April 1854
- Preceded by: New office
- Succeeded by: Henry Halse

Acting State President of the Orange Free State
- In office 18 April 1854 – 15 June 1855
- Preceded by: J. Groenendaal (act.)
- Succeeded by: J.P. Hoffman

Personal details
- Born: 30 December 1807 Stellenbosch, South Africa
- Died: 17 October 1879 (aged 71) Slootkraal, South Africa
- Spouse: Marthina Johanna Hoffman
- Occupation: Politician

Josias Philip Hoffman (commonly known as Sias Hoffman; 1807–1879) was a South African Boer statesman, and was the chairman of the Provisional Government and later the first State President of the Orange Free State, in office from 1854 to 1855.

== Early life ==
Hoffman was born on 30 December 1807 in Stellenbosch, in the Cape Colony. His father, Josias Eduard Hoffman (1773–1871) was the grandson of a wealthy Stellenbosh landowner and one time landdrost Capt. Johan Bernhard Hoffman (1720–1800) who at one point owned both the farms of Blauwklippen and Libertas and was also Captain of the Castle guard in Cape Town. He was the 7th of 16 children born to his parents, and his father's direct heir, being his third, but only surviving son, his elder brother Matthiam having died in Calcutta in 1818. His uncle Johan Bernard Hoffman III inherited Libertas, while Blauwklippen went into his great-uncle Diederik Wouter Hoffman's line.

== Career ==
Hoffman was one of the representatives of the Smithfield District in the Orange River Sovereignty during the negotiations between Boers and British about the independence of the territory. He acted as chairman of the Boer deputation in the negotiations and signed the Orange River Convention of 23 February 1854 in that capacity.

He was first appointed chairman of the Provisional Government (23 February – 29 March 1854) and after a short intermezzo as chairman of the Volksraad he was first elected Acting State President (18 April – 15 June) and eventually the first substantial State President of the Orange Free State.

Both Hoffman and his State Secretary J. Groenendaal were cripples, reason for their government to quickly gain the nickname 'the crippled government'.

Hoffman's term in office was short-lived, just under one year, and ended with a political incident. As a gesture of good faith, Hoffman had given a present of a keg of gunpowder to the Basotho king Moshoeshoe I. His fellow burghers found this an unwise move, over-friendly and potentially dangerous for the survival of the new state. Relations between the Boers and the Basotho were less than cordial at the time. A greater sin than the gift itself was that Hoffman had tried to hide it from the Volksraad, the Orange Free State parliament.

Hoffman was asked to step down but refused. Commandant Johan Fick was asked to lead 1,200 men to the presidential residence to ask Hoffman to step down. He first refused, but once Fick set up cannons facing the residence, Hoffman agreed to leave the office and did so on 10 February 1855. He was succeeded by a (temporary) Presidential Executive Commission, chaired by the influential burgher J.J. Venter.

He died on his farm ('plaas') Slootkraal, District Wepener, Orange Free State on 13 October 1879.

== See also ==
- Orange River Sovereignty
- Moshoeshoe I
- Basotho
