= John G. Fraser =

Orange Free State lawyer & politician (1840–1927)

Sir John George Fraser (17 December 1840 – 22 June 1927) was a prominent Orange Free State lawyer, politician, statesman and member of the Volksraad. He was knighted in 1905.

== Early years ==
Born in Beaufort West, he was the eldest son of the marriage of the Rev. Colin Mackenzie Fraser to Maria Elisabeth Sieberhagen (1812–1862); they were married on 20 February 1840 and had nine children.

Fraser was educated in Scotland between 1852 and 1861 at the Free Church Institution of Inverness and Marischal College in Aberdeen (later a part of the University of Aberdeen. As a member of the Philippolis Commando he was involved in the hostilities with the BaSotho during the 1860s. He became Secretary to President Brand of the Orange Free State in 1871.

Between 1871 and 1876, Fraser held appointments as Secretary to the Volksraad, Registrar of the High Court and Master of the Orphan and Insolvent Chambers. He studied law at the same time and qualified as a lawyer, commencing legal practice in Bloemfontein on 1 July 1877. In 1879 he was elected to the Volksraad for the first time - as the member for Knapzak Rivier near Philippolis. He took his seat on 3 May 1880. The following year he became member for Bloemfontein, a position he was to hold until the Anglo-Boer War. He took an active part in legislative matters and on 5 May 1884 he was elected Chairman of the Volksraad. He was re-elected annually to this position for 12 years. He was Superintendent of the Dutch Reformed Church Sunday School for 34 years; Deacon and Elder in the same church; Secretary of the Board of Trustees of Grey College for 25 years, and Secretary of the Boards of the Infant School and of Eunice Girls High School until 1904. In 1892 he presented a mission church, built on the corner of Harvey Street to the D.R. Church.

Fraser was a key player in the negotiations with the South African Republic and President Kruger in the late 1880s. He provides much detail in his book Episodes in My Life (Cape Town: Juta, 1922) about negotiations regarding the proposed Customs Union, the building of railways and defence pacts. Fraser distrusted Kruger. Fraser stood for election to the position of President of the Orange Free State in 1896 and was defeated by Marthinus Theunis Steyn (the husband of his niece Rachel Isabella Fraser). He resigned his position as President of the Volksraad in 1896. He remained in Bloemfontein during the Anglo-Boer War.

Following the departure of the Boer Army from Bloemfontein and the imminent arrival of the British Army, on 15 March 1900 John Fraser, accompanied by the Landdrost, Mr. H.D. Papenfus and the Sheriff, Mr. Raaff, went out and surrendered the city to Lord Roberts. John Fraser was knighted in 1905 and elected as a Senator in the first Union Parliament in 1910.

== Family and Personal life ==
John Fraser's father was the Rev. Colin Mackenzie Fraser, who was one of a large group of Presbyterian ministers "imported" to the Cape of Good Hope in the 1820s and 1830s to "anglicise" the Dutch Reformed Church. He married Anna Amalia Muller (1799–1838) on 27 February 1828. They had seven children, one of whom, Colin MacKenzie Fraser II, was the Minister of the Dutch Reformed Church at Philippolis and was the father of Rachel Isabella Fraser, who later married future President MT Steyn.

John Fraser was married to Dorothea Ortlepp (1845–1930) on 18 April 1866. They had eleven children. The second daughter, Maria Elizabeth Carolina Fraser, married Gideon Brand van Zyl who served as Governor General of the Union of South Africa from 1945 to 1950 and was appointed to the Privy Council by King George VI in 1945.

He died in Bloemfontein on 22 June 1927.
