= Burgher (Boer republics) =

Citizens of South Africa

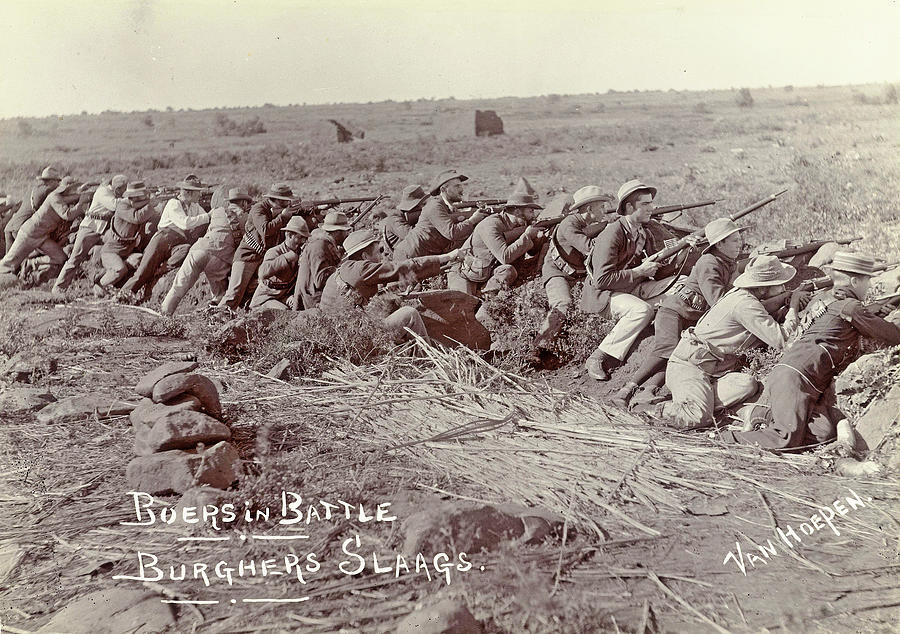
Boers in Battle (Burghers Slaags), c.1899-1902

In the Boer Republics of 19th century South Africa, a burgher was a fully enfranchised citizen. Burgher rights were restricted to white men, in particular Boers.

== Terminology and origins ==
Historically Burgher refers to a non-slave or serf citizen of a town or city, typically a member of the wealth bourgeoisie. (See also Burgher (title)).

In South Africa, the word has its origins from the term free burghers. After the establishment of the settlement at the Cape by the Dutch East India Company (VOC) several servants were issued with free papers in 1657 relieving them from their service to the Company. These people were referred to as the Free Burghers. Free burgher status included privileges such as land ownership and making use of the land to farm and supply produce to the Company usually at fixed rates.

The free burghers who settled permanently in the Cape area brought about the inception of the Boers who migrated further into the interior of South Africa. Several expansions such as the Trekboers and the Great Trek eventually led to the establishment of the Boer republics in 1852. Typically a citizen of the Orange Free State would be referred to as a 'Burgher of the Free State'.

The rights to political representation and the ownership of property were collectively referred to as "burgher rights". In the Orange Free State (1854–1902), the constitution restricted burgher rights to white male residents only. The coloured people (those of mixed ancestry and who were mostly servants) had some rights regarding property but they were not burghers. The South African Republic, or Transvaal (1852–1902), gave burgher rights to white males only and explicitly barred their extension to "persons of colour". A bill passed in the Transvaal in 1858 permitted "no equality between the white and coloured inhabitants, neither in Church nor in State". Burghers were "citizen-soldiers" who, between the ages of 16 and 60, were obliged to serve without pay in the republic's commandos, providing their own horse and rifle, 30 rounds of ammunition and their own rations for the first ten days. Most of them were Boers.

== History ==
Following the discovery of diamonds and gold in the Boer Republics and their environs in the 1870s and 1880s, white immigrants of mostly British stock began moving to the region in large numbers. The Boers referred to these people as uitlanders ("out landers"). The uitlanders demanded full burgher rights in the Transvaal, but the local government under President Paul Kruger was unwilling to grant these, surmising that the sheer number of uitlanders might imperil the republic's independence. The Irish Transvaal Brigade was established days before the outbreak of the Second Boer War and initially consisted of Irishmen who worked in the Witwatersrand. These volunteers were given full citizenship and became Burghers of the Boer republics. Under the leadership of John MacBride, the brigade was strengthened by volunteers traveling from Ireland via Delagoa Bay into South Africa.

The uitlander problem and the associated tensions between the South African Republic and Britain led to the Jameson Raid of 1895–96 and ultimately the Second Boer War of 1899–1902. Following the British victory in the latter and the Treaty of Vereeniging, the Free State and the Transvaal were annexed by Britain as the Orange River Colony and Transvaal Colony.

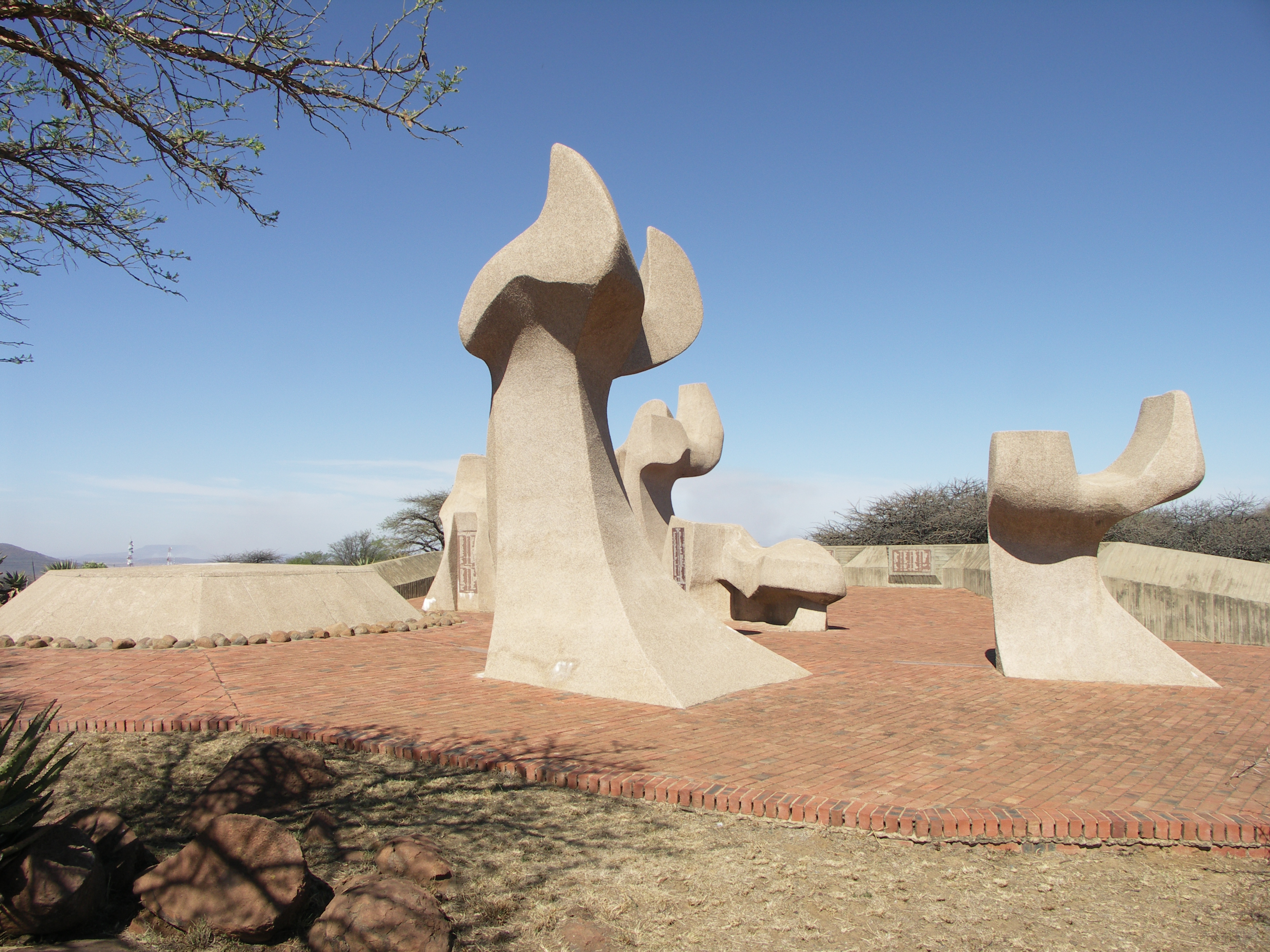
Wagon Hill Burgher Memorial

The Burgher Memorial near Ladysmith were unveiled in 1979 in memory of the 781 Burghers who died during the Second Boer War. The memorial contains the remains of 310 burghers who died during battles in Natal. Six structures symbolizing hands reaching upwards and one hand pointing downwards are presented.

== See also ==
- History of South Africa
- List of years in South Africa
- White South African
- Free Burghers in the Dutch Cape Colony
