= Volksraad (Orange Free State) =

Abolished legislature of the Orange Free State

Volksraad van die Oranje-Vrystaat
- Coat of arms of the Orange Free State

Type
- Type: Unicameral

History
- Established: 1854
- Disbanded: 31 May 1902

Structure
- Seats: 57
- Length of term: 4 years

Meeting place
- Bloemfontein

The Volksraad of the Orange Free State (Afrikaans: Volksraad van die Oranje-Vrystaat) was the unicameral parliament of the Orange Free State, and the supreme authority of the country.

The Volksraad had 57 members representing major town and districts in the republic. The members, elected for four years, half of them retiring every second year, had to be of European blood, over twenty-five years old, resident in the republic for at least one year, possessed real estate of the value of £200, and never convicted a crime. Burghers were able to vote. The districts represented by members of the Volksraad were Bloemfontein, Fauresmith, Caledon River, Winburg, Harrismith, Kroonstad, Boshof, Bethulie, Philippolis and Jacobsdal.

The Volksraad met once a year in ordinary session in Bloemfontein. The Volksraad met in Kroonstad in 1900, during the Second Boer War.

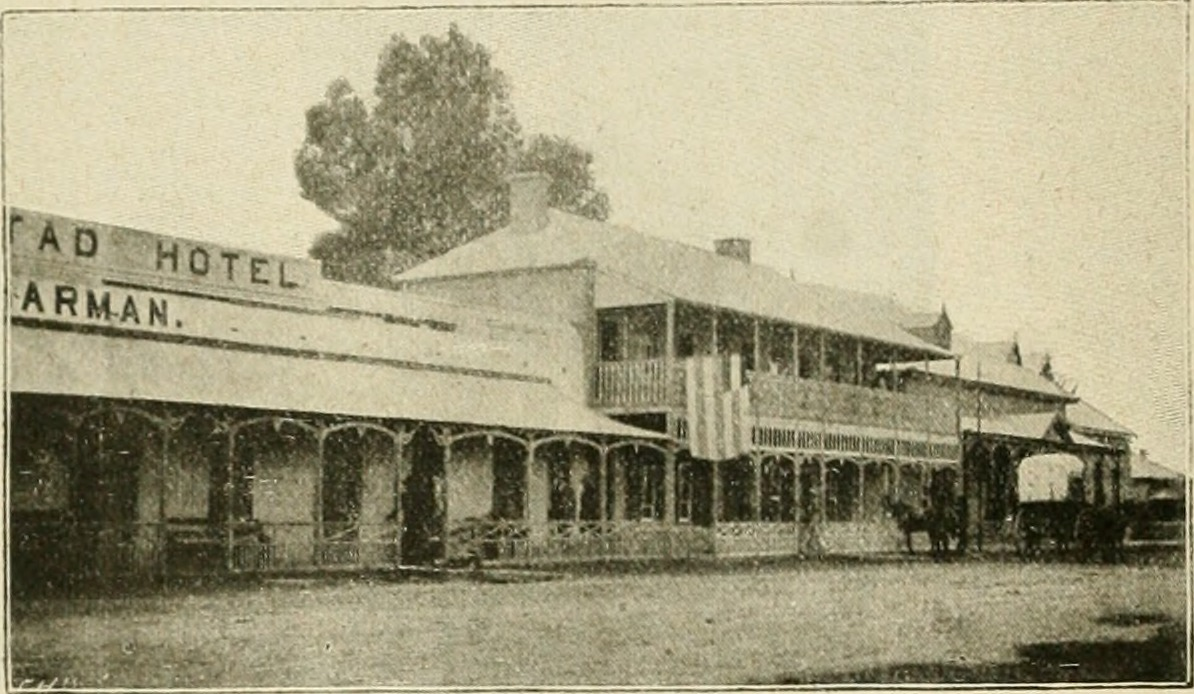
Parliament House of the Orange Free State

== Chairmen ==
The chairman of the Volksraad (Voorzitter van den Volksraad) was elected annually.

Chairman	Took office	Left office	Notes
Josias Philip Hoffman	March 1854	June 1854	
Henry Halse	June 1854	?	
Gert Petrus Visser	1855	?	
Lodewyk Jacobus Papenfus	?-1857	1857-?	
Esaias Reynier Snijman	?-1859	1859-?	
J. N. Uijs	?-1860	1860-?	
Gert Petrus Visser	?-1861	1863-?	
Esaias Reynier Snijman	?-1864	1864-?	
Gert Petrus Visser	?-1865	1865-?	
Hendrik Oostewald Dreyer	?-1866	1866	
Gerhardus Johannes du Toit	1866	?	
Gert Petrus Visser	?-1867	1875-?	
Tobias de Villiers	?-1876	1876-?	
Gert Petrus Visser	?-1877	1879	
Tobias de Villiers	1879	1884	
John G. Fraser	1884	1896	
Christiaan Willem Hendrik Van Der Post	1896	1897	
Cornelius Hermanus Wessels	1897	1899-?	
Johan Godfried Luyt	June 1900	June 1900	Last chairman
