= 1888 Orange Free State presidential election =

← 1883	December 1888	1893 →
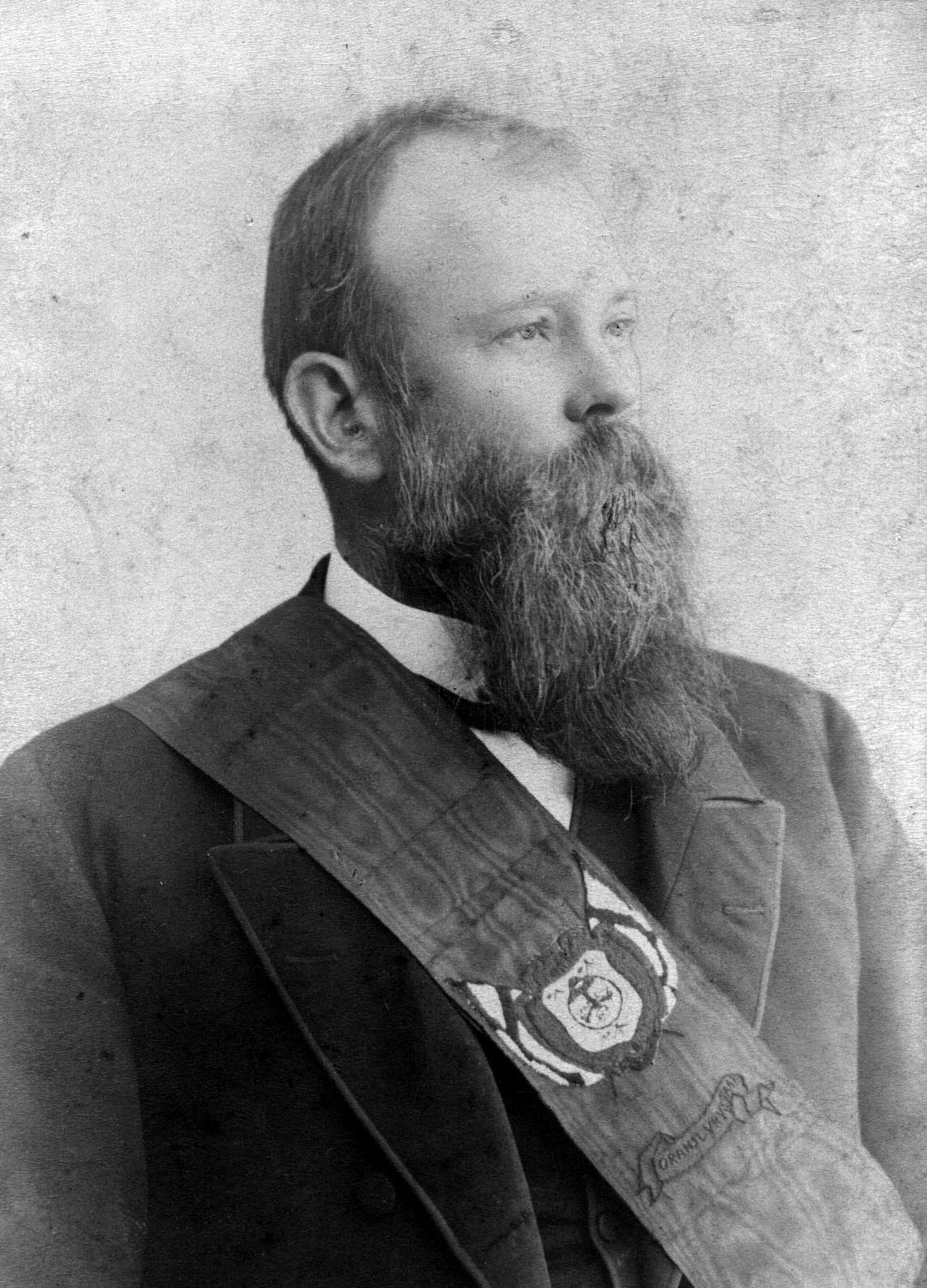
Nominee	Francis William Reitz
President before election
Johannes Brand
Elected President
Francis William Reitz

Presidential elections were held in the Orange Free State in December 1888. The elections saw a victory for popular political figure and war hero Francis William Reitz. As the election followed the death of incumbent president Johannes Brand, Reitz ran unopposed. Pieter Jeremias Blignaut, who was acting president following Brand's death, refused to seek election.
