= Martinus Theunis Steyn =

South African lawyer and statesman (1857–1916)

Marthinus Theunis Steyn
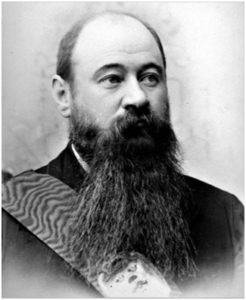

6th State President of the Orange Free State
- In office 4 March 1896 – 30 May 1902
- Preceded by: Francis William Reitz
- Succeeded by: Christiaan de Wet (acting)

Personal details
- Born: 2 October 1857 Winburg, Orange Free State
- Died: 28 November 1916 (aged 58) Bloemfontein, Orange Free State Province, Union of South Africa
- Party: South African Party; National Party
- Spouse: Rachel Isabella (Tibbie) Fraser
- Education: Grey College, Leiden University
- Occupation: Lawyer

Martinus (or Marthinus) Theunis Steyn (Afrikaans pronunciation: [stəin]; 2 October 1857 – 28 November 1916) was a South African lawyer, politician, and statesman. He was the sixth and last president of the independent Orange Free State from 1896 to 1902.

== Early life ==
The Steyn family lived near Winburg on the farm Josephinesdal. Steyn was born on 2 October 1857 on the farm Rietfontein near Winburg in the Orange Free State. His father Marthinus (known as Marthinus 'blinkstewels') was away from home, following the death of his own father, to assist his mother on a three-month-long round trip from Winburg to Swellendam in the Cape Colony. As Steyn's mother, Cecilia, was pregnant with Marthinus Theunis, they thought it safer for her to stay with her sister Gertruida, who was married to Theunis Wessels, a farmer at Rietfontein. Steyn was intended to be named only Marthinus after his father, but because of the care that Theunis and Gertruida took during Cecilia's pregnancy, Steyn was named both after his father Marthinus and his uncle Theunis. In later years his family always called him Theunis.

During the Free State–Basotho War of 1858, the Steyns were driven from their farm and lost almost everything. After the death of Steyn's two grandfathers, his Wessels grandmother convinced his father to buy his own farm. They bought the farm Suurfontein/Zuurfontein, on the Modder River, about 13 miles from Bloemfontein. It is on this farm that Steyn spent most of his youth, and experienced the open and free spaces of the Free State.

Steyn started his school years in a small farm school, on the farm Rooiwal. The school was forty minutes away by horse and the teacher was Mr. Wiggins, who taught in English. Another Basotho War started in 1864, disrupting the family, and causing Theunis and his brother Tewie to stay with their grandmother in Wessels, where they attended a small grammar school briefly; afterward they were sent to Grey College.

At the age of 16, he left school with his brother Tewie to farm on Zuurfontein. Steyn's family lived right across from the then president of the Free State, J.H. Brand, in Bloemfontein. The family socialized with other groups of Dutch families. The Steyn home in Bloemfontein, Green Lodge, was the meeting place for the young people of Bloemfontein. The house was open for everybody: from the Fichardts of German origin, to the English speaking Robertses, to the Jewish Baumans, to English speaking Afrikaners, like President Brand, as well as the Dutch community.

== Studies ==
After finishing his studies at Grey College, and after farming for four years on Suurfontein/Zuurfontein, a visit by Judge James Buchanan, a member of the Orange Free State High Court changed Steyn's direction from farming towards further studies in law. According to Judge Buchanan's daughter, he was set on convincing Steyn's father that they needed to send Steyn to the Netherlands to study law at Leiden University.

Steyn and his friend Harry Vels left in May 1877 on the Dunrobin Castle from Port Elizabeth for Cape Town and from there to Europe. In Cape Town, more passengers, including Rev. Colin Fraser and his family, on his way to Scotland as a delegate for the Free State Church at the Pan-Presbyterian Council (now known as the World Alliance of Reformed Churches), (accompanied by the 12-year-old Tibbie Fraser, later to become the wife of Steyn). Also on board was the Zuid-Afrikaansche Republiek government delegation consisting of Paul Kruger, the then Vice State President, E.J.P. Jorissen, the state attorney and their secretary, Willem Eduard Bok, on their way to England to lay a formal protest against the proclamation of Theophilus Shepstone asserting British sovereignty over the Zuid-Afrikaansche Republiek.

Steyn and Vels did preparatory studies under W.F.P. Enklaar and Dr. B. Wisselink at the Gymnasium in Deventer. In September 1879, they would have taken their admission exams for the Leiden University, however, they decided to move to England instead. This decision was made as they needed an English certificate and training to be allowed to practice law in South Africa. Steyn took his admission exam in January 1880 for the Inner Temple in London. Steyn was called to the English bar in November 1882 and shortly afterward returned to South Africa.

== Law career ==
After his return to South Africa he set up practice as barrister in Bloemfontein. In 1889, Steyn was appointed state attorney of the Orange Free State. A few months afterwards he became second puisne judge, and in 1893 first puisne judge of the high court. His decisions won him a reputation for ability and sound judgment.

== Early political career ==
Marthinus 'blinkstewels', father of Steyn, as member of the Executive Council, regularly accompanied State President Johannes Brand on visits to determine the needs of the people of the Orange Free State. Steyn, as a lover of books, who took a small library of books with him during the Anglo-Boer War, was well read. Through his father and visits home, he kept in contact with the latest political views, activities and needs of the people.

Steyn's first interest in the politics of the day was initiated by the disputed annexation of the diamond fields in the Kimberley area by the British government in 1871. Following the claims of the Griqua captain, Nicolaas Waterboer, the British government agreed that the Cape Governor, Sir Henry Barkly, could annex the land, in direct conflict to the wishes of the Cape Colony Government and the Orange River Convention (Bloemfontein Convention) of 1854. The resolution of the payment, £90, 000 and the building of a railway to the Orange Free State by the British government in 1876, was not deemed acceptable to the general public.

== President of the Orange Free State ==
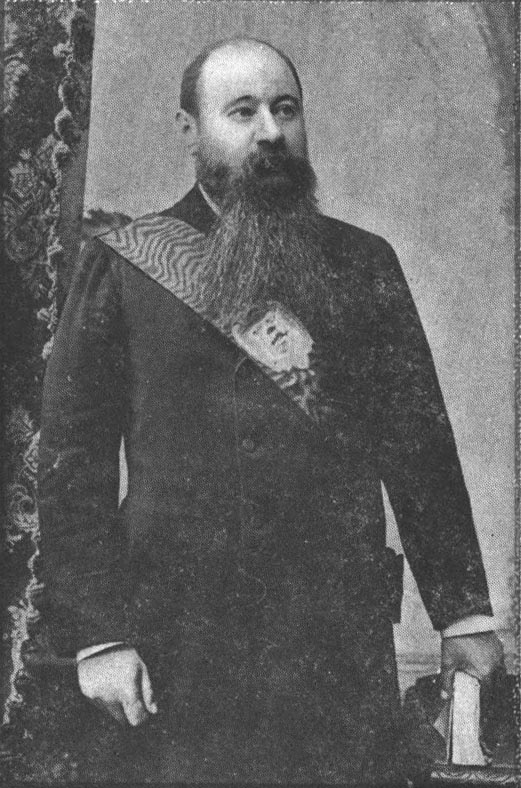
MT Steyn During his Presidential Inauguration

In 1895, upon the resignation of state president Francis William Reitz, Steyn was the candidate of the pan-Dutch party for the vacant post. The election was held in February 1896 and resulted in a decisive victory for Steyn, who assumed office as president. The beginning of the Second Boer War, in 1899, caused Steyn to link the fortunes of his state with those of the Transvaal, allying with it against the British Empire. While the Orange Free State was occupied by the British, Steyn ran his government from the field, playing a key role in continuing Boer resistance and the coordination of guerrilla warfare that made up most of the Boer War from 1900 onwards.

Regarded as one of the most irreconcilable of the Boer leaders, he took part, however, in the preliminary peace negotiations at Klerksdorp in April 1902 but was prevented by illness from signing the Treaty of Vereeniging at Pretoria on 31 May 1902. The treaty ended the independence of the Orange Free State and Steyn's term as its president.

== After 1902 ==
By 1902, Steyn was suffering from myasthenia gravis brought on by his constant exertions; and in July 1902 he sailed for Europe, where he remained until the autumn of 1904. He then took the oath of allegiance to the British crown, and returning to South Africa partially restored to health resumed active participation in politics. In 1908–1909, he was vice-president of the National Convention, the constitutional convention which resulted in the establishment of the Union of South Africa. Here he was distinguished for his statesmanlike and conciliatory attitude, while maintaining the rights of the Boer community.

While addressing a meeting in Bloemfontein in November 1916, he collapsed and died of a heart attack, at 59.

== Legacy ==
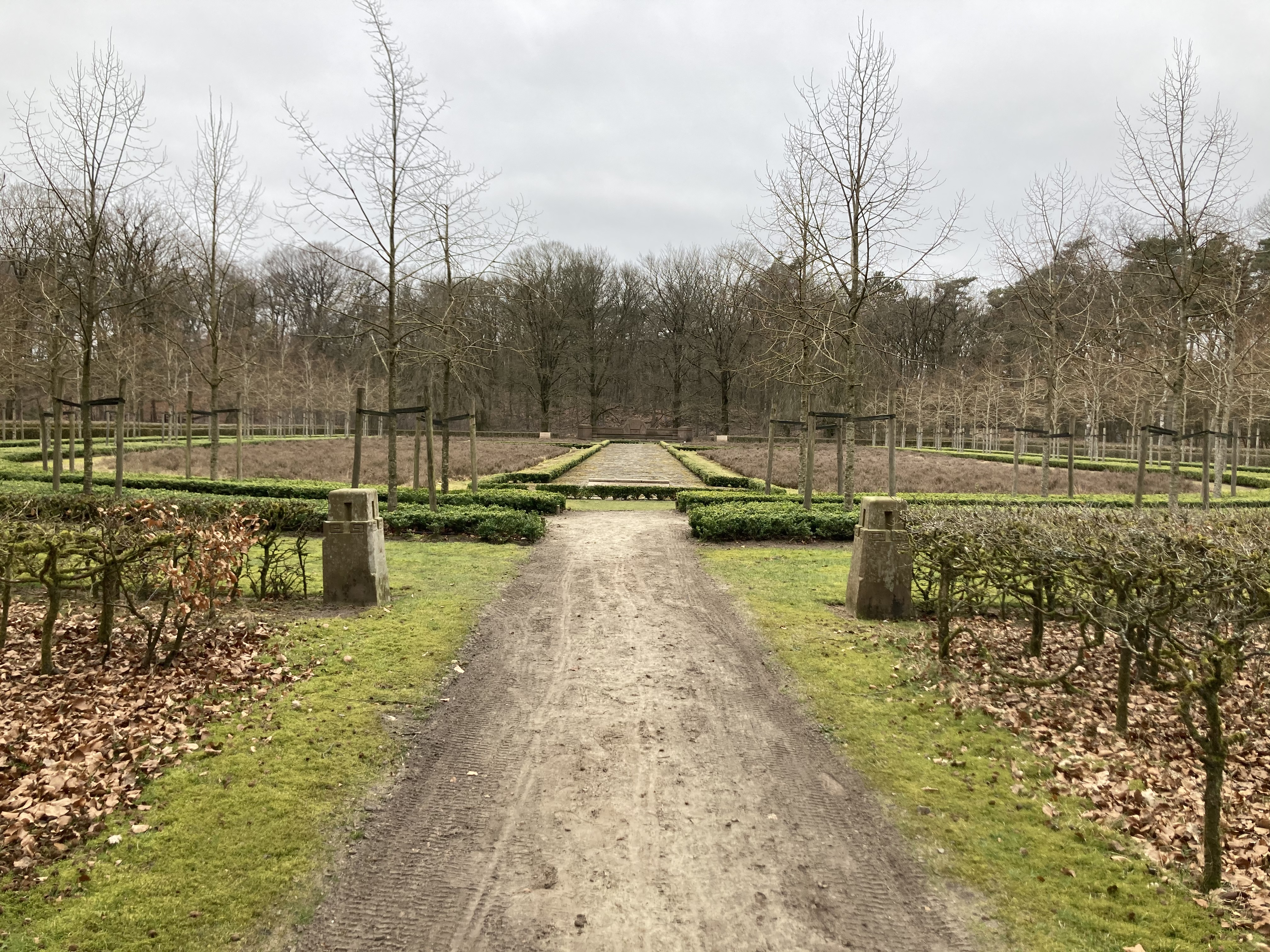
President Steynbank, a monument for President Steyn in Hoge Veluwe, Netherlands.

Afrikaner Bond

From early on, Steyn, along with many other prominent Freestaters, came under the influence of a German, Carl Borckenhagen, the editor of the Bloemfontein Express newspaper, and in 1881 he had joined Borckenhagen in founding the Afrikaner Bond.

Post-Union Political Legacy

In the Union of South Africa, he was a co-founder of the South African Party which he left in 1914 with James Barry Munnik Hertzog and Christiaan Rudolf de Wet to found the National Party.

The C&N Oranje Meisieskool

The Anglo-Boer War and the great loss of women and children was a driving force behind the origin of the C&N Oranje Meisieskool, an originally Dutch and now Afrikaans girls school, that was initiated by Steyn. The school opened its doors in 1907.

National Woman's Monument

The Vrouemonument, the first monument in the world dedicated to women and children, was unveiled on 16 December 1913 and was initiated by the ideals of Steyn and the family friend, Emily Hobhouse. The sculptor Anton van Wouw and the architect Frans Soff designed the monument.

University of the Free State

In December 1895, Steyn mentioned in his election speech that he would do everything possible to see to it that the children of the Orange Free State received a good education. He consulted with the Government (Volksraad) to devise a framework to uplift the standard of education to the same level of other wealthier states. Steyn believed that education would bring about unification between different groups in the Free State.

During his inauguration speech in 1896, President Steyn stated that his vision, with regards to educational facilities, for the city of Bloemfontein was a university where youth from all over the country could come and study.

The University of the Free State was established as a higher institute of learning in 1904.

== Descendants ==
Many of Steyn's descendants followed the family tradition of a career in politics or the legal profession.

Steyn's son, Dr. Colin Steyn, was a Minister of Justice and Minister of Employment in Jan Smuts' South African Party Cabinet.

Steyn's grandson, Marthinus Steyn - also known as Theunie - was a Judge in the South African Supreme Court of Appeal. He also served as Administrator-General of South-West Africa during its transition to the independent Republic of Namibia. During his tenure as Administrator-General, Theunie played an important role in instituting democratic reforms, including universal suffrage.

Another grandson of Steyn, Jan, was a partner and head of the Patent Department of Pretoria law firm Adams & Adams.

Steyn's great-grandsons, Theuns and Colin Steyn, practice as lawyers. Theuns is a partner and corporate lawyer at the law firm Edward Nathan Sonnenbergs (ENSafrica) in Cape Town. Colin is a senior public prosecutor in Bloemfontein. The former is married to South African High Court Judge Elize Steyn.

Steyn's great-great-granddaughter, Bonnie Steyn, is a partner at the Cape Town office of Bowmans law firm. Steyn's great-great-grandson, Marthinus (also known as Theunie), is a lawyer practising in Hong Kong.

Another of Steyn's great-grandsons, Theuns Stofberg, captained the Springbok Rugby Team of South Africa in 4 Test Matches from 1980 -1984 against South America, All Blacks of New Zealand and England.

Outside law and politics, Steyn's great-great-granddaughter, Martine, is a French-English translator and copywriter who lives and works between Cape Town and Paris, France. Steyn's granddaughter was the well-known South African actress Nerina Ferreira.

== Quote ==
"The nation of the Orange Free State stand ready for war in such circumstances where peace cannot be secured with honour, and although we recognize our shortcomings, our nation depend on the power of God to deliver us and secure us a victory. With a deep understanding of what we can expect when we place our trust in the Almighty, our nation will enter the war with courage and will fight until the bitter end to preserve the independence of our beloved fatherland"

- During an urgent government meeting on 26 September 1899 just before the outbreak of the 2nd Anglo-Boer War, Marthinus Theunis Steyn - regsman, staatsman en volksman, M.C.E. van Schoor, Protea Boekhuis Pretoria, p. 127
