= Pieter Jeremias Blignaut =

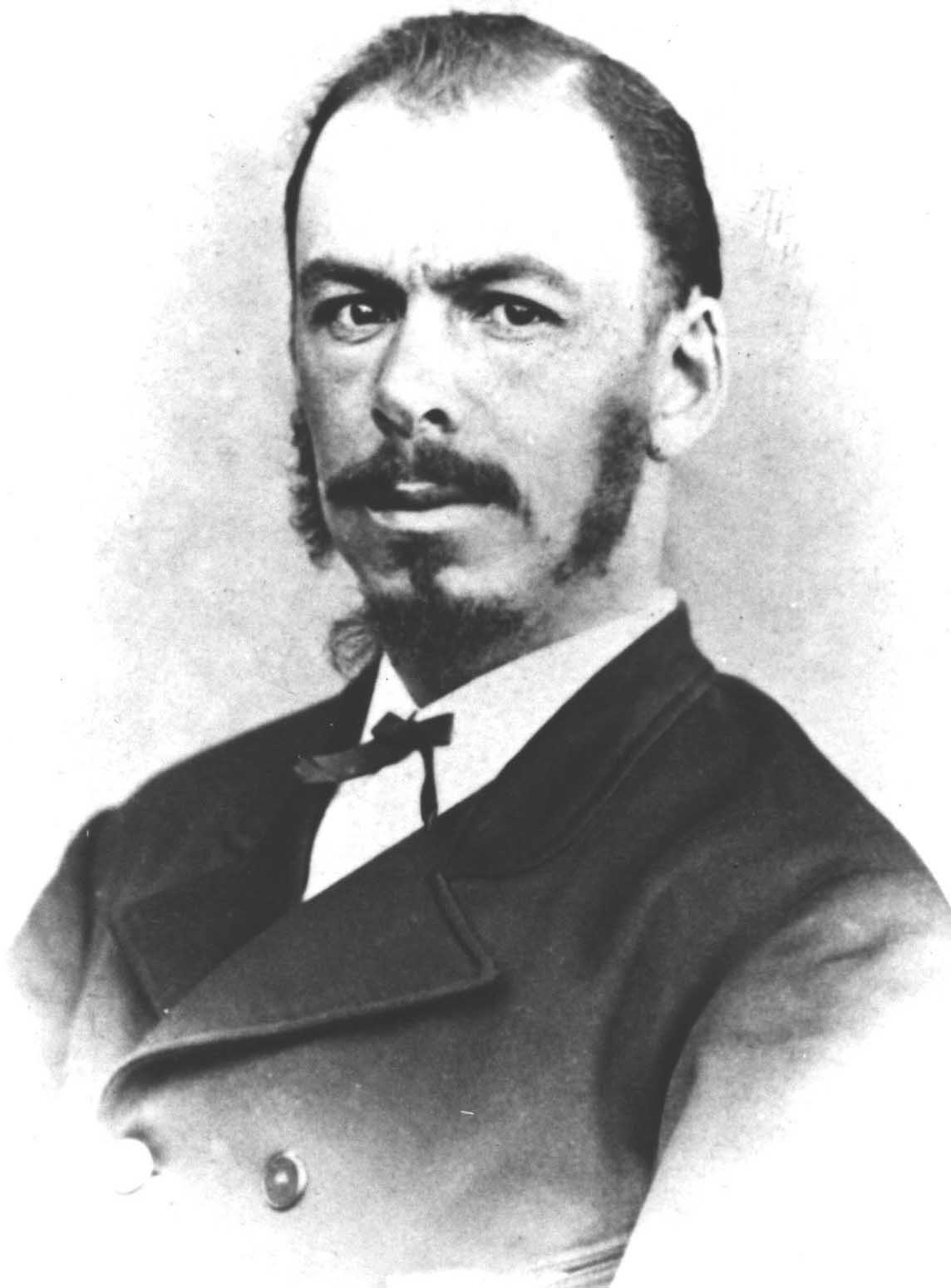

Government Secretary of the Orange Free State
- In office 20 May 1879 – 31 May 1902
- Preceded by: O.J. Truter (act.)
- Succeeded by: Office abolished

Acting State President of the Orange Free State
- In office 14 July 1888 – 10 January 1889
- Preceded by: J.H. Brand
- Succeeded by: F.W. Reitz
- In office 11 December 1895 – 4 March 1896
- Preceded by: F.W. Reitz
- Succeeded by: M.T. Steyn

Personal details
- Born: 26 August 1841 Paarl, Cape Colony
- Died: 1 November 1909 (aged 68) Bloemfontein, Orange River Colony
- Spouse(s): Caroline Erskine; C.J. Steyn
- Occupation: civil servant
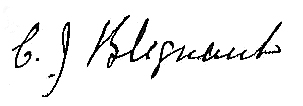
- Signature

Pieter Jeremias Blignaut (26 June 1841, in Paarl – 1 November 1909, in Bloemfontein) was a South African (Boer) civil servant, Government Secretary of the Orange Free State (1879–1902), and served twice as Acting State President, first after the death of President Brand (1888–1889), and again after the resignation of President Reitz in 1895–1896. After the conclusion of the South African War, Blignaut served as member of both the legislative council and the Legislative Assembly of the Orange River Colony. He was also a member of several state commissions.

== Biography ==
=== Family ===
Blignaut was a member from an old Cape family, the son of Johannes Jeremias Cornelis Blignaut and Johanna Emerentia de Villiers. He was named after his grandfather Pieter Jeremias Blignaut, a burgher of Stellenbosch, who married 25 October 1801 with Maria Dorothea de Villiers.

Blignaut himself was married twice, first with Caroline Erskine (1850 – 11 February 1883), and after her death with Ms. C.J. Steyn, sister of President Steyn. From his two marriages Blignaut had six children.

=== Early life and career ===
Blignaut went to the State School in his birthplace Paarl, where he subsequently attended the Gymnasium (Grammar School). After his exams Blignaut went to Cape Town, where he joined the colonial administration. In 1861 he passed the examination for the State Service Certificate of the Cape Colony and in 1862 he moved to the Orange Free State. Here he was appointed to the position of clerk to the Landdrost and Justice of the Peace of Philippolis (17 September 1862). At the time, civil, judicial, and military administration were still very much in the same hand. In view of Basotho threats, President Brand ordered the reorganisation of the Orange Free State defence, and the formulation of clear regulations for the different Volunteer Corps, which were administered by the Landdrosts' offices. For Philippolis Blignaut and J.G. Fraser attended the conference.

Blignaut held the position of clerk for four years, from 12 January 1865 working in that position in Fauresmith. Here he was promoted to Landdrost on 25 October 1866 and another four years later, on 28 September 1870 he was transferred to Kroonstad in the same position.

=== Government Secretary ===
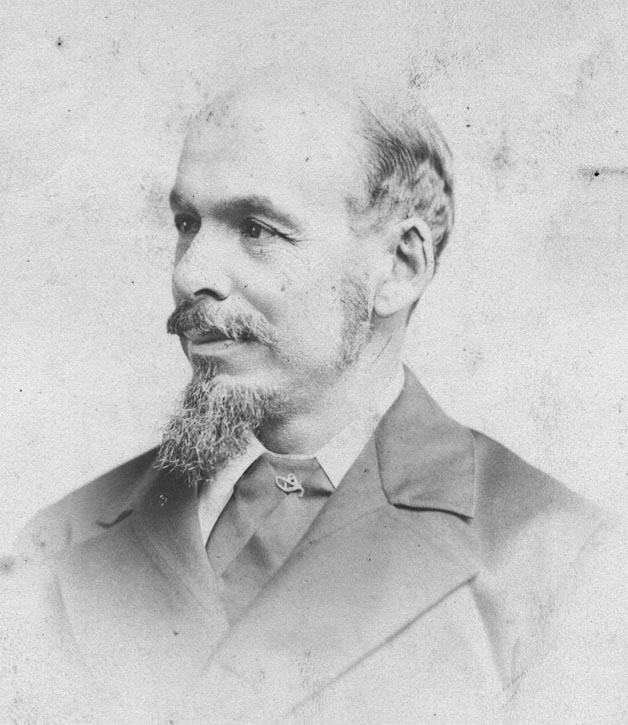
P.J. Blignaut, 1890s

When Government Secretary Höhne died in April 1879, Blignaut was asked to fill the position and was appointed as such by the State President on 20 May. Blignaut held the position of Government Secretary for twenty-one years, first through a period of growing economic prosperity for the country, and then through the South African War (Second Boer War). In both periods Blignaut showed himself an efficient and dedicated civil servant, with a keen eye for both home and foreign affairs. Already in 1880 Blignaut was entrusted with the difficult task of mediating between the British and the Transvaal. In later years Blignaut was regularly charged with difficult tasks.

Blignaut had a sociable and open personality, which made him popular with both the burghers of the Orange Free State and the civil servants, who showed their high regard at his 30-year jubilee, in 1892. Blignaut also had the full confidence of the Volksraad and the three State presidents he worked with. The length of his tenure made that he became one of the most knowledgeable persons in the Orange Free State where affairs of the state were concerned. In view of all these qualities, Blignaut was the natural candidate to fill the position of Acting State President when President Brand suddenly died in 1888 and after the unexpected resignation of President Reitz in 1895.

When war broke out in October 1899, and British troops stood to conquer Bloemfontein in March 1900, Blignaut organised the removal of the government to Kroonstad, including the state archives. Afterwards he stayed with the government in the field, moving from place to place. In January 1901, gravely ill, he was issued with a laissez-passer to travel to his farm Secretarispan near Bloemfontein, where he stayed for the remainder of the war, effectively on leave from his position as Government Secretary.

His wife, C.J. Steyn, was also active in the war. She set up a Ladies' Committee, initially to supply Boer prisoners of war with clothes, and later also to look after the welfare of the women and children in the British concentration camps.

=== British service ===
After the signing of the Treaty of Vereeniging on 31 May 1902, Blignaut quickly adapted to the new political situation. Where his counterpart in the South African Republic, State Secretary Reitz, signed the treaty, but on principle did not want to take the oath of allegiance to the British government, Blignaut did so without qualms within a week, on 6 June 1902. Perhaps his months of illness and contact with the British authorities during the last phase of the war influenced Blignaut's thinking about the future of the Orange Free State and his own position therein.

The British government almost immediately appointed Blignaut as member of the Central Repatriation Committee for the Orange River Colony, that was charged with the repatriation and resettlement of the thousands of Free Staters who had fled their homes, were incarcerated in concentration camps, and had been in the field to fight the war. The Central Repatriation Committee was part of the Treaty of Vereeniging. Privately, Blignaut pointed the administration of the Orange River Colony at the poverty and destitution of many white Free Staters, arranging for employment opportunities to be created for them.

In 1903 the British government appointed him to the legislative council of the colony, and in 1907 after the return to responsible government, Blignaut became a member of the Legislative Assembly. A better civil servant than politician, his impact on the proceedings of these two institutions was limited. His expertise was put to better use with his appointment as delegate to the South African Customs Conference of 1903 and as member of the Central Committee of the Conference of Landdrosts in Bloemfontein.

In 1909, while still working, Blignaut got septicaemia and despite a successful operation, he died the day after in his residence. He was a South African Freemason. He was buried in Bloemfontein with a Freemason's ceremony, conducted by the members of the Rising Star Lodge, of which he had been a member.
