= Willem Johannes Leyds =

Dutch lawyer and statesman (1859–1940)

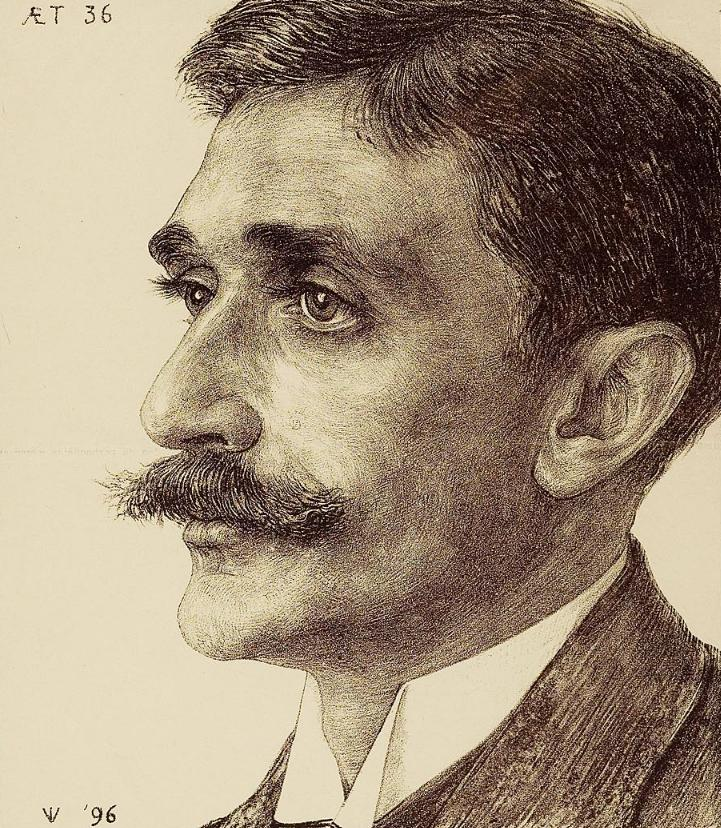
- Portrait by Jan Veth, 1896

State Secretary of the Transvaal
- In office 1 May 1889 – 31 May 1898
- President: Paul Kruger
- Preceded by: Willem Eduard Bok
- Succeeded by: Francis William Reitz

State Attorney of the Transvaal
- In office 13 October 1884 – 1 May 1889
- President: Paul Kruger
- Preceded by: Eduard Pieter Jorissen
- Succeeded by: Ewald Auguste Esselen

Personal details
- Born: Willem Johannes Leijds; 1 May 1859 Magelang, Dutch East Indies
- Died: 14 May 1940 (aged 81) The Hague, Netherlands
- Citizenship: Netherlands; South African Republic
- Spouses: Louise Roeff (m. 1884–1907); Anna Castens (m. 1910–1940)
- Education: University of Amsterdam
- Awards: Order of the Netherlands Lion; Order of the Red Eagle; Legion of Honour

Willem Johannes Leyds (1 May 1859 – 14 May 1940) was a Dutch lawyer and statesman who served as state attorney and state secretary of the South African Republic. From 1898 to 1902, during the crucial period of the Second Boer War, he was the Republic's special envoy and minister plenipotentiary in Brussels, accredited to several European states.

== Biography ==
=== Early life ===
Leyds was born in Magelang, then part of the Dutch East Indies, as the son of Dutch teachers. After the death of his father the family returned to the Netherlands. He studied law at the University of Amsterdam, where he excelled and from which he graduated cum laude.

He was recommended for the position of state attorney of the South African Republic to its president, Paul Kruger, by some of his previous lecturers. The president had been conducting a tour of Europe after his country's newly-reclaimed independence from the British, following the First Boer War. Though initially hesitant, Leyds accepted the offer, and he and his wife Louise moved to Pretoria.

=== South African Republic ===
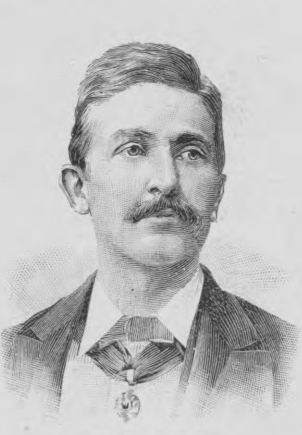

As state attorney of the Transvaal, Leyds was tasked with judicial cases of the republic, as well as the founding of the promising Netherlands–South African Railway Company. Leyds soon became the right-hand man of Kruger, and in 1888, he was promoted to state secretary of the booming republic.

Due to health problems relating to his throat, in 1896, Leyds travelled to Europe for treatment. After his return to Pretoria, he resigned as state secretary due to his recurring health troubles. He was succeeded in that capacity by Francis William Reitz, and returned to Europe to serve as envoy of the South African Republic in Brussels.

=== Return to Europe ===
During the Second Boer War, Leyds served as diplomat for the South African Republic, and attempted in vain to win support for the Boer cause. His diplomatic career came to a halt with the conclusion of hostilities, marked by the signing of the Treaty of Vereeniging.

He accompanied Paul Kruger's remains back to Pretoria in 1904, having died in Switzerland. After his return to The Hague, he authored a work on the history of the South African Republic. His wife Louise died at the age of 52 in 1907; he subsequently married the daughter of a Dutch official on the Dutch East Indies' island of Java, in 1910.

== Legacy ==
During his time as state secretary of the South African Republic, Leyds was awarded the Dutch Order of the Netherlands Lion, the German Order of the Red Eagle, and the French Legion of Honour.

For his contribution to South African history, Leyds was awarded honorary doctorates by the University of Pretoria and the University of Stellenbosch. Former Boer general and South African Prime Minister Jan Smuts described Leyds as the most significant figure in the history of Transvaal, second only to Kruger. The former gold rush town of Leydsdorp in Limpopo is named after him.
