= Dutch Corps Monument =

The Dutch Corps Monument is a provincial heritage site in Kliprivier in the KwaZulu-Natal, South Africa. It was designed by Gerard Moerdijk. (Note: The location is 28.40663°S 29.9532°E The coordinates given is for the turnoff from the main road, the monument is 5 km from this turn off on a dirt road.) The monument was vandalised in 2014.

In 1982, it was described in the Government Gazette as

This memorial, which was designed by G. Moerdyk of Pretoria, was built by the firm Barker and Nel of Volksrust and was erected by the citizens of The Netherlands in memory of members of the Dutch Corps who died during the battle of Elandslaagte on 21 October 1899.

== Gallery ==
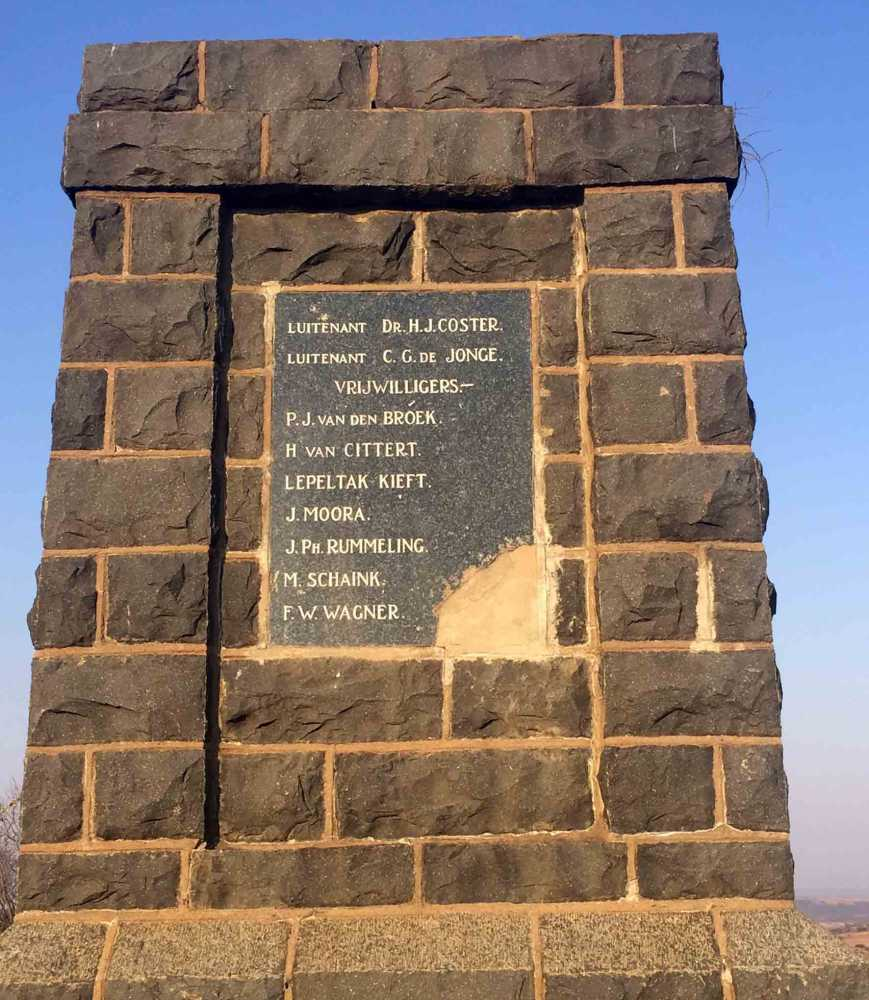
Monument to the members of the Hollanderkorps who died at the Battle of Elandslaagte before its destruction in 2014.

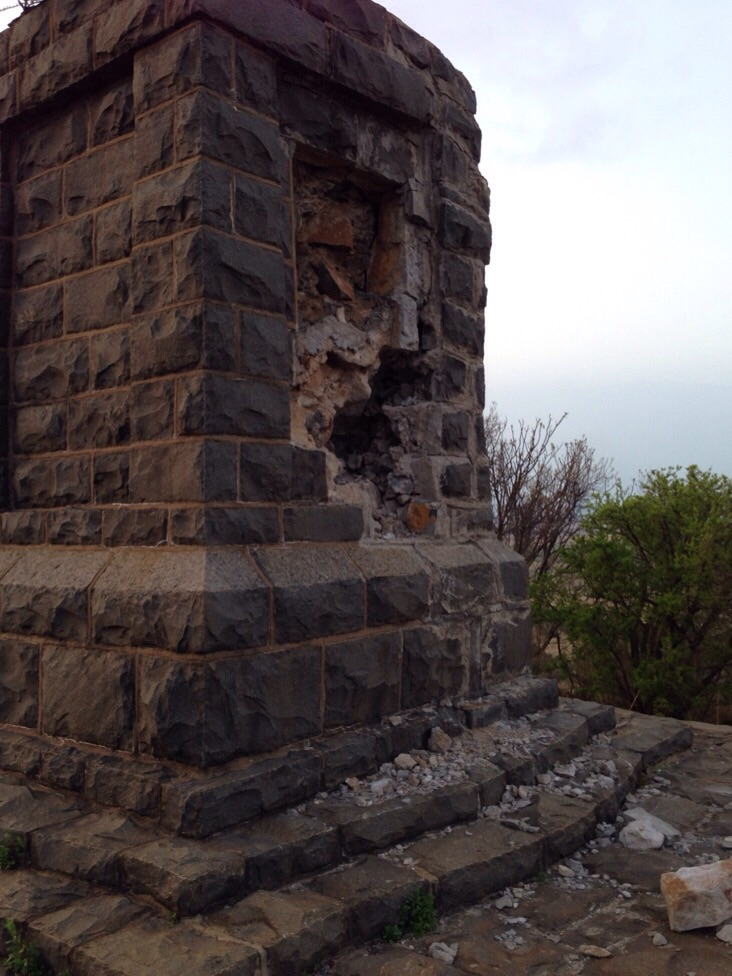
The monument after vandalism (photo Oct. 2014)

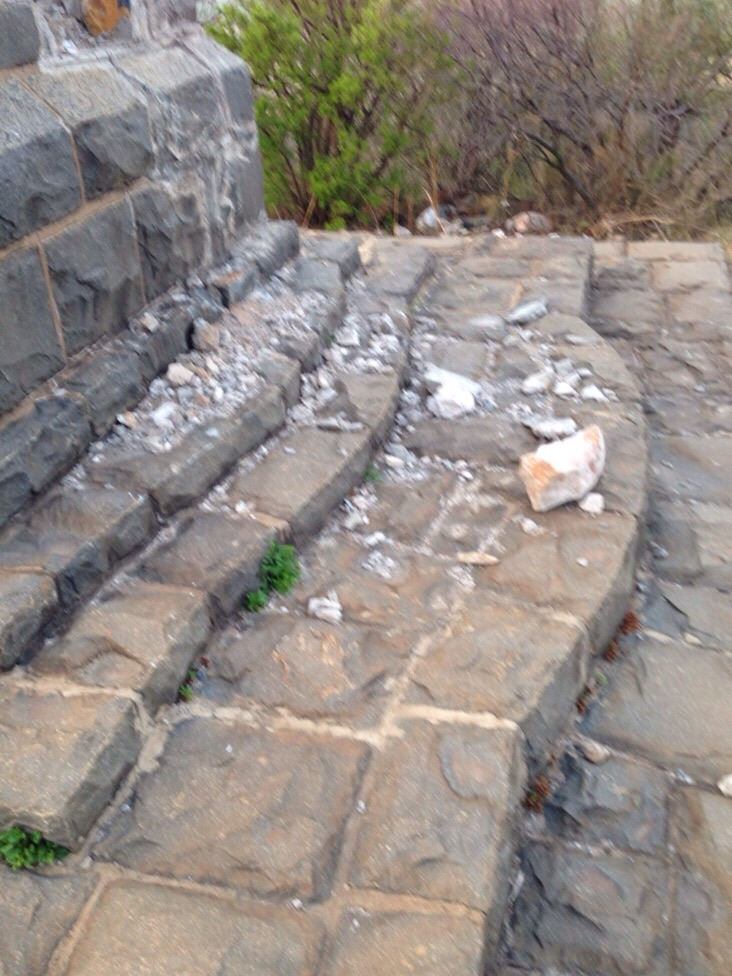

== See also ==
- Herman Coster a Dutch lawyer and State Attorney of the Zuid-Afrikaansche Republiek commemorated on the monument.
