= Willem Eduard Bok Jr. =

South African lawyer and statesman

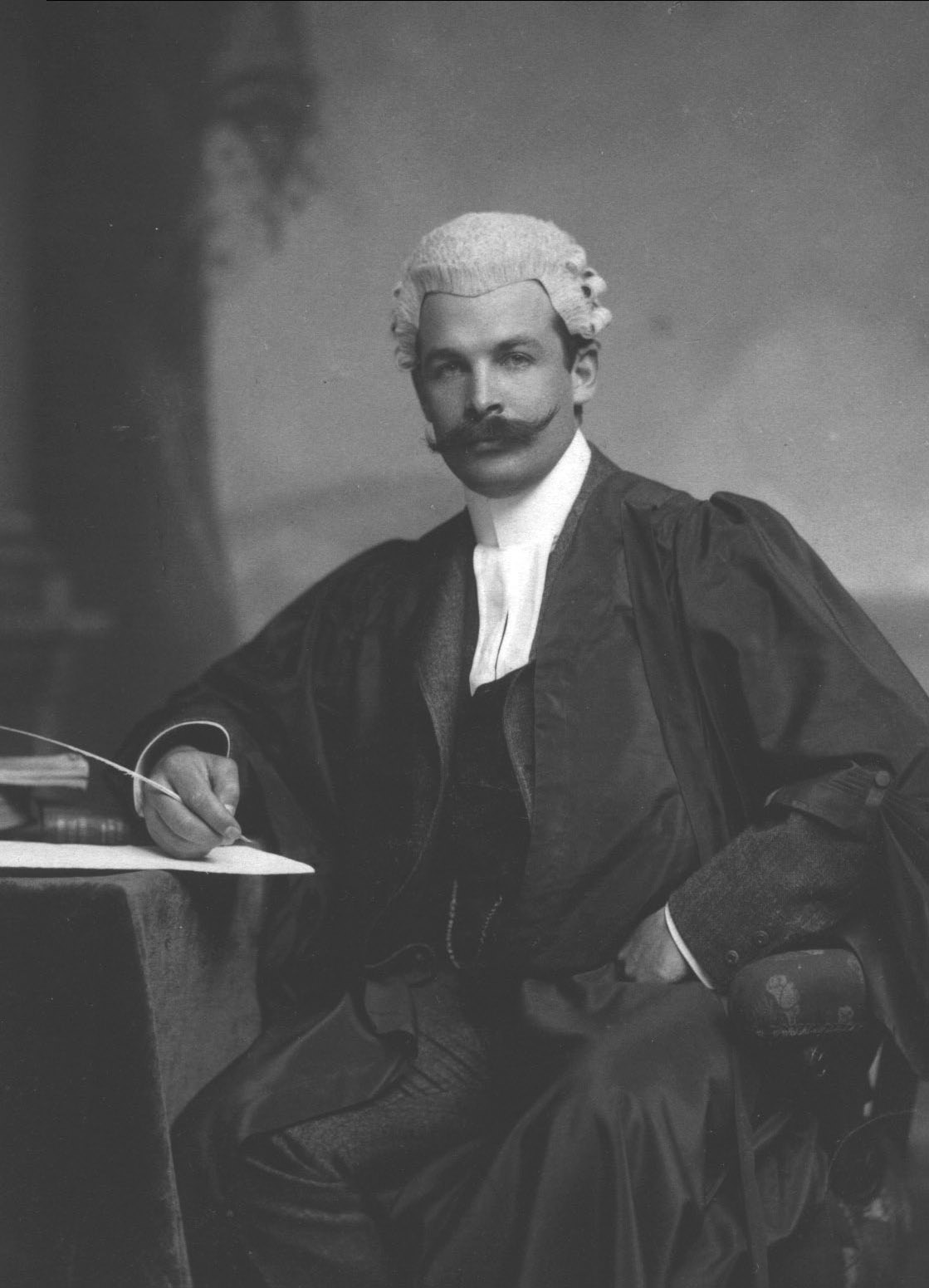
- Bok Jr. c. 1905

Justice of the Supreme Court of the Union of South Africa

Personal details
- Born: 1 January 1880 Pretoria, South African Republic
- Died: October 29, 1956 (aged 76) Pretoria, Union of South Africa
- Spouse: Maria Everdina Jacoba Kleyn
- Parent(s): Willem Eduard Bok; Martina Gerardina Johanna Eekhout
- Profession: Lawyer

Willem Eduard Bok, Jr. (1 January 1880 in Pretoria, South African Republic – 29 October 1956 in Pretoria, Union of South Africa) was a South African lawyer, statesman and judge of Dutch descent.

== Biography ==
=== Career ===
Bok studied law in England, before setting up a law practice in his home town of Pretoria. He was the private secretary of general Louis Botha. Later in life Bok became a justice of the Supreme Court of the Union of South Africa.

=== Family ===
Bok was the eldest son of Willem Eduard Bok (1846–1904), State Secretary of the South African Republic, and Martina Gerardina Johanna Eekhout (1856–1910).

He married in Pretoria 19 December 1907 with Maria Everdina Jacoba Kleyn (1880–1975), with whom he had four children.
