= Ewald Auguste Esselen =

South African barrister (1858–1918)

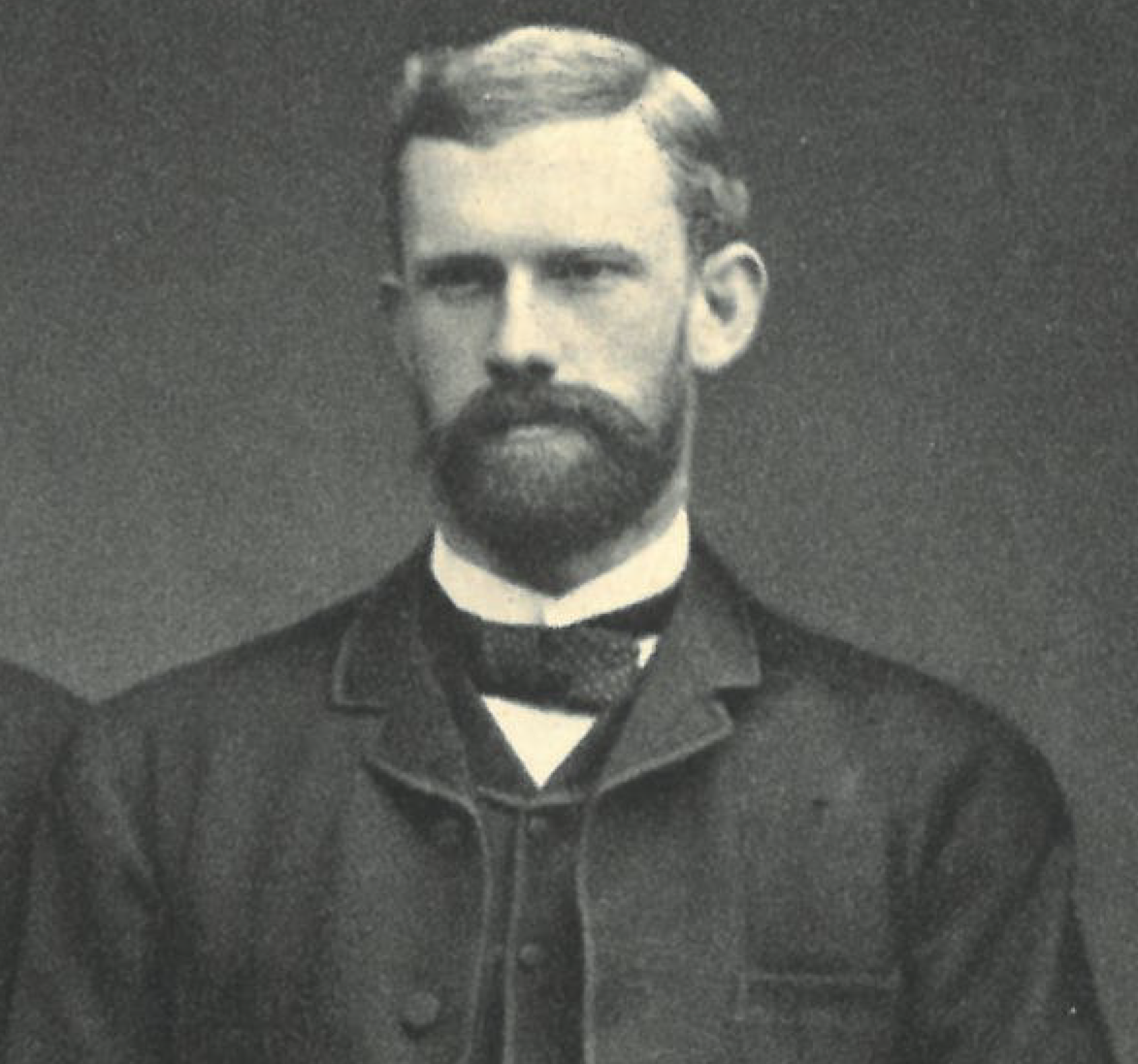
- Ewald Auguste Esselen, secretary to the Boer delegation at the London Convention (1884)

State Attorney of the South African Republic
- In office 1894–1895
- Succeeded by: Herman Coster

Personal details
- Born: 27 September 1858 Worcester, Cape Colony
- Died: 1 November 1918 (aged 59) Sea Point, Cape Town, Union of South Africa
- Education: University of Edinburgh, Inner Temple
- Profession: Barrister

Ewald Auguste Esselen (27 September 1858 – 1 November 1918) was a South African barrister who served as State Attorney of the South African Republic from 1894 to 1895.

== Biography ==
Ewald Auguste Esselen was born in Worcester in the Cape Colony in 1858. His father was L.F. Esselen and his family was descended from Rhenish missionaries.

After finishing school, Esselen studied medicine at the University of Edinburgh in Scotland. He returned to South Africa in 1881 during the First Boer War (1880–1881) where he served as private secretary for the then vice-president Paul Kruger. In this capacity he assisted Kruger during the Pretoria Convention which was negotiated in Newcastle in the Colony of Natal.

Following the peace he returned, on Kruger's advice, to Europe to continue his studies, this time studying law at the Inner Temple in London where he qualified as barrister. Between 1883 and 1884, he served as secretary of the Boer delegation to the London Convention which superseded the earlier Pretoria Convention.

After his return to South Africa he was admitted to the bar in Cape Town in 1885. In 1886, he was elected a member of the legislative assembly for Richmond in the Cape Colony. In 1887, he accepted the position of judge to the criminal court of the South African Republic which had been offered to him by Kruger the previous year. He held this position until 1890, when he resigned for personal reasons and became a barrister in Pretoria. He would later become a member of the Volksraad of the South African Republic, serving first in the lower chamber, and in 1893 in the upper chamber. In 1894, he was appointed to the position of State Attorney of the South African Republic but resigned after one year and returned to private practice.

In 1900, he was made prisoner of war during the South African War (1899–1902), but was released on parole to go to Europe. He returned to the now Transvaal Colony in 1902 and resumed his practice. After the war he maintained an active interest in politics, becoming one of the founders the Het Volk party which advocated for self-government.

Ewald Esselen died in 1918 at Sea Point in Cape Town and is buried in the Ou Begrafplaas in Pretoria.

== Legacy ==
Esselen Street in Sunnyside, Pretoria, was named after him until it was renamed Robert Sobukwe Street in 2012.

== Gallery ==
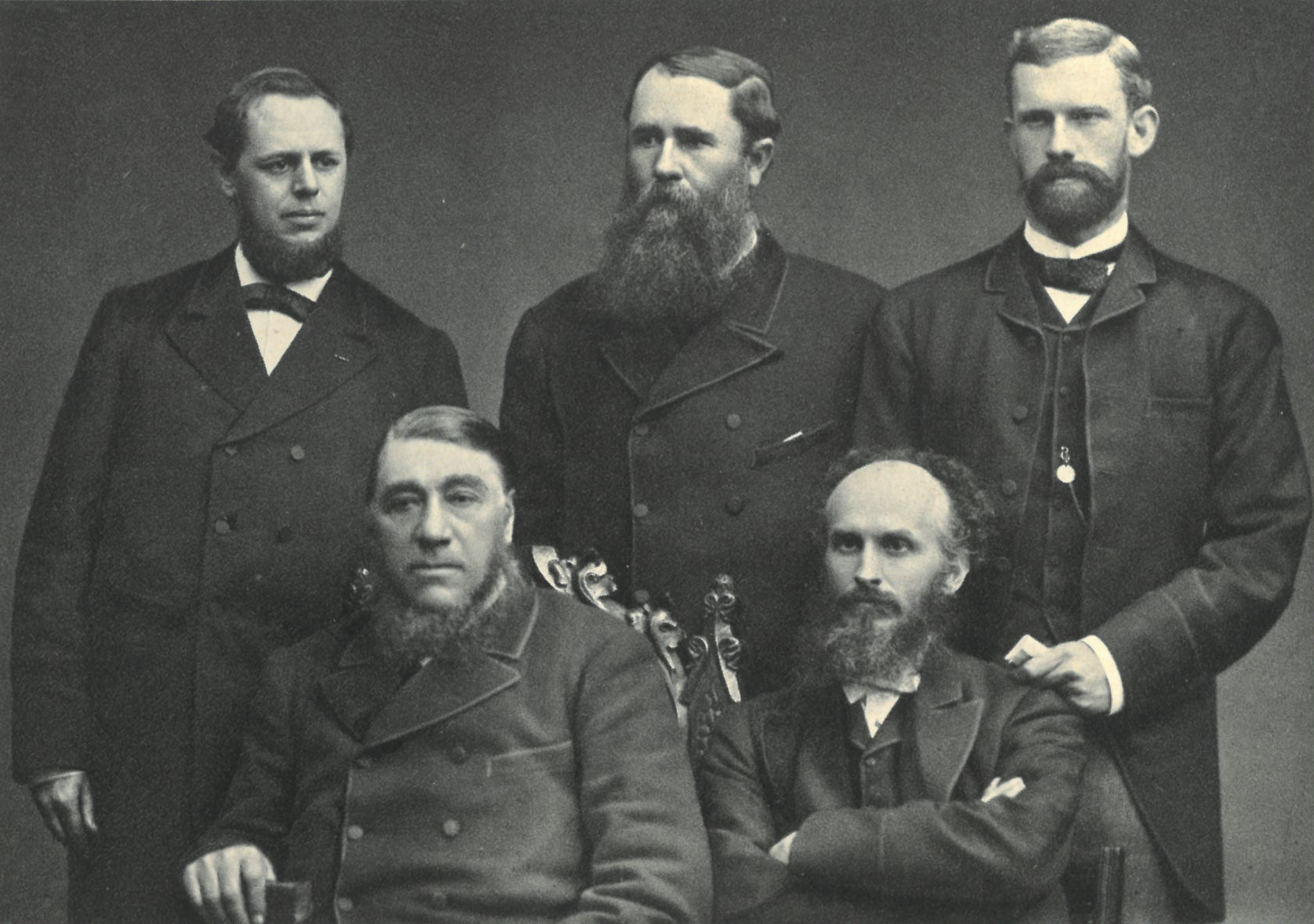
Delegates from the South African Republic to the London Convention (1884).
