= Francis William Reitz =

South African politician and statesman

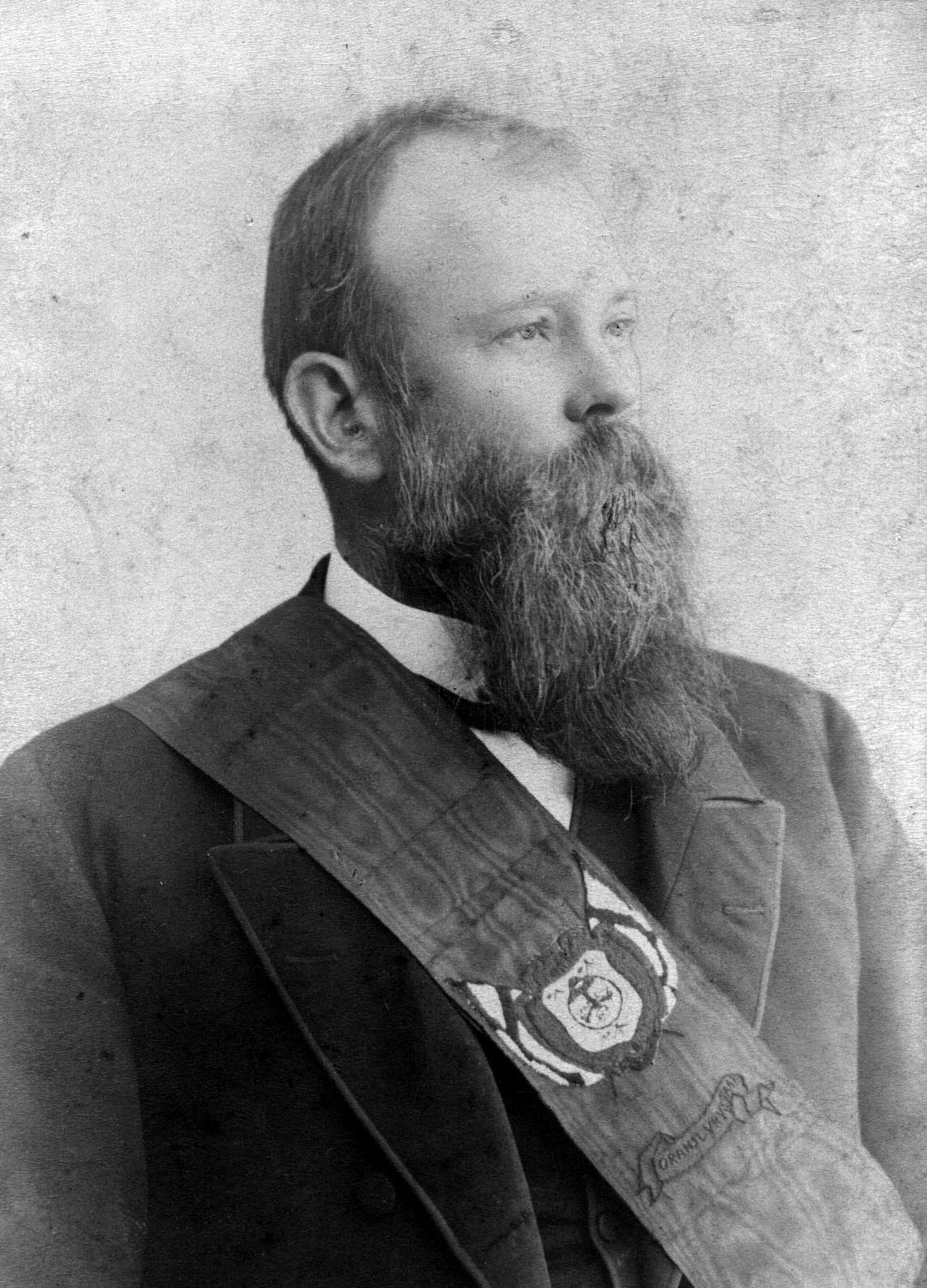

5th State President of the Orange Free State
- In office 10 January 1889 – 11 December 1895
- Preceded by: Johannes Brand
- Succeeded by: M.T. Steyn

Chief Justice of the Orange Free State
- In office June 1876 – 10 January 1889
- Preceded by: New office
- Succeeded by: Melius de Villiers

State Secretary of the South African Republic
- In office June 1898 – 31 May 1902
- Preceded by: W.J. Leyds
- Succeeded by: Office abolished

President of the Senate of the Union of South Africa
- In office 1910–1921
- Preceded by: New office
- Succeeded by: H.C. van Heerden

Personal details
- Born: 5 October 1844 Swellendam, Cape Colony
- Died: 27 March 1934 (aged 89) Cape Town, South Africa
- Spouse(s): Blanka Thesen (1854–1887); Cornelia Maria Theresa Mulder (1864–1935)
- Children: 15
- Education: South African College
- Profession: Lawyer

Francis William Reitz Jr. (5 October 1844 – 27 March 1934) was a South African lawyer, politician, statesman, publicist, and poet who was a member of parliament of the Cape Colony, Chief Justice and fifth State President of the Orange Free State, State Secretary of the South African Republic at the time of the Second Boer War, and the first president of the Senate of the Union of South Africa.

Reitz had an extremely varied political and judicial career that lasted for over forty-five years and spanned four separate political entities: the Cape Colony, the Orange Free State, the South African Republic, and the Union of South Africa. Trained as a lawyer in Cape Town and London, Reitz started off in law practice and diamond prospecting before being appointed Chief Justice of the Orange Free State. In the Orange Free State Reitz played an important role in the modernisation of the legal system and the state's administrative organisation. At the same time he was also prominent in public life, getting involved in the Afrikaner language and culture movement, and cultural life in general. He was a South African Freemason.

Reitz was a popular personality, both for his politics and his openness. When State President Brand suddenly died in 1888, Reitz won the presidential elections unopposed. After being re-elected in 1895, subsequently making a trip to Europe, Reitz fell seriously ill, and had to retire. In 1898, now recovered, he was appointed State Secretary of the South African Republic, and became a leading Afrikaner political figure during the Second Boer War. Reluctant to shift allegiance to the British, Reitz went into voluntary exile after the war ended. Several years later he returned to South Africa and set up a law practice again, in Pretoria. In the late 1900s he became involved in politics once more, and upon the declaration of the Union of South Africa in 1910, Reitz was chosen the first president of the Senate.

Reitz was an important figure in Afrikaner cultural life during most of his life, especially through his poems and other publications.

== Family ==
Francis William Reitz, Jr., was born in Swellendam on 5 October 1844, as the son of Francis William Reitz, Sr. MLC, model farmer and politician, and Cornelia Magdalena Deneys. He was the seventh child in a family of twelve. He grew up at Rhenosterfontein, the model farm (Afrikaans: plaas) of his father, situated on the borders of the Breederivier (Broad River) in the Cape Colony.

Reitz married twice. His first marriage (Cape Town 24 June 1874) was to Blanka Thesen (Stavanger, Norway, 15 October 1854 – Bloemfontein, 5 October 1887). She was the sister of Charles Wilhelm Thesen, and the daughter of Arnt Leonard Thesen, tradesman, and Anne Cathrine Margarethe Brandt. The Thesen family had settled in Knysna, Cape Colony, from Norway in 1869. The couple had seven sons and one daughter. After the death of his first wife Reitz remarried (Bloemfontein, 11 December 1889) with Cornelia Maria Theresia Mulder (Delft, Netherlands, 25 December 1863 – Cape Town 2 January 1935), daughter of Johannes Adrianus Mulder, typesetter, and Engelina Johanna van Hamme. At the time of her marriage Mulder was acting director of the Eunice Ladies' Institute at Bloemfontein. With his second wife he had six sons and one daughter.

Deneys, his son, fought against the British in the Second Boer War, commanded the First Battalion, Royal Scots Fusiliers during World War I and served as a Member of the Union Parliament, Cabinet Minister, Deputy Prime Minister (1939–1943), and South African High Commissioner (1944) to the Court of St. James's. His book, Commando: A Boer Journal of the Boer War, has for many years been regarded as one of the best narratives of war and adventure in the English language.

== Education ==
Reitz received his earliest schooling at home, from a governess, and at a neighbouring farm. When he was nine years old, he went to the Rouwkoop Boarding School in Rondebosch (Cape Town). Here he stood out for his academic achievements and was subsequently elected Queen's Scholar by the Senate of the South African College in Cape Town. In the six years he spent at the College, after arriving in 1857, he received a broad education in arts and sciences, and developed himself into a well-balanced young man with obvious leadership qualities. He graduated from South African College in September 1863 with the equivalent of a modern bachelor's degree in arts and sciences.

By then, Reitz had developed a keen interest in law, and he continued his studies at South African College, reading law with professor F.S. Watermeyer. The latter's death only months after Reitz started working with him, made Reitz decide to continue his studies in London, at the Inner Temple. It was a decision that needed deliberation, as his father was hoping for his son to return to the farm in due time, and the financial situation of the family was not strong. However, Reitz did go to London, and finished his studies successfully. He was called to the bar at Westminster on 11 June 1867. During his time in England Reitz became interested in politics, and regularly attended sessions of the House of Commons. Before returning to South Africa he made a tour of Europe. Back in South Africa, Reitz established himself as a barrister in Cape Town, where he was called to the bar on 23 January 1868.

== Early career ==
In the beginning Reitz found it hard to make a living, as competition among lawyers in Cape Town was quite severe at this time. Nevertheless, he succeeded in making a name for himself, due to his sharp legal mind and his social intelligence. Being part of the western Circuit Court of the Cape Colony gave him a lot of experience in a very short time. At the same time, Reitz nurtured his political interests by writing lead articles for the Cape Argus newspaper, for which he also reported on the proceedings of the Cape Parliament and acted as deputy editor. In 1870 Reitz moved his legal practice to Bloemfontein in the Orange Free State. The discovery of diamonds on the banks of the Vaal River, Reitz thought, would lead to a growth of legal work and enable him to set up a thriving practice. This was not to be, however, and after a few months Reitz left Bloemfontein to set up as a diamond prospector in Griqualand West, where he bought a small claim near Pniel from the Berlin Missionary Society. This enterprise also proved unsuccessful, and again after only a few months Reitz returned to Cape Town. This time, his Cape Town law practice was successful, ironically because of the British annexation of the Orange Free State diamondfields (1871) and the economic prosperity this emanated for the Cape Colony.

In 1873 Reitz was asked to represent the district of Beaufort West in the Cape Parliament. The day he took his seat, 30 May, his father, who was the representative for Swellendam, announced his retirement from the Assembly. As so many of Reitz's activities up to that point, his parliamentary career was short-lived. Only two months later, President Johannes Brand of the Orange Free State offered Reitz the position of chairman of the newly formed Appellate court of the Orange Free State, despite the fact that Reitz was not fully qualified (inter alia too young). Reitz refused the offer for this reason, but when another candidate also refused, Brand insisted on the nomination of Reitz, and convinced the Volksraad to appoint him.

== Judge and official of Orange Free State ==
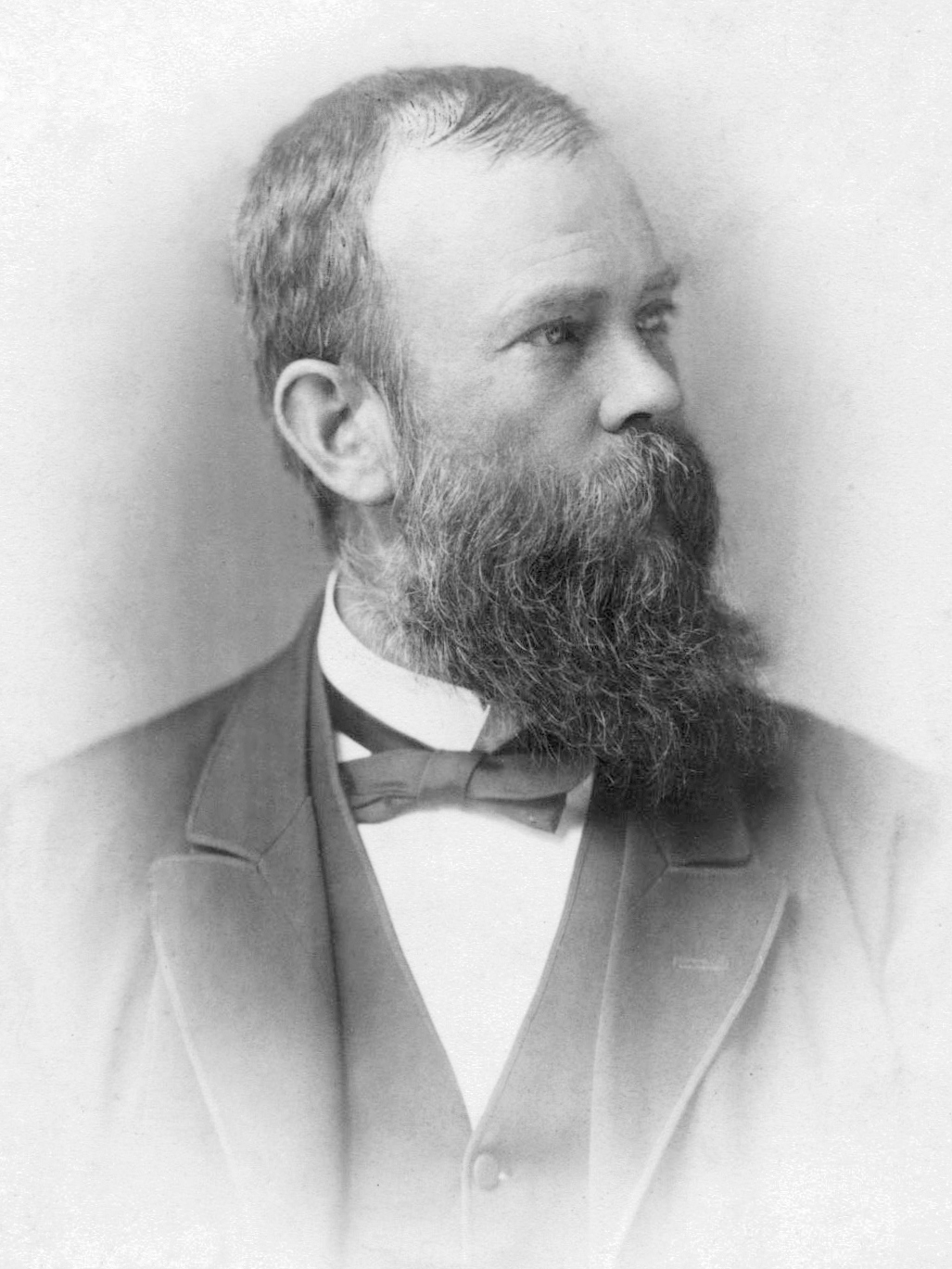
President F.W. Reitz of the Orange Free State, 1890

With his appointment to the judiciary of the Orange Free State, Reitz began one of the most prominent stretches of his career. His arrival – at almost thirty years old and recently married – in Bloemfontein in August 1874 was the start of a residency of twenty-one years. This appointment, and the greater publicity in brought him in the community, eventually led to his election as State President.

Before the mid-1870s, the judicial system of the Orange Free State was rather amateurish and haphazard in character, particularly because most of the judges were legally unqualified. Most of the judicial procedures were in the hands of district magistrates, the so-called Landdrosts, whose main task was administrative. Reitz's first task was to ameliorate this situation, which he did with much vigour. Well within his first year of tenure the Volksraad passed an Ordinance, in which both a professional Circuit Court and a Supreme court were called into being. Reitz became the first president of the Supreme court and consequently also the first Chief Justice of the Orange Free State. Right from the beginning Reitz showed himself to be a fighter, opposing the Volksraad on more than one occasion, tackling deeply ingrained political traditions that stood in the way of the modernisation of the judicial system, but also fighting hard to get the salaries and pensions of state officials improved. As a colonial – he was born in the Cape Colony after all – he had to win the confidence of the Boer population to have his ideas accepted. This he did by travelling with the Circuit Court through the country for over ten years, acquiring insight into and empathy for their way of life and their often conservative and always God-fearing beliefs. It helped that Reitz himself was a religious person and that he had started out in life in the Afrikaans speaking countryside of the Cape Colony. Eventually he became the symbol of Afrikanerdom for many Orange Free Staters.

Institutionally, Reitz did much for the codification and review of the laws of the Orange Free State. With his colleagues C.J. Vels, O.J. Truter, and J.G. Fraser Reitz published the first Ordonnantie boek van den Oranje Vrijstaat (Ordinance Book of the Orange Free State) in 1877, making the acts and ordinances of the republic available to the larger public. He also played a role in the revision of the constitution of the Orange Free State, with regard to articles on citizenship and the right to vote, was chairman of the examination committee for aspirant practitioners, and contributed to the improvement of the prison system and the district administration.

== State President of Orange Free State ==
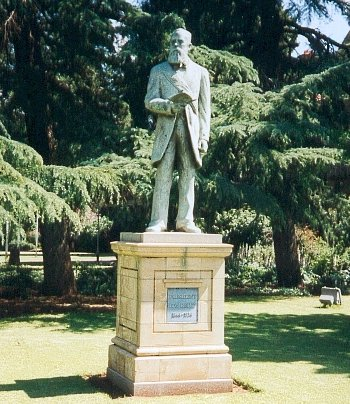
Statue of Francis William Reitz in Bloemfontein

Already in 1878, voices sounded for Reitz to run for the presidency, but President Brand's position was still very strong and Reitz openly praised his qualities and refused to stand against him. In the late 1870s and early 1880s the political temperature ran high in the Orange Free State. The annexation of the South African Republic (Transvaal) by the British in 1877 and the First Anglo-Boer War of 1880–1881 in which that republic regained its autonomy impacted deeply on political sentiments in the Orange Free State. On the one hand there were those who propagated caution in the relationship with the British, on the other there developed a political movement that strongly propagated a (reawakened) Afrikaner national consciousness. Reitz was part of the latter, and together with C.L.F. Borckenhagen, editor of the Bloemfontein Express newspaper, he wrote a constitution for the Afrikaner Bond (Afrikaner Union), a political party originally set up by leading Afrikaner politicians in the Cape Colony, like Rev S.J. du Toit and his Genootskap van Regte Afrikaners ('Society of True Afrikaners') and Jan Hendrik Hofmeyr and the Zuidafrikaansche Boeren Beschermings Vereeniging ('South African Boer Protection Association'). Among the supporters of this new Afrikaner nationalism in the Orange Free State was also Reitz's successor, M.T. Steyn, then still a young lawyer. The constitution was presented in April 1881, and several months later Reitz became the chairman of the Bond. His overt political activities earned Reitz criticism from those who feared a breakdown of relations with the British. It is obvious, however, that a wind of change was blowing through the Boer republics and among the Afrikaners in the Cape Colony, which was to change Anglo-Boer relations drastically.

In the Orange Free State President Brand was one of the politicians who held on to a more cautious and consolidating policy towards the British government at the Cape, maintaining strict neutrality. In this position Brand followed the habit of a lifetime, and it earned him a British knighthood. Despite the changing political climate and the polarisation of political positions, Brand remained hugely popular with the burghers of the Orange Free State. The presidential elections of 1883 could on content have become a political battle between the pan-Dutch Afrikaner Bond supporters and followers of the Brand-line. However, Reitz, as the ideal pan-Dutch candidate, again refused to stand against Brand. Only when Brand died in office five years later, the time was ripe for change. Reitz stood candidate and won a landslide victory on the ticket of Afrikaner nationalism. He was inaugurated as state president in the Tweetoringkerk (Two-Towers Church) in Bloemfontein on 10 January 1889.

As president Reitz was one of the first Afrikaners to actively develop a so-called Bantu policy, in philosophy and terminology going beyond contemporary ideas on segregation between white and black. Under his government Indian immigrants were by law forbidden to settle in the Orange Free State (1890). This led to a confrontation with the British government and an extensive correspondence between Reitz and the British high commissioner in Cape Town, in which internal sovereignty was claimed and established.

In economic terms, the late 1880s were a period of growth in the Orange Free State. Agriculture picked up, and the railway system became an important source of income as well. Reitz was instrumental in the modernisation of farming, propagating new techniques and a scientific approach to the prevention of plagues. Here Reitz showed himself the agriculturalist and model farmer his father had been before him.

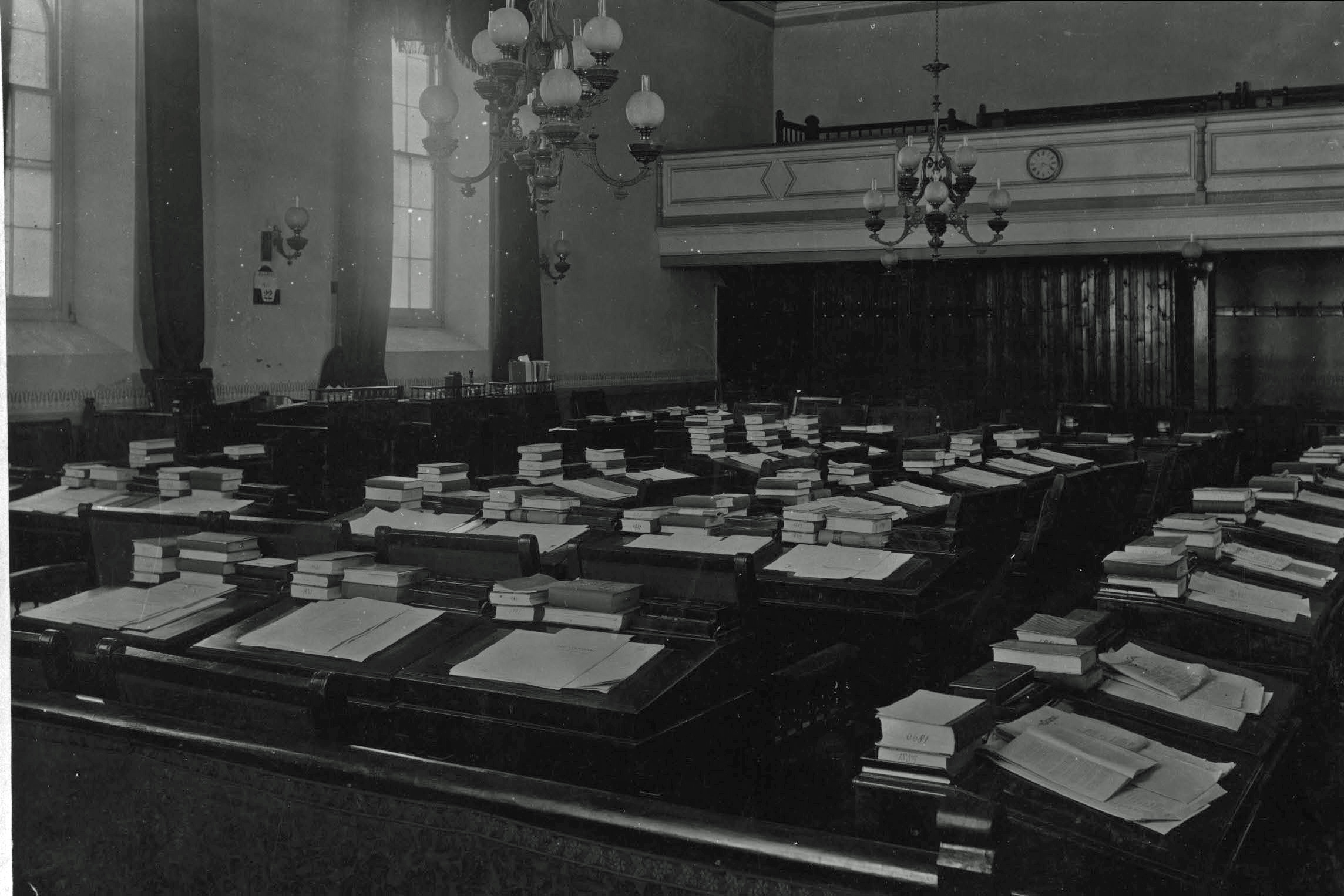
Third Council Hall (Derde Raadszaal) of the Volksraad of the Orange Free State, Bloemfontein, 1893, just before it was replaced by the Vierde Raadszaal

Under Reitz's presidency the new meeting hall for the Volksraad, the so-called Vierde Raadszaal (Fourth Council Hall) was opened (1893), and the new Government Building received a second floor (1895). Outside Bloemfontein the road network received attention.

As could be expected, immediately after he was inaugurated, Reitz contacted the government of the South African Republic with the objective to establish new and closer political ties. Already on 4 March 1889 the Orange Free State and the South African Republic concluded a treaty of common defence at Potchefstroom. Treaties about trade and the railways were to follow. Even earlier, in January 1889, the Volksraad charged Reitz to negotiate a customs treaty with both the British South African colonies and the South African Republic. On 20 March 1889 a Customs Conference was held in Bloemfontein which led to an agreement between the Orange Free State and the Cape Colony which was hugely beneficial for the former. The economic benefits grew further when new railway lines were opened between the Cape Colony and Bloemfontein (1890) and between Bloemfontein and Johannesburg (1892), directly connecting Cape Town with Johannesburg and turning the Orange Free State into a transit economy. For Reitz the development of a unified South African railway system was also a political goal: the railways as a means to diminish mutual distrust and create unity and mutual understanding between the white population of South Africa.

Reitz's policies were appreciated by the Volksraad, reflecting the change in the mood of the Afrikaner electorate towards Afrikaner nationalism. Months before the presidential election of 1893 the Volksraad endorsed Reitz's candidature with a vote of forty-three against eighteen. Reitz accepted the endorsement on the condition that he be allowed three months leave to Europe. On 22 November 1893 he was re-elected, again with a landslide majority.

The trip to Europe was far from just a family holiday. In Britain Reitz made some strong public statements, defending the republican system of government in South Africa and opposing British intervention in 'Bantu affairs'. On the continent Reitz was received by several heads of state and political leaders. In October 1894 he returned in Bloemfontein. Soon after Reitz was diagnosed with hepatitis, which moreover affected his already strained nerves and led to sleeplessness. The situation was so serious that he eventually had to resign the presidency. The Volksraad accepted his resignation on 11 December 1895.

In June 1896 Reitz travelled to Europe once more on a five-month trip to recover from his debilitating illness. On his return to South Africa he established himself in Pretoria in the South African Republic in July 1897, where he set up a new law practice.

== State Secretary of South African Republic ==
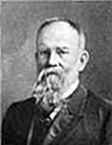
F.W. Reitz as State Secretary of the South African Republic and signatory to the Peace of Vereeniging, 1902

Reitz did not stay a private person for long because a conflict between the South African Republic legislature and judiciary resulted in the dismissal of the Chief Justice. Reitz then took up an appointment as judge in early 1898 and quickly became part of the inner circle of the Transvaal administration. At the time the relationship with the British was already rapidly deteriorating and the government of the South African Republic was taking action to reinforce its national and international position. One of the measures taken was to replace State Secretary W.J. Leyds, who had the Dutch nationality, with a South African. Leyds was appointed Envoy Extraordinary and Minister Plenipotentiary in Europe to represent the Republic abroad. Reitz took his place as State Secretary in June 1898, after Abraham Fischer had declined.

As State Secretary Reitz he was the most important member of the Executive Council (Uitvoerende Raad) after the State President. As the most senior civil servant he was responsible for the oversight over the implementation of the laws and regulations, as well as for all the correspondence of the President, official government reports, etc. He was also an intermediary between the Executive Council and parliament, the First and Second Volksraad, and a key figure in the foreign affairs of the State. Experienced and well organised as he himself was Reitz managed to quickly modernise the structure of the state apparatus, by implementing regulations for the running of the government departments, appointing an archivist for his own, and by prescribing that all correspondence with the government should be in Dutch.

The State President of the South African Republic, Paul Kruger, was not an easy man to work with, and in some circles it was predicted that Reitz would quickly find himself subordinated to Kruger. This was not the case, however. On occasion the two men clashed on matters of policy, but Reitz remained true to his own convictions, gaining some influence over Kruger in the process. Originally praised by the British for his diplomatic courtesy, their attitude quickly changed when they understood that Reitz was a protagonist of Transvaal independence. Reitz was sometimes rather brazen in his political statements, so when he claimed the South African Republic to be a fully sovereign state, the British jumped on him.

In view of rapidly mounting British pressure and an ensuing armed conflict over the position of the Uitlanders and economic control over the Witwatersrand gold fields, foreign policy in the South African Republic was eventually determined by a triumvirate: State President Kruger, State Secretary Reitz, and State Attorney General J.C. Smuts. During 1899 they decided that an offensive attitude towards British demands was the only way forward, despite the risks this entailed. Reitz sought and received the support of the Orange Free State for this approach. On 9 October 1899 the South African Republic and the Orange Free State issued a joint ultimatum to the British government to retract their demands.

The British government did not give in to the ultimatum, and two days later, on 11 October 1899, the Second Anglo-Boer War (South African War) broke out. When the British army marched on Pretoria in May 1900, the government was forced to flee the capital. From that moment on, Reitz was responsible for the continuous relocation of its seat throughout the Transvaal, which occurred sixty-two times until March 1902. In May of that year, Reitz took an active part in the peace negotiations with the British, and he was one of the signatories of the Treaty of Vereeniging, signed in Pretoria on 31 May 1902.

== Self-chosen exile and return to politics ==
Although instrumental in drafting the Treaty of Vereeniging, Reitz personally did not want to swear allegiance to the British government and chose to go into exile. On 4 July 1902, he left South Africa and joined his wife and children in the Netherlands. To alleviate his financial troubles, Reitz set out on a lecture tour in the United States. A waning interest in the Boer cause since the war was over made the tour fail and forced Reitz to return to the Netherlands. There, his health failed him again, leading to his hospitalisation and an extensive period of convalescing. He was then supported by his friends W.J. Leyds and H.P.N. Muller and the Nederlandsch Zuid-Afrikaansche Vereeniging (Dutch South-African Society).

In 1907, after the old Boer republics received self-government, and in the run-up to the formation of the Union of South Africa, leading Afrikaner politicians J.C. Smuts and L. Botha asked Reitz to return to South Africa and play a role in politics again. Together with his wife, he established himself in Sea Point, Cape Town. In 1910, already sixty-six years old, he was appointed president of the Senate of the newly formed Union of South Africa.

These were no easy years, again, as former Afrikaner compatriots found each other on two sides of the political fence, in a rapidly changing world. As in his earlier life, Reitz remained a man of outspoken convictions, which he aired freely. As such, he came into conflict with the Smuts government, and in 1920 he was not re-appointed as president of the Senate. He did remain a member of that House until 1929, however.

== Honours and death ==
As an important public figure, Reitz was honoured and remembered in different ways. In 1923, the University of Stellenbosch bestowed on him an honorary doctorate in law for his public services. Already in 1889, a village was named after him in the Orange Free State. In 1894 one also named a village after his second wife, Cornelia. A ship named after him, the President Reitz, sank off Port Elizabeth in 1947. The Jubilee Diamond, found in the Free State village of Jagersfontein in 1895 was originally named the Reitz Diamond, but renamed in honour of the sixtieth anniversary of the coronation of Queen Victoria in 1897.

When he finally retired from public life, Reitz moved to Gordon's Bay, but returned to Cape Town several years later, where he had a house in Tamboerskloof and was taken care of by his daughter Bessie, a medical doctor. He remained active to the end with writing and translating. Reitz died at his house Botuin on 27 March 1934, and received a state funeral three days later, with a funeral service at the Grote Kerk. He was buried at the Woltemade cemetery at Maitland.

== Cultural figure ==
Reitz was an important figure in Afrikaner cultural life. He was a poet and published many poems in Afrikaans, which made him a progenitor of the development of Afrikaans as a cultural language. As such he sympathised with the Genootskap van Regte Afrikaners (Society of Real Afrikaners), established in the Cape Colony in 1875. Although he never became a member himself, he was an active contributor to the society's journal, Die Suid-Afrikaansche Patriot. With his literary work, Reitz was solidly anchored in the so-called First Afrikaans Language Movement, although he was less interested in the didactic drive of that movement than in writing in Afrikaans as a purely cultural activity. Much of his work was based on English texts, which he translated, edited, and adapted. In the process he produced completely new works of art.

For Reitz, Afrikaans was predominantly a language of culture, not of government, where he propagated the use of the official language of the Boer republics, Dutch. During his presidency of the Orange Free State, where the use of English was significant among the burghers, he strongly promoted the use of Dutch, against politicians like John G. Fraser and others who were in favour of English.

Institutionally, Reitz promoted the foundation of the Letterkundige en Wetenschappelijke Vereeniging (Literary and Scientific Society) of the Orange Free State, of which he was chairman for a while, the library at Bloemfontein, and the National Museum of the Orange Free State.

== Bibliography ==
(List incomplete)

=== Afrikaans and Dutch language ===
- Reitz, F.W., Hoofregter Reitz over het barbaarsche patois (Paarl 1880).
- Reitz, F.W., 'De Taalkwestie', De Express and Zuid-Afrikaansch Tijdschrift, Sept. 1891.
- Reitz, F.W., 'De Hollandsche taal in Zuid-Afrika', De Zuid-Afrikaan, 13 March 1909.

=== Education ===
- Reitz, F.W., 'Opvoeding en onderwijs: een toespraak ... in het Victoria College, Stellenbosch op 15 Junie 1888', Zuid-Afrikaansch Tijdschrift (July 1888).

=== History ===
- Reitz, F.W., 'Schetsen uit die Oranje Vrijstaat', Zuid-Afrikaansch Tijdschrift (December 1890).
- Reitz, F.W., Brief van den heer F.W. Reitz ... aan den heer P.J. Blignaut ... (Dordrecht: Morks & Geuze [c. 1900]), 12p.
- Reitz, F.W. & M.T. Steyn, President Marthinus Theunis Steyn, Mannen en vrouwen van beteekenis in onze dagen 33 (Haarlem 1903).
- Hofmeyr, J.H. & F.W. Reitz, Het leven van Jan Hendrik Hofmeyr (Onze Jan) (Cape Town: Van de Sandt de Villiers 1913), xii, 666p.
- Hofmeyr, J.H. & F.W. Reitz, The life of Jan Hendrik Hofmeyr (Onze Jan) (Cape Town: Van de Sandt de Villiers 1913), xii, 666p.

==== Translations ====
- Reitz, F.W., translator of Jorissen, E.J.P., Transvaalsche herinneringen (Amsterdam 1897) as Reminiscences of a Transvaal judge. Never published, due to the outbreak of the South African War (Second Anglo-Boer War).
- Reitz, F.W., translator of Theal, G.M., Korte geschiedenis van Zuid-Afrika 1486–1835 (Cape Town 1891).

==== A Century of Wrong ====
At the advent of the South African War (Second Anglo-Boer War), F.W. Reitz, in his capacity of State Secretary of the South African Republic, published an overview of Anglo-Boer relations in the nineteenth century in Dutch, under the title Eene eeuw van onrecht. The book was an important propaganda document in the war.

The actual authorship of the book is unclear. The second Dutch edition of the book carried the text 'Op last van den staatssekretaris der Z.A.R., F.W. Reitz' ('By order of the State Secretary of the S.A.R., F.W. Reitz'). J.C. Smuts is indicated as author, but probably only edited the introduction and the end of the book, in co-operation with E. J. P. Jorissen. The rest of the text was probably prepared by J. de Villiers Roos.

In 1900, translations appeared in German and English. The English translation only carried the name of Reitz, and has a preface by W.T. Stead. The English edition contained more material than the original Dutch edition (see number of pages).

- Reitz, F.W., [J. de Villiers Roos, J.C. Smuts, E.J.P. Jorissen,] Eene eeuw van onrecht (Pretoria [1899]), 49p.
- Reitz, F.W., [J. de Villiers Roos, J.C. Smuts, E.J.P. Jorissen,] Ein Jahrhundert voller Unrecht: ein Rückblick auf die süd-afrikanische Politik Englands: autorisierte Uebersetzung aus dem Holländischen, veröffentlicht auf Veranlassung und unter Mitwirkung von F.W. Reitz (Berlin: Walther 1900), 96p.
- Reitz, F.W., [J. de Villiers Roos, J.C. Smuts, E.J.P. Jorissen,] Century of Wrong, Issued by F. W. Reitz ... With preface by W. T. Stead (London: Review of Reviews [1900]), xxiii, 152p.

=== Poetry ===
- Reitz, F.W., 'Klaas Gezwint en zijn paert', Het Volksblad 19 July 1870. [translation of Robert Burns, 'Tam O'Shanter's Ride']
- Reitz, F.W., Die steweltjies van Sannie', Het Volksblad 29 November 1873.
- Reitz, F.W., Klaas Gezwint en zijn paert and other songs and rijmpies of South Africa (Cape Town 1884)
- Reitz, F.W. (ed), Vijftig uitgesogte Afrikaansche gedigte (Cape Town 1888)
  [Fifty selected Afrikaner poems]
  Second edition: Sestig uitgesogte Afrikaansche gedigte (Cape Town 1897);
  Third edition: Twee-en-Sestig uitgesogte Afrikaansche gedigte (Cape Town 1898)
- Reitz, F.W., Oorlogs- en andere gedigte (Potchefstroom 1910, 1911)
  [War and other poems]
