= State Attorney of the Transvaal =

Principal legal officer of the Transvaal

Arms of the South African Republic

The State Attorney of the Transvaal was the principal legal officer of the Transvaal, or, as it was also known, the South African Republic.

== List of officeholders ==
No.	Portrait	Name (Birth–Death)	Tenure	Notes
1		Eduard Johan Pieter Jorissen (1829–1912)	1876–1877	
2		Willem Johannes Leyds (1859–1940)	1884–1888	
3		? Burgers	1888?–1894	
4		Ewald Auguste Esselen (1858–1918)	1894–1895	
5		Hermanus Jacobus Coster (1865–1899)	1895–1898	Later killed in the Battle of Elandslaagte of the Second Boer War.
6		Jan Christiaan Smuts (1870–1950)	1898–1902	

== See also ==
- State President of the South African Republic
- State Secretary of the South African Republic
