= State Secretary of the South African Republic =

Principal administrative officer of the Transvaal

Arms of the South African Republic

The State Secretary of the South African Republic (Transvaal) was the principal administrative officer of that Boer republic, officially known as the Zuid-Afrikaansche Republiek.

== List of officeholders ==
No.	Portrait	Name (Birth–Death)	Tenure	Notes
1		Willem Eduard Bok (1846–1904)	1880–1888	
2		Willem Johannes Leyds (1859–1940)	1888–1897	
–		Cornelis van Boeschoten (1845–1927)	1897	During extended visit of Leyds to Europe (April–July 1897).
2		Willem Johannes Leyds (1859–1940)	1897–1898	In view of the deteriorating relationship with the British, it was decided that it would politically be better to have an Afrikaner as State Secretary rather than a Dutchman, hence Reitz was appointed to the post. Leyds went to Europe as envoy of the South African Republic, a position he held until the end of the war.
3		Francis William Reitz (1844–1934)	1898–1902	Former State President of the Orange Free State. Retired from that position in 1896 due to ill-health.

== See also ==
- State President of the South African Republic
- State Attorney of the South African Republic

== Bibliography ==
- Marais, J. C. (1961). The Fall of Kruger's Republic. Oxford: Clarendon Press. OCLC 879210343.
