= Oloff Johannes Truter =

Landdrost of Kroonstad in the Orange Free State
- In office January 1862 – September 1870

Commissioner and Inspector General of the Gold Fields south of the Orange River
- In office September 1870 – January 1871
- Preceded by: New office
- Succeeded by: himself

Landdrost of Pniel
- In office January 1871 – November 1871
- Preceded by: New office
- Succeeded by: Abolished

Landdrost of Bloemfontein and member of the Executive Council of the Orange Free State
- In office November 1871 – 29 August 1881

Acting Government Secretary of the Orange Free State
- In office 19 April 1879 – 20 May 1879
- Preceded by: J.F.R. Kaufmann Höhne
- Succeeded by: P.J. Blignaut

Personal details
- Born: 7 August 1829; Cape Town
- Died: 29 August 1881 (aged 52); Koblenz, Germany
- Spouse: Sarah Hutchinson
- Occupation: Civil servant

Oloff Johannes Truter (Cape Town, 7 August 1829 – Koblenz, Germany, 29 August 1881) was a South African civil servant in the Orange Free State, miner, Landdrost and Acting Government Secretary.

== Biography ==
=== Family ===
Truter was the second son of Olof Johannes Truter, consul for the Netherlands in South Africa, and Catharina Geertruida Claris.

Truter was married to Sarah Hutchinson with whom he had three daughters.

=== Career ===
About Truter's younger years very little is known. In his early twenties he emigrated to the goldfields of Victoria in Australia. Seven years later, in 1859, Truter returned to South Africa where he entered public service. In 1861 the government of the Orange Free State made him Acting Landdrost of Kroonstad, an appointment that became definite a year later. Truter quickly made a political name for himself. In 1863, when State President Pretorius resigned his post, Truter was asked to stand in the elections. Eventually he resigned his candidature in favour of J.H. Brand, the candidate of the Volksraad.

In September 1870 the government appointed Truter Commissioner and Inspector General for the diamond fields south of the Orange River. Five months later the appointment was converted into a regular district (Pniel) and Truter became Landdrost. This was in the aftermath of the Conference of Nooitgedacht concerning ownership of the diamond fields around Kimberley and Truter was chosen for the job because of his political experience and negotiation skills. Despite his diligence and the trust he received from the diggers, Truter could not avoid that the British annexed the area as Griqualand West by proclamation of 27 October 1871. On 4 November the diamond fields were occupied by British armed police. The British governor of the Cape Colony Sir Henry Barkly, requested Truter to stay in function, but he refused.

On 21 July 1872 the government appointed Truter Landdrost of Bloemfontein in which position he was also an official member of the Executive Council (Uitvoerende Raad) of the republic. In 1879 Truter was temporarily appointed Government Secretary, after the sudden death of the incumbent F. Kaufmann Höhne on 19 April of that year. Truter only held the job for a month, as President Brand appointed P.J. Blignaut to the job almost immediately and the Volksraad confirmed the appointment on 20 May 1879. Truter stayed in his old job. In 1881 he went on sick-leave to Europe where he died.

In the 1870s, while living in Bloemfontein, Truter developed a lively interest in farming. He became a member of the Orange Free State Agricultural Society and assisted in the organisation of the first Agricultural Exhibition in Bloemfontein in 1875.
