= Willem Eduard Bok =

Dutch-born South African Boer politician

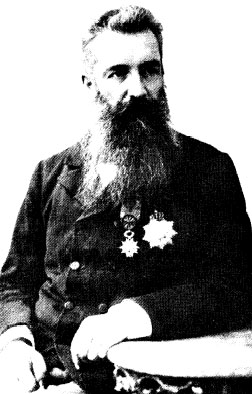

State Secretary of the South African Republic
- In office 1880–1889
- Preceded by: New office
- Succeeded by: W.J. Leyds

Government Commissioner at Johannesburg
- Preceded by: New office

Personal details
- Born: 28 June 1846 Den Burg, Texel, Netherlands
- Died: 1 November 1904 (aged 58) Johannesburg, Transvaal Colony
- Spouse: Martina Gerardina Johanna Eekhout
- Children: 5, including Willem Eduard Bok Jr.
- Occupation: Merchant, civil servant

Willem Eduard Bok, also known as W. Eduard Bok (Den Burg, Texel, Netherlands, 28 June 1846 – Johannesburg, Transvaal Colony, 1 November 1904) was a Dutch-born South African Boer politician, civil servant and statesman, who served as first State Secretary of the South African Republic (Transvaal) from 1880 to 1889.

== Biography ==
=== Career ===
Bok started his career as sales-agent in Zaandam, Netherlands. In 1876 he moved to Pretoria, where he gained the confidence of Paul Kruger and Piet Joubert and acted as their secretary during negotiations about the position of the Transvaal in 1877–1878. At the declaration of independence he became the first State Secretary of the South African Republic, a position he would hold for almost a decade. Afterwards he was appointed Government Commissioner in Johannesburg.

In his capacity as State Secretary Bok registered the gold claims in the East Rand area of the Transvaal. The town of Boksburg outside Johannesburg was named after him. Bok Street in the Johannesburg CBD is named after him.

Bok was decorated by the French Republic with a knighthood in the Legion of Honour and by the Portuguese government with a knighthood in the Order of Our Lady of Immaculate Conception of Vila Viçosa.

=== Family ===
Bok married Pretoria 23 December 1878 with Martina Gerardina Johanna Eekhout (1856-1910), with whom he had five children. His eldest son and namesake Willem Eduard Bok, Jr. studied law and became a justice in the Supreme Court of the Union of South Africa.
