= Herman Coster =

Dutch lawyer and State Attorney of the Zuid-Afrikaansche Republiek

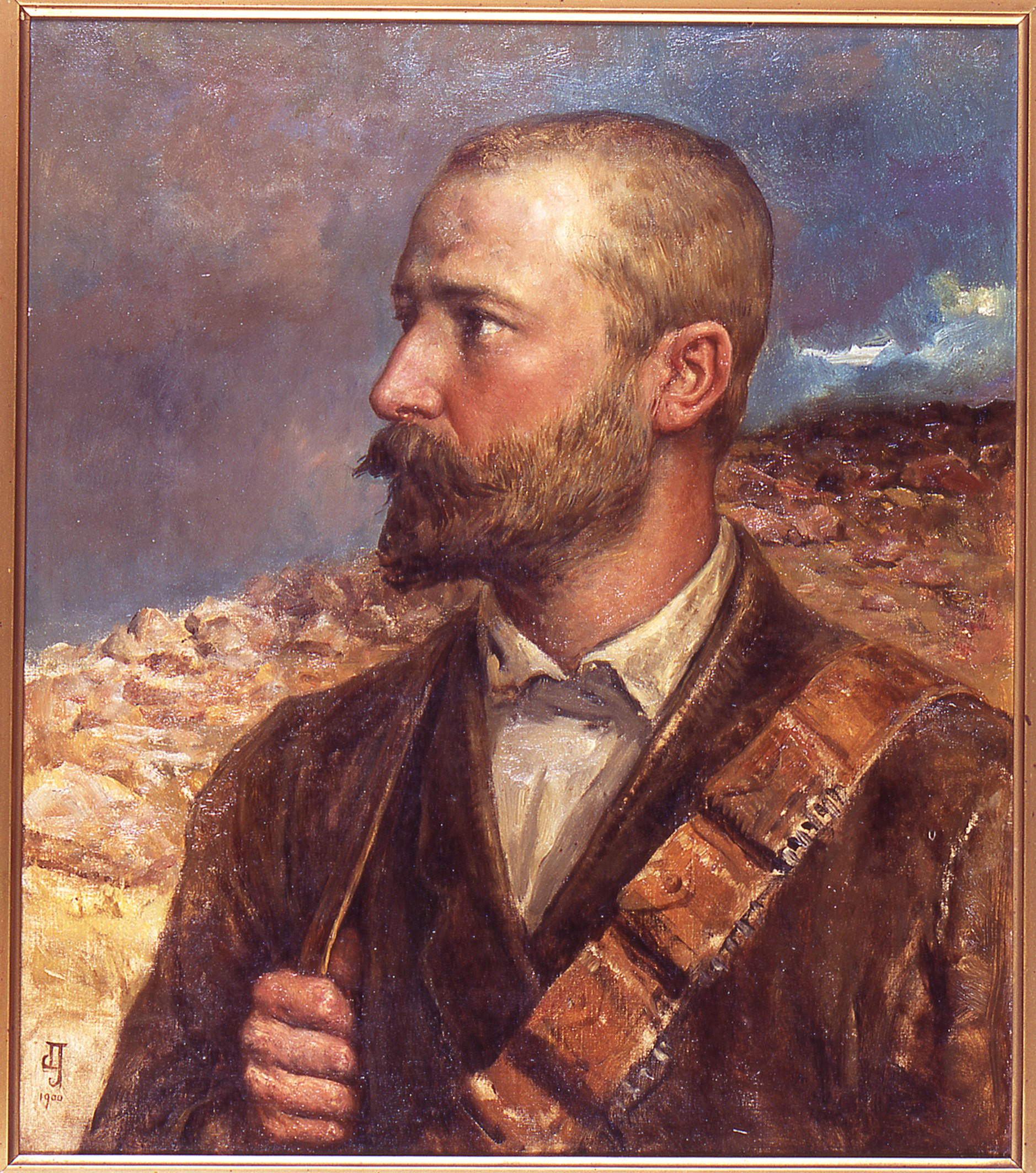
- Born: Hermanus Jacob Coster; June 30, 1865; Alkmaar, Netherlands
- Died: October 21, 1899 (aged 34); Elandslaagte, South African Republic
- Cause of death: Killed in action
- Burial place: Church Street Cemetery, Pretoria, South Africa
- Occupation: State Attorney of the Zuid-Afrikaansche Republiek

Hermanus 'Herman' Jacobus Coster (30 June 1865 – 21 October 1899) was a Dutch lawyer and State Attorney of the Zuid-Afrikaansche Republiek.

== Biography ==
Herman Coster was born on 30 June 1865 in Alkmaar in the Netherlands. He went to school at the H.B.S. in Alkmaar, and the Stedelijk Gymnasium in Leiden. After, he studied law at the Leiden University, where he became president of the student corps. His uncle, a Hague-based doctor, T.H. Blom Coster, was the patron of his studies. As a student, Herman Coster sympathized with the Young Flemish Movement. He completed his PhD in 1890 writing his thesis on Public Voluntary Auctions.

He moved to the South African Republic after his family experienced bankruptcy. There he became a lawyer, and between 1895 and 1897, at the request of President Paul Kruger, he served as state attorney. After Kruger insulted the 'Hollanders', Coster resigned his position and returned to working as a lawyer.

During the South African War (1899–1902), Coster joined the Hollanderkorps: a voluntary unit of Boer foreign volunteers consisting of 130 men and which had been established a mere month earlier. The Battle of Elandslaagte was both the first and last battle that the Corps participated in. Coster, then a lieutenant, was killed at the Battle of Elandslaagte, along with fellow officer Cars Geerts de Jonge and seven soldiers: P.J. van den Broek, H. van Cittert, J.A. Lepeltak Kieft, Jan Moora, J.Th. Rummeling, M. Schaink, and F.W. Wagner. Another 35 of others were taken prisoner, among them Willem Frederik Mondriaan (brother of the Dutch artist Piet Mondrian). The names of the deceased, including Coster, were inscribed at a monument at the location of the battle. The monument was destroyed by vandals in 2014.

After his death, Coster was lauded as a hero in the Netherlands and several hagiographies were published. In 1900 the Herman Coster Fund was established in Leiden for Afrikaans and Dutch students. In November 1901 a plaque commemorating Coster was added to the Leiden Academiegebouw.

Hermanus Coster Street in The Hague was named after Coster in 1904. This street is located in the Transvaal neighbourhood of The Hague that was established at this time. In 1915 the name was changed to Herman Coster Street. Today this is the location of the Haagse Markt. Another Herman Coster Street is located nearby in Wassenaar. Coster's hometown of Alkmaar also has a street named after him. There are also streets named after Coster in the Transvaal neighbourhoods of Leeuwarden and Rotterdam, as well as in Pretoria in South Africa.

Coster and the Hollanderkorps were featured as part of the exhibition 'Good Hope: South Africa and the Netherlands from 1600' held at the Rijksmuseum in Amsterdam in 2017.

== Gallery ==
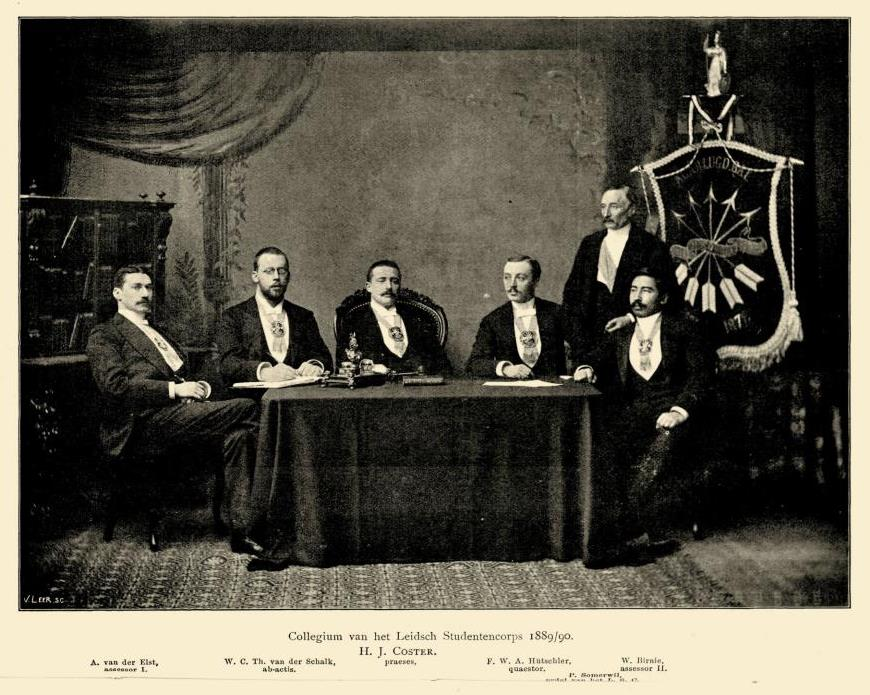
Collegium of the Leiden Student corps, 1899–1890. Herman Coster is in the centre.

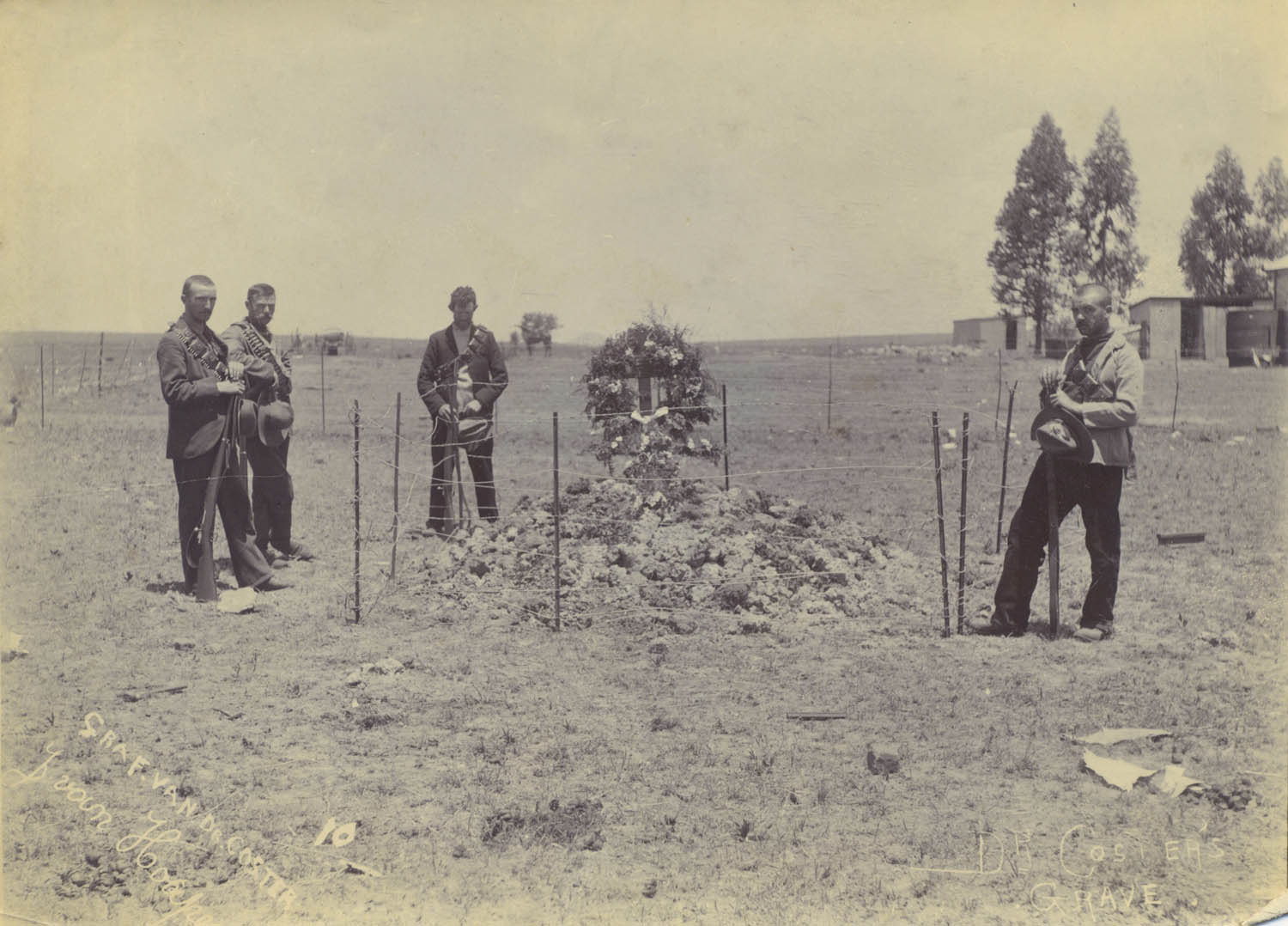
Grave of Herman Coster, Battle of Elandslaagte (1899), South Africa. Unknown photographer, probably around 1899.

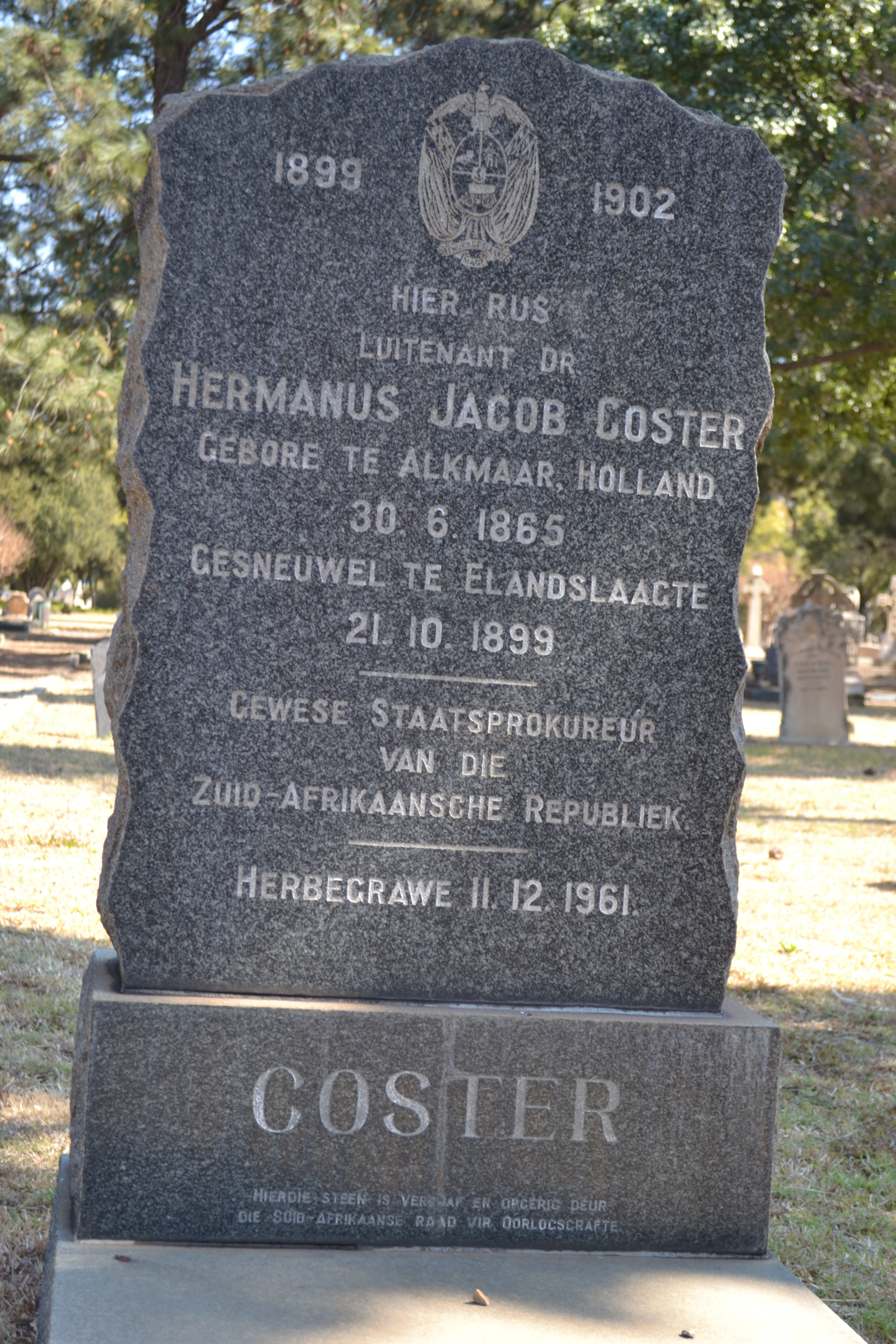
Gravestone of Hermanus Jacob Coster, State Attorney at Church Street Cemetery in Pretoria.

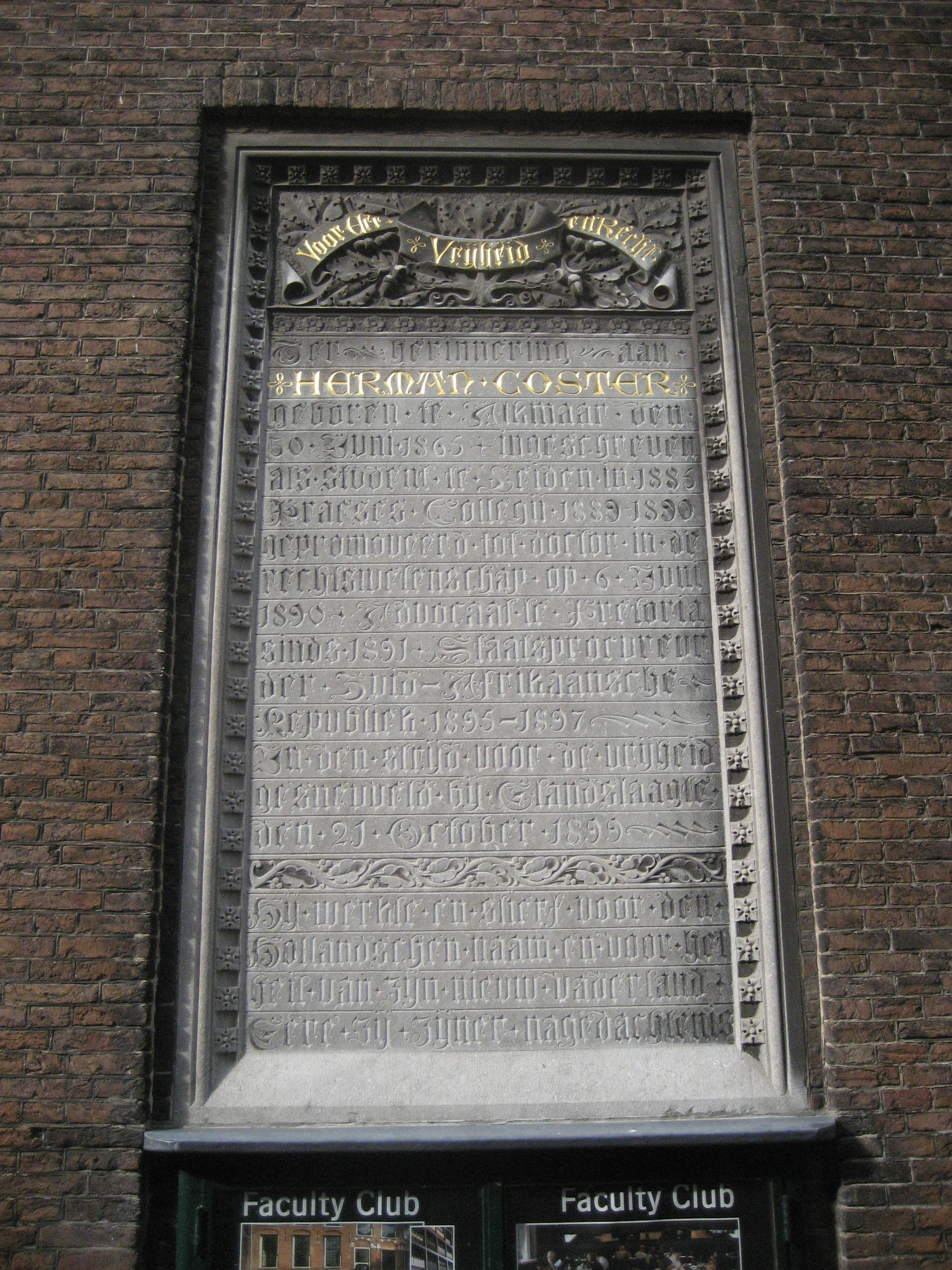
Plaque at Academiegebouw, Leiden University, commemorating the death of Leiden alumnus Herman Coster at Elandslaagte (South African Republic) in 1899.

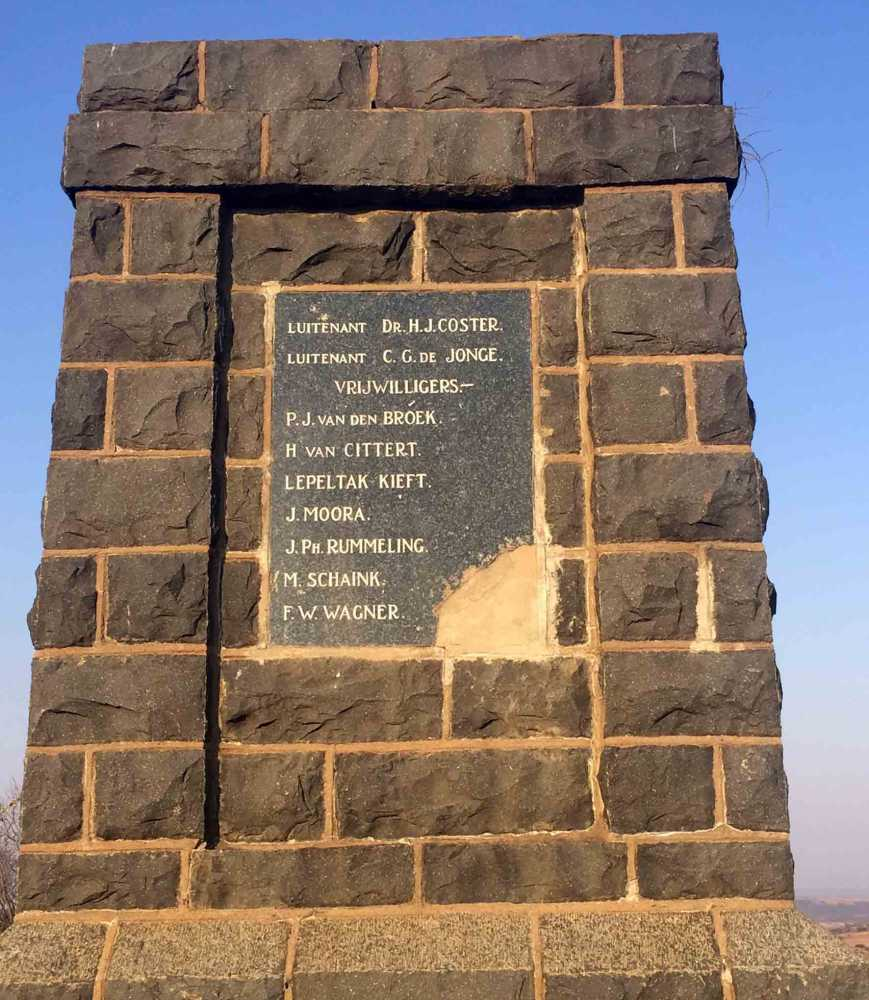
Hollanderkorps Memorial at Elandslaagte before its destruction in 2014.

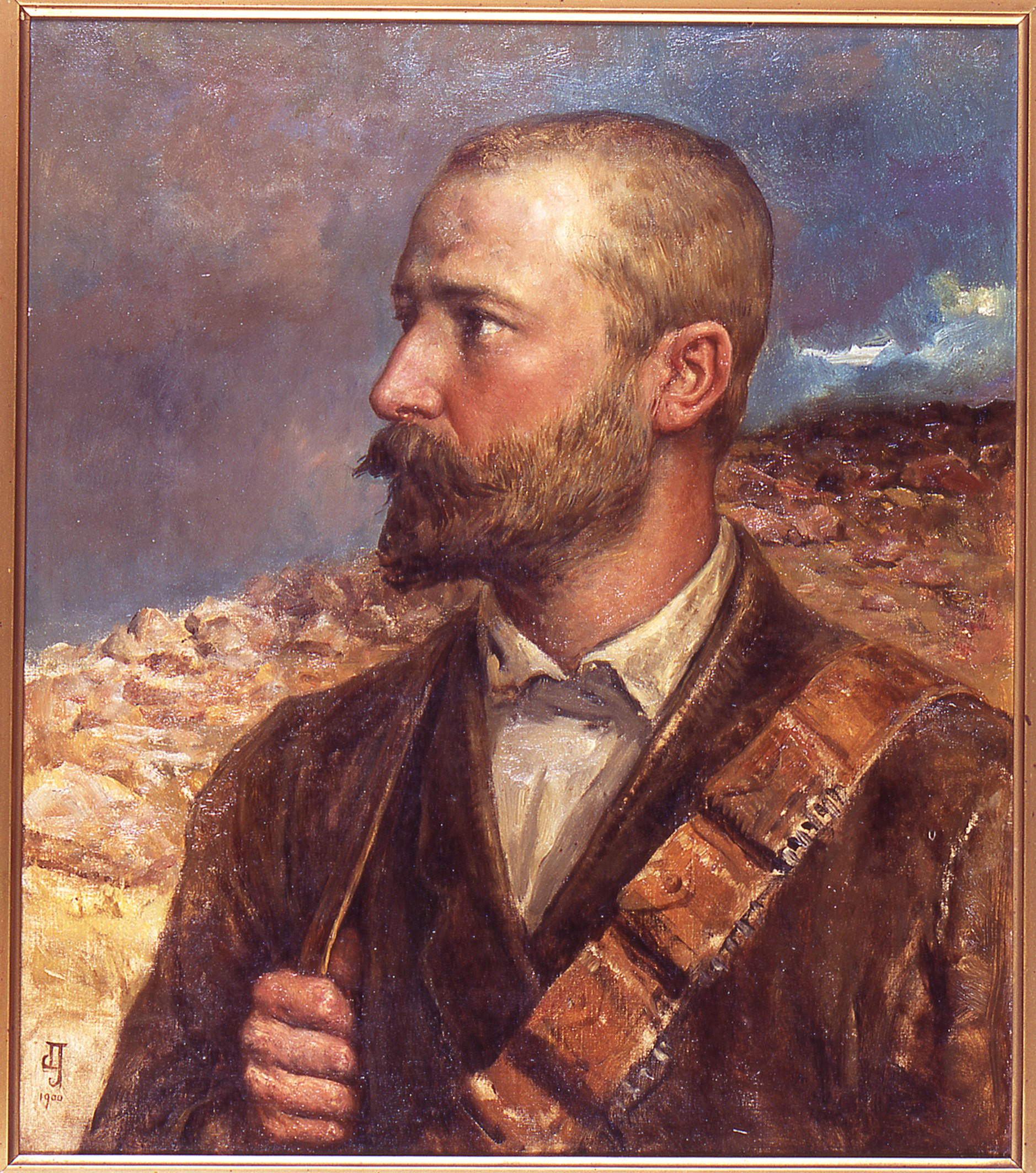
Portrait of Coster by Johan Antoni de Jonge (Academisch Historisch Museum, Leiden University.

== See also ==
- Dutch Corps Monument
