= Friedrich Kaufmann Höhne =

South African politician (1831–1879)

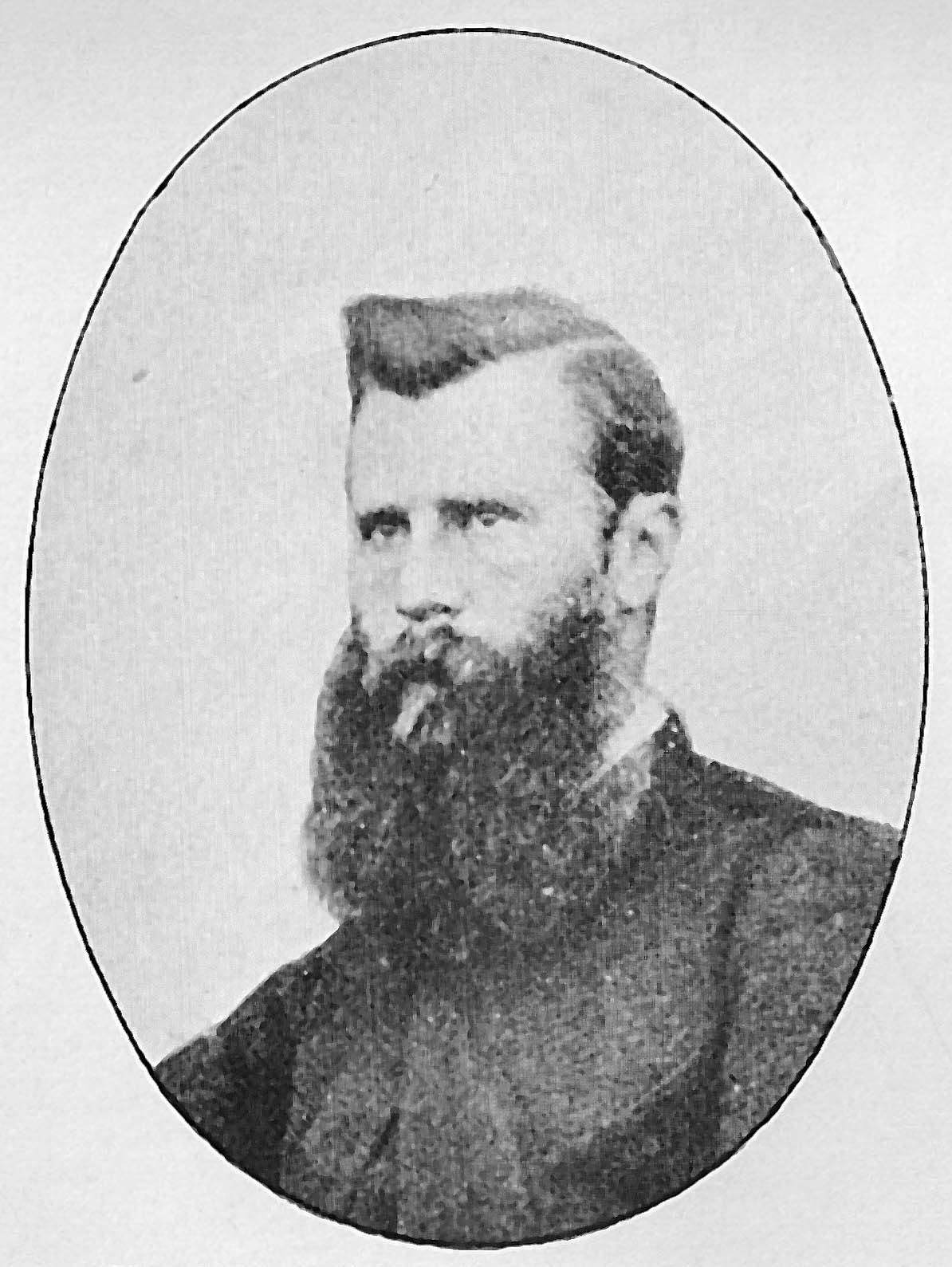

Government Secretary of the Orange Free State
- In office bef. 1871 – 19 April 1879
- Preceded by: Unknown
- Succeeded by: O.J. Truter J.Azn. (act.)

Acting President of the Orange Free State
- In office 31 August 1872 – 4 October 1872
- Preceded by: J.H. Brand
- Succeeded by: J.H. Brand

Personal details
- Born: 1831
- Died: 19 April 1879 (aged 47–48) Bloemfontein, Orange Free State

Just Friedrich Rudolph Kaufmann Höhne (1831 – Bloemfontein, 19 April 1879), commonly known as Friedrich Kaufmann Höhne, South African (Boer) politician, Government Secretary and in 1872 Acting State President of the Orange Free State, during the absence of State President Brand.

Höhne had a long career in the service of the Orange Free State, starting circa 1863 as Landdrost of the District of Philippolis. From there he moved on to the position of Government Secretary which he held until his death in 1879. Höhne was praised for his diplomatic approach to the problems with the English about their annexation of the diamond fields in the early 1870s.
