= E. J. P. Jorissen =

Dutch lawyer and politician

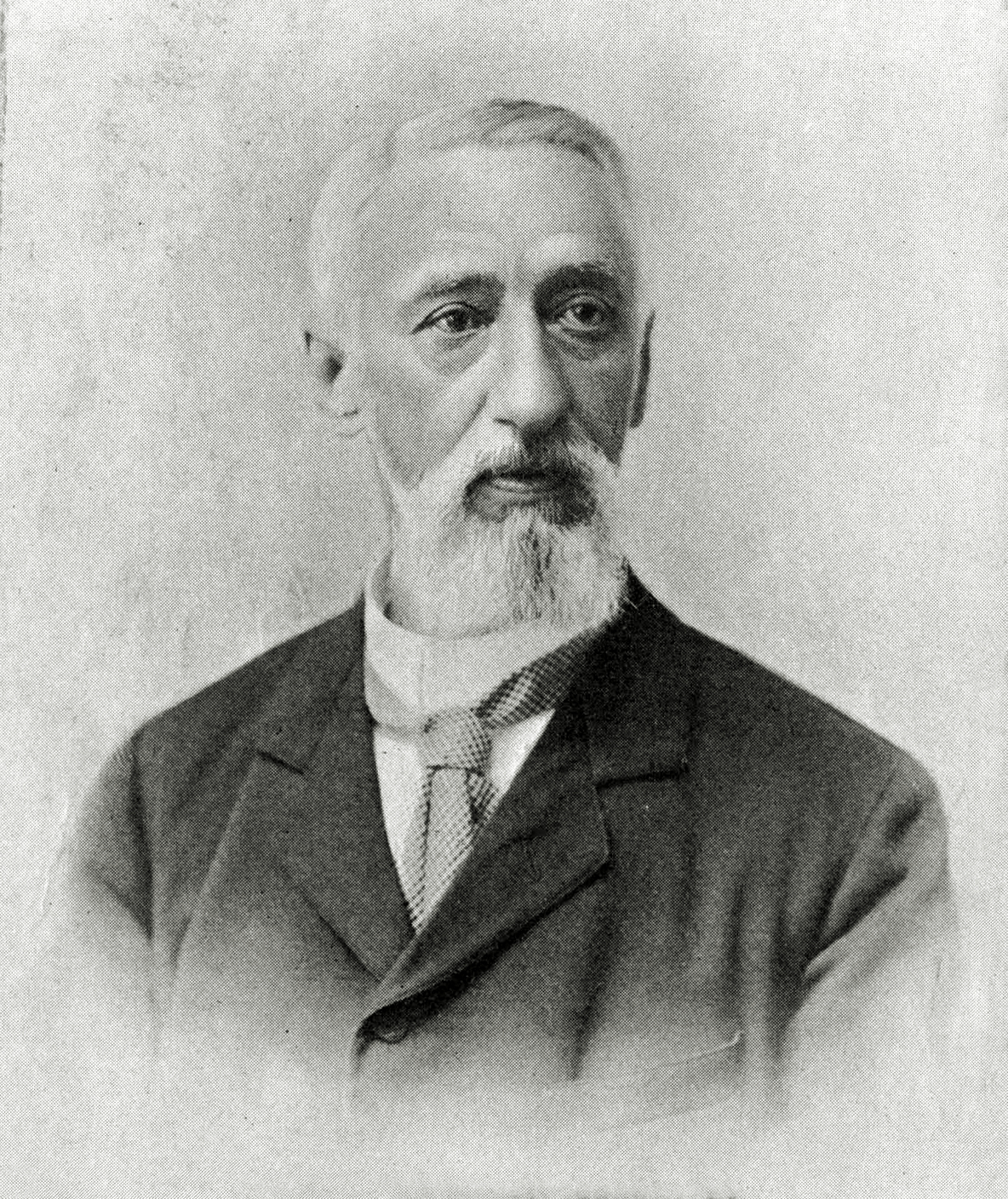
E J P Jorissen in 1897

Eduard Johan Pieter Jorissen (10 June 1829, Zwolle – 20 March 1912, Scheveningen) was a Dutch lawyer and politician. He graduated in theology and served as State Attorney of the South African Republic from 1876 to 1877 under Thomas François Burgers.
