= Jan Smuts in the South African Republic =

Jan Smuts from his return to South Africa (1894-1899)

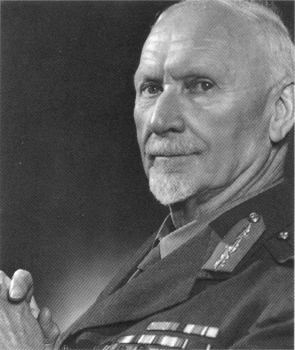
Jan Smuts

Field Marshal Jan Christian Smuts, OM, CH, ED, KC, FRS (24 May 1870 – 11 September 1950) was a prominent South African and Commonwealth statesman, military leader, and philosopher. He served as a Boer General during the Boer War, a British General during the First World War and was appointed Field Marshal by King George VI during the Second World War. In addition to various cabinet appointments, he served as Prime Minister of the Union of South Africa from 1919 until 1924 and from 1939 until 1948. From 1917 to 1919 he was one of five members of the British War Cabinet, helping to create the Royal Air Force. He played a leading part in the post-war settlements at the end of both world wars, making significant contributions towards the creation of the League of Nations and the United Nations. He did much to redefine the relationship between Britain and the Dominions and Colonies, leading to the formation of the British Commonwealth.

This article is about Jan Smuts' rise from obscurity to high office, from his return to South Africa in 1894 until the outbreak of the Second Boer War in 1899. After setting up a law practice in Cape Town, the Anglophile Smuts was drawn to the charismatic Cecil Rhodes. After the Jameson Raid, he felt betrayed, and moved to the South African Republic. Transforming himself into a hard-line Anglophobe, Smuts found himself office at the heart of Paul Kruger's government. As confrontation with the British Empire loomed, Smuts played a crucial role in the failed peace talks.

== In Cape Town ==
=== Return to South Africa ===
Smuts returned to the Cape in June 1895. News of his achievements in Cambridge had reached Cape Town; he was feted by local academics as an example of South African intellectual agility. He returned confident that his qualifications would lead to a successful legal career in the Cape; a career which would enable him to settle his debt with Professor Marais and to allow him to marry.

Smuts duly established his practice, but his briefs were few. With limited legal work he looked elsewhere to supplement his income. He managed to find a little work tutoring in Law, but his primary occupation quickly became freelance journalism. He wrote on a range of subjects, from articles on Cape flora and fauna to literary reviews, but it was to the world of politics that he was chiefly drawn.

Cape politics at that time was dominated by two men and one big idea. Cecil Rhodes and Jan Hofmeyr jointly proclaimed the ideal of unity; unity of the white population, Briton and Boer, and unity between the colonies and republics of Southern Africa.

=== Rhodes’s vision ===
Rhodes was one of the richest men in South Africa; chairman of both De Beers Consolidated Mines & Consolidated Gold Fields - the dominant diamond mining company in South Africa and one of the largest gold mining houses, respectively. Rhodes was also chairman of the British South Africa Company, granted a Royal Charter in 1889, giving it the right to develop the country beyond the Limpopo - present day Zimbabwe and Zambia. Rhodes was a fervent British imperialist, committed to the spread of British influence over the world, most especially in Africa. Southern Africa was divided into four separate entities; there were two British colonies, the Cape and Natal, and two Afrikaner republics, the Orange Free State and the Transvaal. Rhodes, in common with many at the time, saw this region as essentially an economic and social whole. He was convinced that future depended on the realisation of this inherent unity, on the creation of a union both political and economic.

Rhodes was a British imperialist; ultimately he wished to see a united South Africa under the British flag. However, he realised at the outset that this was not something which the Cape Afrikaners would support, much less those in the Transvaal and the Orange Free State. He therefore reinvented himself as a 'colonialist', he began to emphasise the primacy of local interests, putting them above the idea of subordination to imperial power. This gained him the support of Hofmeyr, the Afrikaner Bond party, and a large portion of the Cape vote. Rhodes was elected Prime Minister of the Cape in 1889.

The Afrikaner Bond party was the dominant political party in the Cape. Formed in 1879 with the purpose of removing British power and influence from South Africa, under Hofmeyr's leadership it lost its anti-British animus. Hofmeyr shared Rhodes's vision of unity and led his party in support of Rhodes. In order to maintain the support of the Bond membership, Rhodes agreed concessions with Hofmeyr; Rhodes introduced legislation to provide legal equality between the English and Dutch languages, and the imposition of mild tariffs on agricultural produce, gaining him the goodwill of the Cape Afrikaners, the majority of whom were farmers.

=== The Transvaal question ===
Traditionally the Cape had been the economic and political heart of South Africa. The discovery of diamonds there, in Kimberley in 1870, had only reinforced this dominance. However, the entire balance of power in South Africa was to change in 1886 when vast gold fields were discovered in the Transvaal, near Witwatersrand. Almost overnight the Transvaal changed from being the most rural, backward, and impoverished state of South Africa to being the provider of 25% of the world's gold.

The discovery of diamonds in the Cape had led to a vast inflow of investor capital. Railways were built, opening the country up, and migrants flooded in; in their wake came social and material development. When it came to the Transvaal however, this kind of development was strongly resisted. President Paul Kruger, known affectionately as Oom Paul (Uncle Paul), was a deeply conservative man. He was concerned that the religious and moral character of the Transvaal would change with the growth of the mines. Towns such as Johannesburg had already transformed from quiet villages into vast mining camps, filled with prostitution and drunkenness - vices utterly repugnant to the Calvinist Afrikaners. A common sentiment was 'the mining industry is the ruin of the true Transvaal in mind and spirit' (quote from Transvaal official, SP1, 22, p77).

These migrants, or uitlanders as they were known, had the potential to change the Transvaal forever; by 1895 the Transvaal government estimated there to be 30000 Afrikaner voters (or burghers, as they were known), to 60000 uitlanders. Kruger made every effort to keep the balance of power firmly in the burgher's favour. Initially, from the time of the first gold discoveries to 1890, uitlanders could obtain the right to vote after five years residence. In 1890, as the extent of foreign immigration became clear, this residency requirement was increased to fourteen years, combined with a stipulation that applicants must be over forty years old. In an attempt to compensate a new body, the Second Volksraad, was created with limited competence in designated legislative areas, all subject to the ratification of the Volksraad. Uitlanders could gain the right to vote for this body after two years residence and the right to stand for election to it after four years. Despite this, the fact remained that at the same time as gold revenues served as the Transvaal's main source of income, the uitlander mineworkers were denied any effective say in government.

As well as these forces within, Kruger was also fighting against external forces that he saw as threatening the Transvaal's independence. Kruger, who as a twelve-year-old boy had participated in the Great Trek, was profoundly distrustful of British regional power. He had played a key part in resisting the British annexation of 1877 both; efforts culminating in the 1881 Pretoria Convention and later the 1884 London Convention. These conventions guaranteed the Transvaal's independence subject only to Britain's right exercise control over certain areas of policy, principally over the Transvaal's foreign relations. Kruger was determined to prevent any further British encroachment, either militarily, economically or politically.

Distrustful of Rhodes's motives, the Transvaal refused to consider a proposed Southern Africa customs union and strongly resisted further development of rail links to the Cape. Indeed, far from acting as a unifying force, the question of railways and economics led to a trade war in 1894. With the growth of the vital gold industry, the land-locked Transvaal was dependent on the ports of the Cape and Natal – both under British control. Kruger was intent on removing this potential economic stranglehold. He looked to the east, beginning negotiations with the Portuguese colonial authorities. The Transvaal secured from Portugal the right to construct a railway line to the port of Delagoa Bay, a line which was completed in 1894. Kruger then drastically increased customs rates on south-bound cargoes, in an attempt to force the mining companies off the Cape and Natal lines, on to the new route. The situation rapidly escalated, culminating in the Transvaal prohibiting all imports coming in via the Cape. The issue was only resolved when Britain informed the Transvaal government that their actions were a breach of the London convention, that unless the restrictions were removed the British government would be obliged to intervene.

There was notable political opposition to Kruger within the Transvaal, not merely from the largely pro-British uitlanders but from many burghers, men of undoubted patriotic and republican feeling. However, while Kruger retained a majority and remained in power, there was little chance of the necessary rapprochement emerging that would lead to participation in an economic, much less political union.

=== Smuts’s political genesis ===
Smuts was in full agreement with Rhodes's public platform of South African unity, sentiments which the young Smuts had begun to advocate in his 1888 Victoria College address and in his 1891 Ebden essay. Smuts saw union as being self-evidently beneficial, the only possible point of contention being whether it would be a union dominated by Britain or one dominated by the Afrikaners. There was another way though, one exemplified by the Rhodes – Bond relationship; union between the states and colonies would be accompanied by union of the white races. The question of unity would not fall upon the stale old argument of whether Briton or Boer would have the upper hand; the unified South Africa would be run by a unified race of South Africans. Smuts saw this alliance between Rhodes and Hofmeyr, this union of the two white races, as a permanent and insoluble part of Cape life, an optimistic sign of the future to the rest of South Africa. Smuts, determined to do what he could to aid this process, used his newspaper articles in support of Rhodes; defending what he saw as the man of vision against his parochial and small-minded rivals. As Smuts was to write in 1902:

When Mr Cecil Rhodes appeared on the scene in 1889 as Premier of the Cape Colony under Bond auspices, with a platform of racial conciliation, political consolidation of South Africa and northern expansion, my natural bias as well as the glamour of magnificence which distinguished this policy from the 'parish pump politics' of his predecessors, made me a sort of natural convert to his views. I began to dream of a great South Africa in which the English and the Boer peoples would dwell together in happy concord.

Smuts viewed the policies of the Transvaal with disappointment. Smuts set great store by the ties of blood and kinship between the Afrikaners; the Transvaal, in common with most of South Africa, had been originally peopled by men from the Cape. Surely the interests of all Afrikaners throughout the region must be essentially the same? Smuts identified two main factors hindering union; the reluctance of the British population to put down roots, to regard South Africa as home rather than looking back to Britain, and the Afrikaner desire to keep itself apart, relying on its superior numbers to impose its will upon the rest. So far as Smuts could see these two obstacles had been overcome in the Cape, why not in the Transvaal?

Smuts blamed what he termed the 'Hollander tendency'; the Transvaal lacked men with the talent to run what was, in effect, a newly industrialised country. Kruger therefore looked outside the country, mainly to the Netherlands. In the Netherlands there was considerable interest in the Transvaal, regarded as a country peopled largely from Dutch stock. In time, considerable numbers of able young men came down, eventually dominating the administration of the Transvaal. Kruger welcomed their arrival, not only were they of the same blood, but the Netherlands had no political ambition in South Africa – unlike Britain and her uitlanders.

Smuts could accept that the reluctance towards union and development came down to a simple, God-fearing people, concerned at the effect of the influx of migrants and industry on their old pastoral ways. However, Smuts was convinced that these concerns had been unduly encouraged by these Dutchmen, concerned more with maintaining their own positions than acting in the best interests of the Afrikaner people.

In October 1895 January Hofmeyr approached Smuts, asking him to speak in defence of Rhodes at a meeting to be held at Kimberley. Smuts readily agreed and on the 29th of the same month he delivered a speech in which he backed Rhodes, both the man and his politics, to the hilt. Smuts defended Rhodes on many fronts, but especially against accusations that Rhodes was acting with duplicity in his dealings with the Bond. The less charitable had difficulty in reconciling Rhodes's previous bellicose imperialism with his new-found concern for the colonial view.

=== The Jameson Raid ===
Unknown to Smuts, this speech was soon to cause him considerable embarrassment. At that very moment Rhodes was preparing to take drastic action to create his South African federation. Unlike Hofmeyr, content to allow matters to develop at their own pace, trusting that the seventy-year-old Kruger and his obstructive policies would not last much longer, Rhodes feared that the growing wealth of the Transvaal would give them the decisive voice in any future union negotiations. Unlike Kruger, Rhodes was not an elderly man but his health was now too uncertain to allow him to be patient – not if he wished to see his ambitions fulfilled during his lifetime. Rhodes was determined to force a solution.

Rhodes's big idea was the Jameson Raid - an armed invasion of the Transvaal, combined with simultaneous orchestrated uprisings amongst the uitlanders. He believed that this would lead to the overthrow of Kruger's government, leaving the way open for the British High Commissioner to intervene and restore order; order, that is, on British terms.

On 29 December 1895, 600 men, led by Dr Leander Starr Jameson, duly invaded the Transvaal. However, the ground had been insufficiently prepared; the uitlander risings failed to materialise and the invading troops were quickly subdued and arrested. Telegrams and notes found in Jameson's baggage left Rhodes thoroughly implicated.

Reaction to the Raid was swift. The Bond condemned Rhodes's conduct and he was forced to resign. There was international condemnation from Britain's rivals in Africa, most notably from Germany. In a telegram to Kruger, the German Kaiser congratulated him on 'restoring peace and in maintaining the country against attack ... without appealing to the help of friendly powers'.

The Cape polarised along racial lines; Britons, stung by any suggestion of international intervention, took it as a matter of national pride to support Rhodes and the cause of British imperialism (sentiments known as ‘Jingoism’), the Afrikaners condemned his duplicity and looked to unity with their fellow Afrikaners in the Transvaal and Orange Free State. Not only had Rhodes turned out to be a false prophet, but the great dream of conciliation had now collapsed amidst a chorus of mutual antagonism and recriminations.

Smuts felt a keen sense of betrayal. Disgusted at the duplicity of Rhodes and the reaction of the British population, he began to identify himself more and more with his own community, the Afrikaners, both those in the colony and those in broader South Africa.

Smuts's political career was over, for the time being. Political leadership in the Cape had passed to the same elderly ‘parish pump’ politicians that he had previously despaired of. He continued his journalism but he was still failing to make any headway with his legal practice. He made one final attempt to secure a future in the Cape, in March 1896 he applied for a lectureship in Law as the South Africa College – he was turned down in favour of an older man. Smuts began to contemplate a future outside the colony; in September 1896 he paid a visit to the Transvaal. As he was to write in 1902:

In the course of 1896 it became so clear to me that the British connection was harmful to South Africa’s best interest that I feared that my further position as a Cape politician would be a false one. I therefore left the colony for good and settled in the Transvaal.

Smuts's departure from the Cape was perhaps less to do with politics than he was later inclined to suggest; as an uitlander, he would be barred from voting until he had fulfilled the fourteen-year residency requirement. Certainly he now found the Cape political environment uncongenial, but the truth was that despite his views on Kruger's republic, he hoped that it would a young man better career opportunities than he had found in the Cape. Smuts left for the Transvaal on 20 January 1897.

== Starting afresh ==
=== To Johannesburg ===
Smuts established his legal practice in the mining boom town of Johannesburg. To his surprise, after the discouragement of the past 22 months in the Cape, he found himself able to earn a decent living in Law. He continued to augment his salary with a little legal coaching and journalism. After only three months in Johannesburg he felt sufficiently financially secure to contemplate marriage. On a visit to the Cape in April 1897, he appeared at the house of Isie Krige and proposed. The couple were married a few days later, by Professor JI Marais – Smuts's benefactor at Cambridge, and Smuts returned to Johannesburg with his new wife. Smuts's life settled into a happy routine; twins were born to the pair in March 1898, but unfortunately survived only a few weeks.

=== A new direction ===
In Johannesburg, a raw mining town of only 50,000 whites, the professional class was thin on the ground. Amongst this group, each member quickly became intimately acquainted with his peers. Smuts quickly gained an excellent reputation, respected for his prodigious learning, his ability to argue a case and for his integrity. Smuts soon made the acquaintance of several of the leading men of the Transvaal. A friend introduced him to Piet Grobler, President Kruger's nephew and private secretary. Grobler in turn introduced Smuts to President Kruger himself.

Smuts made a keen impression on the President; Kruger was later to write of his immediate attraction to Smuts's power and drive. In his memoirs he described Smuts as a man of 'iron will', destined, if he were spared, to play a great role in the history of South Africa.

Smuts began to make his mark at a time of great controversy in the Transvaal. Kruger, enraged at the judgement of the High Court in the case of Brown v. Leyds, dismissed the Chief Justice, Sir JG Kotzé. The circumstances surrounding this judgement worth exploring as they are illustrative of the general state of public administration in the Transvaal at the time.

=== The Kotzé affair ===
The matter in dispute was Brown's claim for mining rights worth £372,400 against the Republic. This was a considerable sum, but far more important was the legal point that the case raised. The case boiled down to one fundamental legal issue, had the Volksraad enacted the relevant legislation in accordance with the Constitution? In January 1897 the High Court held that it had not, granted Brown's claim, and claimed the right to examine all legislation in order to ascertain its constitutional validity, the so-called 'testing right'..

The root of the problem was the slipshod nature of the Constitution. Originally written to forge a political compromise between warring factions, in many areas the Constitution was too vague or obscure and was never treated with the seriousness and respect such a document usually enjoyed.

The Constitution required proposed legislation go through a complex and tedious process of checks and balances; amongst other requirements, bills had to be publicly published for three months before becoming law. The habit arose in the early years of the Republic for the Volksraad to disregard this. Instead of following constitutional procedure, the Volksraad passed all legislation by simple majority resolution. This procedure had the advantage that the Courts treated the legislation as law immediately. If the Court gained their right to review all legislation they would almost certainly hold invalid almost all laws passed over the past forty years, from the alcohol and public morality laws to the gold laws vital to the economy and crucial to the survival of the Transvaal government.

It was Kotze's insistence on affirming this purported right that led to his dismissal in February 1898. Whilst legal opinion had been divided on whether Kotze's judgement in Brown v. Leyds was legally sound (especially as he had found little problem with legislation by resolution in his previous judgements), there was considerable protest at his dismissal, most vociferously from the Uitlander's representatives. Kruger's intervention was widely seen as unwarranted intrusion upon the independence of the judiciary. Smuts however strongly supported Kruger's action, both politically and legally. Smuts went so far as to publish a legal opinion in the President's support.

The situation was not quite the clear-cut executive-judiciary dispute it may seem. Kotze was not only a judge put a politician, a politician who in 1893 had stood as rival to Kruger in the presidential elections. Smuts was convinced that Kotze's actions were strongly motivated by a desire to appeal to British elements: the Uitlanders, the High Commissioner and the Colonial office; each of which had been vociferous in their criticism of the chaotic nature of Transvaal administration. Smuts strongly condemned this attempt to usurp the position of Afrikaners in an Afrikaner republic.

== Working for Oom Paul ==
Although Smuts was not alone in his views, his support of Kruger had brought him very much to the President's notice. Smuts's brilliant academic record and excellent reputation, all combined with his Cape origins, attracted Kruger still further. On 8 June 1898 Smuts, at 28 years of age, was granted second-class citizenship of the Transvaal; enabling Kruger to appoint him to the post of State Attorney the same day.

=== Reinvigorating the Dutch ===
Smuts took to his new job with tremendous zeal. He saw elements of the old Hollander order, corrupting and repressive, in the system that he inherited and immediately set to work to eradicate them. Smuts attacked illicit gold traders, prostitutes and brothel keepers, unlicensed alcohol sellers, and counterfeiters. Smuts campaigned to improve the standards of local magistrates and civil servants, and, mindful of the Kotzé affair, he strove to get the haphazard and scattered laws of the Transvaal into order.

Smuts waged his war against corruption wherever he found it, particularly in the detective section of the Johannesburg police. When it became apparent that the officer in charge of suppressing prostitution was in league with the brothel-keepers Smuts dismissed him and gave orders for his prosecution. When allegations arose that the chief detective was implicated in illegal gold sales Smuts launched an investigation, had the chief detective dismissed, and convinced the Volksraad to place the detective force under his direct control. Smuts now had the central position in the fight against crime.

All this was in addition to the relatively run of the mill and mundane work he was expected to do: advising the government on points of law, drafting government contracts, drafting new legislation, instituting criminal prosecutions, and representing the government in court in all cases to which it was a party.

In all areas Smuts was determined to do all he could to improve the state of the Transvaal, in order to make it worthy of its role as the standard-bearer for the Afrikaner nation in South Africa and to deflect the widespread criticism of the state of Transvaal governance. Little by little he sought to combat the charges of maladministration and corruption, from the Augean stables of the detective department to the chaotic nature of government administration. However, another current was affecting South Africa, one over which Smuts could exercise no control.

=== The British connection ===
British policy in South Africa during the second half of the nineteenth century had been one of vacillation. There had been episodes of aggressive expansionism, the so-called 'forward' policy, which would then be followed by a period of retrenchment. A case in point was the 1877 annexation of the Transvaal. In 1877 the Transvaal was bankrupt - the gold fields of the Witwatersrand were far in the future, they were also under attack from several of the Native tribes, particularly from the Zulus. The British government judged it an opportune moment to add it to the Empire. The annexation itself proceeded with little difficulty and the British Army were able to destroy the Zulus as a military power in the 1879 Zulu war. However, in 1880 the Boers, led by Kruger, arose, inflicting a number of relatively minor defeats upon the British army, culminating in the British defeat at the battle of Majuba; so ended what later became known as the First Boer War. Britain's forces in South Africa were enough to suppress this rebellion and a relief column was sent up from the Cape, this time however, politics intervened. By 1880 the Conservative government which had initiated the annexation had been replaced by a Liberal administration under Gladstone. Gladstone was no imperialist and had been a vigorous critic of the annexation from the start. Gladstone called back the relief force and began negotiations with the Transvaal Afrikaners, negotiations culminating in the restoration of independence by the Pretoria and London Conventions.

During the following years, British policy remained Gladstoneian. No attempt was made to extend influence in South Africa or to coerce the Afrikaner republics; the most the government were prepared to do was to see that European powers were excluded from the area, the so-called 'paramount power' policy. This was to change in June 1895. In that month there was another change of government and yet another change of policy. The Conservatives, under Lord Salisbury, took power. The new Colonial Secretary was to be Joseph Chamberlain.

==== Another new direction ====
In 1895 Chamberlain was serving in a Conservative government, but in 1881 he had been a Liberal serving in Gladstone's Cabinet as President of the Board of Trade. Quarrels over Irish Home Rule had led him to split from the party in 1886 and ally himself with the Conservatives. Now, finally back in power, he was determined to reverse what he considered to be one of the great mistakes of Gladstone's government – the reversal of the 1877 annexation.

Chamberlain's role in the Jameson Raid was unclear to contemporary observers. He had met with Rhodes's representatives but he had always taken care that any dealings should be done through intermediaries. He also made efforts to avoid allowing himself to be told too much – officially, at any rate. He managed to survive and keep his position by a combination of back-room deals and deceit. These deals included getting Rhodes's agreement to keep silent - in return for which Chamberlain guaranteed that the Royal Charter of the British South Africa Company would not be revoked. Chamberlain's chief representative to Rhodes's emissaries, Sir Graham Bower, was induced to claim that he had withheld details of the plot from his chief. Before the resulting inquiry, to which Chamberlain was in fact appointed to sit, he proceeded to deny all knowledge of the Raid.

With his position secure, Chamberlain looked to the future. In the aftermath of the Raid, Kruger's popularity had risen considerably, what was more he was now enjoying the support of the broad Afrikaner population, both in the colonies and the republics. Chamberlain saw that it would be fatal for Britain to be the instigator of any further action against the Transvaal; public opinion, in Britain as well as in South Africa, would be strongly against any further military adventures. Chamberlain resorted to a wait-and-see policy.

Chamberlain appointed a new High Commissioner for South Africa in May 1897. Sir Alfred Milner was sent out to South Africa with firm instructions to refrain from further unilateral action against the Transvaal. Milner was a dedicated proponent of British Imperialism and of the 'forward' policy; viewing it as the only way to preserve what he saw as Britain's waning regional influence. February 1898 saw Kruger re-elected for his fourth term, with a substantial majority over his reformist rivals. Milner took this as a sign that there was no time to lose; if there was any further waiting the result would be Afrikaner dominance to the exclusion of Britain, orchestrated from a powerful Transvaal. Milner returned to London in November 1898 for consultations with Chamberlain. Having observed the situation for the past eighteen months, he was now sure of his strategy. Milner proposed that the British government should work up a crisis, giving them a legitimate pretext to intervene, a pretext that would place Britain in the right and the Transvaal in the wrong in the court of public opinion. Chamberlain re-iterated his instruction to Milner that the British government could not be seen to be coercing Kruger; any intervention must be as a result of the Transvaal putting itself in the wrong. Milner returned to South Africa a satisfied man; while the British government would not act, Chamberlain had not tied the hands of officials in South Africa. Milner was determined to be the one to force this pretext.

Smuts, taking office in June 1898, knew nothing of the inner motivations of men such as Chamberlain and Milner. Smuts's view was that the state and nature of public administration gave rise to various issues of dispute between the uitlanders, the British government, and the Transvaal. Smuts hoped that with good faith on all sides, negotiations could lead to such political reforms as proved necessary, satisfying uitlander opinion, the British government, and Smuts's own desire for the Transvaal to embrace the new industry in its midst. Smuts's work in the immediate aftermath of his appointment can all be seen in this light. In the closing days of 1898 however, Smuts was to learn, at first hand, something of the true nature of British intentions.

=== The Edgar case ===
On 19 December 1898 there was a vulgar brawl in Johannesburg between two drunken uitlanders; a relatively commonplace event in the rough streets of the Rand, but one which was to have significant ramifications. One Edgar believed himself to have been insulted by a certain Foster. As in the way of such things, Edgar and Foster fought – Foster coming off very much the worse, with life-threatening injuries. Honour thus assuaged, Edgar returned home. In due course the Transvaal police (the ZARPs, as they were commonly known) turned up. Whilst resisting arrest Edgar made a lunge at one of the constables, Jones, with an iron-shod stick. In the ensuing melee Jones shot Edgar dead.

Such was the narrative which was brought before Smuts the next morning. The Zarps had gained a reputation for use of excessive force, even brutality. Smuts was aware of the delicate political aspects of the situation; a Transvaal constable had shot and killed a British subject. It was essential that the situation be seen to be handled with the utmost rigour and impartiality. Smuts's hopes were immediately dealt a blow when the public prosecutor reduced the charge against Jones from murder to culpable homicide. Jones was thereafter bailed for the relatively small amount of £200.

The cry against the Transvaal government was immediately taken up by the primary representative of uitlander opinion, the South African League.

==== The South African League ====
The League had been established in the aftermath of the Jameson Raid and had quickly become the principal and most strident voice of uitlander agitation in the Transvaal. The League was not concerned with merely campaigning for civil rights for uitlanders; its aim was to encourage British intervention on the Transvaal – intervention leading to eventual annexation. The League had been formed by, and continued to be run by, the very men who attempted to organise the Johannesburg risings in support of the Jameson Raid. The League was thoroughly committed to the British cause in South Africa; although independent of the British government, it looked to British officials for guidance and direction – so much so that by March 1898 the British Agent in Pretoria, Conyngham Greene, was able to write to Milner that:

The League is ... the only body in Johannesburg that has a spark of real Imperial feeling ... It therefore, in a certain sense, deserves sympathy, and looks to me for encouragement ... Up till now I have managed to keep some sort of control over the executive [of the League]; notwithstanding that they are, of course, being continually pressed by the mass of the League to resort to more vigorous action. (24 March 1898 (African(South), 543, no 197), Marais, 164

In the aftermath of the Raid, the British government had every reason to hold back the League, with widespread support for Kruger throughout the Afrikaner population of South Africa. But this organisation, with their allies in the English-speaking newspapers, now proceeded to whip up the latent hostility of the uitlanders towards the Zarps. The Transvaal government were accused of displaying undue leniency towards Constable Jones; the League protested at the reduction of the charge to culpable homicide and his release on £200 bail, a sum which was less than that typically imposed upon uitlanders for relatively trivial offences. These protests found a receptive audience amongst the broad mass of uitlanders; the ground was laid for confrontation.

The League, under the auspices of the newly formed 'Edgar Relief Committee', proceeded to organise a large protest meeting for the 24th. At this meeting they proposed to present a petition to the representatives of the British government, appealing for intervention. The potential for confrontation was increased by the fact that such a demonstration would be illegal under the Transvaal's Public Order Act.

Smuts attempted to defuse the situation; he called for the papers relating to the Edgar case and after examining them gave orders for the re-arrest of Jones on a charge of murder. Smuts believed that he had now removed the grounds of the impending protest. The acting British agent in the Transvaal undertook to use his influence to have the meeting called off.

=== The gathering storm ===
In the midst of this political turmoil ordinary business went on. On the 22nd Smuts invited Edmund Fraser to call on him to discuss recent allegations of police mistreatment of Cape Coloured Transvaal residents, and various other matters of current controversy. When the meeting was concluded, the two men remained behind and conversed awhile. Their conversation turned to the matter of Anglo-Boer relations. What Smuts was to hear struck him so forcefully that immediately upon Fraser's departure, he made a detailed note on what had passed. Fraser stated that:

"… the British government had sat still for two years because its own officials had put it in a false position in the Jameson Raid. The time had now, however, come for her to take action."

Smuts asked him what he meant:

"...Gladstone had made a great mistake in giving the country back after Majuba before having defeated the Boers. The Boers throughout South Africa had a vague aspiration for a great republic throughout South Africa and Gladstone had by his action encouraged this aspiration in them. The British Government knew of this but had always remained sitting still, but in his [Fraser’s] opinion the time had now come to make an end of this 'by striking a blow'. When he [Fraser] left London he was instructed that England would be satisfied if the South African Republic should become a richer Orange Free State; but that was not the intention of the South African Republic, to play a humble role. She would have nothing to do with the paramount influence of England but had always tried to play a role among the nations and had, with a view to that, always coquetted with the European powers. In his [Fraser’s] opinion the time had come to make an end of all this by showing the Boers that England was master in South Africa."

Smuts asked Fraser what would give occasion for this:

"England was very dissatisfied about the maladministration and especially about ill-treatment of her subjects which was worse than elsewhere. On this point England would take action. He [Fraser] knew well that England would not go fighting about abstract subjects, such as suzerainty, which are not understood by the English people and the main in the street. She would fight about things that everyone could understand, things like [police brutality]. He knew from the Colonial Office that, if England were ever again to attack the South African Republic, it would be because of the maladministration here, and England as paramount power had the right to intervene on this ground. He knew that … some improvements had appeared, but there was still enough to complain of."

Smuts now began to see the present agitation in a different light. Smuts had advocated reform out of his own personal conviction, but it now appeared that the British government were determined to press reform in the strongest possible terms, with threat of conflict in the background.

The next day, 24 December, saw further developments. Despite Smuts's actions in ordering Jones to be tried on a charge of murder, and the assurance of British officials that they would do what they could to defuse the situation, the South African League held their illegal protest meeting. Here the League intended to present a petition to the British High Commissioner, a petition addressed to the Queen, calling on the British government to take such steps as were necessary for the 'protection of their lives and liberties'. This was the intention, but Sir Alfred Milner, who would have welcomed the petition as leverage against Kruger, was still in London. Instead, his temporary replacement, Sir William Butler, refused to accept it. Sir William had no sympathy with Milner's aims; he refused the petition and in a dispatch to London he condemned the whole controversy as nothing than a storm whipped up by the League.

=== Defeat from the jaws of victory? ===
On 1 January, Foster died of his injuries. With the refusal of the League's petition, the whole controversy looked like dying with him. It possibly would have, but for a decision of 5 January, from Smuts's own office, which displayed a chronic lack of judgement. To what extent the decision was that of Smuts or that of the government, which Smuts was bound to follow, is uncertain; either way, the decision of the Stare Attorney's office to arrest and prosecute the organisers of 24 December meeting, Thomas Dodd and Clement Webb - both high officials of the South African League, blew new life into the dying embers. Popular indignation was compounded by the fact that bail for the two men was assessed at £500 each, substantially more than the £200 bail that had gained Constable Jones his release.

This had the all too predictable effect of provoking a fresh storm of agitation. The League immediately organised another protest, to be held in Johannesburg on 14 January. This time, in order to keep within the law (which banned unlicensed outdoor meetings), the League proposed to hold it in an enclosed space (a large circus building known as the Amphitheatre).

By this time the Afrikaners were becoming ever more indignant at the uitlander's incessant clamouring. Smuts, foreseeing trouble, appealed to the leading Transvaal burghers to do all that they could to see that restraint was observed. The 14th arrived, the meeting took place, Smuts's fears were realised. The assembly was violently broken up by a mob of 600-700 Boers, many of whom used chair legs to beat the assembled uitlanders. The attendant Zarps stood by and did nothing.

Constable Jones finally came to trial in February 1899. The Court considered the evidence and had little hesitation in passing judgement. Jones was found not guilty. In his concluding remarks the judge made some, in the circumstances, ill-advised comments in commendation of the police, saying he knew that 'under difficult circumstances, they would always know how to do their duty.'

By now the Rand was in uproar. Another petition was prepared for presentation to the British government. Sir Alfred Milner, now back in South Africa, made it clear that he would accept and forward any petitions addressed to the British government. By 27 March there were over 21,000 signatories to a petition which besought:

Your Most Gracious Majesty to extend your Majesty's protection to your Majesty's loyal subjects resident in this State ... and to direct your Majesty's government in South Africa to take measures which will secure the speedy reform of the abuses complained of, and to obtain substantial guarantees from the Government of this State of their rights as British subjects.

As promised, Milner accepted this petition, on 27 March - forwarding it to London the next day. On 10 May he received word from Chamberlain that, after due consideration, the Cabinet had accepted the terms of the petition. The British government were now committed to a new phase of intervention in South Africa.

Between January and May Smuts had not been idle. In the light of his conversion with Fraser the crucial nature of the uitlander question was clear. This could easily serve as a pretext for British interference in the Transvaal, maybe even war. Smuts, by this time firmly established as one of the foremost members of the Transvaal government, took a key role in attempts to resolve the issue.

=== Fighting for peace ===
Far more important than the petty squabbles about police corruption was the looming threat of war with the British Empire. In early 1897, Sir Alfred Milner had become High Commissioner for South Africa, and the situation took a turn for the worse. Milner urged the British government to dispatch more soldiers to South Africa in order to maintain the balance of power in the region. Although the men were never sent, Kruger interpreted these overtures as being aggressive, not conservative. Meaning to quell what he saw as a civil war, President Martinus Steyn of the Orange Free State begged Kruger to agree to a peace conference in Bloemfontein.

Due to his loyalty to Kruger and his knowledge of the British demeanour, Smuts sat with Kruger in the Transvaal delegation. In the event, Smuts ran the show. As the only man of the Transvaal delegation fluent in English, he jumped in at every opportunity, speaking for the entire country in his refusal to grant political rights to the Uitlanders. Milner, furious that he could not speak directly with President Kruger, ignored Smuts, whom he considered to be a lowly and unsuccessful lawyer. Incandescent with rage at this insult to his intelligence, Smuts drafted the final offer to Milner, but deliberately included a paragraph that he knew would be unacceptable. Outraged at this insult, Milner called the conference off, and returned to Cape Town. All parties were resigned to war.

== Select bibliography ==
=== Smuts, General ===
- Hancock, WK - Smuts: 1. The Sanguine Years, 1870–1919, (1962)
- Ingham, K - Jan Christian Smuts: The Conscience of a South African, (1986)
- Millin, SG - General Smuts, (2 vols), (1933)
- Smuts, JC - Jan Christian Smuts, (1952)

=== South Africa ===
- Fitzpatrick, JP - The Transvaal From Within, (1899)
- Gordon, CT - The Growth of Boer Opposition to Kruger (1890–1895), (1970)
- Marais, JS - The Fall of Kruger's Republic, (1961)
- Pakenham, T - The Boer War, (1979)
- van der Poel, J - The Jameson Raid, (1951)
- Reitz, FW - A Century of Wrong, (1899)

=== Primary sources ===
- Hancock, WK and van der Poel, J (eds) - Selections from the Smuts Papers, 1886–1950, (7 vols), (1966–73)
