= Paarlshoop =

- Paarlshoop's location in Gauteng
- Coordinates: 26°12′06″S 28°02′27″E
- Country: South Africa
- Province: Gauteng
- City: Johannesburg
- Established: October 5, 1938

Area
  - Total: 1.00 km^{2} (0.39 sq mi)

Population (2011)
  - Total: 1,890
  - Density: 1,890/km^{2} (4,900/sq mi)

Races
  - White: 5.6%
  - Asian: 7.7%
  - Cape Coloureds: 15.3%
  - Black: 70.5%
  - Other: 0.9%

Languages
  - English: 20.7%
  - Zulu: 16.1%
  - Afrikaans: 15.1%
  - Tswana: 13.9%
  - Other: 34.2%

Paarlshoop is a suburb of Johannesburg, South Africa, around 4 km west of City Hall. It borders Langlaagte to the north and Homestead Park to the northeast. The name comes from the village of Paarlshoop, the oldest private township on the Witwatersrand.

== History ==
Paarlshoop's name comes indirectly from the city of Paarl in the Boland but more directly from Paarlkamp, which along with Ferreiraskamp (on Turffontein Farm) and Meyerskamp (later called Natalkamp, on Doornfontein Farm) was one of the three first miners' camps on the Rand. Paarlkamp was also called Afrikanerkamp due to the large number of Afrikaners in the Paarl area, home to the organization known as the Genootskap van Regte Afrikaners. Paarlkamp was built on Langlaagte farm, where the main gold vein was found in June 1886. During the resulting Witwatersrand Gold Rush, several people from Paarl, including Stephanus Jacobus du Toit, formed the Paarl-Pretoria Gold Mining Association. On October 23, 1886, D.F. du Toit and H.J. Schoeman got the Association's permission to build a town on Langlaagte, which had been purchased by G.C. Oosthuizen for 5,000 on September 26 of that year. Since the land was part of the agriculturally zoned area - under article 20 of Law no. 8, 1885 - it was not earmarked for mining. The application letter made it clear that the sites were already in use before W.H. Auret Pritchard surveyed them on October 23. The State Secretary of the South African Republic confirmed that this was not the government's concern, since the land was private. On January 16, 1887, the auction house of H.J. Morkel and W.M. du Toit put the homesteads for sale. Paarlshoop - literally "Paarl's hope" - thus became a heavily Afrikaner town, the first city built on the Rand, since the sites were surveyed in front of Randjeslaagte. By the end of September 1886, the camp had already swollen to a population of 100, and in October it housed a butcher, bakery, smithy, and a general store. Most citizens lived in tents and wagons.

The Rev. Abraham Kriel built the Langlaagte orphanage on a campus alongside today's church to house war orphans immediately after the Second Boer War. Today it is known as the Abraham Kriel Kinderhuis in his honor. The area was officially proclaimed a suburb on October 5, 1938, when it represented No. 38 on Langlaagte.

== Sources ==
- Potgieter, D.J. (ed.) (1972). Standard Encyclopaedia of Southern Africa. Cape Town: Nasionale Opvoedkundige Uitgewery (Nasou).
- Raper, Peter Edmund (2004). New Dictionary of South African Place Names. Johannesburg/Cape Town: Jonathan Ball Publishers.
- Stals, Prof. Dr. E.L.P (ed.) (1978). Afrikaners in die Goudstad, vol. 1: 1886 - 1924. Cape Town/Pretoria: HAUM.
