= Rossmore, Johannesburg =

Rossmore
- Rossmore's location in Gauteng
- Coordinates: 26°11′00″S 27°59′40″E
- Country: South Africa
- Province: Gauteng
- City: Johannesburg
- Established: September 9, 1925

Area
  - Total: 1.16 km^{2} (0.45 sq mi)

Population (2011)
  - Total: 1,539
  - Density: 1,327/km^{2} (3,440/sq mi)

Races
  - White: 9.2%
  - Asian: 3.8%
  - Cape Coloured: 7.7%
  - Black: 77.1%
  - Other: 2.2%

Languages
  - English: 21.1%
  - Zulu: 20.2%
  - Tswana: 11.6%
  - Tswana: 10.1%
  - Other: 37.0%

Rossmore is a suburb of Johannesburg, around 5 km northwest of City Hall. It borders Langlaagte to the north and Homestead Park. The name comes from the village of Paarlshoop, the oldest private township on the Witwatersrand.

Rossmore covers 1 km^{2} and borders Westdene on the northwest, Melville on the north, Auckland Park on the east, Brixton on the south, and Hurst Hill on the southwest. The majority of Rossmore consists of the Kingsway Campus Auckland Park of the University of Johannesburg, Helen Joseph Hospital, and Hoërskool Vorentoe. Just east of Chiselhurst Drive and north of the southwestern end of St. Swinthin's and Auckland Avenues, in the latter case very old ones.

Rossmore was founded on September 9, 1925, and was laid out on Braamfontein Farm. The suburb is named in honor of Lord Derrick Westenra, 5th Baron Rossmore's only daughter, Dame Mary Bailey, the second wife of the mining magnate, Sir Abe Bailey. In the early years, it had a largely even balance between Afrikaans and English speakers, but the transition from Rand Afrikaans University to the University of Johannesburg shifted the population toward a largely black, English- and Zulu-speaking one.

== Sources ==
- Potgieter, D.J. (ed.) (1972). Standard Encyclopaedia of Southern Africa. Cape Town: Nasionale Opvoedkundige Uitgewery (Nasou).
- Stals, Prof. Dr. E.L.P (ed.) (1978). Afrikaners in die Goudstad, vol. 1: 1886 - 1924. Cape Town/Pretoria: HAUM.
