= Rossmore =

Rossmore may refer to:

== Places and structures ==
=== Australia ===
- Rossmore, New South Wales, a suburb of Sydney
- Rossmore, Queensland, a neighbourhood in the Gympie Region

=== Ireland ===
- Rossmore, County Cork, a village; see Kilmeen and Rossmore
- Rossmore Island, County Kerry
- Rossmore Forest Park, park in County Monaghan
- Rossmore Castle, 19th century country house in County Monaghan
- Rossmore, County Tipperary, village and townland

=== South Africa ===
- Rossmore, Johannesburg, a suburb

=== United Kingdom ===
- Rossmore, a suburb of Ellesmere Port, Cheshire
- Rossmore, a townland in Belleek, County Fermanagh
- Rossmore, Dorset, a suburb of Poole

=== United States ===
- Rossmore Apartment House, historic building in Louisville, Kentucky
- Rossmore, West Virginia, an unincorporated community

== Other uses ==
- Baron Rossmore, a title in the Peerage of Ireland (with a list of holders of that title)
- Clonoulty–Rossmore GAA, a Gaelic games club in County Tipperary, Ireland

== See also ==
- Rossmoor (disambiguation)
