= Rossmoor =

Rossmoor can refer to several places in the United States:

- Rossmoor, California, in Orange County
- Rossmoor, Walnut Creek, California, a gated community in Contra Costa County
- Rossmoor, Maryland
- Rossmoor, New Jersey

== See also ==
- Rossmore (disambiguation)
