= South African Republic Police =

The South African Republic Police (Dutch: Zuid-Afrikaansche Republiek Politie; ZARP) was the police force of the former country, South African Republic, one of two Internationally recognized Boer countries of the mid 19th to early 20th century. The Boers often called the South African Republic by its acronym ZAR (Zuid-Afrikaansche Republiek) while in the English-speaking world the republic was generally known as the Transvaal (after the region and territories it encompassed across the Vaal River). Members of the police force were known as ZARPs. After the Union of South Africa was established in 1910, the force was incorporated into the South African Police Force.

== A para-military force ==
The ZARP was the mounted and foot police of the ZAR, a nation that was mainly rural with a strong frontier spirit as the Boers had only arrived in the Transvaal less than 50 years before during the Great Trek. The ZARP were established as a para-military police force whose primary function was to uphold the authority of the state, rather than upholding justice. The Boers were only a minority in the ZAR, and greatly feared the black majority, hence the emphasis on the ZARP as a para-military force intended more to inspire fear than respect. From 1881 to 1896 the ZARPs were part of the Artillery and then began a separate existence as an independent entity. The basis of the ZAR's military was the kommando system, under which all able-bodied white men could be called up for military service in the event of an emergency. The professional military of the Transvaal consisted of the Staatsartillerie (State Artillery), who in 1899 numbered 314 men. The para-military ZARPs comprised the closest the ZAR had to a professional infantry and cavalry. The ZARPs were divided into three sections; the Foot, Mounted and Native sections. Through the ZARPs were known to the burghers as the "disciplined force of the Transvaal", the ZARPs like the Staatsartillerie had serious disciplinary problems.

== The Witwatersrand gold rush ==
In 1886, gold was discovered in the Witwatersrand, leading to the Witwatersrand Gold Rush that transformed the Transvaal from a poor, mainly rural republic into a wealthy state that began to urbanise. The boomtown of Johannesburg had emerged, becoming a city in less than a year. The gold rush attracted a vast number of uitlanders (Afrikaans for "outlanders"), the disparaging term used by the Boers to describe the foreigners who arrived in the Transvaal during the Witwatersrand Gold Rush who quickly became the majority in the new city of Johannesburg. Johannesburg was a highly multicultural city, being made up of people from all over the world, and as such greatly resented by the Boers, who feared becoming more of a minority in their own country. Before the gold rush, the ZAR had essentially no police force, with a system of night watchmen serving as the police force with justice being handled by the landdrost (magistrate), assisted by the wyksmeester (warden) who ran the local jail. In the event of a serious crime, the local field cornet would call out the kommando to handle the matter.

The founding of Johannesburg with its hundreds of thousands of miners drawn from all over South Africa and the world led to hundreds of bars, gambling houses and brothels being opened in the new city. For the Boers, a mostly rural people whose values were those of an ultra-conservative strain of Calvinism, the new city of Johannesburg together with its associated vices came as a considerable shock. The Boers regarded Johannesburg with its bars, brothels and gambling houses as the "new Babylon" that had unfortunately emerged on the highveld, a place of vice and immorality that needed to be brought under control. A particular obsession was the selling of alcohol to the black miners with one white British women living in Johannesburg, Florence Philips, described the black miners under the influence of alcohol as being "more like demons than men, or the smiling cheery creatures one had always been accustomed to see". The belief that was frequently expressed—that black men would engage in criminal acts while drunk—led to urgent demands from the white community of Johannesburg for the creation of a regime for policing the black community. To provide a means of controlling of the new city that had emerged on the highveld, the ZAR government created the ZARPs in September 1886 with a German immigrant, Karl Frederich von Brandis, being appointed the first police commissioner.

In July 1887, Brandis reported to Pretoria that owing to the unregulated state of the brothels of Johannesburg that syphilis was reaching epidemic status, leading to him to ask for permission to intern the "sick whores" as he called them in a medical facility before more were infected. When there was no response, Brandis sent another telegram threatening to send the "lewd women here infected with vuilziekte (syphilis)" to Pretoria, leading the ZAR state attorney-general to reluctantly to grant permission for the ZARPs to provide a medical facility for the treatment of prostitutes, albeit with the orders to keep the costs of such a facility as low as possible. Besides for prostitution, the ZARPs were much concerned with attempting to prevent the sale of alcohol to blacks. Lieutenant Gerard Van Dam of the ZARPs blamed the illegal alcohol canteens selling to blacks on "low class Russians or Polish Jews", who he claimed were the only people in the ZAR who were unscrupulous enough to sell alcohol to the black miners.

== Power relations ==
The ZARPs were notorious for their ill-discipline and brutality towards uitlanders. That the business life of Johannesburg came to dominated by the uitlanders was a source of much resentment for the Boers. Different fields of business came to be dominated by various uitlander groups with the Ashkenazim (Yiddish-speaking Jews from Eastern Europe) owning most of the businesses that sold supplies to the mining companies and the gold prospectors; Greeks owning the majority of the restaurants and cafes of Johannesburg; and most of the grocery stores of Johannesburg were owned by Indians and Chinese. For the 900 or so men serving in the ZARP, police duties were at least in part a way to assert power and to remind the uitlanders that the Transvaal was "their" country. Even worse was the treatment given to "Coloureds" (people of mixed race descent) and blacks whom the ZARPs greatly hated. Floggings of blacks by the ZARPs were such a regular occurrence in Johannesburg that one British journalist, Edward Mathers, wrote in his 1887 book The Gold Fields Revisited that: "It is one of the favourite 'sights' at Johannesburg to have a look at the morning floggings". On 29 December 1889, when a black miner was publicity flogged in Johannesburg's central square for being absent at work without permission, the Johannesburg Observer reported that his entire back from the neck down was "one mass of raw flesh", calling the flogging a "horrible and bloodcurdling" sight. In 1892, the District Surgeon for Johannesburg reported that he overseen 6,869 floggings over the course of the past year. Initially reserved for blacks, in May 1892 the law was amended to make people of all races liable for lashings.

Among the vast number of people who arrived in Johannesburg in connection with the gold rush were a number of Chinese, who were not welcome in the ZAR. In September 1891, a Chinese merchant named Mankam was beaten by a ZARP in Johannesburg central market while shopping for vegetables for himself and his family. Under a signed oath, 34 other Chinese stated that Mankam was merely shopping when the ZARP attacked him with a baton and kicked so harshly as to break several of his ribs. The case was brought up before the local landdrost who dismissed the charges of assault as he ruled that Mankam had shopping in area of the marketplace reserved for the whites and the ZARP had merely doing his duty when he ordered Mankam to shop in the Asian section of the marketplace. Under a law passed by the volksraad (people's council) of 8 September 1893, all "Chinamen" as the law called Chinese were required to have a special pass to allow them to live in the ZAR that was to cost £25 per year, and allow the ZARPs to imprison any Chinese found without the pass or an invalid one. Starting in 1889, the ZARPs forced the Chinese community to the western side of Johannesburg, and in 1894 a law was formally passed stating all Chinese as of 1 August 1894 had to live in a neighborhood of west Johannesburg and would require a pass to be allowed out of the designated neighborhood. Other laws passed by the volksraad stated that the Chinese were not permitted to walk on pavements or footpaths; were not allowed to ride public carriages; were excluded from the first and second class section of the railroad passenger cars; and were forbidden to have possess or consume alcohol. In October 1897, the volksraad banned all Asians from the Johannesburg central marketplace, claiming that they spread infectious diseases that threatened the health of the white residents.

The ZARPs were noted for their tendency to use weapons as a method of first resort rather than a method of last resort, especially when it to dealing with blacks and uitlanders, leading to a number of incidents where people were shot down by the ZARPs on the streets of Johannesburg. A Johannesburg newspaper that supported the government of President Paul Kruger complained in 1898 about the "indiscriminate reckless firing by foolish young constables". The ZARPs were recruited from the poorest elements of the urban Transvaal Boer society who needed to feel superior to blacks, and were much given to whippings and shootings. The largest contingents amongst the uitlanders were people from Britain and Australia, and several of the Anglo uitlanders wished to see the ZAR annexed as a British colony. British uitlanders approved of the treatment of Indian merchants by the ZARPs, seeing them as economic competitors. Fiddes, an agent for Alfred Milner, the British high commissioner for South Africa, visited Johannesburg to tell several Anglo uitlander community leaders that the British government intended to make an issue of the treatment of the Indians, and asked them not to support the ZAR government in their public statements. Fiddes, speaking on behalf of Milner told them that however much they approved of discrimination against the Indians that this was a useful way to spark diplomatic friction between the Transvaal and Britain that might lead to a war.

The Transvaal was governed by the pass system-a precursor of apartheid-under which blacks, coloreds and Asians were confided to certain districts and needed a pass from the government in order to leave. On 29 October 1898, the ZARPs raided a Johannesburg neighborhood inhabited by Cape Coloureds from the Cape colony, claiming that the community had violated the pass system by being built on land meant for whites. During the eviction, some 40 people were forced out of their homes at night to be beaten and whipped, and a child died as a result of the injuries she had endured. As the colored people were from the Cape colony, making them into British subjects, the eviction led to a formal diplomatic note of protest from Edmund Fraser, who represented the British government in Pretoria. Fraser warned Jan Smuts, the attorney-general of the ZAR, that "England would not longer accept the maladministration and especially about the ill-treatment of her subjects which was worse here that elsewhere. On this point England would take action". Fraser concluded that his government was prepared to go to war over the issue, a remark that struck Smuts as highly ominous.

Shortly afterwards, in January 1899, a British Uitlander named Thomas Edgar was shot dead by a ZARP while resisting arrest inside of his Johannesburg house, an incident that attracted immense media attention in Britain, where the British press portrayed the shooting as a case of the cold-blooded murder of an innocent Englishman killed in front of his wife. Edgar, a boilermaker from Bootle, Lancashire had settled in Johannesburg, attracted by the high wages that made it possible for him to enjoy a standard of living four times higher than was possible in Britain. He was a muscular and burly man standing at 6'4, and had a reputation as a troublemaker. Edgar, coming home drunk one night was involved in a brawl with another Englishman that was mistakenly reported to the ZARPs as a murder as Edgar beat the other man senseless. When the ZARPs kicked in the door of Edgar's house to arrest him, he tried to strike one with an iron rod, leading for Constable Barend Jones to shoot him dead. The facts of the incident became less important than the reaction it generated in the uitlander community, who felt that the ZARPs were hostile towards them. Several leaders of the uitlander community seized upon the case as a way to involve the British government. The English language newspapers in Johannesburg portrayed the shooting of Edgar as a vicious murder, and the Edgar Relief Community was founded to agitate for changes in the ZAR. Protests began in the uitlander community and a petition was presented to the British vice-consul in Johannesburg, demanding that Britain intervene to end what they called the systematic oppression by the ZARPs. In response to the British pressure, Constable Jones was tried for murder, but acquitted in February 1899 with the judge Antoine Klock ruling that Jones had a legitimate reasons to enter Edgar's house without a warrant and to shoot him in self-defense.

== The Boer war ==
The ZARPs came to be portrayed in Britain and elsewhere in the British empire as an oppressive police force that was persecuting the British uitlanders. In a book written in 1899 to justify Canada's involvement in the Boer war, the Canadian author Emerson Bristol Biggar wrote: "Drunken ZARPs (policemen) swagger about brandishing revolvers, occasionally shooting down poor natives for a trifle, and insulting Uitlanders (who are not allowed to carry arms), whenever an excuse offers. The killing of Edgar by a squad of ZARPs who broke into his house and murdered him in bed as he was talking to his wife, is a notorious example. The murderers were arrested, tried, acquitted and some of them promoted. Such was the municipal condition of Johannesburg up to the present crisis." In the same book, Bigger also condemned the ZARPs for their inability to end the sale of alcohol to blacks, writing "the Boer government of the Transvaal stands condemned by the liquor traffic".

In 1899, the force consisted of 10 officers, 100 NCO's and 1400 men. The majority of the force was foot police but they all took to the field and entered the Second Boer War as mounted forces. The ZARPs fought well and earned a reputation for their tenacity, skill and courage. In peacetime they carried swords, carbines and revolvers. During the Anglo-Boer war the ZARPs carried the Mauser rifle.

Leo Amery stated that “the police were first-class fighters, combining the skill of the Boer with the courage and self-sacrifice of the disciplined soldier”. Arthur Conan Doyle wrote that the ZARPs were "bullies in peace, but were certainly heroes in war". The “fighting” ZARPs accompanied the Boer forces from the ZAR that invaded Natal. They participated in many major and minor engagements but gained enduring fame at the Battle of Bergendal where they were destroyed as a unit. Individual members as well as the last contingent of the ZARPs continued to fight in the ZAR during the guerrilla and final stage of the Second Boer War. The British historian Thomas Pakenham wrote about the way that British image of the ZARPs completely changed as: "How ironic that the notorious “bully boys” of Johannesburg, the epitome of the brutal Boer, who had helped precipitate the war by shooting Tom Edgar, should now come to be regarded by the British as heroes cast in their own mould."

== Books and articles ==
- Bristol Biggar, Emerson (1899). The Boer War Its Causes and Its Interest to Canadians: with a Glossary of Cape Dutch and Kaffir Terms. Toronto: Samuel Biggar. ISBN 9780665264979.
- Callinicos, Luli (1980). A People's History of South Africa: Working life, 1886-1940. Johannesburg: Ravan Press.
- Cammack, Diana Rose (1990). The Rand at War, 1899-1902 The Witwatersrand and the Anglo-Boer War. Los Angeles: University of California Press. ISBN 9780852550625.
- Pakenham, Thomas (1979). The Boer War. London: Weidenfeld & Nicolson. ISBN 0394427424.
- Muller, Cornelis Hermanus (2016). Policing the Witwatersrand: A history of the South African Republic Police, 1886-1899. Bloemfontein: University of the Free State.
- Onselen, Charles van (2001). New Babylon, New Nineveh Everyday Life on the Witwatersrand 1886-1914. London: Jonathan Ball. ISBN 9781868421114.
- Sauerman, Adri; Meyer, Michael; Kutnak Ivković, Sanja (2019). "Exploring the Relation between Support for Community Policing and Police Integrity in South Africa". Exploring Police Integrity Novel Approaches to Police Integrity Theory and Methodology. Oxford: Springer. pp. 111–137. ISBN 9783030290658.
- Yap, Melanie; Leong Man, Dianne (1996). Colour, Confusion and Concessions The History of the Chinese in South Africa. Hong Kong: Hong Kong University Press. ISBN 9789622094246.
- Waag, Ian van der (January 2005). "Boer Generalship and the Politics of Command". War in History. 12 (1): 15–43. doi:10.1191/0968344505wh306oa.
