= South African Republic =

1852–1902 Boer republic in Southern Africa

South African Republic Zuid-Afrikaansche Republiek
- 1852–1902, 1914–1915
- Flag Coat of arms
- Motto: "Eendragt maakt magt" Unity makes strength
- Anthem: "Volkslied van Transvaal"
- Status: Largely independent state under British suzerainty (1852-1902)
- Capital: Pretoria
- 1858–1860; 1880–1881 (exile): Potchefstroom; Heidelberg
- Official language: Dutch
  - Common languages: English, Afrikaans, Pedi and other Bantu languages
- Religion: Dutch Reformed Church (Note: Dutch: Nederduitsch Hervormde Kerk van Afrika (NHK))
- Demonyms: Transvaaler; South African
- Government: Parliamentary republic
- President of the Executive Council
  - 1857–1860: Marthinus W. Pretorius
  - 1860–1862: Stephanus Schoeman
  - 1862–1864: W. C. J. van Rensburg
  - 1864–1866: Marthinus W. Pretorius
- State President
  - 1866–1871: Marthinus W. Pretorius
  - 1872–1877: Thomas F. Burgers
  - 1883–1902: Paul Kruger
  - 1900–1902 (acting): Schalk Willem Burger
- State Secretary
  - 1880–1888: Willem Eduard Bok
  - 1888–1898: Willem Johannes Leyds
  - 1898–1902: Francis William Reitz
- Legislature: Volksraad

Establishment
  - Sand River Convention: 17 January 1852
  - Civil War: 7 October 1862
  - Transvaal Colony: 12 April 1877
  - First Boer War: 12 December 1880
  - Pretoria Convention: 3 August 1881
  - London Convention: 27 February 1884
  - Second Boer War: 11 October 1899
  - Treaty of Vereeniging: 31 May 1902
  - Maritz rebellion: Sep 1914 – Feb 1915

Area
  - Total: 191,789 km^{2} (74,050 sq mi)

Population
  - 1897: 867,941
- Currency: South African pound
Preceded by
Klein Vrystaat
Nieuwe Republiek
Republic of Zoutpansberg
Republic of Lydenburg
Potchefstroom
Ohrigstad
Succeeded by
Transvaal Colony
- Today part of: South Africa; Eswatini

The South African Republic (Dutch: Zuid-Afrikaansche Republiek, abbreviated ZAR; Afrikaans: Suid-Afrikaanse Republiek), also known as the Transvaal Republic, was a landlocked independent Boer republic in Southern Africa which existed from 1852 to 1902, when it was annexed into the British Empire as a result of the Second Boer War.

The ZAR was established as a result of the 1852 Sand River Convention, in which the British government agreed to formally recognise the independence of the Boers living north of the Vaal River. Relations between the ZAR and Britain started to deteriorate after the British Cape Colony expanded into the Southern African interior, eventually leading to the outbreak of the First Boer War between the two nations. The Boer victory confirmed the ZAR's independence; however, Anglo-ZAR tensions soon flared up again over various diplomatic issues. In 1899, war again broke out between Britain and the ZAR, which was swiftly occupied by British forces. Many Boer combatants in the ZAR refused to surrender, leading British commander Lord Kitchener to order the adoption of several scorched-earth policies and concentration camps. In the treaty which ended the war, the ZAR was transformed into the Transvaal Colony, and eventually the Union of South Africa. During World War I, there was a failed attempt at resurrecting the republic in the Maritz rebellion.

The land area that was once the ZAR now comprises all or most of the provinces of Gauteng, Limpopo, Mpumalanga, and North West in the northeastern portion of the modern-day Republic of South Africa.

== Name and etymology ==
In 1853 the Volksraad adopted a resolution briefly adopting the name of the Zuid Afrikaansche Republiek (South African Republic). The same year, the Volksraad renamed the state the Zuid-Afrikaansche Republiek Benoorden de Vaalrivier (South African Republic to the North of the Vaal River). In 1858, the constitution permanently established the name of the country as the Zuid Afrikaansche Republiek. The ZAR was also commonly referred to as Transvaal in reference to the area beyond (or "trans") the Vaal River, including by the British and European press. The British objected to the use of the name Zuid Afrikaansche Republiek. After the end of the First Boer War, the ZAR came under British suzerainty and in the Pretoria Convention of 3 August 1881, the British insisted on the use of the name Transvaal State over Zuid Afrikaansche Republiek. This convention was renegotiated in a subsequent treaty between Britain and the ZAR, the London Convention of 27 February 1884, where Britain acquiesced to the ZAR's demands to revert to the use of the previous name.

The name of the South African Republic was of such political significance that on 1 September 1900, the British declared by special proclamation that the name of the country had been changed from Zuid Afrikaansche Republiek to "the Transvaal". This proclamation was issued during the British occupation of the region in the Second Boer War and while the ZAR was still nominally an independent country.

On 31 May 1902, the Treaty of Vereeniging was signed with the government of the South African Republic, the Orange Free State government, and the British government, ending the war, and converted the ZAR into the Transvaal Colony. Following the establishment of the Union of South Africa in 1910, the Transvaal Colony became Transvaal Province. The name Transvaal was finally changed in 1994, when the post-apartheid African National Congress-dominated South African government broke up the province into four provinces and renamed the core region Gauteng.

== History ==
=== Great Trek ===
The Boer republics emerged when the British had annexed the Cape Colony from the Dutch in 1806, in order to prevent the sea routes to the East (India etc.) from falling to Napoleon. This area was inhabited by the Boers, who, dissatisfied with British rule, decided to leave the colony and move into the hinterland of South Africa in what became the Great Trek. These Boers then settled these lands, becoming farmers.

The South African Republic had its origins from a group of Voortrekkers that split in 1835 with the group leaving going to Zoutpansberg, and the group led by Hendrik Potgieter remaining at the Vet river and founded the town of Winburg which would become the nucleus of the early South African Republic.

=== Early Republic ===
The ZAR in 1890.

A territorial claim over the core of the ZAR's area was established in 1837 when the commandos of Potgieter and Piet Uys defeated a Matabele raiding party of Mzilikazi and drove them back over the Limpopo river. Potgieter declared the lands north and south of the Vaal river as Boer lands. Boers started settling on both sides of the Vaal river and in March 1838, Potgieter, Uys and the men of their commando provided relief to Gerrit Maritz, and early in April 1838, Uys and his son were killed. During April 1838 Potgieter returned to the area north of the Vaal river and founded the town of Potchefstroom. At this time, this new country included the area north (Potchefstroom) and south (Winburg) of the Vaal river.

In 1848 the British Governor of the Cape, Sir Harry Smith, issued a proclamation declaring British sovereignty over all the lands to the north and to the south of the Vaal river. Commandant-General Andries Pretorius led the commandos against the British forces later that year, leading to the Battle of Boomplaats on 29 August 1848, in which the British emerged victorious. The Volksraad from Winburg was transferred to Potchefstroom and the South African Republic (Dutch: Zuid-Afrikaansche Republiek; the ZAR) was established as the name of the new country.

=== Establishment ===
The South African Republic came into existence on 17 January 1852, when the British signed the Sand River Convention treaty with about 40,000 Boer people, recognising their independence in the region to the north of the Vaal River, which had previously been under British annexation as the Orange Rivers Sovereignty.

The first president of the ZAR was Marthinus Wessel Pretorius, elected in 1857, son of Boer leader Andries Pretorius, who commanded the Boers to victory at the Battle of Blood River. The capital was established at Potchefstroom and later moved to Pretoria. The parliament was called the Volksraad and had 24 members.

=== Relations with Portuguese Mozambique ===
The South African Republic bordered Portuguese Mozambique, and the Portuguese port city of Lourenço Marques grew out of trade with the republic as its main export port, but the difficult route to it could only be solved through the construction of a railway. In 1869, the republic signed a treaty with Portugal settling the border with Portuguese Mozambique, in which it acknowledged Portuguese sovereignty over the Maputo Bay and the surrounding territory as far as the Lebombo Mountains.

Britain contested Portuguese control of the bay, but through international arbitration the MacMahon award gave the Delagoa bay to the Portuguese in 1875, who were friendly to the Boers.

The Transvaal government immediately took steps to acquire a loan to build a railway there, and even led discussions to purchase the bay outright. That same year, Portugal and the South African Republic signed another agreement to build a railroad between Pretoria and Lourenço Marques, a similar one being signed with the Orange Free State the following year.

This railway and purchase would lose the British the main control they had over Transvaal, since previously the British could at the very least restrict the supply of arms and ammunition that was exported and fell into the hands of the Boers and natives and thereby rein in what the British saw as the anarchy in the Transvaal. Additionally, the sea outlet that the Boers acquired which was outside the control of the British made persuading the Boers to enter a South African confederation far more difficult, as the Boers as a result achieved greater independence.

=== British annexation ===
By the 1870s, the British Secretary of State for the Colonies, Lord Carnarvon, adopted a policy of confederating South Africa, in order to solve the problems of a restless frontier and of containing the Boers, which both threatened their colonies of Natal and the Cape of Good Hope. These colonies were absolutely vital in providing a route to India, which was Britain's prime colony. Confederation of the South African region was thought to be very beneficial for the British, as it would "cheapen the administration of affairs" and reduce the need for imperial money and troops.

The first issue that prompted the annexation of Transvaal was the prospect that the Boers might gain an outlet to the sea, through Delagoa Bay which the British government was trying to prevent, as shown by the 1843 annexation of Natal, which had previously been a Boer republic called Natalia. The Foreign Office was further concerned that the opening of Delagoa Bay could signal the involvement of other nations in the Transvaal, which could threaten the Cape Colony. This concern was intensified by the fact that some German merchants had already approached Bismark with the proposition that he annex the Transvaal, which proposition, although rejected, raised the possibility of the Boers requesting German protection, which in turn raised the possibility of the appearance of a foreign and unfriendly power in the Cape which could threaten Britain's position there. These fears were further stoked by the trip that Thomas Burgers, the president of Transvaal took to Europe, during which he tried to negotiate a loan for a railway, as well as possible European alliances.

The second issue that prompted the annexation was native policy and Boer relations with local African kingdoms. The British considered these relations a problem ever since the founding of the ZAR. Only one year after the Sand Rivers Convention, the Lieutenant-Governor of Natal, Benjamin Pine, reported that the Boers had interpreted the treaty as having placed the Zulu Kingdom under their exclusive control. Pine stated that such a union of the Zulus and the Boers, who had wanted to create a settlement in the North-West corner of Zululand, would imperil the safety of Natal. This combination meant that control of the land around the areas of Utrecht would be in dispute between the Boers and the Zulus, raising tension in the region. The Boers had also been acting provocatively towards the Bantu peoples living in Bechuanaland: for instance, in 1852, Boer commandos raided the town of Kwena, taking many prisoners, and in 1857 a Boer commandos led another raid on Batlhaping, after claiming that the tribesmen stole their cattle. For the British, these conflicts had a high chance for escalating and presented big problems no matter how they turned out: if the Boers won in their war against the Zulus, there would be a substantial increase of Zulu refugees into the already crowded area of Natal, and the displacement of peoples had been shown to create an atmosphere conducive to war, as shown by the Xhosa wars). If the Zulus won, other independent tribes such as the Bantu, the Pondo, Swazi, Bapedi, and others, would gain confidence that they might obtain their independence from the British or at least offer the British resistance, endangering the Cape Colony. Annexation was therefore the only way of preventing either of these outcomes.

What precipitated action and confirmed the aforementioned fears was that in 1876, war broke out between the Boers and the Bapedi chief Sekhukhune. Initially, the Boers faced heavy defeats: the Republic was close to bankruptcy and its siege of Sekhukhune's stronghold failed because commando members objected to Burgers's theology, calling him a heretic, and abandoned the siege in droves. Sir Henry Barkley exaggerated this failure as a major and decisive defeat of the Boers, and was thereby led to anticipate an immediate application to the High Commissioner to take over the country. A.N. Pelzer wrote: "Although Sekhukhune made overtures for peace, he was not defeated and this fact, together with the shaky financial position, gave Sir Theophilus Shepstone the pretext he required to annex the republic [as the Transvaal, a British colony, on 12 April 1877]." Barkly's warning hastened the action of Lord Carnarvon and led to the dispatch of Sir Theophilus Shepstone, who happened to be in England, on his mission as special commissioner "to carry out any negotiations which may be found necessary and practicable." Shepstone's warrant authorised him to annex the Transvaal, provided he was satisfied that a sufficient number of the inhabitants, or the legislature, desired it. By the time Shepstone arrived, however, the Bapedi and the Boers had signed a peace treaty. However, this conflict cannot be lightly dismissed as "the picturesque pretext" for annexation. In spite of the Boer "victory," on 16 February 1877, the Boers and Bapedi, mediated by Alexander Merensky, signed a peace treaty at Botshabelo). Nonetheless, the situation could not be described as anything but critical. The war had been expensive, leading the government of the Republic to be insolvent, and the desertion of Boer commandos gave the Zulus, the arch-enemies of the Boers, the impression that the Transvaal was weak, as they had been barely able to defeat Sekhukhune, who they considered a minor vassal. In the spring and summer of 1876–77, frontier skirmishes between the Zulus and Boers flared up once again, and Cetewayo, the Zulu king, began moving his impis towards the border between the Transvaal and Zululand.

Believing that the only answer to the instability of the region was British intervention, senior War Office official Sir Garnet Wolseley argued that Britain should "use Cetewayo as a powerful lever to influence wavering spirit". It has therefore been suggested that the danger that the Zulus presented was specifically manufactured by the British to induce the Boers to accept annexation, and the impis had been massed on the border "on a hint from Shepstone". This suggestion is supported by the presence of Zulu emissaries in March 1877 in Natal stating that the Zulu army had massed "in readiness at the call of Somtseu (Shepstone) to go round towards the upper side of the Dutch." Moreover, Shepstone requested Sir Henry Bulwer, the British Lieutenant-Governor of Natal, to cease the importation of military materiel into the Transvaal.

However, the independence of the Zulu kingdom must not be understated, and the influence that Shepstone had over Cetewayo should not be exaggerated. What kept the Zulus loyal to the British was their fear of the Boers: but once the Zulus realized that the Boers were not a threat, they realised that they did not need to acquiesce to British demands. This is shown by the response that Cetewayo made to the calls for peace from the Lieutenant-Governor of Natal: "I shall not act on my own account. I shall not agree to any laws or rules from Natal." Writing on 14 February 1877, Shepstone asserted: "While I am here, Cetewayo will do nothing; but if I were to withdraw without completing my mission[annexation], I believe that not only the Zulus but every native tribe in the Transvaal and bordering on it would attack and wipe it out." The danger of a Zulu attack was therefore very real, and not invented by the British. However, the British did apply pressure on the Boers to excite apprehensions of the danger the Zulus presented by cutting off Boer access to the coast, which prevented them from profiting from customs duties on maritime imports and exports, as well as cutting off their source of arms, which contributed to their fear of a Zulu attack.

In 1877, Shepstone left Natal for Pretoria. He was warmly received by Burgers, the president of the Transvaal. Since the country was on the eve of an election which Burgers was bound to lose due to his unpopularity, Sir Theophilius therefore "was convinced beyond any doubt of Burgers' support against their common enemy: Kruger", since Kruger was Burger's primary rival in the election, against whom he could leverage the aid of the Natalian (Shepstone). Thomas Burgers hoped to use the presence of Shepstone to induce the Volksraad to accept, as an alternative to annexation, a reform to the constitution that would strengthen his executive authority and prolong his rule by two more years. Even when Shepstone informed Burgers of his determination to go through with annexing the Transvaal, Burgers assured Shepstone of his co-operation.

It is argued by some that Shepstone had annexed the area in haste, "without troubling to ascertain the real drift of Dutch opinion." However, his decision was certainly not made in haste, as he remained in Pretoria for three months before making a proclamation of annexation, at which time he was in contact with the members of the community in Pretoria. Moreover, due to the economic depression, as well as the "incurable insolvency" of the government, the burghers were ready to support the annexation, which was expected to solve these problems, whilst providing them protection from the natives. Additionally, the state attorney, Dr Jorissen, opined that, had Shepstone summoned the Volksraad after annexation, he would have obtained a vote of confidence.

At Pretoria the annexation was received quietly enough. The republican printing press (De Volksstem) made no difficulty over the printing of Shepstone's proclamation. Despite the official protest of the executive council, all but one of its members retained office under the new administration, and no military incidents occurred during or immediately after the annexation. Sir Garnet Wolseley, High Commissioner for Southeast Africa, declared war on Sekhukhune. With British and allied troops, including the Swazis who had supported Burgers, in 1879 Wolseley defeated Sekhukhune and imprisoned him in Pretoria. With the Bapedi threat removed, the Burghers were no longer so amenable to British rule.

On 13 December 1880, the members of the last Volksraad were summoned to a meeting at Paardekraal. The meeting placed authority in the hands of a triumvirate: Paul Kruger, Piet Joubert, and Marthinus Wessel Pretorius. They declared Heidelberg their seat of government and hoisted the Vierkleur there on 16 December. The war, not officially declared to the occupying British troops, opened with an irregular attack on a British regiment on the march at Bronkhorstspruit. The British garrisons in the Transvaal were besieged, but only one fell to the republicans.

The Boers defeated the British at Laing's Nek and Ingogo, and on 27 February 1881, at Majuba, General Sir George Pomeroy Colley fell at the head of his troops. While the British would in other circumstances have sent more troops and defeated the rebels, Prime Minister William Gladstone chose to make peace. Drawing up of the detailed peace treaty—the Pretoria Convention—was left in the hands of a royal commission comprising Sir Hercules Robinson, General Sir Evelyn Wood and Justice John de Villiers of the Cape Colony. Britain now referred to the territory as the Transvaal State, but the Volksraad regarded the old South African Republic as having been restored.

=== Independence ===
The ZAR became fully independent on 27 February 1884, when the London Convention was signed. The country independently also entered into various agreements with other foreign countries after that date. On 3 November 1884 the country signed a postal convention with the government of the Cape Colony and later a similar convention with the Orange Free State.

In November 1859, the independent Republics of Lijdenburg and Utrecht merged with the ZAR. On 9 May 1887, burghers from the territories of Stellaland and Goosen (sometimes referred to as "Goshen") were granted the ZAR franchise. The ZAR incorporated the former Nieuwe Republiek (Republic of Vryheid) on 20 July 1888. On 25 July 1895, the burghers that took part in the battle at Zoutpansberg were granted citizenship of the ZAR.

== Constitution and laws ==
The constitution contained provisions for the division between the political leadership and office bearers in government administration. The legal system consisted of higher and lower courts and had adopted a jury system. Laws were enforced by the South African Republic Police (Zuid Afrikaansche Republiek Politie or ZARP) which were divided into Mounted Police (Rijdende Politie) and Foot Police.

Also established were municipal government, the Witwatersrand District Court and the High Court of Transvaal.

=== Demographics ===
The State Almanac for 1897 states that the total white population was 245,397; with the total black population being 622,544.

Statistics of White Population of the South African Republic
District	White		
District	Males	Females	Total
Barberton	3,500	2,900	6,400
Bloemhof	2,000	1,600	3,600
Boksburg	3,200	2,100	5,300
Carolina	2,500	1,200	3,700
Ermelo	2,700	1,850	4,650
Heidelberg	5,770	2,050	7,820
Johannesburg (town)	32,387	18,520	50,907
Johannesburg (neighbourhood)	4,000	2,500	6,500
Krugersdorp	10,600	9,950	20,450
Lichtenburg	3,600	3,000	6,500
Lydenburg	1,600	1,250	2,750
Marico	3,600	3,000	6,500
Middelburg	5,500	4,000	9,500
Piet-Retief	600	660	1,160
Potchefstroom	12,600	12,300	24,900
Pretoria	15,700	14,600	30,300
Rustenburg	5,600	5,000	10,600
Standerton	3,600	3,750	7,550
Utrecht	1,750	1,100	2,860
Vrijheid	2,640	2,520	5,160
Wakkerstroom	6,000	6,700	11,700
Waterberg	2,600	2,300	4,900
Wolmaranstad	1,600	1,600	3,100
Zoutpansberg	4,500	4,200	8,700
Total	137,947	107,450	245,397

=== Religion ===
Like other Boer Republics, Transvaal was predominately Calvinist Protestant due to their Dutch heritage, and this played a significant role in their culture.

Initially, the state and church were not separated in the constitution; citizens of the ZAR had to be members of the Nederduitsch Hervormde Kerk, a denomination which had broken from the Dutch Reformed Church. In 1858, these clauses were altered in the constitution to allow for the Volksraad to approve other Dutch Calvinist churches. that separated from the Dutch Reformed Church in the wake of a number of splits. This included the Dopper Church was approved by the Volksraad in 1858, which had the effect of allowing Paul Kruger, a Dopper himself, to remain a citizen of the ZAR. Members of the Roman Catholic Church and other Christian churches were not allowed to become citizens of the ZAR.

The Bible itself was also often used to interpret the intention of legal documents. The Bible was also used to interpret a prisoner exchange agreement, reached in terms of the Sand River Convention, between a commando of the ZAR, led by Kruger, and a Commando of the Orange Free State. President Jacobus Nicolaas Boshoff had issued a death sentence over two ZAR citizens, for treason. Kruger argued with President Boshoff that the Bible said punishment does not mean a death sentence and at the prisoner exchange, it was agreed that the accused would be punished if found guilty. After consulting Commandant Kruger's Bible, Boshoff commuted the men's sentences to lashes with a sjambok.

=== Citizenship ===
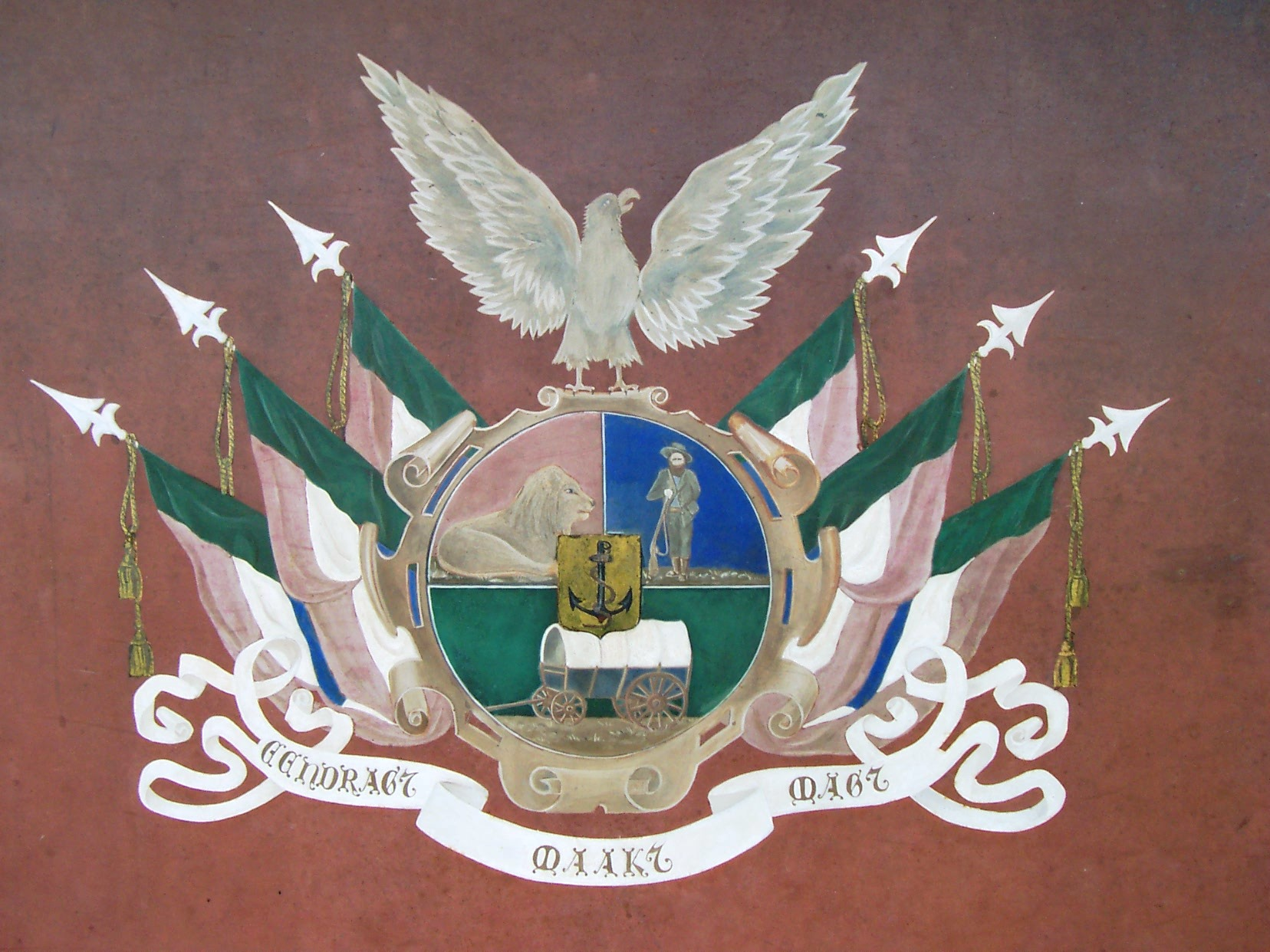
Coat of arms of the South African Republic displayed on Kruger's wagon

Citizenship of the ZAR was legislated by the constitution as well as Law No 7 of 1882, as amended on 23 June 1890. Citizenship was gained by being born in the republic or by naturalisation. The voting age was 16 years. Persons not born in the republic could become citizens by taking the prescribed oath and procuring the letters of naturalisation. The oath involved abandoning, discarding and renouncing all allegiance and subjugation towards foreign sovereignties and in particular their previous citizenship. Under a law of 1855, only white people were permitted to be citizens of the ZAR and to own land. The constitution of the ZAR stated: "The volk (people) are not prepared to allow any equality of the non-white with the white inhabitants, either in the church or the state".

The Witwatersrand gold rush led to an influx of Indians and Chinese into the new city of Johannesburg that was emerging on the veld, which led the volksraad to pass Law Number 3, which was aimed at stopping Asian immigration into the Transvaal. Under Law Number 3, all Asians which were defined as "Coolies, Chinese etc, Arabs, Malays, and Mohammedan subjects of the Turkish dominion" were forbidden from owning fixed property, had to register with the local magistrate within 8 days of arriving, were restricted to living in certain neighborhoods and had to pay an entry fee of £25. The Indian merchants, who were classified as "Arabs", objected to this law and appealed to the British government to protect their rights as British subjects. Following British diplomatic pressure, Law Number 3 was amended by the volksraad in 1887 to allow the "Asiatics" the right to own fixed property, though not land, and the entry fee was lowered to £3. Because the Indians in the ZAR had the British government to protect them, the anti-Asian laws in the ZAR tended to single out the Chinese, though the Hong Kong Chinese were like the Indians able to claim as British subjects certain exemptions from the anti-Chinese laws.

To be eligible for citizenship, white foreigners had to have been residing in the Republic for a period of two years, be of good character and have been accepted as member of the Dutch Reformed or Reformed Church. On 20 September 1893 the ZAR Constitution was amended so that two-thirds of the Volksraad would have to agree to changes to the citizenship law. This proclamation, No 224, also changed Law No 7 with regard to voting.

All citizens who were born in the ZAR or had obtained their franchise prior to 23 June 1890 would have the right to vote for both the first and second Volksraad and in all other elections. Citizens who obtained their franchise through naturalization after 23 June 1890 would be able to vote in all elections, except those for the first Volksraad. The total population of the republic in 1890 was an estimated 120,000 people.

== Military ==
In common with the Orange Free State, the basis of the military of the ZAR was the kommando system under which all able-bodied burghers could be called up for military service under their own elected officers. The men of the kommandos wore no uniforms and had no medals. The basic officer was the field cornet who was elected by the local burghers and performed both military and administrative functions in his district. The field cornet was responsible for collecting taxes, performing the census, training the male burghers, collecting arms and with upholding the power of the state over the local black population. The commander of the ZAR's military was the elected commandant-general who like the field cornets performed both military and political functions. The commandant-general was responsible for buying guns and ammunition, fixed the prices of commodities and most importantly controlled the ivory trade. The economy of the Transvaal was very much a barter economy, and ivory was one of the principal currencies used in trade and commerce. The professional military of the ZAR was the Staatsartillerie (State Artillery), who in 1899 numbered 314 men. The Staatsartillerie was armed with the modern Krupp artillery guns imported from Germany, and whose second-in-command was the Austrian officer Captain Adolf Zboril, who did his best to bring up the Staatsartillerie to the level of a European army. The closest the ZAR had to a professional infantry and cavalry was the para-military ZARP (Zuid-Afrikaansche Republiek Politie-South African Republic Police). In 1899, the ZAR had about 30,000 men who were called up to serve in the kommandos.

Though in theory, any white male burgher could be elected to a military office, in practice the men who were elected came from the wealthier families, who used their wealth to build up patronage networks that put the poorer farmers into their debt in one manner or another. The South African historian Ian van der Waag described Boer society as being characterized by a quasi-feudalism as the wealthier families set themselves up as something alike to the marcher lords of medieval Europe. The field cornets often waged war against local African natives in order to seize land, ivory and people to distribute as spoils to their constituents in exchange for their electoral support, often specifically for elections to higher republic offices. There was a strong dynastic element to the election of generals who commanded the kommandos as there was a tendency for men from the same families to be elected to the office of general generation after generation. In 1899, while the average age of a general in the ZAR was 58, the majority had a very limited education. In a society that venerated age, the most respected man was the takhaar, the wealthy patriarch with the long hair and long beard that indicated wisdom, and these were accordingly the people most likely to be elected as officers. Most of the takhaars serving as officers in 1899 were in some way connected to President Paul Kruger, either by ties of blood or marriage.

== Language ==
The language spoken and written by the citizens of the ZAR was a variant of Dutch, locally referred to as Hooghollands. On 3 October 1884, the Volksraad stated that they had reason to believe that in certain schools impure Dutch (in fact an early form of Afrikaans) was being used. The Volksraad issued Proclamation 207 and compelled the Superintendent of Education to apply the language law enforcing the exclusive use of Dutch. On 30 July 1888, Dutch language was declared the sole official language, in court as well as education, trade and general use. All other languages were declared "foreign".

These changes to the ZAR laws made the use of all other foreign languages illegal in the ZAR. On 1 October 1895 Alfred Fernandez Harington was appointed English master at the Staats Model School in Pretoria. Use of any foreign language was subject to criminal penalty and fine of £20 (ZAR) for each offence. The British similarly had declared English to be the only language spoken in the Cape Colony some decades earlier to outlaw the Dutch language. The discovery of gold in 1885 led to a major influx of foreigners. By 1896, the language of government and citizens remained Dutch but in many market places, shops and homes the English language was spoken.

== Military history ==
=== War with Mapela and Makapaan, 1854 ===
Hendrik Potgieter was elected at the assembly of 1849 as commandant general for life and it became necessary, to avoid strife, to appoint three commandants general all possessing equal powers. Commandant General Andries Pretorius became commandant general of the Potchefstroom and Rustenburg districts. On 16 December 1852, Andries died and his son, Piet Pretorius, was appointed as commandant general of the Lydenburg and Zoutpansberg districts in his stead.

There were some disputes over cattle which Mapela was raising on behalf of Potgieter and earlier Commandant Scholtz had confiscated a large number of rifles and amounts of ammunition, rifle repair equipment and materials of war from the home of an English missionary, the Reverend Livingstone. Livingstone admitted to storing weaponry for the Secheli, a breach of the Sand River Convention, which prohibited providing arms or ammunition to the natives.

In 1853, Herman Potgieter was called to Mapela to aid in a cull of the elephant population. Upon arrival, Maphela guided the Potgieter party, which included Herman, his son, his groom and a few other burghers to the purported location where the elephants were herding. Rather instead, Mapela led the unsuspecting Boers into an ambush where hundreds of native warriors attacked the Potgieter party, killing Andries, then proceeding to drag Herman up a hill, where he was skinned alive. They stopped once they had torn the entrails from his body. At the same time of these events, the Ndebele chief Magobane (known to the Boers as Makapaan) attacked and killed an entire convoy of women and children traveling to Pretoria. The two chiefs had concluded an agreement to murder all the Europeans in their respective districts and to keep the cattle that they were raising for the Europeans.

General Piet Potgieter set out with 100 men from Zoutpansberg and Commandant General Pretorius left Pretoria with 200 men. After the commandos met up, they first attacked Magobane and the natives were driven back to their caves in the mountains where they lived before. The Boers held them at siege in their caves and eventually hundreds of women and children came out.

Orphan children of the native tribes were booked in strictly controlled by legal process, at appointed Boer families to look after them until they came of age. The administration was similar to the system of indentured workers, which was simply another form of slavery, with the exception that children so registered had to be released at age 16. The commando would return all such children to the nearest landdrost district, for registration and allocation to a Boer family.

As there were slavers and other criminals dealing in children, any burgher found in possession of an unregistered minor child was guilty of a criminal offence. These children were also often called "oorlams" in reference to being overly used to the Dutch culture, and in reference to a hand-raised orphan sheep, or "hanslam". These children, even after their 16th birthday, and being free to come and go as they please, rarely re-connected with their own culture and own language and except for surviving and being cared for in terms of food and shelter, were basically forcefully divorced from their native tribe forever.

Among the casualties of this war was Commandant General Potgieter. The natives were armed with rifles and were good shots. The general was killed by a native sniper on the ridge of a trench and his body recovered by then commandant Paul Kruger whilst under heavy fire from the natives. What remained of the joint commando, now under command of General Pretorius focussed their attention on Mapela. By the time the commando had reached Mapela, the natives had fled. A few wagons, bloody clothes, chests and other goods were discovered at a kop near Mapela's town. Mapela and his soldiers escaped and with their rifles and ammunition intact and Mapela was only captured much later, in 1858.

=== Civil War, 1861–1864 ===
Commandant-General Stephanus Schoeman did not accept the Volksraad proclamation of 20 September 1858, under which members of the Reformed Churches of South Africa would be entitled to citizenship of the ZAR. Consequently, Paul Kruger was not accepted as a citizen and disallowed from political intercourse. Acting President van Rensburg called a special meeting of the general council of the Dutch Reformed Church, which then voted in a special resolution to allow members of the Reformed Church access to the franchise.

=== Sekhukune War, 1876 ===
In 1876, a war between the ZAR and the Bapedi broke out over cattle theft and land encroachment. The Volksraad declared war on the Pedi leader, Sekhukune, on 16 May 1876. The war only began in July 1876. The president of the ZAR, Burgers led an army of 2000 burghers and was joined by a strong force of Swazi warriors. The Swazis joined the war to aid Mampuru, who was ousted from his position of chieftain by Sekhukune.

One of the early battles occurred at Botsabelo Mission Station on 13 July 1876, against Johannes Dinkwanyane, who was Sekhukune's brother. The Boer forces were led by Commandant Coetzee and accompanied by Swazi warriors. The Swazi warriors launched a surprise and successful attack while the Boers held back. Seeing this, the Swazis refused to hand over to the Boers any spoils from the battle, thereafter leaving and returning to Swaziland. Dinkwanyane's followers also surrendered after this campaign.

=== First Boer War, 1880–1881 ===
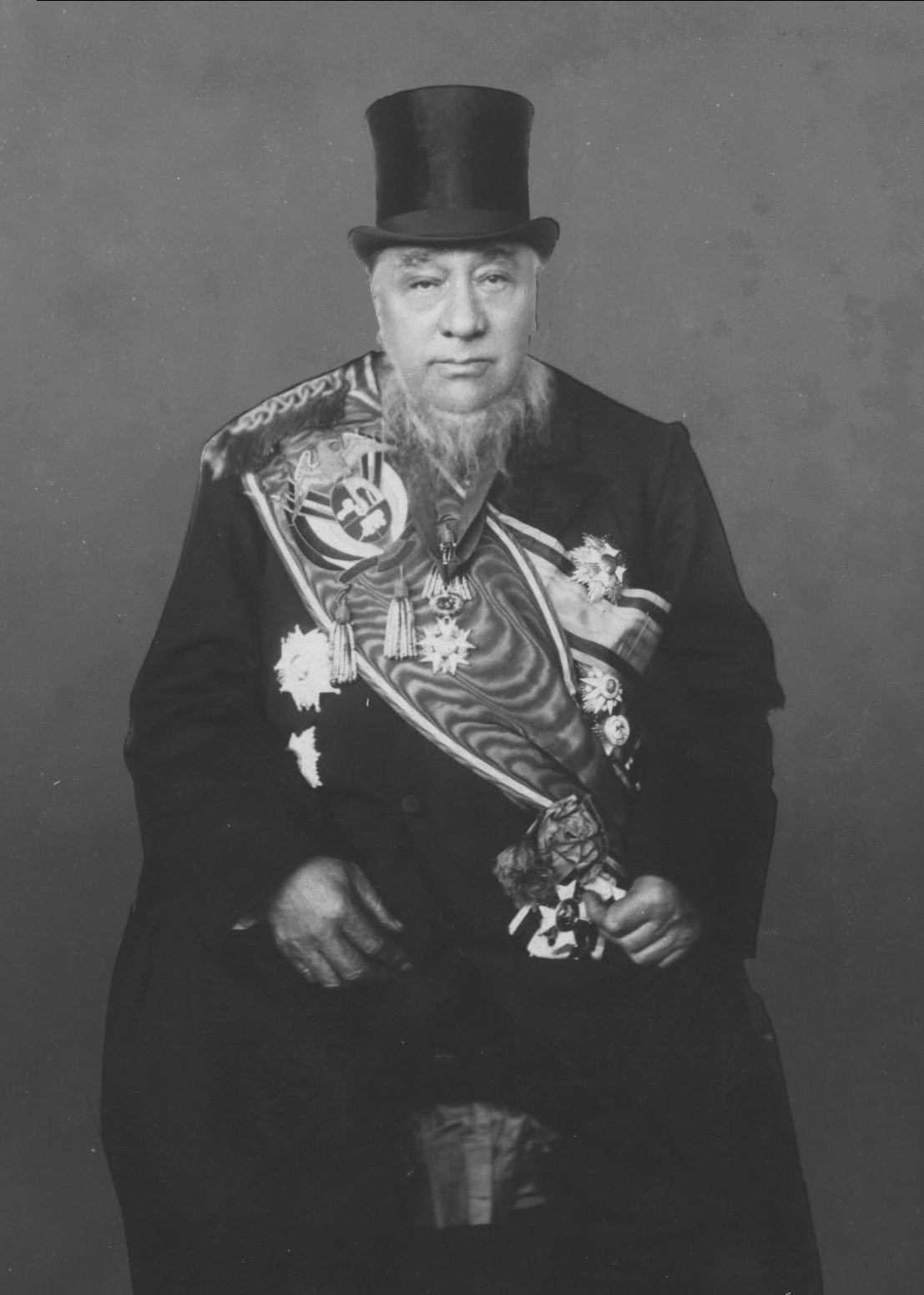
President Paul Kruger in 1898

On 12 April 1877, British officials issued the "Annexation of the S. A. Republic to the British Empire." The proclamation stated that the country was "unstable, ungovernable, bankrupt and facing civil war", though in reality the British wished to annex it for its strategic position, using skirmishes as a casus belli. The annexation would not suspend self-government, but nonetheless attempted to convert the ZAR into a colony of the British Empire. The ZAR unanimously decided to resist the British annexation. Instead of declaring war, the country decided to send a delegation to the United Kingdom and the United States, to protest. This did not have any effect, and the First Boer War formally broke out on 20 December 1880.

It would see the introduction of the khaki uniform among British troops, marking the beginning of the end of the famous red coat. The Battle of Laing's Nek would be the last occasion on which a British Army regiment carried its official regimental colours into battle. The Pretoria Convention of 1881 was signed on 3 August 1881 and ratified on 25 October 1881 by the ZAR, where the Zuid Afrikaansche Republiek is referred to by the name "Transvaal Territory". The Pretoria Convention of 1881 was superseded in 1884 by the London Convention, in which the British suzerainty over the South African Republic was relinquished.

The British government, in the London Convention, accepted the name of the country as the South African Republic. The convention was signed in duplicate in London on 27 February 1884, by Hercules Robinson, Paul Kruger, Stephanus Jacobus du Toit and Nicolaas Smit, and later ratified by the South African Republic Volksraad. In 1885, rich gold reefs were discovered. ZAR burghers were farmers and not miners and much of the mining fell to immigrants. The immigrants were also referred to as "outlanders". By 1897, immigrants had invested over 300,000,000 British Pounds in the ZAR goldfields.

=== Malaboch War, 1894 ===
The Malaboch War was between Chief Malaboch (Mmaleboho, Mmaleboxo) of the Bahananwa (Xananwa) people and the South African Republic (ZAR) Government led by Commandant-General Piet Joubert. Malaboch refused to pay taxes to the Transvaal after it was given back to the Boers in 1881 by the British, which resulted in a military drive against him by the South African Republic (ZAR).

=== Second Boer War, 1899–1902 ===
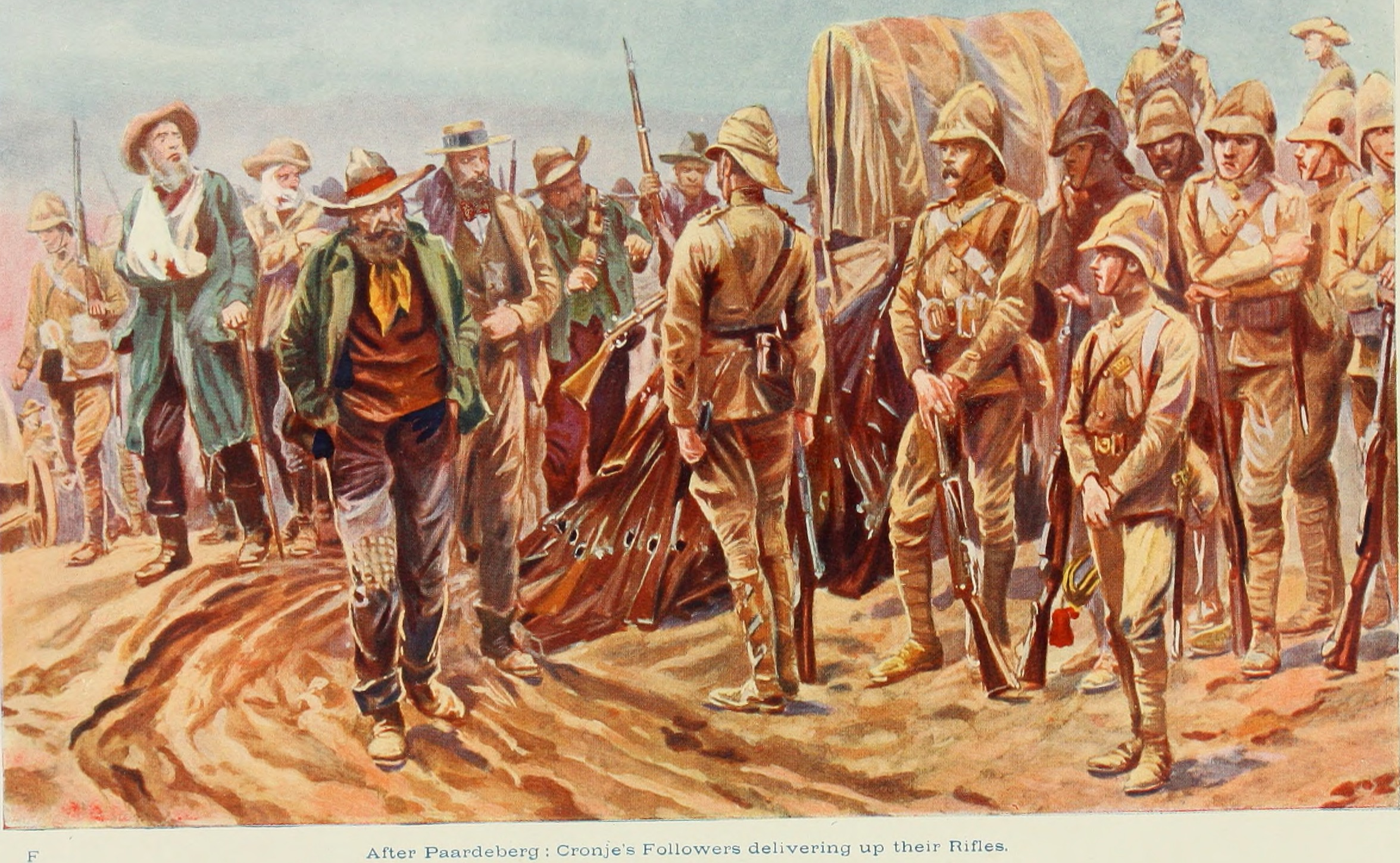
Piet Cronjé's followers delivering up their rifles

The British first attacked the ZAR with the December 1895 Jameson Raid, which ended in failure. British forces started building up troops and resources at the borders, followed by a demand for voting rights for the ZAR's 60,000 foreign nationals—of whom 50,000 were British. Kruger rejected the British demand and called for the withdrawal of British troops from the ZAR's borders. When the British refused, Kruger declared war against Britain, Britain received assistance from its possessions Australia, and Canada, as well as Natal and the Cape Colony.

The Second Boer War was a watershed for the British Army in particular and for the British Empire as a whole. The British used concentration camps where women and children were held without adequate food or medical care. The abhorrent conditions in these camps caused the death of 4,177 women and 22,074 children under 16; death rates were between 344 and 700 per 1000 per year.

The Treaty of Vereeniging was signed on 31 May 1902. The treaty ended the existence of the ZAR and the Orange Free State as independent Boer republics and placed them within the British Empire. On 20 May 1903, an Inter Colonial Council was established to manage the colonies of the British Government. The Boers were promised eventual limited self-government and this was granted in 1906 and 1907. The Union of South Africa was established in 1910.

=== Maritz Rebellion, 1914–1915 ===
The Maritz rebellion was an armed insurrection which occurred in South Africa in 1914 at the start of World War I. It was led by Boers who created a provisional government and sought to reestablish the South African Republic in the Transvaal. Many members of the South African government were themselves former Boers who had fought with the Maritz rebels against the British in the Second Boer War. The self-proclaimed rebel republic allied with Germany, with whom Britain and South Africa were at war. Boer commandos operated in and out of bordering German South West Africa. By 1915, the rebellion had failed, and the ringleaders received heavy fines and terms of imprisonment.

== Economy and transport ==
All the east–west railways were constructed by the Netherlands-South African Railway Company, while lines were built from the Cape and Natal, and one to Pietersburg was built by a private British company

The discovery of gold during the Witwatersrand Gold Rush in 1886 changed the economic fortunes of the formerly impoverished ZAR. The city of Johannesburg was founded as a gold mining town in the same year. Within 10 years it grew into the largest city in Southern Africa at about 100.000 inhabitants, surpassing Cape Town and becoming one of the fastest-growing cities ever.

The discovery of gold allowed the construction of a railway network in the ZAR. The east–west railways in the ZAR, and notably the line from Pretoria to Lourenço Marques in Portuguese East Africa, were constructed by the Netherlands-South African Railway Company. The construction of the Pretoria-Lourenço Marques line allowed the ZAR access to harbour facilities not controlled by the British Empire, a key policy of Paul Kruger who deemed it vital to the country's long-term survival.

== Flag ==
The flag of the South African Republic featured three horizontal stripes of red, white and blue (mirroring the flag of the Netherlands) with a vertical green stripe at the hoist, and was known as the Vierkleur (English: "Four colour"). While the only legislation describing the flag required that the green panel be inscribed "Eendracht maakt macht" ("Unity makes strength," the motto of the republic), this was in fact rarely seen, and instead the motto was displayed with the republic's coat of arms. The Vierkleur was later incorporated into the flag of South Africa between 1928 and 1994.

== Books and articles ==
- Waag, Ian van der (January 2005). "Boer Generalship and the Politics of Command". War in History. 12 (1): 15–43. doi:10.1191/0968344505wh306oa. S2CID 220749361.
- Yap, Melanie; Leong Man, Dianne (1996). Colour, Confusion and Concessions The History of the Chinese in South Africa. Hong Kong: Hong Kong University Press. ISBN 9789622094246.
