= Hurst Hill, Gauteng =

Hurst Hill
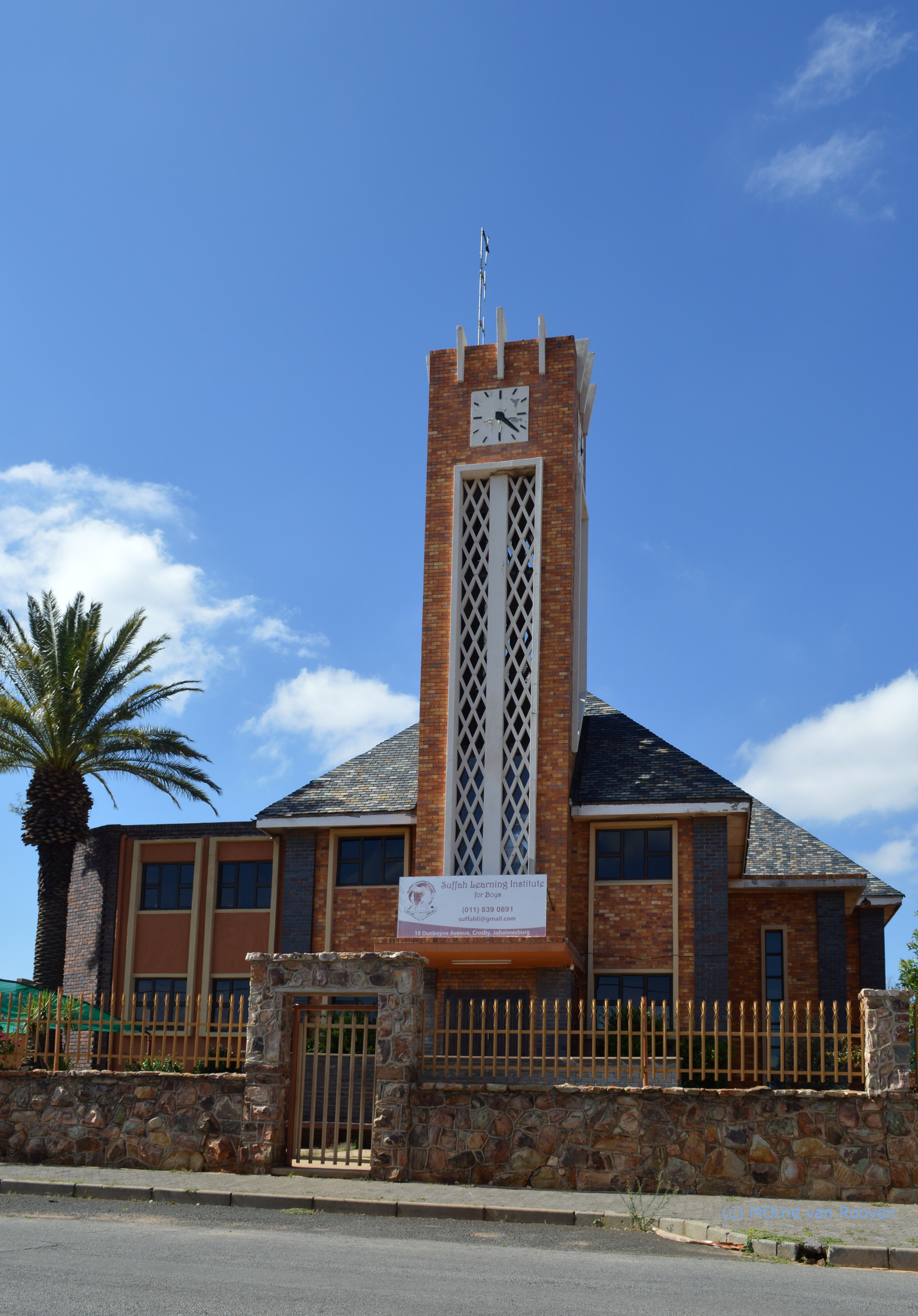
- A church in the area

- Hurst Hill's location in Gauteng
- Coordinates: 26°11′00″S 27°59′40″E
- Country: South Africa
- Province: Gauteng
- City: Johannesburg
- Established: 9 September 1925

Area
  - Total: 0.24 km^{2} (0.093 sq mi)

Population (2011)
  - Total: 2,321
  - Density: 1,327/km^{2} (3,440/sq mi)

Hurst Hill is a small area, located to the west of Johannesburg, in Region B. This small residential suburb, under Apartheid, was an Afrikaans working class area. The demographic profile of this area has changed, with its proximity to University of Johannesburg, the immediate availability of multiple transport options, including Rea Vaya transport system has led to studentification.

== History ==
Hurst Hill was laid out on the elongated farm Middelfontein between the farms Braamfontein to the north and Langlaagte to the south. To the west, Middelfontein. The result is that the area has an irregular shape, and is bordered to the northwest by Westbury, to the north by Westdene, to the northeast by Helen Joseph Hospital, to the east by Rossmore and Brixton and to the south by Crosby, where the UJ Metropolitan Academy is located.

== Hurst Hill Water reservoir ==
Water outages have affected Johannesburg residents and the Hursthill Water reservoir and the commando system is frequently in the news for water interruptions or low pressure. A multi million renovation plan will address this.
