= London Convention (1884) =

1884 treaty between the United Kingdom and Transvaal

A Convention Between Her Majesty the Queen of the United Kingdom of Great Britain and Ireland and the South African Republic
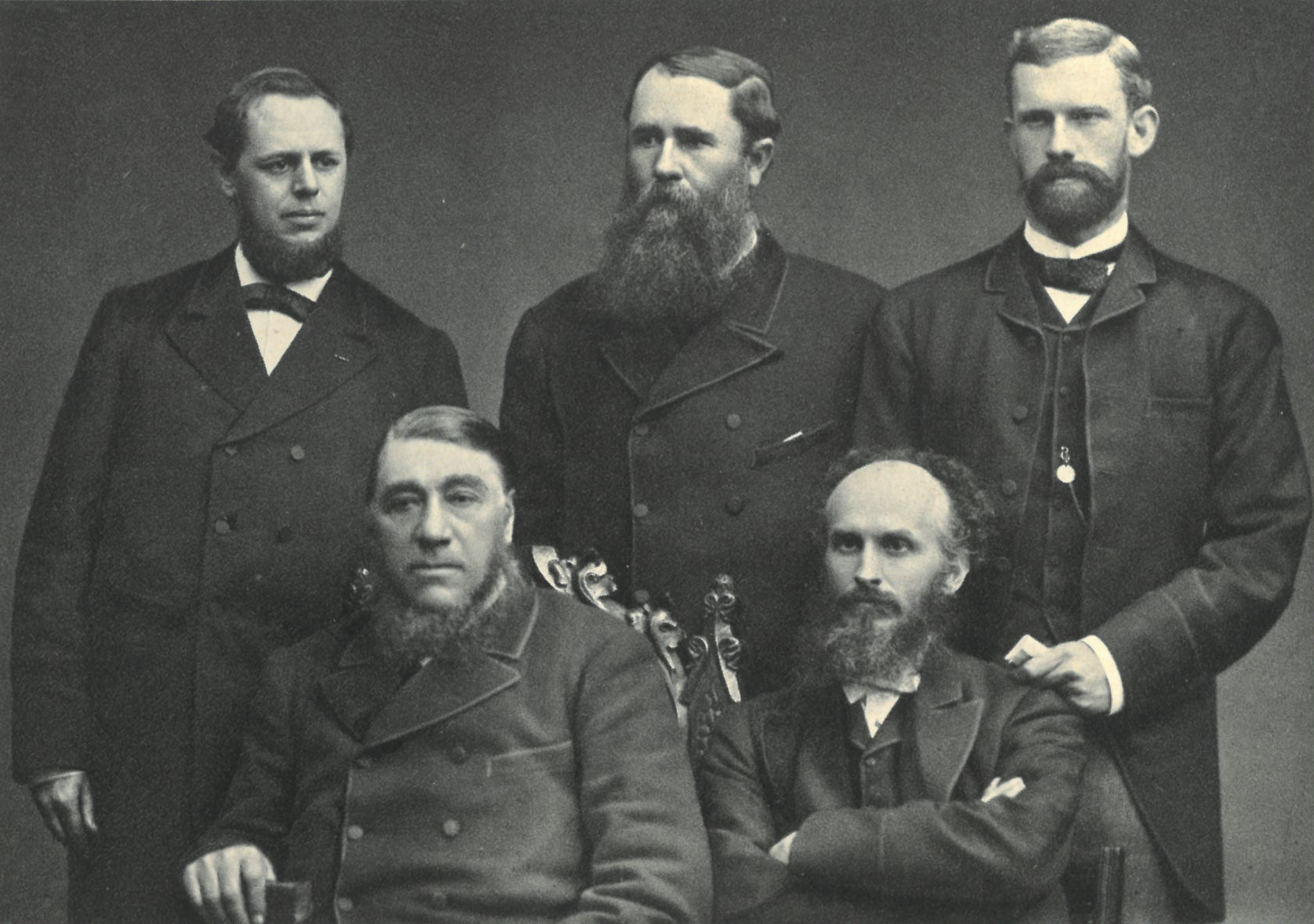
- Delegates from the South African Republic to the London Convention (1884).
- Type: Retrocession Agreement
- Context: Retrocession of the South African Republic after the First Boer War
- Signed: 27 February 1884
- Location: London
- Effective: 27 February 1884
- Condition: Ratification by four signatories
- Expiration: 31 May 1902
- Signatories: (United Kingdom of Great Britain and Ireland) H. Robinson; (South African Republic) S.J.P. Kruger; (South African Republic) S.J. du Toit; (South African Republic) N.J. Smit
- Parties: United Kingdom; Transvaal
- Language: English

Full text
- London Convention at Wikisource

The London Convention was a treaty negotiated in 1884 between Great Britain, as the paramount power in South Africa, and the South African Republic. The London Convention superseded the 1881 Pretoria Convention.

== Historical background ==
The treaty governed the relations between the ZAR and Britain following the retrocession of the South African Republic in the aftermath of the First Boer War.

== Delegates ==
The South African Republic was represented by the following delegates:

- President Paul Kruger
- General Nicolaas Smit
- Rev. Stephanus Jacobus du Toit
- Jonkheer Gerard Jacob Theodoor Beelaerts van Blokland, a Dutch legal advisor to the South African Republic
- Ewald Auguste Esselen, as secretary to the Boer delegation

== Content of the convention ==
The convention incorporated the bulk of the earlier Pretoria Convention, but with two major differences.

=== Name of the country ===
Following the Pretoria Convention, the name of the South African Republic had been changed to the Transvaal Territory. At the request of the Transvaal Territory's Volksraad the name was restored to the South African Republic.

=== Suzerainty ===
The main outcome of the London Convention was that British suzerainty over the South African Republic was amended. The London convention stipulated that the South African Republic had the right to enter into a treaty with the Orange Free State without approval from the British. Any other treaty with any other nation would require approval from the British subject to the British not taking longer than six months to advise the South African Republic of such an approval or rejection.

== See also ==
- South African Republic
- History of South Africa
