= Pretoria Convention =

1881 treaty ending the First Boer War

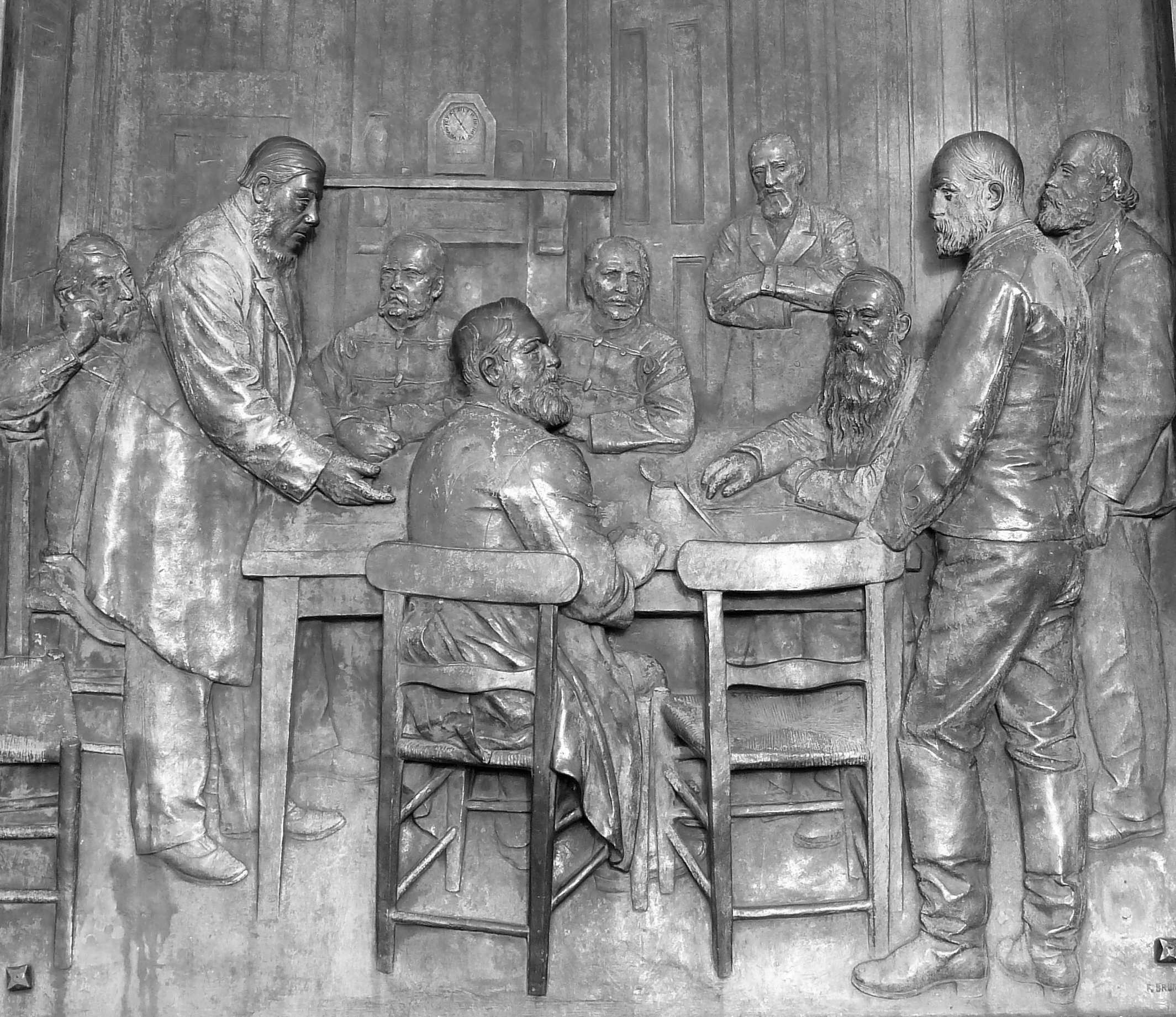
- Paul Kruger and Evelyn Wood in negotiations, relief by Anton van Wouw
- Context: End of the First Boer War and defeat of the British Empire and subsequent independence for the South African Republic
- Signed: 3 August 1881
- Location: Pretoria, South African Republic (Negotiated in Newcastle)
- Negotiators: (Orange Free State) State President Johannes Brand
- Signatories: (British Empire) Major-General Evelyn Wood High Commissioner; (British Empire) J. H. de Villiers; (South African Republic) Paul Kruger, Acting President; (South African Republic) Marthinus Wessel Pretorius; (South African Republic) Piet Joubert
- Parties: British Empire; South African Republic
- Language: English, Afrikaans

The Pretoria Convention was the peace treaty that ended the First Boer War (16 December 1880 to 23 March 1881) between the Transvaal Boers and Great Britain. The treaty was signed in Pretoria on 3 August 1881, but was subject to ratification by the Volksraad within 3 months from the date of signature. The Volksraad first raised objections to a number of the clauses of the treaty, but did eventually ratify the version signed in Pretoria, after Britain refused any further concessions or changes to the treaty.

British preparation work for the Pretoria Convention of 1881 was done at Newcastle, KwaZulu-Natal.

Under this agreement, the South African Republic regained self-government under nominal British suzerainty.

This convention was superseded in 1884 by the London Convention.

== Background ==
By the time of the Battle of Majuba, the governments of the South African Republic and Britain were in contact, President Brand of the Orange Free State acting as intermediary.

== See also ==
- Treaty of Vereeniging
