= Stephanus Jacobus du Toit =

Afrikaans clergyman, founder of the First Afrikaans Language Movement (1847–1911)

The Reverend Stephanus Jacobus
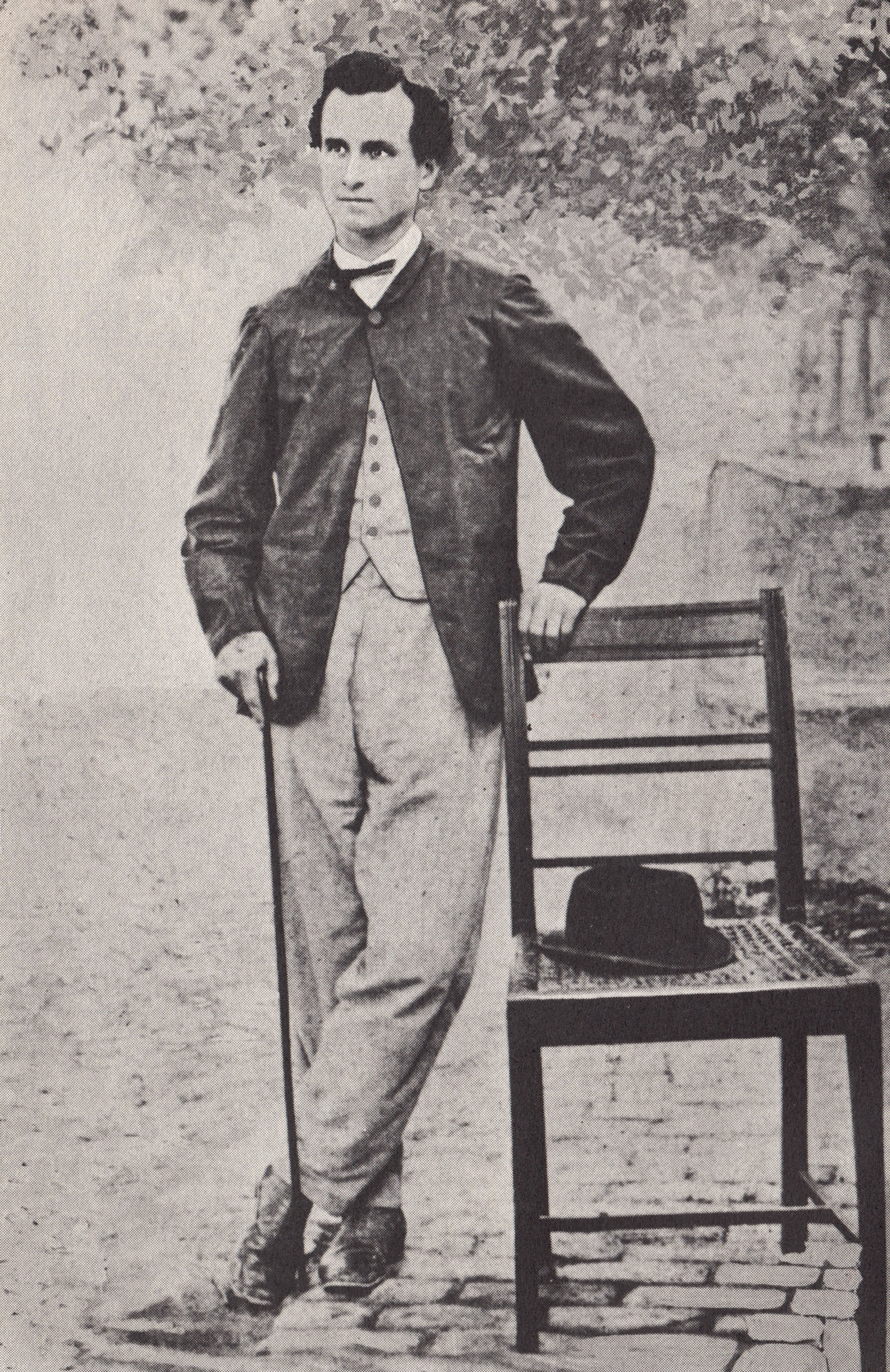
- S.J. du Toit (about 1870) when he was a theological student at Stellenbosch
- Born: 10 October 1847; Plaas Kleinbos, Daljosafat, Paarl, Cape Colony
- Died: 29 May 1911 (aged 63); Daljosafat, Paarl, Union of South Africa
- Occupations: theologian, journalist, politician
- Known for: Proponent of the Afrikaans language

Stephanus Jacobus du Toit (Afrikaans pronunciation: [stəˈfɑːnœs jaˈkuəbœs dyˈtwa]; 9 October 1847 – 29 May 1911) was a South African nationalist, theologian, journalist, and translator. He promoted the Afrikaans language as a symbol of Afrikaner nationalism, launched the first Afrikaans-language newspaper Die Afrikaanse Patriot, and translated the Bible into Afrikaans. He was Superintendent of Education in the South African Republic from 1882 to 1889.

== Early years ==
He was born in 1847 near Paarl in the Cape Colony at Plaas Kleinbos at a farm that had been in the family's possession since their arrival in the Cape as Huguenot refugees in 1688. He was educated at Paarl Gimnasium and studied theology at the Theological Seminary at Stellenbosch, completing his studies in 1872 He became an ordained minister in the Nederduitse Gereformeerde Kerk (Dutch Reformed Church, NGK) the same year. Theologically, his views were strongly influenced by Abraham Kuyper, the Dutch Neo-Calvinist thinker. This made many congregations reluctant to invite him to be their minister. In 1875, he became the minister of a new congregation based near the family farm – that of North Paarl – a post he held until 1881.

== Promoting the Afrikaans language ==
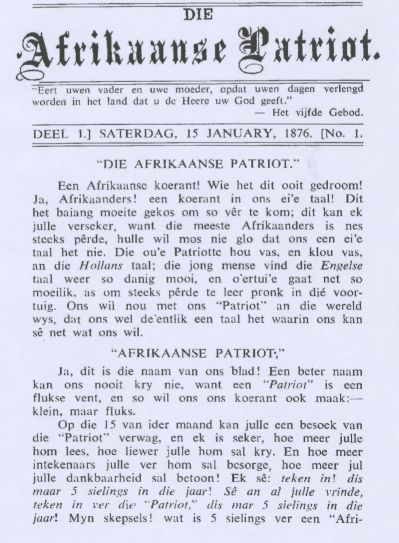
The first copy of Die Afrikaanse Patriot

At the time, better-educated Dutch settlers in the Cape Colony regarded the Afrikaans language as a patois used by the less-educated. Du Toit, however, regarded Afrikaans as a symbol of Afrikaner nationalism.

In the early 1870s, two Dutch schoolteachers, Arnoldus Pannevis and C.P. Hoogenhout, made a number of pleas in De Zuid-Afrikaan newspaper that, for the benefit of the Cape Coloured community and the lesser-educated Afrikaner community, the Bible should be translated into Afrikaans. In 1874, Pannevis addressed his concerns to the British and Foreign Bible Society, while Du Toit's articles in De Zuid-Afrikaan supported Pannevis and Hoogenhout.

On 14 August 1875, Hoogenhout, Du Toit, and others established the Genootskap van Regte Afrikaners (Society of True Afrikaners, GRA) with the objective of promoting the Afrikaans language, nation, and country. Initially, this was to be achieved by publishing a monthly journal and, as soon as possible, a dictionary and grammatical rules guideline (spraakkuns). Du Toit was elected president of the association and within a year had compiled a set of grammatical rules.

In 1876, he launched the first Afrikaans-language newspaper Die Afrikaanse Patriot. Initially a monthly publication, it had 50 subscribers; in its second year, 400; and by 1881, 3,000 subscribers, becoming a weekly publication in 1877. Although Du Toit could not openly control Die Afrikaanse Patriot without the consent of his church council, he was the driving force behind the paper, while his brother D.F. du Toit (known as Oom Lokomotief) was officially the paper's editor.

The British annexation of the Transvaal in 1877 caused considerable anger among the Dutch community throughout Southern Africa. Die Afrikaanse Patriot published a scathing attack, and Du Toit proposed a boycott of British goods and services. In October 1880, Die Patriot argued that the time had come for decisive action—many Transvaal leaders state that this was the trigger for the First Boer War, which led to the Transvaal regaining its independence in 1881.

In 1879, Du Toit proposed the formation of the Afrikaner Bond, an anti-British organisation in which all Afrikaners could feel at home. Die Patriot urged a boycott of British products. Jan Hofmeyr, who had founded the Zuidafrikaansche Boeren Beschermings Vereeniging (South African Farmers' Protection Association) as a vehicle of protest against a proposed excise duty on wine, agreed to merge the two organisations and, through skilful manoeuvring, gained control of the merged organisation.

== Later years ==
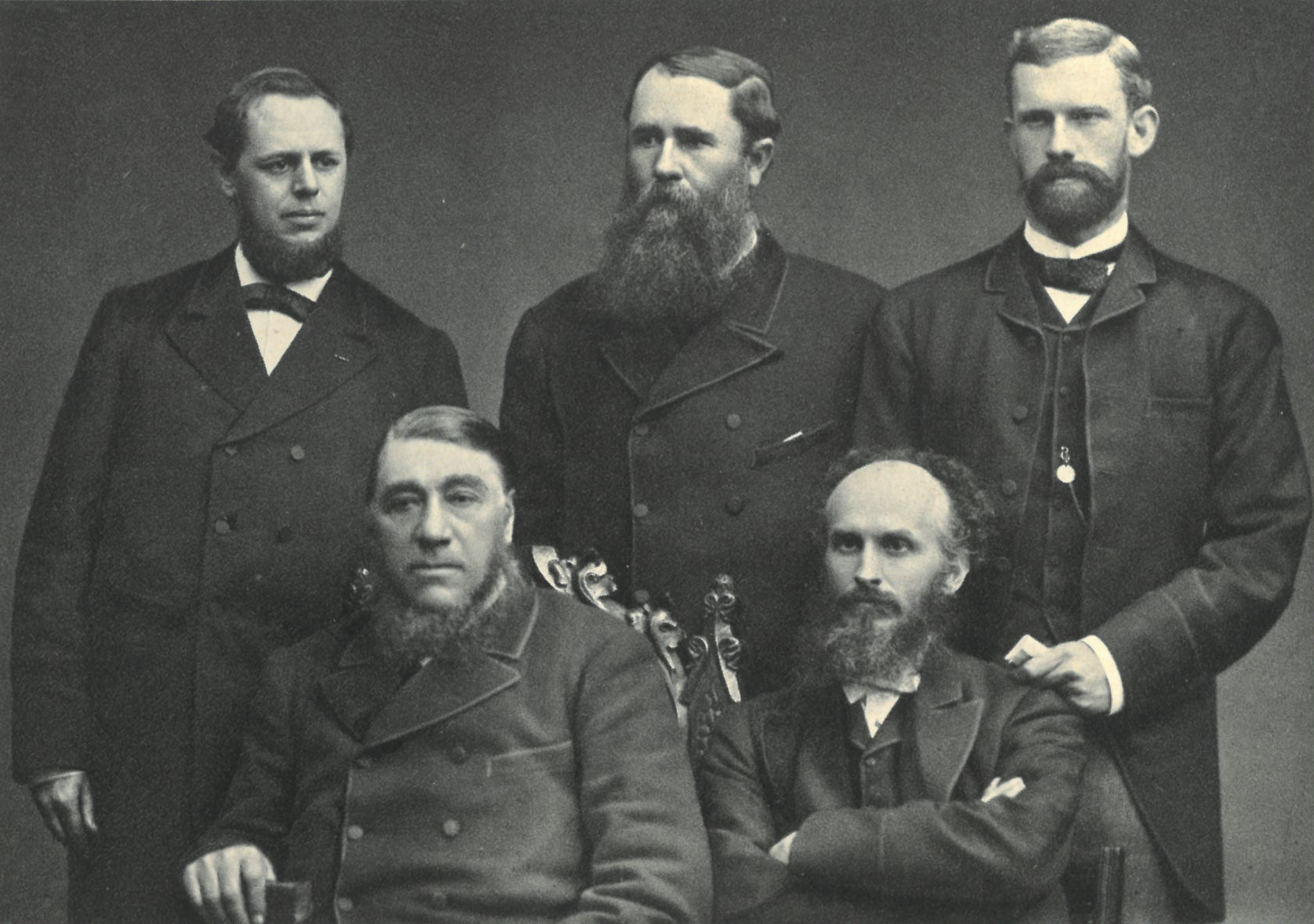
Stephanus Jacobus du Toit as one of the delegates to the London Convention in 1883–84.

In 1882, after the Transvaal (now the South African Republic) regained its independence, its president, Paul Kruger, invited Du Toit to become Superintendent of Education, a post that he held until 1889. Du Toit assisted in drafting the Republic's education law of 1882, emboding Christian national principles. While he was secretary of state, both the number of schools and the number of children attending school increased substantially. In 1883–4, he was part of Kruger's delegation to Europe and helped negotiate the London Convention. In 1875, while in the Transvaal, he was appointed official translator of the Bible by the GRA, a task for which he received official encouragement from the government of the South African Republic.

He resigned in 1888 due to a personality clash with Willem Johannes Leyds, a newly appointed advisor to Kruger. After his resignation, he returned to the Cape Colony and publicly took over the post of editor of Die Afrikaanse Patriot, breaking with his brother and other members of the Afrikaner Bond. He was personally bankrupt, having lost money in speculation while in the Transvaal. Under his editorship Die Afrikaanse Patriot adopted a much more conciliatory stance towards the British Government, possibly as a result of financial backing he received from Cecil Rhodes, though this is disputed.

He continued his translation of the Bible into Afrikaans, following the principals of translation laid down by the Synod of Dordrecht requiring the use of the original Hebrew or Greek where appropriate. He succeeded in translating the Book of Genesis, the Psalms, the Songs of Solomon, Book of Joshua, the Gospel according to Matthew, the Gospel according to Mark, the Acts of the Apostles and the Book of Revelation. Du Toit's translation program was not well received—neither the synod of the NGK in Orange Free State in 1885, nor the synod of the NGK in the South African Republic in 1886 supported Du Toit's efforts. By 1890, the Eerste Taalbeweging (first language movement) was all but dead.

His son, Jakob Daniël du Toit, known by the pen name Totius, a member of the Tweede Taalbeweging (second language movement), completed the translation in 1933 with assistance from his own son, Stephanus du Toit (1905–1982).

The Jameson Raid of 1896 caused the Afrikaner Bond to break with Rhodes. Du Toit broke with the Afrikaner Bond and through Die Afrikaanse Patriot, backed Rhodes in the Jameson Raid and in the Second Anglo-Boer War. He stood for the Cape Parliament in 1898 but failed to get elected. In 1904, following financial problems, DF du Toit & Co, the company that owned Die Afrikaanse Patriot, was sold and the paper was succeeded by the Paarl Post.

Du Toit died on 25 May 1911 as a result of injuries he sustained when the cart in which he was travelling to Calvinia to visit one of his congregations overturned in August the previous year.

== Legacy ==
Du Toit was a prolific writer – the anonymous author of the epitaph on his tombstone described him as "The father of the Afrikaans language", though this honour has also been given to Pannevis, to Hoogenhout or to all three. His contributions to Afrikaans literature included:

- 1876 – Erste Beginsels van die Afrikaanse Taal [Fundamentals of the Afrikaans language] (A joint work of which Du Toit was the main contributor).
- 1877 – (With Hoogenhout and Malherbe) Die Geskiedenis van ons Land in die Taal van ons Volk [The history of our country and the language of our people].
- 1889 – Die Bybel in Afrikaans [The Bible in Afrikaans] (A brochure with a translation of the first three chapters of the Book of Genesis).
- 1893 – Genesis (translation of the Book of Genesis)
- 1895 – Mattheus (translation of the Gospel according to St Mathew)
- 1898 – Openbaring (translation of the Book of Revelation)
- 1902 – Patriot woordeboek: Afrikaans-Engels [Patriot dictionary: Afrikaans-English]
- 1907 – Die Psalms (translation of the Psalms)

== Sources ==
- This Day in South African History
- Encyclopædia Britannica
