= Homestead Park, Gauteng =

Homestead Park
- Location within Gauteng Location within South Africa
- Coordinates: 26°12′14″S 27°59′55″E
- Country: South Africa
- Province: Gauteng
- Municipality: City of Johannesburg
- Main Place: Johannesburg

Area
  - Total: 0.55 km^{2} (0.21 sq mi)

Population (2011)
  - Total: 1,423
  - Density: 2,600/km^{2} (6,700/sq mi)

Racial makeup (2011)
  - Black African: 20.5%
  - Coloured: 2.3%
  - Indian/Asian: 67.6%
  - White: 2.3%
  - Other: 7.4%

First languages (2011)
  - English: 68.5%
  - Afrikaans: 11.1%
  - Tswana: 2.8%
  - Zulu: 2.7%
  - Other: 14.9%
- Time zone: UTC+2 (SAST)
- Postal code (street): 2092

Homestead Park is a suburb of Johannesburg, South Africa. The suburb is west of the Johannesburg CBD and is adjacent to Mayfair. It is located in Region F of the City of Johannesburg Metropolitan Municipality.

== In the news ==
Residents of the suburb are concerned about the authorities' poor management of the area. Residents of Homestead Park informal settlement have built their dwellings over a gas pipeline set 1,5 m underground. The urban poor often reside in hazard hotspots, and this situation, according to a SASOL Report, is an uncontrolled safety risk. Despite fires being lit over the pipeline, the relocation of settlements is being delayed by the city bureaucracy.
