= Johannes François Snelleman =

Dutch zoologist, orientalist, ethnographer and museum director (1852–1938)

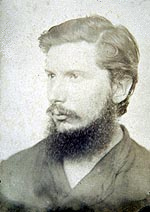
- Born: 26 December 1852; Rotterdam, The Netherlands
- Died: 18 May 1938 (aged 85); The Hague, The Netherlands
- Occupations: Orientalist, ethnographer, museum director

Johannes François Snelleman (26 December 1852 – 18 May 1938) was a Dutch zoologist, orientalist, ethnographer and museum director. He was a son of Christiaan Snelleman and Sara Lacombe. Snelleman was married three times, to Josepha Hendrika Dupont, Catharina Johanna Elisabeth Augusta Inckel, and Theodora Maria Beun.

== Expeditions and publications ==
Between 1887 and 1889 Snelleman participated as zoologist in a scientific expedition to Central Sumatra (Netherlands East Indies), with the objective to map the Hari River basin to do research into the natural environment and the people. The expedition, organised by the Royal Netherlands Geographical Society, was led by lieutenant Johannes Schouw Santvoort, Royal Dutch Navy, with members D.D. Veth (son of KNAG chairman P.J. Veth) and A.L. van Hasselt. Snelleman wrote a book about the expedition.

After the Sumatra Expedition Snelleman and Veth senior and junior kept a close contact. During a later KNAG expedition in Angola in 1884/'85, D.D. Veth died of exhaustion. Together with his father P.J. Veth, Snelleman wrote a book about D.D. Veth and the expedition in South West Africa. Later, Snelleman would cooperate in a book series published by Veth, and titled Java, geographisch, ethnologisch, historisch (Java: geography, ethnography, history).

In 1892, he co-authored Industrie des Cafres du sud-est de l'Afrique on Southeast African collections in the Netherlands with Hendrik Muller.

Snelleman was editor of the four volume Encyclopaedie van Nederlandsch-Indië (Encyclopedia the Netherlands Indies), started in 1896 with P.A. van der Lith as sole editor. Snelleman cooperated with Van der Lith on volume two (1899) and became joint editor for volume three (1902). After the death of Van der Lith in March 1901, Snelleman completed the final volume (1905) as sole editor.

Together with H.D. Benjamins, Snelleman published the Encyclopaedie van Nederlandsch West-Indië (Encyclopedia of the Dutch West Indies) With the same Benjamins, Snelleman started the journal nl:De West-Indische Gids (West Indian Guide) in 1919.

== Museum director ==
In 1901, Snelleman was appointed director of the Ethnologisch Museum (Ethnological Museum) in Rotterdam (later named Museum voor Land- en Volkenkunde and currently Wereldmuseum Rotterdam) and the Maritiem Museum 'Prins Hendrik' (Maritime Museum 'Prince Hendrik') in that city. These two, thematically unconnected museums, were placed under a single directorship in 1885. He kept this position until early 1915, when he took his retirement due to ill-health.

== Bibliography (selection) ==
- Bijdragen tot de kennis der fauna van Midden-Sumatra - deel 1, 1887 (with others)
- Daniël Veth's reizen in Angola, voorafgegaan door eene schets van zijn leven, 1887, (P.J. Veth and Joh. F. Snelleman)
- Industrie des Cafres du Sud-Est de l'Afrique. Collection recueillie sur les lieux et notice ethnographique par H.P.N. Muller, Description des objets représentés par J.F. Snelleman, 1892 (with H.P.N. Muller)
- Encyclopaedie van Nederlandsch-Indië, vol. 2 (1899) as editorial assistant, vol. 3 (1902) (joint editor with P.A. van der Lith, vol. 4 (1905) (sole editor)
- Bijdragen tot de kennis der fauna van Midden-Sumatra - vol. 2, 1892 (with others)
- Encyclopædie van Nederlandsch West-Indië, 1914-1917, editors H.D. Benjamins en Joh. F. Snelleman
- Scheepvaart-musea en Rotterdamsche toestanden, 1916
- Het Ethnologisch Museum van Rotterdam, 1917
