= Hendrik Pieter Nicolaas Muller =

Dutch entrepreneur, diplomat and publicist

Hendrik Muller
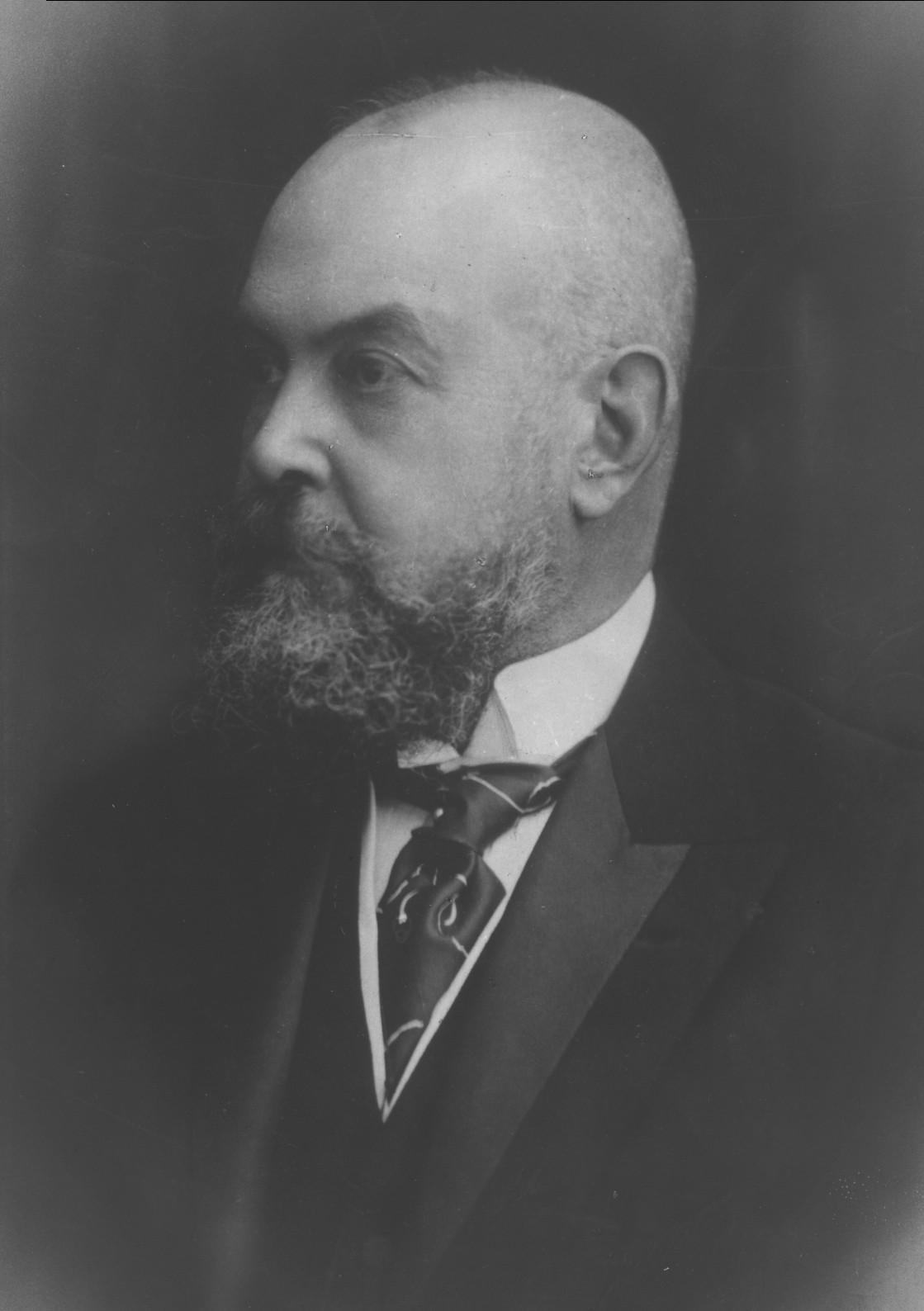
- Born: Hendrik Pieter Nicolaas Muller; 2 April 1859; Rotterdam, Netherlands
- Died: 11 August 1941 (aged 82); The Hague, Netherlands
- Occupation(s): Diplomat, publicist

Hendrik Pieter Nicolaas Muller (2 April 1859 – 11 August 1941) was a Dutch entrepreneur, diplomat and publicist. He started his career as a businessman, trading with East and West Africa. In his mid-twenties he travelled to Zanzibar, Mozambique, and South Africa for business purposes, but showed himself a keen ethnographer as well.

In 1896, he was first appointed consul and later consul general for the Orange Free State. Muller held this position all through the Second Boer War and his high-profile performance as European representative for this Boer republic won him considerable notoriety. After the Treaty of Vereeniging was signed in 1902, Muller retired to a life of travelling and writing for some years, making Muller a household name with his travel books. In 1919, the Dutch government appointed him envoy extraordinary and minister plenipotentiary to Romania, and later to Czechoslovakia.

Muller was a prolific writer. Over the course of his life he published well over two hundred articles, brochures, and books about his travels, South Africa and the Boers, and Dutch foreign policy. Muller gathered a large fortune with well appointed private investments. He bequeathed his considerable wealth to a private fund in support of academic research and cultural heritage.

== Biography ==
=== Early life as businessman ===
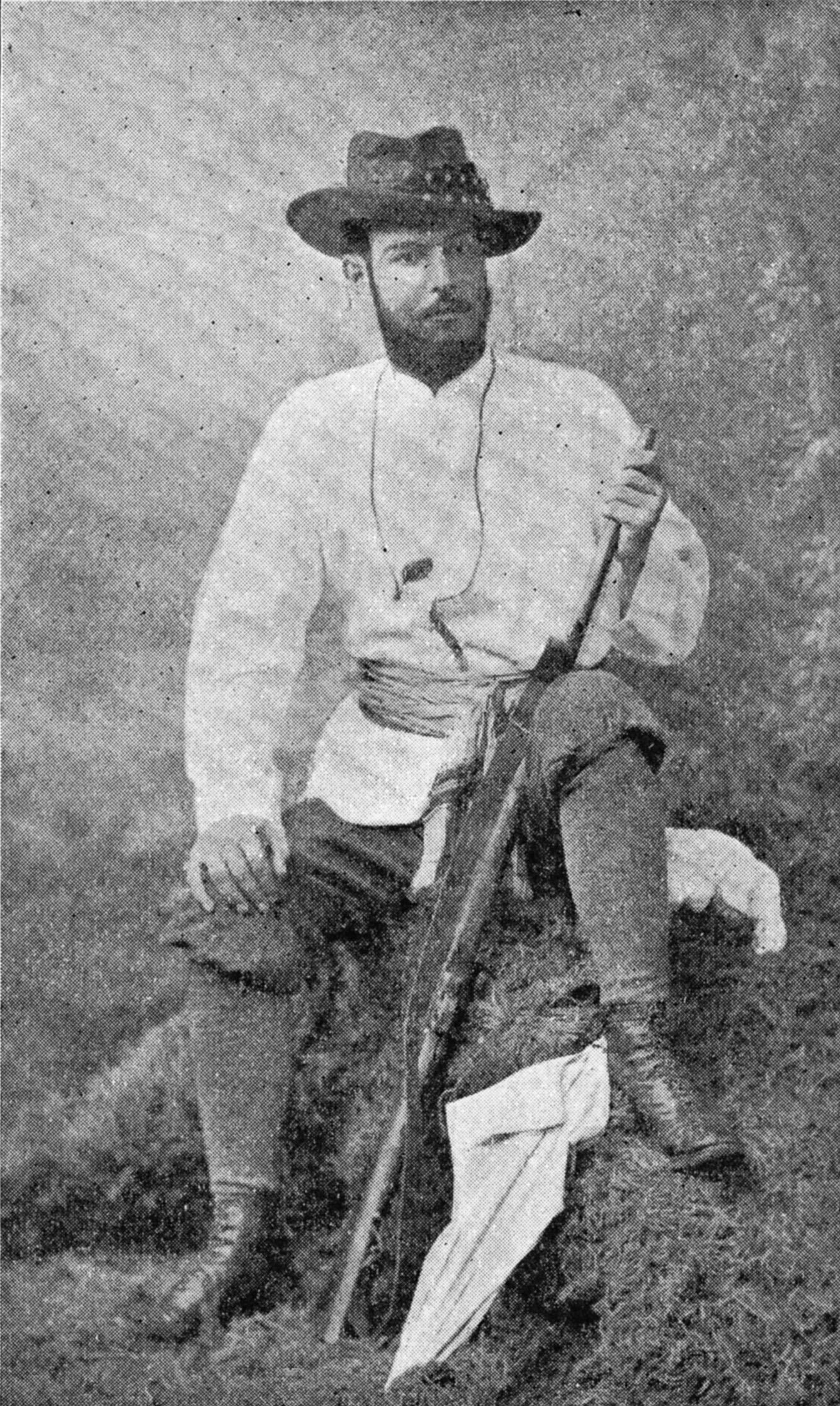
Muller in East Africa

Hendrik Pieter Nicolaas Muller was born in Rotterdam on 2 April 1859, as the third child and second son of Hendrik Muller Szn. and Marie Cornelie van Rijckevorsel. His father was a successful businessman based in Rotterdam and trading with Africa and the Netherlands East Indies. H.P.N. Muller's maternal grandfather, Abram van Rijckevorsel, was the doyen of the Rotterdam merchant community in the early part of the nineteenth century. Both his father and maternal grandfather were politicians as well, liberals who staunchly defended the principle of free trade, and both were at one time members of the Senate of the States-General of the Netherlands.

Muller's paternal grandfather was a German immigrant to the Netherlands and a Mennonite minister and professor of theology in Amsterdam. The Muller family was fairly prominent in the Netherlands in the nineteenth and early twentieth century, with Christian ministers, professors of literature and history, archivists, antiquarian booksellers, statesmen and businessmen in their midst.

Muller was destined to step into his father's footsteps and become a businessman. He first attended the private institution Delfos followed by the Hogere Burgerschool (high school) in Rotterdam, before continuing his education in Germany, at the Hohe Real Schule in Frankfurt-am-Main, to specialise in trade and business. After finishing his studies with good results, he continued his training with internships in business firms in Liverpool, Manchester, and Marseille. His first serious job came when his father called him back to Rotterdam in 1882, to become interim manager of the Handels Compagnie Mozambique (Trading Company Mozambique), an ill-performing trading firm doing business in Mozambique. In 1882, Muller travelled to East Africa and visited all the trading posts and establishments of the firm, changing business practices. At the end of his trip he made an extensive tour of South Africa, visiting Natal, Zululand, Transvaal, the Orange Free State, and the Cape Colony. On his return to Rotterdam he advised the directors of the company on business opportunities. Subsequently, he was appointed co-director of the reconstituted company, now called the Oost-Afrikaansche Compagnie (East African Company), as well as deputy manager in his father's firm, Hendrik Muller & Co., which had important trading interests in Liberia and elsewhere in West Africa.

In the 1880s Muller was active for his businesses, and travelled to the Congo Conference in Berlin in 1884, to Portugal in 1886 and North Africa in 1889. In the same year he succeeded his father as consul general for Liberia in the Netherlands, a position he would hold until 1913. After a third business journey to Africa in 1890, now to Liberia and the Gold Coast, for Hendrik Muller & Co., he returned home seriously ill, and had to convalesce for months. In this period he fell out with his father and younger brother Abram Muller, about both personal and business matters. It was a personal break that would never be healed and with professional repercussions. In 1891, Muller left business for good and embarked on a totally new career.

=== Ethnographer and geographer ===
Already in the 1880s, Muller had dabbled in ethnography and writing. On the basis of materials gathered on his journey to East Africa and South Africa in 1882/'83, he had held public lectures throughout the Netherlands and Belgium. He also published articles on his trip in Dutch magazines and newspapers, and collated these publications into a book titled Zuid-Afrika. It made him somewhat of a celebrity, and an expert on South Africa and East Africa. During his journey Muller had also collected a large number of ethnographic objects and artefacts, on which he published a richly illustrated study in 1892, together with Johannes François Snelleman, curator of the Africa collection in the National Museum of Ethnology in Leiden.

Once freed from running the better part of two businesses, and financially independent, Muller went to Germany to study geography and ethnography. He attended lectures at the universities of Heidelberg and Leipzig before completing his doctorate at the University of Giessen in 1894, summa cum laude. His thesis Land und Leute zwischen Zambezi und Limpopo (Land and People between Zambezi and Limpopo) was mainly based on secondary material, rather than the materials collected and observations made by Muller himself during his time in East Africa. This limited the originality of the study, although in its time it was appreciated as an important piece of academic work, and was also published in a commercial version.

=== Consul general for the Orange Free State ===
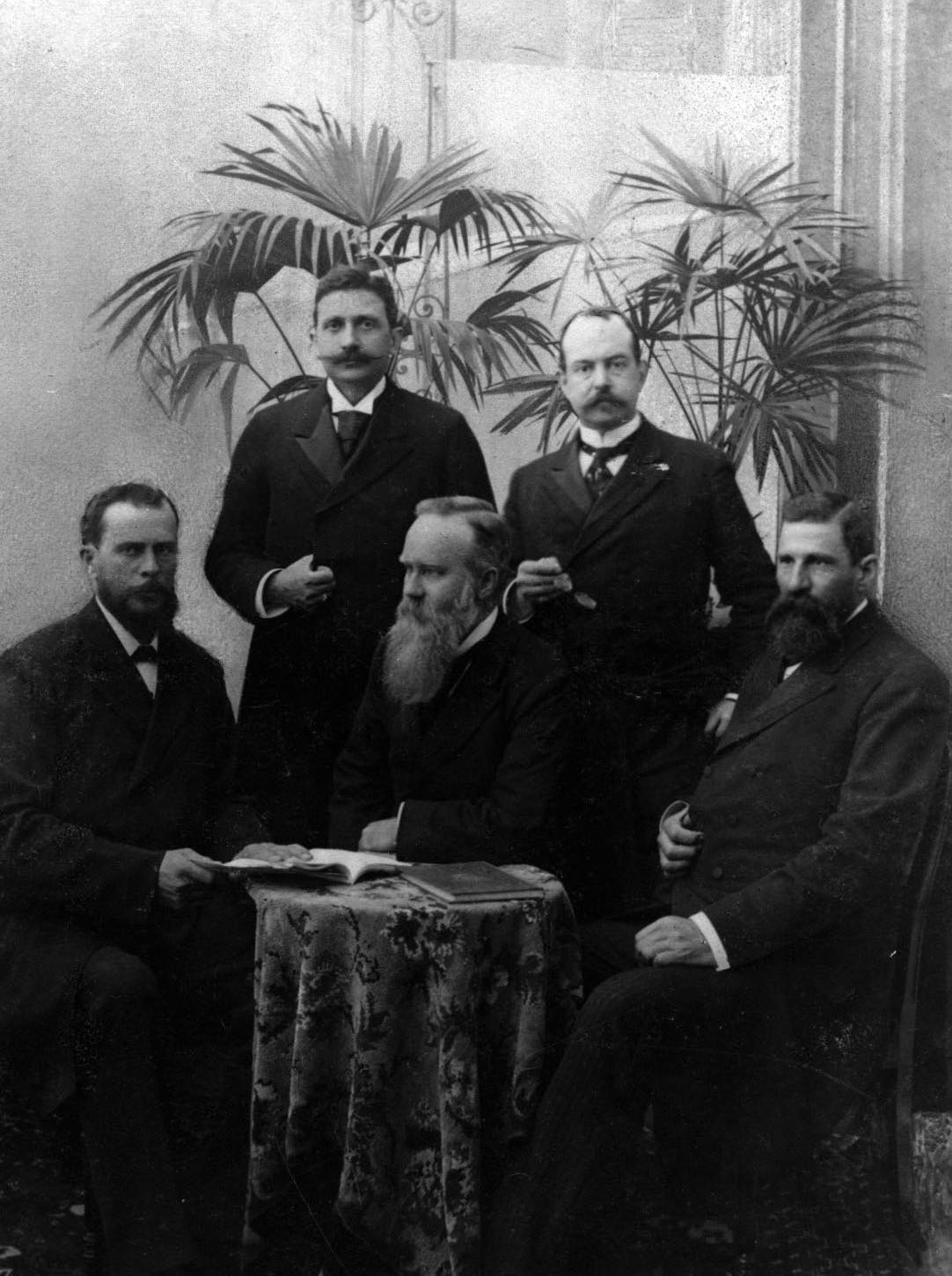
Delegation of the Boer Republics to Europe and America, 1900

After his return to the Netherlands, H.P.N. Muller settled down in The Hague, where he was originally only occupied with his consular duties for Liberia, his membership of the Commission for Consular Examinations (since 1890) and his writing. Early in 1896 Muller was appointed as consul for the Orange Free State in the provinces of North and South Holland, assisting the consul general Hendrik Antonie Lodewijk Hamelberg. He received the appointment on the strength of his publications about South Africa. After Hamelberg's death later in 1896 Muller succeeded him as consul general. It was an honorary position. In the following years Muller wholeheartedly set out to work for the Orange Free State and its interests in Europe. His predecessor Hamelberg had not only been consul general, but had on occasion also acted as special envoy to be able to negotiate treaties and accords with foreign powers. Muller also acted as special envoy and in this capacity inter alia enrolled the Orange Free State in the Universal Postal Union, the Paris Convention for the Protection of Industrial Property, and the Geneva Conventions, and negotiated treaties of friendship and trade with Germany, Switzerland, and the Netherlands. He also strengthened the consular representation of the Orange Free State in Europe and inquired into all kinds of practical issues like a cure for rinderpest and improved methods of irrigation.

In 1898 Muller travelled to South Africa, where he visited Cape Town, the Orange Free State, and the Zuid-Afrikaansche Republiek. In Pretoria he attended the inauguration of President Paul Kruger, and in Bloemfontein, he struck up a friendship with the newly elected President Marthinus Theunis Steyn and his family. He also renewed his relations with other leading statesmen, like former President Francis William Reitz, government secretary Pieter Jeremias Blignaut, and chairman of the Volksraad, Cornelius Hermanus Wessels. In Cape Town, he was granted an audience with High Commissioner Sir Alfred Milner.

Muller as consul general of the Orange Free State

Once back in the Netherlands, the political situation in South Africa became tense very rapidly, and Muller did all he could to propagate the cause of the Boer Republics in the press and via diplomatic channels. Once the South African War broke out in October 1899, Muller set up an elaborate operation to support the cause of the war for the Orange Free State. He mobilised public support in the Netherlands, Germany and the United States of America and had public gatherings organised. Through his many contacts with the European press Muller saw to it that the Boer cause was extensively covered in the newspapers, usually in his own words, but published in the name of the respective editor. His office in The Hague was the hub of diplomatic and consular activity in this period, with several secretaries working continuously on the gathering of information and dealing with correspondence. In the war effort Muller cooperated with the Algemeen Nederlandsch Verbond in Dordrecht, the Nederlandsche Zuid-Afrikaansche Vereeniging in Amsterdam, and of course the Transvaal's diplomatic representative in Brussels, Willem Johannes Leyds. Originally the relationship between Muller and Leyds was cordial, but with time it soured and turned into open animosity. Both men were strong personalities with strong convictions. The fact that Muller was only consul general and Leyds an accredited diplomat was not helpful and neither was that – at least in Muller's opinion – the Zuid-Afrikaansche Republiek received much more attention than the Orange Free State. The first time problems arose in the open was in 1900, when the Boer republics sent a joint Special Diplomatic Delegation to Europe and the United States, which was ill-prepared and for which Leyds had very different ideas than Muller.

In 1901, Muller travelled to the United States himself to mobilise support from President Theodore Roosevelt, especially on behalf of the women and children in the British concentration camps. He also held public lectures all around the country. While visiting Mexico, news reached Muller about the Peace of Vereeniging, making him jobless. Muller took the opportunity to turn his American journey into an expedition. On his return to the Netherlands in 1903 he published a book about it. In the years after the end of the South African War Muller maintained his interest in South Africa and the Afrikaners, both personally and professionally. In 1904 he supported the Steyn family when they were in Europe for the President's recovery of a debilitating illness. Until his death Muller was active for the Algemeen Nederlandsch Verbond and the Nederlandsche Zuid-Afrikaansche Vereeniging.

=== Travel through Asia ===
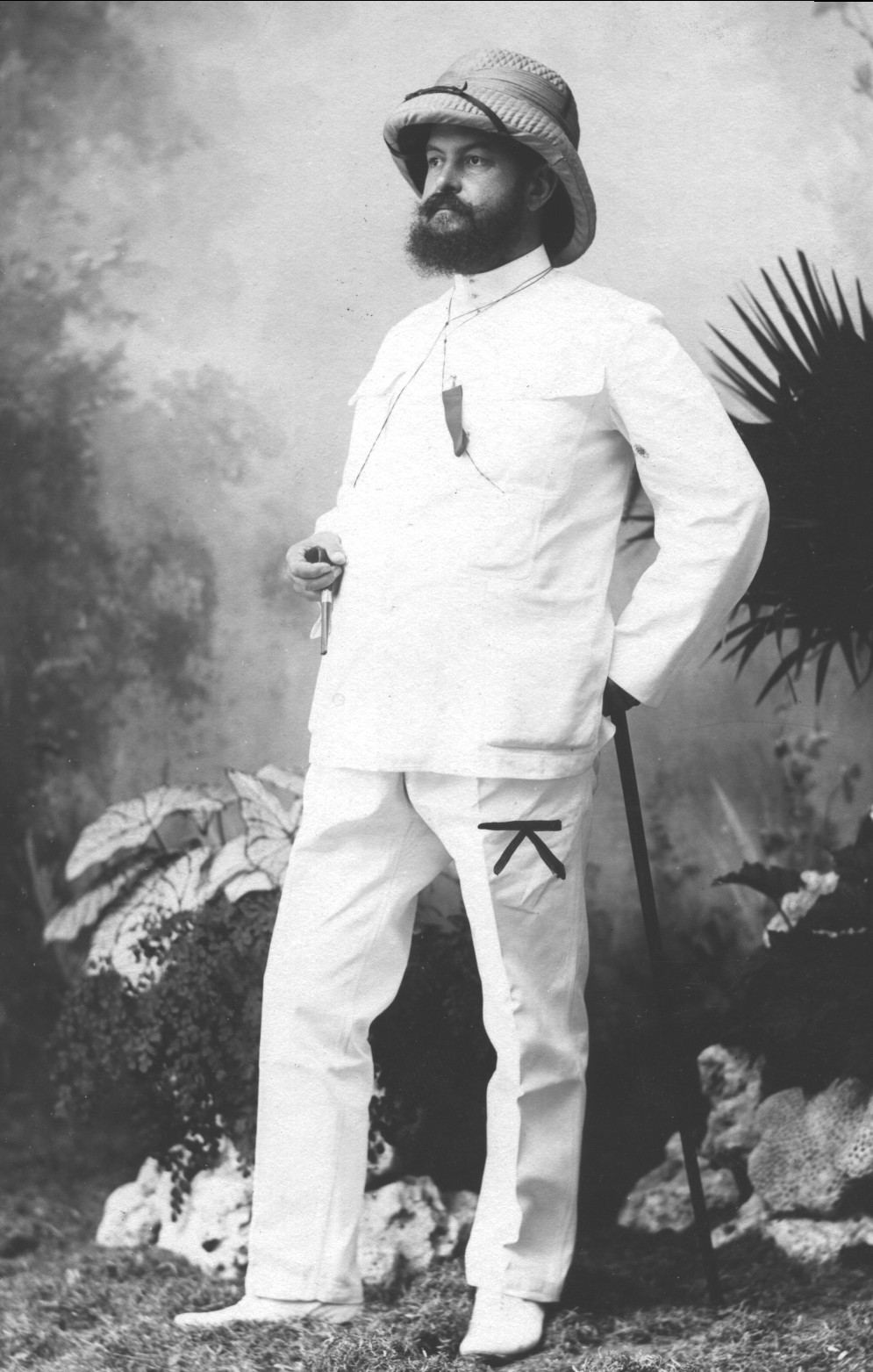
Muller in the Dutch East Indies, 1907

Between 1907 and 1909 Muller travelled through Asia, a journey that produced several books and articles after his return, including a two-part report of his travels (Azië gespiegeld; Asia mirrored). Muller also published a scientific source publication on Cambodia and the earliest Dutch presence in French Indochina. The French government rewarded him for it with a knighthood in the Legion of Honour for the latter. The French colony Annam made Muller a knight in the Order of the Dragon for his contributions to the history of Vietnam.

Muller's Asian trip was comprehensive. He visited British India and Ceylon, Burma, Malaysia and the Philippines and French Indochina, travelled extensively through the Dutch East Indies, and returned via Japan, Korea – where he had an audience with the last Korean emperor –, Manchuria, China, and Siberia. Muller's visit to Japan triggered a lively interest in this country and its economic development potential. Back in the Netherlands he presented his views on the country in several speeches, brochures, and articles, mainly under the auspices of the Comité Nederland–Japan (Dutch–Japanese Committee).

=== Dutch government official and diplomat ===
In 1914, at the outbreak of World War I, Muller's career took a new turn. The Dutch government appointed him government commissioner in charge of one of the main Belgian Refugee Camps in the Netherlands. Muller was charged with the transfer of the camp from a makeshift army encampment in Oldebroek to a proper refugee camp with full provisions in Nunspeet. He took to the job with great enthusiasm, but resigned a year later, declaring that he had attained the goals he had set himself on his appointment. Actually the resignation came in a cloud of controversy around his person and policies. At the end of World War I the Dutch prime minister did acknowledge the high quality of Muller's work in setting up the camps and bringing and maintaining order and human dignity under very trying circumstances. Apart from his position as member of the Consular Examinations Commission, this position was the only Dutch government appointment Muller held inside the Netherlands.

From the 1890s onwards, Muller had published with great regularity about the importance of a proper Dutch consular service to promote the Dutch mercantile interests around the world. In his articles he forcefully advanced the idea that the consular and diplomatic services should be merged and professionalised. In his publications Muller also strongly propagated a more active role of the Netherlands in international affairs. In this vein, in 1919, he published an article on the history and geography of Spitsbergen and the necessity for the Dutch government to defend its historic claims on the islands. A year later, the Dutch government became a signatory to the Spitsbergen Treaty.

In 1919, now already sixty years old, he got the chance to put his opinions on Dutch foreign policy into practice. In that year the Dutch government appointed him Envoy Extraordinary and Minister Plenipotentiary to Romania, a country in the throes of political and economic transformation. The Dutch had had important business interests in the country, especially in petroleum. Muller stayed here until early 1924 when he was appointed envoy to Czechoslovakia. In Prague he was also involved in Dutch business affairs, inter alia looking after the interests of the Dutch electrotechnical firm Philips.

He resigned his post in 1932 after being requested to step back by the Dutch minister of Foreign Affairs, who wished to free some senior diplomatic posts for younger diplomats waiting to be appointed envoy. Muller decided not take his pension, allowing him to keep his title of Envoy Extraordinary and Minister Plenipotentiary until his death.

=== Dutch history and heritage ===
From an early age Muller was interested in Dutch history, especially in the great national achievements of the Dutch during the centuries. During his lifetime Muller translated his interests in several concrete projects.

In line with his historical interests he initiated the erection of a statue for the murdered Grand Pensionary of Holland, Johan de Witt (1625–1672). The statue was designed and made by the Dutch sculptor Frederik Engel Jeltsema. The unveiling in The Hague on 12 June 1918 was a national event. The actual unveiling was done by Wilhelmina of the Netherlands, with several ministers in attendance. The statue stands close to the place where De Witt and his brother Cornelis were killed by a mob in 1672. On the side of the socle a text is engraved which – in translation – reads: 'Leader and servant of the Republic, designer of it most powerful fleets, defender of the freedom of the seas, caretaker of the State's coffers, mathematician. He was a perfect Dutchman.' Muller had an important hand in the formulation of the text.

Muller funded the erection of a plaque in honour of the Dutch 17th-century Admiral Maarten Harpertsz. Tromp in the newly built City Hall of his birthplace Rotterdam.

=== Retirement ===
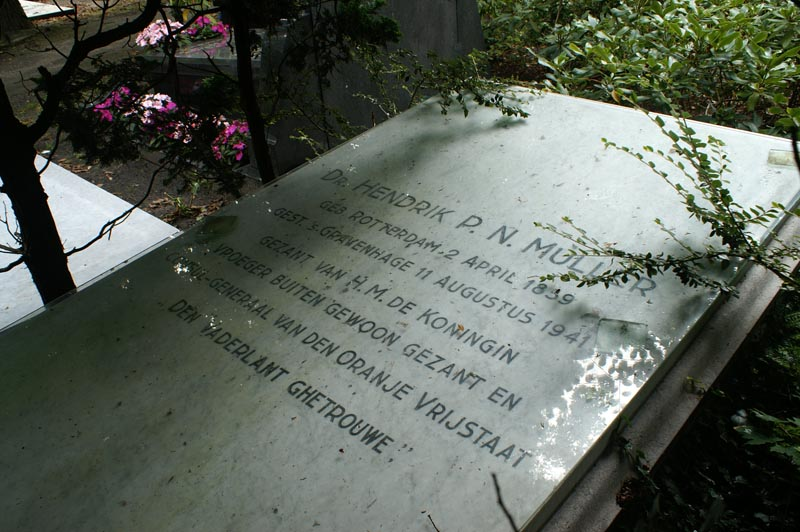
Tombstone at Oud Eik en Duinen

In the years after 1932 Muller travelled a little around Europe and retired to his house in The Hague. He remained involved in cultural and academic activities, organised his papers, and kept a keen interest in South African affairs. In the last years of his life he was honoured in several ways, among others with an honorary doctorate in law from the University of South Africa, a bust in the hall of the Eeufeesgebou of the University of the Free State, with a copy in the Rijksmuseum voor Volkenkunde (National Museum of Ethnology) in Leiden, and an honorary diner party by the Royal Geographical Society in London. Without children and never fully reconciled with his family, Muller left almost his complete estate to the Hendrik Muller's Vaderlandsch Fonds for the support of academic research and cultural heritage. Finally his health failed more and more and H.P.N. Muller died in his house in The Hague on 11 August 1941. He was buried in the cemetery of Oud Eik en Duinen in The Hague in a grand ceremony, with the Dutch flag covering the coffin and the national anthem being played, in defiance of the German Nazi occupation and as a – somewhat old-fashioned – celebration of Dutch cultural identity. Among the attendants were several former government ministers and high-ranking military officers, university professors, former diplomats, representatives of cultural and scientific organisations, and friends from his South African period and after.

During his lifetime H.P.N. Muller was well respected for his work. He was extensively decorated by almost all the countries he worked for or in, in many cases with the highest distinction. He was made a Knight Grand Cross in military and civilian orders of Portugal, Liberia, Romania, Bulgaria, Serbia, Czechoslovakia and the Netherlands, was commander of the French Legion of Honour, and knight in orders of Liberia, Annam and the Netherlands. Apart from having his bust placed in the University of the Free State, the Bloemfontein municipal authorities named a street after him.

Although highly decorated, honoured and well respected for his work, Muller was not an easy person. This shows through in a consistently bad press he received during his lifetime and after, which highlights his eccentricities and his at times volatile character.

== Memberships ==
- Fellow of the Royal Geographical Society of Great Britain
- Member and honorary member of the Royal Netherlands Geographical Society
- Member and Director of the Hollandsche Akademie van Wetenschappen
- Member of the Netherlands Literary Society
- Member and board member of the Netherlands–South African Society
- Honorary member of the Dutch Society for the Propagation of Community Singing
- Member of the Nieuwe of Littéraire Sociëteit De Witte

== Honours ==
Domestic
Grand Cross in the Order of Orange-Nassau of the Netherlands (1935)
Knight in the Order of the Netherlands Lion
Liberia 1897
Grand Commander (Grand Cross) of the Humane Order of African Redemption
Japan
Grand Cordon of the Order of the Rising Sun of Japan
Bulgaria 1921
Grand Cross of the Order of Civil Merit of Bulgaria
Romania 1922
Grand Cross of the Order of the Crown of Romania
Romania 1922
Grand Cross of the Order of the Star of Romania
Yugoslavia 1922
Grand Cross of the Order of St Sava of Yugoslavia
Czechoslovakia 1932
Grand Cross of the Order of the White Lion of Czechoslovakia
Liberia 1890
Knight Commander of the Humane Order of African Redemption of Liberia
France 1929
Commander of the Legion of Honour of France
Russia
Knight 1st class of the Order of St Anna of Russia
Vietnam
Knight 3rd class of the Order of the Dragon of Annam
Belgium
Knight of the Order of Léopold of Belgium
Portugal
Knight of the Order of Christ of Portugal

== Legacy ==
The Dr Hendrik Muller Prize for Behavioural and Social Sciences was named after Hendrik Muller. The prize is awarded every other year by the Royal Netherlands Academy of Arts and Sciences to a researcher who has made a valuable contribution to the behavioural and social sciences.

== Concise bibliography ==
During his life, H.P.N. Muller published well over 200 books, articles, columns, and papers. Many of these – especially his newspaper articles – were published anonymously. Many of the (propaganda) articles he wrote about the South African War when he was consul general for the Orange Free State were published secretly, often under another journalist's or newspaper editor's name, to maximise the public relations effect.

- Muller, Hendrik P.N., Zuid-Afrika. Reisherinneringen van Hendrik P.N. Muller. De Delagoa-Baai. – Natal. – De Transvaal. – De Diamantvelden. – De Oranje-Vrijstaat. – De Kaapkolonie (Leiden: A.W. Sijthoff, 1890).
- Muller, Hendrik P.N. & Joh. F. Snelleman, Industrie des Cafres du sud-est de l’Afrique: collection recueillie sur les lieux et notice ethnographique (Leiden: Brill z.j. [1892]). With addition: Chansons du Zambèse.
- Muller, Hendrik Pieter Nicolaas, Land und Volk zwischen Zambesi und Limpopo: Abschnitte. Dissertation Giessen (Giessen: Emil Roth 1894).
- Muller, Hendrik P.N., Land und Leute zwischen Zambesi und Limpopo (Giessen: Roth z.j. [1894]). Commercial edition of the dissertation.
- Muller, H.P.N., De Zuid-Afrikaansche Republiek en Rhodesia (Den Haag: Van Stockum 1896).
- Muller, Hendr. P.N., Oom Paul (president Kruger). Mannen en vrouwen van beteekenis in onze dagen; [serie 27], afl. 6 (Haarlem: Tjeenk Willink 1896).
- Muller, Dr. Hendrik P.N., Door het land van Columbus: een reisverhaal (Haarlem: De Erven F. Bohn 1905).
- Muller, Dr. Hendrik P.N., Oude tijden in den Oranje-Vrijstaat. Naar Mr. H.A.L. Hamelberg’s nagelaten papieren beschreven (Leiden: E.J. Brill 1907).
- Muller, Hendrik P.N., Azië gespiegeld: reisverhaal en studiën. Deel I: De Philippijnen, Siam, Fransch Indo-China, Korea, Mantsjoerije, de Siberische weg: reisverhaal en studiën (Utrecht: Honig 1912).
- Muller, H.P.N., 'Did Holland sell the Cape?’, Tijdschrift van het Koninklijk Nederlands Aardrijkskundig Genootschap 2e serie, deel 33 (1916), afl. 5, 661–664.
- Muller, Hendrik, 'Onze vaderen in China', De Gids 81 (1917).
- Muller, Hendrik P.N., Azië gespiegeld: reisverhaal en studiën. Deel II: Malakka en China: studiën en ervaringen (Leiden: Sijthoff 1918).
- Muller, Hendrik P.N., Zij en Wij. Met 'beginselverklaring en perscirculaire der Japansche Commissie' en met een voorwoord door J.H. Abendanon. Uitgaven van de Japansche Commissie der Vereeniging tot Verbreiding van Kennis over Nederland in den Vreemde (Amsterdam: E. van der Vecht, 1918).
- Muller, Hendrik, 'Nederland's historische rechten op Spitsbergen', Tijdschrift van het Koninklijk Nederlandsch Aardrijkskundig Genootschap 2e serie, deel 34 (1919) no. 1, 94–104.
