= Jenny Visser-Hooft =

Dutch traveler, mountaineer, and writer

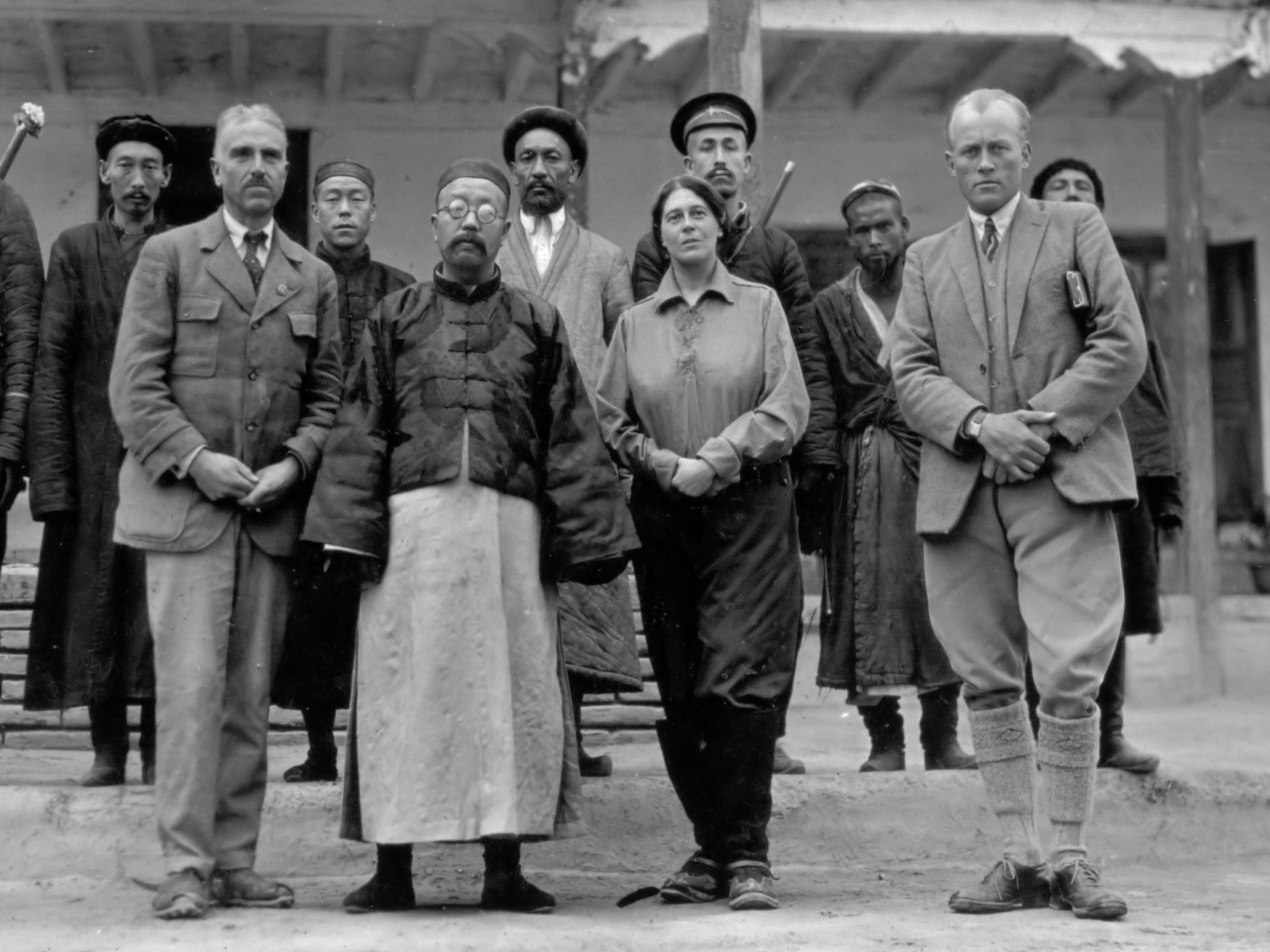
- Philips Visser, the Ambaan, Jenny Hooft and Jérôme Sillem
- Born: 18 June 1888; Kensington
- Died: 16 September 1939 (aged 51); Ankara
- Occupations: Traveler, Mountaineer, Writer, Photographer
- Known for: Flora and fauna research in Pakistan and India
- Spouse: Philips Christiaan Visser

Jenny Visser-Hooft (née Jkvr Jeannette Hooft 18 June 1888, Kensington - 16 September 1939, Ankara) was a Dutch traveler, mountaineer, and writer known for the flora and fauna research she did in the 1920s with her husband, Philips Christiaan Visser, in Pakistan and India's Karakorum Glaciers region.

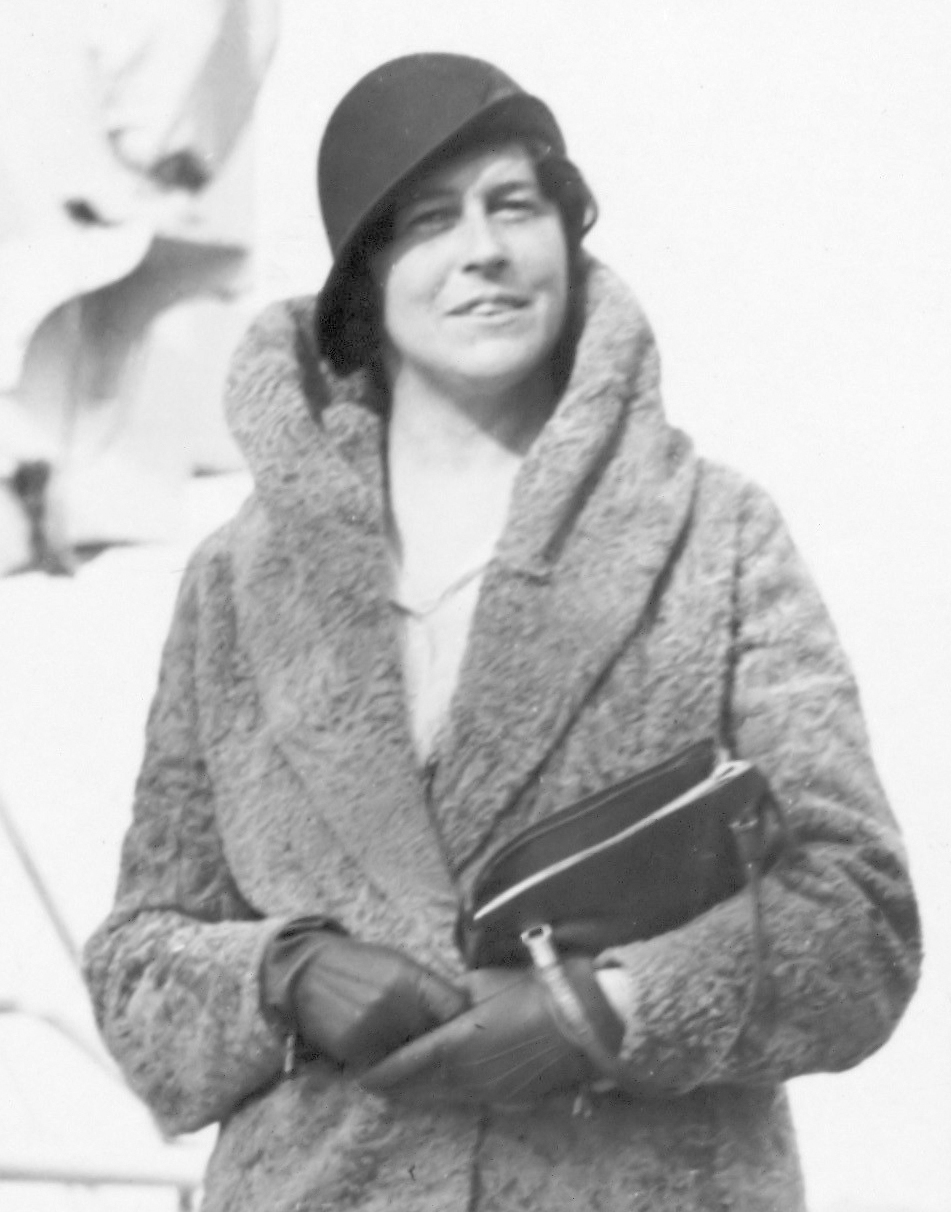
Jenny Visser-Hooft in 1926

Visser-Hooft was the daughter of Jhr Maurits Wijnand Hendrik Hooft and Jeannette Henriëtte Grader van der Maas, and was a descendant of P.C. Hooft. She married the geographer and diplomat Philips Visser (1882-1955) in 1912 in The Hague. She was a member of the Royal Netherlands Geographical Society, and of the Dutch Alpine Club, as well as serving as Vice-President of the Ladies' Alpine Club. Her archives and bust, sculpted by Fransje Carbasius, are held by the Royal Tropical Institute, while her expeditionary negatives and photographs are located at the Tropenmuseum.

== Selected works ==
- Among the Kara-Korum Glaciers in 1925 (1926)

== Sources ==
- Netzley, Patricia D. (1 January 2001). The Encyclopedia of Women's Travel and Exploration. Oryx Press. ISBN 978-1-57356-238-6.
- Visser, Jeannette Hooft; Visser, Philips Christiaan (1926). Among the Kara-Korum Glaciers in 1925. E. Arnold & Company.
- Wieringa, Saskia (2008). Traveling Heritages: New Perspectives on Collecting, Preserving, and Sharing Women's History. Amsterdam University Press. ISBN 978-90-5260-299-8.
