= Sfat Emet =

Sfat Emet or Sfath Emeth may refer to:

== Torah literature authorships ==
- Rabbi Yehudah Aryeh Leib Alter (1847–1905), author of Sfat Emet commentary on the Chumash
- Rabbi Bension Kohen, author of Sfat Emet Dikduk commentary on Lashon ha-Kodesh pronunciation
- Rabbi Moshe Hagiz (1671–1738), author of Sfat Emet (Amsterdam 1707)
