= Daniël David Veth =

Dutch explorer and photographer

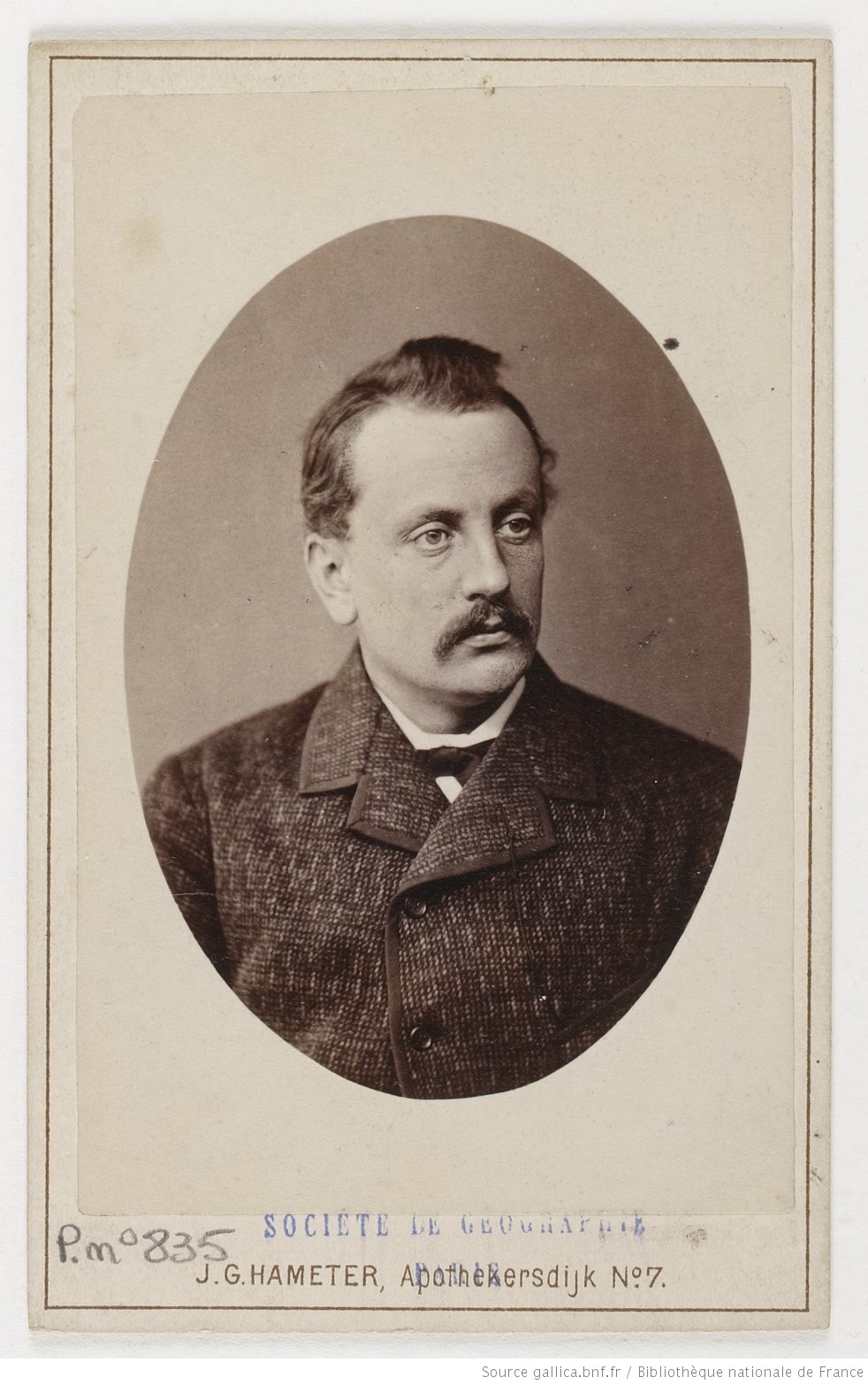
- D.D. Veth, 1883 (photo by J.G. Hameter)
- Born: 17 February 1850; Amsterdam, Netherlands
- Died: 19 May 1885 (aged 35); Angola
- Occupations: Explorer photographer

Daniël David Veth (17 February 1850 – 19 May 1885) was a Dutch explorer and photographer.

Veth was the son of Royal Netherlands Geographical Society chairman Pieter Johannes Veth, and studied engineering at technical colleges in Hanover and Stuttgart. The geographical society organized an expedition from to Central Sumatra in 1877, with the objective to map the Hari river basin, led by Johannes Schouw Santvoort of the Royal Netherlands Navy, and joined by zoologist Johannes François Snelleman and ethnographer Arend Ludolf van Hasselt. Veth was responsible for photographs and mapping. Snelleman wrote a book about the expedition.

In the fall of 1884, Veth led the Dutch Cunene River expedition in the Portuguese colonies of southwest Africa, and died a year thereafter, on the shores of the Coporolo River. He was buried in Dordrecht.

== Photographs by Veth (Sumatra, 1870s) ==
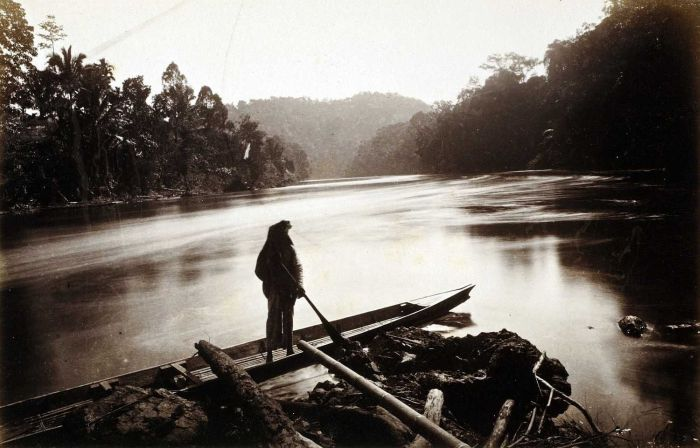
Gatang Hari river (Sumatra 1870s)

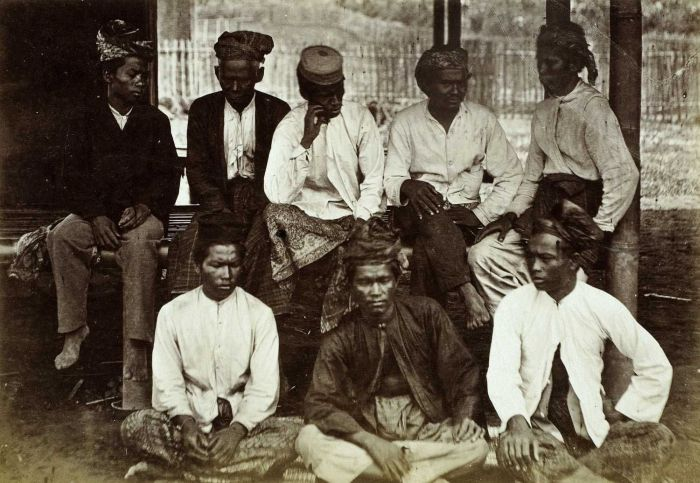
Carriers (Sumatra expedition 1870s)

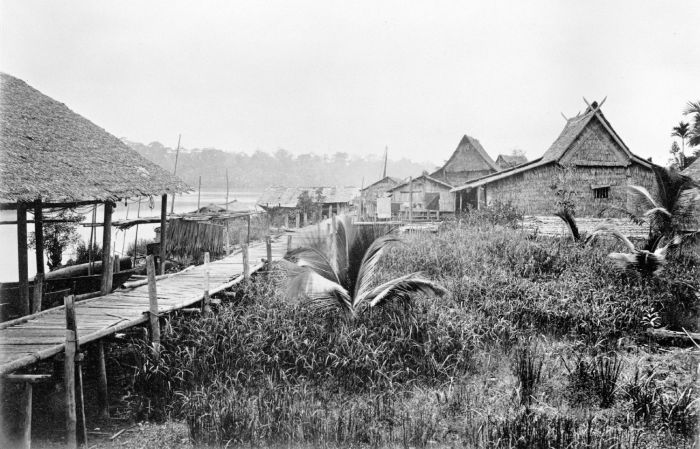
Kampong Saba (Sumatra)

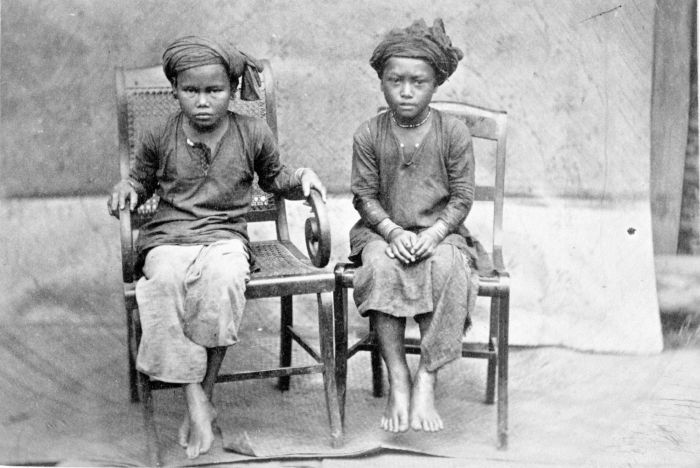
Two girls (Moeara Menkoelem)
