= Veth =

Veth is a surname.

== Notable people ==
Notable people with this surname include:

- Bastiaan Veth (1891-1947), Dutch rower
- Dana Veth (born 1987), Bahamian footballer
- Daniël David Veth (1850-1885), Dutch explorer
- Jan Damesz de Veth (1595-1625), Dutch painter
- Jan Veth (1864-1925), Dutch painter
- Pieter Johannes Veth (1814-1895), Dutch geographer

== As given name ==
- Veth Rattana (born 1986), Cambodian actress

== Fictional characters ==
- Veth Brenatto, one of the main characters from the Dungeons & Dragons web series Critical Role

== See also ==
- Veth (India), custom of servitude imposed upon peasants in India.
