= Tijdschrift voor economische en sociale geografie =

- Discipline: Geography and Economics
- Language: English
- Edited by: Ilse van Liempt; Michiel van Meeteren

Publication details
- History: 1910-present
- Publisher: Wiley-Blackwell on behalf of the Royal Dutch Geographical Society.
- Frequency: 5/year
- Impact factor: 1.8 (2024)

Standard abbreviations
- ISO 4: Tijdschr. Econ. Soc. Geogr.

Indexing
- ISSN: 0040-747X (print); 1467-9663 (web)
- LCCN: 39030492
- OCLC no.: 754640298

Links
- Journal homepage; Online access; Online archive

The Tijdschrift voor economische en sociale geografie (English: Journal of Economic & Human Geography) is a peer-reviewed academic journal published by Wiley-Blackwell on behalf of the Royal Dutch Geographical Society. The editors-in-chief are Ilse van Liempt (Utrecht University) and Michiel van Meeteren (Utrecht University). The journal focuses on contemporary issues in human geography, with articles relating to economic, social, cultural and political geographical themes. It journal was established in 1910, making it the oldest journal in human geography.

According to the Journal Citation Reports, the journal has a 2024 impact factor of 1.8.
