= Philips Christiaan Visser =

Dutch writer (1882–1955)

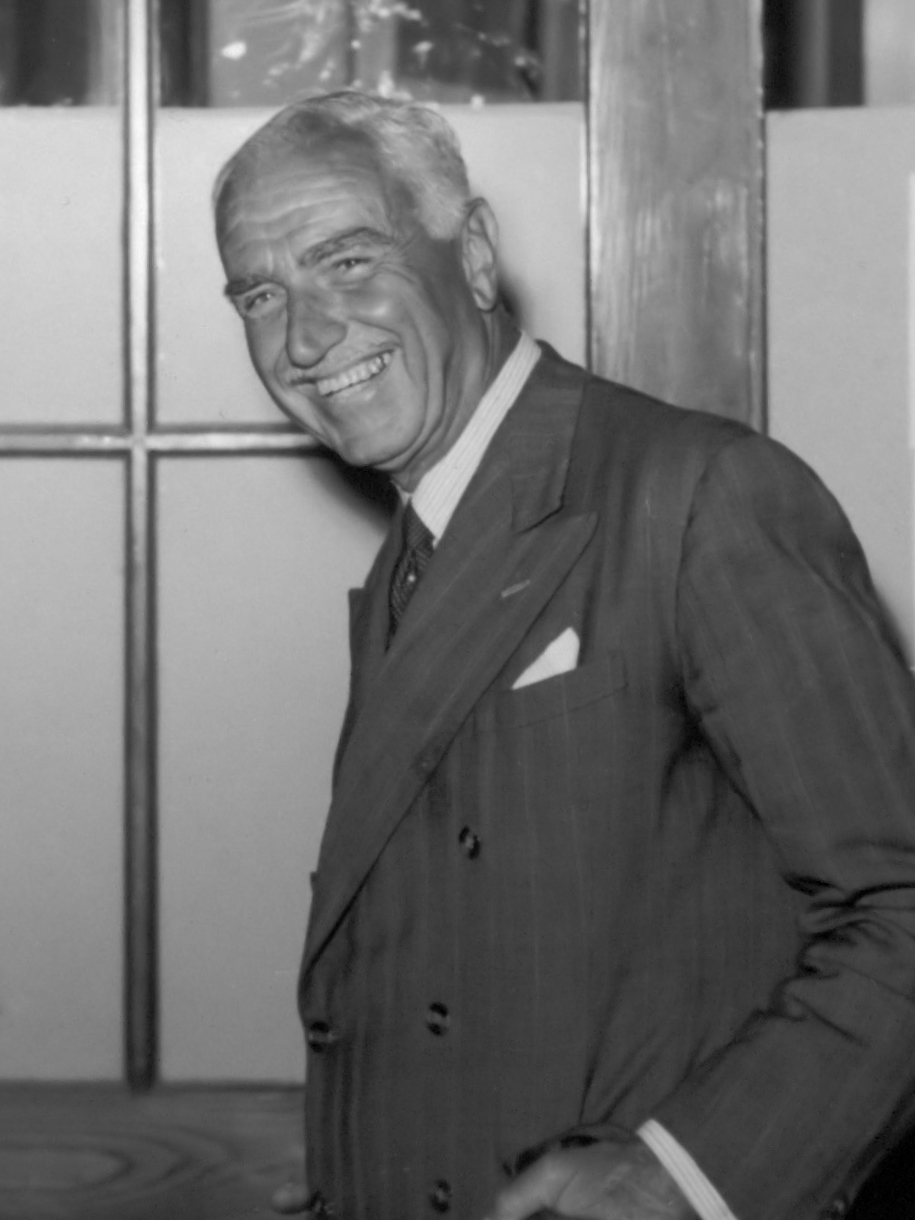
- Visser in 1945
- Born: May 8, 1882; Schiedam, Netherlands
- Died: May 3, 1955 (aged 72); Wassenaar, Netherlands
- Occupations: Geographer, Explorer, Diplomat and Glaciologist
- Years active: 1917–1949
- Known for: Multiple Expeditions mapping and gathering population and glacier movements in British India
- Spouse(s): Jenny Visser-Hooft (m. 1912 – her death 1939); Cornelie Alexine de Graeff (m. 1941–55)
- Children: 3

Philips Christiaan Visser (May 8, 1882 – May 3, 1955) was a Dutch geographer, explorer, mountaineer, diplomat and glaciologist. Visser was mostly known for his travel reports and lectures about his expeditions to the Karakoram Mountains in the far north of then British India.

== Biography ==
Visser was born on May 8, 1882 in Schiedam, where his father was the owner of a small restaurant. After completing the HBS, he followed a trade education and became a partner in this company. After a trip to Switzerland, Visser became fascinated by high mountains and alpinism. He climbed several peaks in the Alps and wrote a book about nature and topography of the high mountain, which for the first time proved his talent for writing. In 1912, he married Jenny Hooft, who shared his fascination with the mountains.

== Expeditions ==
=== Early years ===
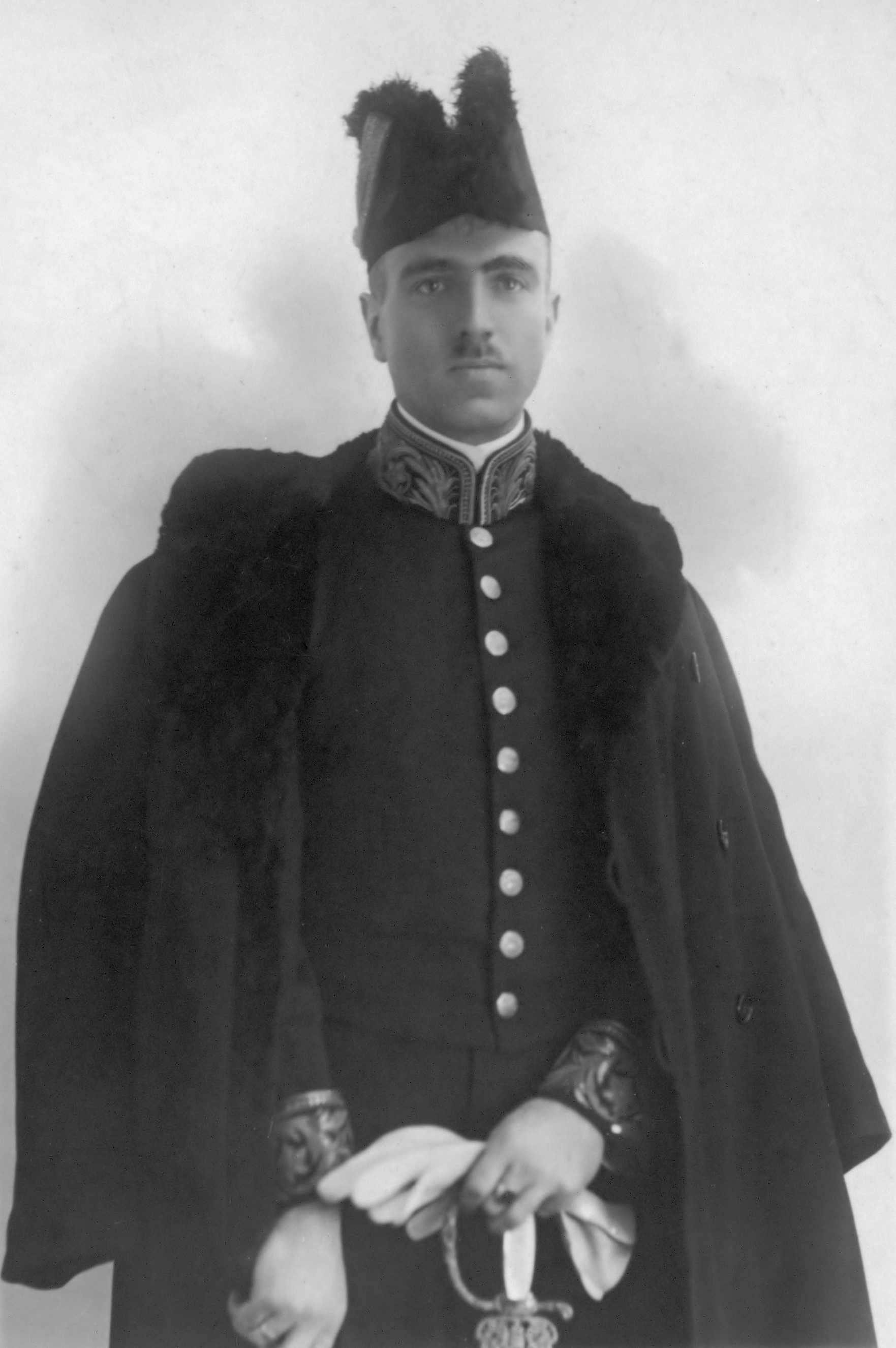
A portrait of Visser in Sweden in 1920 aged 30

The couple undertook an expedition to the Caucasus in 1914 to return to Russia after the outbreak of the First World War. Back in the Netherlands, Visser gave lectures on his journey. In 1916 a second trip to Russia followed. After the war, Visser worked as an attaché in the Dutch parish in Stockholm in 1919. He was able to explore Finland in the following years, to make another trip to Switzerland and to visit the Arabian Peninsula. In Stockholm, he met the well-known Swedish explorer Sven Hedin and discovered the idea of exploring the Karakoram. This mountain range in the middle of Asia was still largely empty on maps. This fascinated Visser.

Visser and his wife organized four expeditions to Karakoram between 1922 and 1935, which at that time formed the inhospitable border between British India, Tibet and Central Asia. The couple was accompanied by the Swiss mountain guides Franz Lochmatter and Johann Brantschen. During the first expedition in 1922, on eastern part of the mountain, around the Saser Muztagh, was explored by the group.

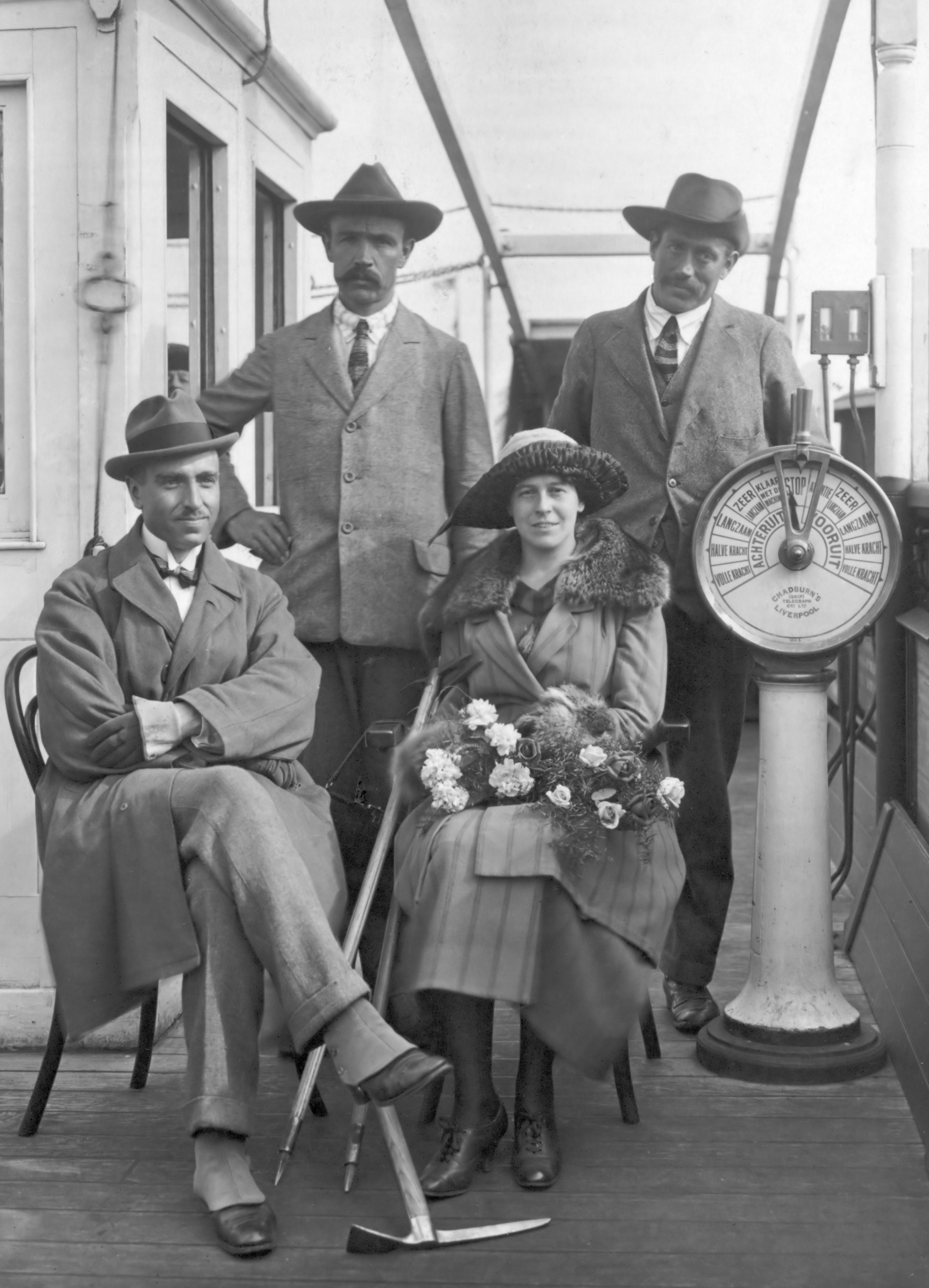
Visser (front left) with his wife and guides Franz Lochmatter (right) and Johann Brantschen (left) on their return to the Netherlands after the first Karakoram expedition

With the same participants, a second expedition followed between November 1924 and January 1926, to the area north of the Great Karakoram, which at the time belonged largely to the Hunza State. To investigate the animal world, biologist Lex Sillem was part of the third Karakoram expedition of the Fishermen (between February 1929 and January 1931). During this expedition, Sinkiang was overwhelmed by visiting Kashgar and Yarkand.

The expeditions performed pioneering work for later alpinists in the Karakoram. One expedition that climbed some lower peaks and explored the routes that would be used by later climbers to clamp the eight-thousand-one in the area. With the help of Afraz Ghul Khan and Muhammad Akram of the Survey of India, the extremely inhospitable Karakoram was accurately mapped. Visser studied the location, shape and flow of the glaciers while his wife documented the local flora.

Visser findings found that the Karakoram glaciers hold the middle between those in the Alps, which originate in firnbekkens, and those in the Pamir (Sinkiang and Russian Turkestan), which are mainly fed out of avalanches. This as the first time these glaciers were ever mapped.

=== Karakoram expedition findings and reports ===
Back in the Netherlands, work was started on detailed scientific expedition reports published in different volumes between 1923 and 1940. Besides glaciology, Philips Visser also took account of scientific dissertations on the population and meteorology of the area. In addition, he gave lectures and wrote articles in newspapers, giving the couple publicity.

Following the third Karakoram expedition, Visser was appointed Dutch council in British India in 1931. For this work, he moved back and forth between Calcutta (the winter capital) and Simla (the summer capital of British India). In 1932, the Fishermen received the unique opportunity to visit Nepal, a kingdom that was still strictly closed for European travelers at that time. In 1933, they traveled to Dutch-Indie on behalf of the Dutch government. In the summer of 1935 a fourth Karakoram expedition followed and in 1937 a trip to Dutch-India was made again.

== Diplomacy career ==
In 1938, Visser was appointed ambassador to Istanbul, Turkey. In 1945, Visser was transferred to South Africa, where he also served as an envoy. Between 1948 and his retirement in 1950 he was still a Dutch ambassador to Moscow.

== Later life and death ==
Even in his later years Visser remained active in his diplomacy and mountaineering career. In 1949 he climbed the Table Mountain and visited the Drakens Mountain. On May 3, 1955 Visser died of heart failure in his sleep at the age of 76.

== Personal life ==
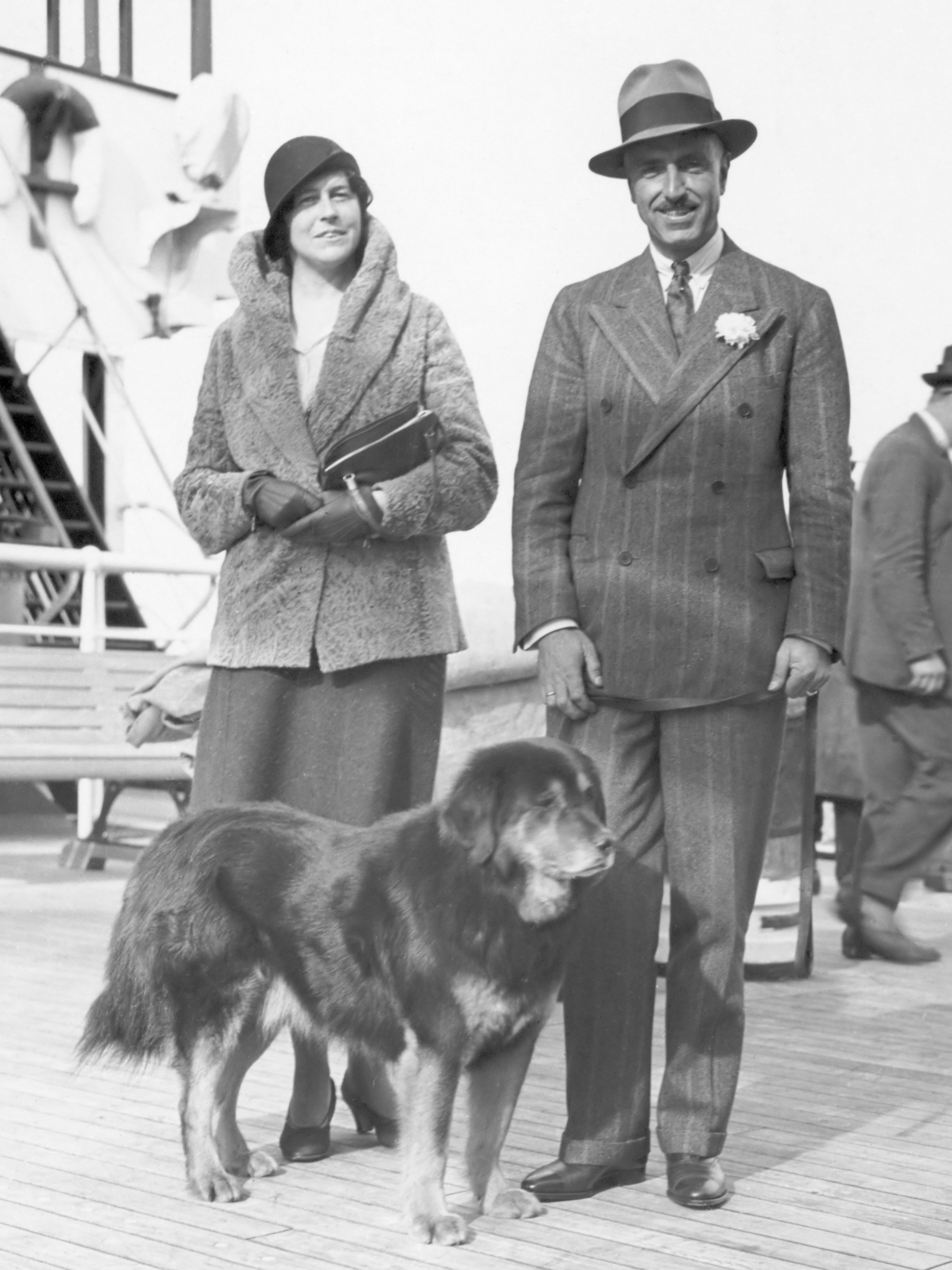
Visser with his first wife Jenny in 1926

In 1939, a year after he began his diplomatic career, his first wife Jenny Hooft died. This was a huge loss for Visser who later said: "Ze was mijn beste vriend, ik zal haar nooit vergeten" or in English "She was my best friend - I will never forget her". Nevertheless, he remarried Cornelie Alexine de Graeff in 1941. The couple had three children together.

== Notable publishings ==
=== Books ===
- Naar onbekend Midden-Azië (1926) (English: To Unknown Central Asia)
- Naar Himalaya en Karakorum (1923) (English: To Himalayas and Karakorum)
- Langs de noordelijke flanken van den Karakorum (1936) (English: Around the Northern flank of Karakoram)

== Legacy ==
At the Polu (or Pulo/Pola), a campground on the DBO-Karakoram Pass Road four miles north of DBO along the DBO Nala, inside a traditional temporary shelter built using local mud Major A. M. Sethi of Indian Army found a memorial stone left by Dr. Philips Christiaan Visser in 1935. The memorial stone inside the tent is presently maintained by India's Border Roads Organisation (BRO).

== Bibliography ==
- Kapadia, Harish (2002), High Himalaya Unknown Valleys (Fourth ed.), Indus Publishing, ISBN 978-81-7387-117-7
