= New West Indian Guide =

- Discipline: Area studies
- Language: Dutch and English

Publication details
- History: 1919 to present
- Publisher: Brill Publishers (Netherlands)
- Frequency: Biannual

Standard abbreviations
- ISO 4: New West Indian Guide

Indexing
- ISSN: 1382-2373 (print); 2213-4360 (web)

The New West Indian Guide (Nieuwe West-Indische Gids) is a peer-reviewed academic journal founded by the Royal Netherlands Institute of Southeast Asian and Caribbean Studies. It was established in 1919 by Herman Benjamins and covers research on anthropology, art, archaeology, economics, geography, history, political science, and linguistics of the Caribbean. Brill acquired the journal in 2012.

== See also ==
- Open access in the Netherlands
