= Afrikaansche Handelsvereeniging =

Dutch trading company

- Native name: Afrikaansche Handelsvereeniging
- Type: Limited partnership
- Industry: Trade
- Founded: 1869
- Defunct: 1879
- Fate: Bankrupted
- Successor: Nieuwe Afrikaanse Handels-Vennootschap

The Afrikaansche Handelsvereeniging ("African Trading Association" or AHV) was a Dutch trading company based in Rotterdam which traded in Central Africa, most notably Congo. The company was established in 1869 and operated for eleven years, until 1879, when it went bankrupt as the result of fraud. The company was reorganized by Hendrik Muller Szn. as the Nieuwe Afrikaanse Handels-Vennootschap (NAHV) in 1880.

== History ==
=== Kerdijk & Pincoffs ===
In 1849, the Rotterdam-based merchants Lodewijk Pincoffs and his cousin Henri Polak Kerdijk established a company specializing in the trade of dyes such as indigo and madder. In 1857, they began to trade with Africa after they purchased a firm from Leopold Samson, who had already been trading in Central Africa, likely at Ponta da Lenha, Ambriz, and Quisembo.

A brother of Henri, Lodewijk Kerdijk, was their representative in Congo. He established a factory (trading post) at Banana located at the mouth of the Congo River. As the Congo River is blocked by numerous cataracts, there were already well-established African trade caravans linking the estuary of the Congo river where European trading factories were located, to the interior.

Here, the firm Kerdijk & Pincoffs, participated in trade with Congo, selling products such as cotton, cooking utensils, knives, guns and gunpowder, and liquor, in exchange for African products such as ivory, palm oil, and rubber. The company expanded rapidly and in 1863, shortly after the death of Lodewijk Kerdijk (d. 1861) was reorganized as a limited partnership. By this point the company had dozens of factories along the Congo River.

=== Trade and enslavement ===
In 1868, the partnership's West African and Central African interests were split. The Central African interests of the partnership were reorganized into a company called the Afrikaansche Handelsvereeniging in 1869. Coming in the years after the abolition of the Atlantic slave trade, many Portuguese, Spanish, and American slave traders entered into the service of the AHV. Although the Atlantic slave trade had largely ended the company employed enslaved labour in Africa. In 1879, a Dutch employee of the company, Onno Zwier van Sandick, counted several hundred enslaved people working at AHV factories in Congo (called 'coromanos' in Portuguese, and 'Kroo-mannen' in Dutch). They were bound together with chains and collars.

By 1877, the company operated ca. 44 factories and was the largest European trading company in the region. It operated a small fleet of three steamships (the Prins Hendrik, the Banana, and the Zaire) as well as several schooners (the Henriquette, the Eersteling, the Rotterdam, and the Congo).

=== Bankruptcy and successor ===
In 1879, it became public that the books of the AHV had been falsified for years. The company had kept operating through secret loans from the Rotterdamsche Handelsvereeniging, a company that was established by Pincoffs in 1872. After the scandal become public in May 1879, both Pincoffs and Kerdijk fled. Pincoffs, then a member of the Dutch Senate fled to the United States, but Kerdijk was arrested in Antwerp following a suicide attempt. At this point the AHV was 9.5 million guilders in debt. The largest creditors were the city of Rotterdam, and the firms Mees and Zoonen, which was operated by Marten Mees, a friend of Pincoffs. Both partners were convicted (in absentia on Pincoffs part) of forgery and fraud in 1880.

The respected Rotterdam based merchant Hendrik Muller Szn. was appointed as the liquidator of the AHV. He made arrangements with the company's debtors and with financial support of the city of Rotterdam the AHV was reorganized into the Nieuwe Afrikaanse Handels-Vennootschap run by Muller.

== Influence of the company ==
Despite its short existence, the AHV was influential in the European trade in the Congo region. Lodewijk and Pincoffs had an interest in the colonization plans of Leopold II of Belgium. Both were present at the Brussels Geographic Conference of 1876 and helped finance Leopold's Comité d'études du Haut-Congo where both held managing roles. They helped to transport Henry Morton Stanley and his supplies to Banana free of charge. From here, Stanley departed on 14 August 1879 on his expedition in Congo. It was understood that the AHV would in turn receive preferential treatment in Leopold's territory, but following the collapse of the company in 1879 this did not come to pass and Leopold disbanded the committee.
