= Bension Kohen =

Writer of literature on Hebrew grammar and literature

Rabbi Ben-tzion ha-Kohen בֶּנְצִיּוֹן הַכֹּהֵן

Personal life
- Born: Djerba, Tunisia
- Died: 1999 Jerusalem, Israel
- Buried: Jerusalem

Religious life
- Religion: Judaism

Jewish leader
- Main work: Hebrew grammar work Safath Emeth
- Residence: Jerusalem

Rabbi Bension Kohen or haKohen (Hebrew: בֶּנְצִיּוֹן הַכֹּהֵן; born in Djerba, Tunisia, died 1999 in Jerusalem) was a writer of literature on Hebrew grammar and literature. He was the author of Sefath Emeth (שפת אמת/שפתי כהן :מבטא לשון הקודש כהלכה) a work on the pronunciation of the Hebrew alphabet.

== Lineage ==
In the introduction to his work, Kohen provides a purported lineage going back over a dozen generations of kohanim born at Djerba (also see History of the Jews in Tunisia.) Among his claimed patrilineal ancestors are Rabbi Shaul HaKohen (d. 1848), himself an author of multiple works on Hebrew grammar. Citing a similar lineage table from Heritage of Yehoyada HaKohen (נוריש יהוידע הכהן), Kohen claims to trace the family back to Yitzchak HaKohen the Elder, who had emigrated from Israel to Djerba at the Second Temple Destruction.

== Safath Emeth ==
Kohen's flagship work, the Safath Emeth, was first printed in Jerusalem in 1987. The work presents evidence for the pronunciation of liturgical Hebrew based on Geonic literature, such as the Saadya Gaon, and the writings of medieval Hebrew scholars and grammarians such as Rabbi Yitzhak ben Shlomo Yisraeli, Rabbi Abraham ibn Ezra, and the Rabbi David Kimchi. Safath Emeth includes lengthy discussions of each individual Hebrew consonant and vowel as well as a treatise on the grammatical principles of vocalic shewa.

=== Table of pronunciation ===
Rabbi Kohen's research led him to produce a table of pronunciation. The table was published (with minor variations from what is listed below) on page 150 of Safath Emeth:

Hebrew letter	IPA	Similar-sounding Arabic letter	Similar English sound	Jewish community with correct pronunciation	Varying pronunciation error
א - Alef	[ʔ]	ا	button (English Cockney)	Most Jewish communities	H
בּ - Beth	[b]	ب	b	All Jewish communities	none
ב - Veth	[v]	Non-existent	v	Ashkenazim, Temanim	בּ and פ
גּ - Gimmel (Degusha)	[g]	Non-existent	g	Ashkenazim and Sefardim	ج (jīm)
ג - Gimmel	[ɣ]	غ	Not found in English, but comparable to the uvular pronunciation of French and German	Jewish communities of Arabic nationality	Gimmel degusha
דּ - Daleth (Degusha)	[d]	د	d	All communities	none
ד - Daleth	[ð]	ذ	like the "th" in that and this	Temanim	Dalet degusha
ה - Hey	[h]	ه	like the h in hand	Ashkenazim, Sefardim	Alef
ו - Waw	[w]	و	w	Temanim, Iraqi Jews	V
ז - Zayin	[z]	ز	z	Most communities	[ʒ] (soft J, like French Jean)
ח - Ḥeth	[ħ]	ح	Non-existent	Jewish communities of Arabic nationality	Chof, Hey
ט - Teth	[tˤ]	ط	Non-existent (T, yet thicker)	Jewish communities of Arabic nationality	Taw degusha
י - Yodh	[j]	ي	Y	All Jewish communities	none
כּ - Kaph	[k]	ك	K	All Jewish communities	none
כ - Kaph (non degusha, spelled also Chof)	[χ]	خ	Non-existent	All communities	none
ל - Lamedh	[l]	ل	L	All Jewish communities	none
מ - Mem	[m]	م	M	All Jewish communities	none
נ - Nun	[n]	ن	N	All Jewish communities	none
ס - Samech	[s]	س	S	All Jewish communities	none
ע - Ayin	[ʢ]	ع	Non existent	Jewish communities of Arabic nationality	Alef, Gimmel non-degusha
פּ - Peh	[p]	Non existent	P	Most Jewish communities	Peh (non-degusha), Beth
פ - Peh non-degusha	[f]	ف	F	All Jewish communities	none
צ - Ṣade	[sˤ]	ص	Non-existent (pronounced as a thicker-sounding S)	Jewish communities of Arabic nationality	Samech, "Tz" sound
ק - Kof	[q]	ق	Non-existent	Iragi and North-African Jewry	Kafh, Gimmel, Alef, Gimmel (non-degusha)
ר Resh	[r]	ر	Non-existent	Eastern-European and Asian Jewry	Gimmel (Non-degusha), (American R)
שׁ Shin	[ʃ]	ش	Sh	Most Jewish communities	Samech
שׂ Sin	[s]	س	S	Most Jewish communities	Shin
תּ Taw	[t]	ت	T	All Jewish communities	None
ת Taw (non degusha)	[θ]	ث	Th	Iraqi and Yemenite Jewish communities	Samech, Taw (degusha)

== Linguistic and historical research ==
Rabbi Bentzion-Kohen's monumental work is considered a great work synthesizing the purported pronunciation during the time of the Rishonim and other halachic authorities. However, despite its comprehensive nature, it lacks the detailed and important philological and linguistic research carried out by other academic authorities, and therefore his research is only applicable to the period of the Rishonim and is not congruent with the pronunciation as envisaged of the Masoretes (the pronunciation of Tiberian Hebrew is explored in greater depth by researchers such as Geoffrey Khan).

== See also ==
- El Ghriba synagogue
