= Herman Benjamins =

Surinamese educator, editor and writer

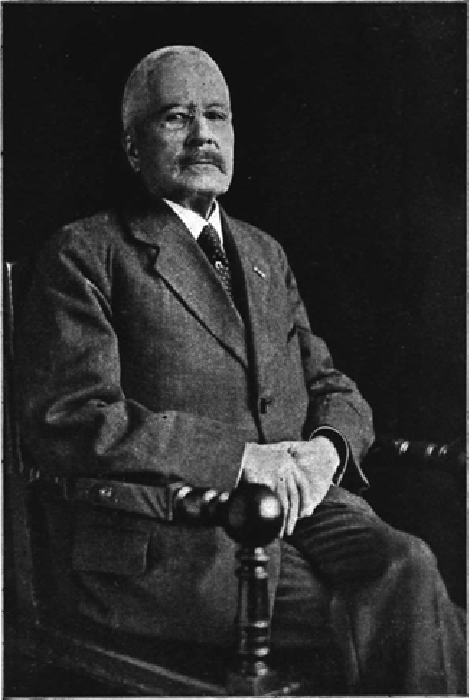
- Born: Herman Daniël Benjamins; 25 February 1850; Paramaribo, Surinam
- Died: 25 January 1933 (aged 82); The Hague, Netherlands
- Occupations: educator, editor, writer
- Notable work: Encyclopaedie van Nederlandsch West-Indië (1914-1917); De West-Indische Gids (1919)

Herman Daniël Benjamins (25 February 1850 – 25 January 1933), was a Surinamese educator, editor and writer. He is best known as the founding editor of De West-Indische Gids, and editor of the Encyclopaedie van Nederlandsch West-Indië (1914-1917).

== Biography ==
Herman Daniël Benjamins was born in Paramaribo on 25 February 1850. Benjamins went to the Netherlands to study mathematics and physics at the University of Leiden. He received his doctorate on 2 July 1875, and returned to Suriname.

In 1877, Benjamins was appointed as the principal of a high school. The school opened on 15 November 1877, but closed again in March 1878 due to lack of students. On 1 June 1878, Benjamins was appointed Inspector of Education, and served in this capacity until 1910. In 1882, the Geneeskundige School, a non-academic medical school, was founded and Benjamins was among the first teachers.

During the first nine years, he doubled the number of students and teachers in Suriname. Benjamins propagated the use of Dutch over Sranan Tongo, the English-based Creole spoken throughout the colony. In 1893, he was awarded as Knight in the Order of the Netherlands Lion. In 1910, he asked for retirement, and retired to the Netherlands.

In 1914, Benjamins and Johannes Snelleman embarked on an encyclopaedia about the Dutch West-Indies. On 27 February 1917, the Encyclopaedie van Nederlandsch West-Indië was published. In 2008, the Digital Library for Dutch Literature compiled the Canon of Dutch Literature, a list of 1,000 culturally important publications which includes the Encyclopaedie van Nederlandsch West-Indië.

In 1919, Benjamins founded De West-Indische Gids, a magazine with topics about Suriname and the Netherlands Antilles. In 2012, the magazine was acquired by Brill Publishers and is nowadays known as New West Indian Guide. In 1898, Benjamins first started to write about the border dispute between Suriname and British Guiana. He extensively used his magazine to resolve the issue. Benjamins was also fascinated by Aphra Behn, and often wrote about her. In the translation of Oroonoko, Benjamins added a foreword casting doubt whether Behn had actually lived in Suriname, or whether the story is fictitious.

Benjamins died 25 January 1933 in The Hague at the age of 82.

== Legacy ==
On 25 February 1930, the Westerschool was renamed Dr H.D. Benjaminsschool. The H.D. Benjaminsstraat in Paramaribo has named in his honour.

== Bibliography ==
- Benjamins, Herman Daniël; Snelleman, Johannes (1917). Encyclopaedie van Nederlandsch West-Indië (in Dutch). Leiden: Martinus Nijhoff Publishers.
- Snelleman, Johannes (1933). "Levensbericht van Dr Herman Daniël Benjamins". Jaarboek van de Maatschappij der Nederlandse Letterkunde (in Dutch).
- De Gids (1935). "Doctor Herman Daniël Benjamins". De Gids. Almanak voor Suriname 1936 (in Dutch).
