= Sophie Redmond =

Surinamese physician and activist

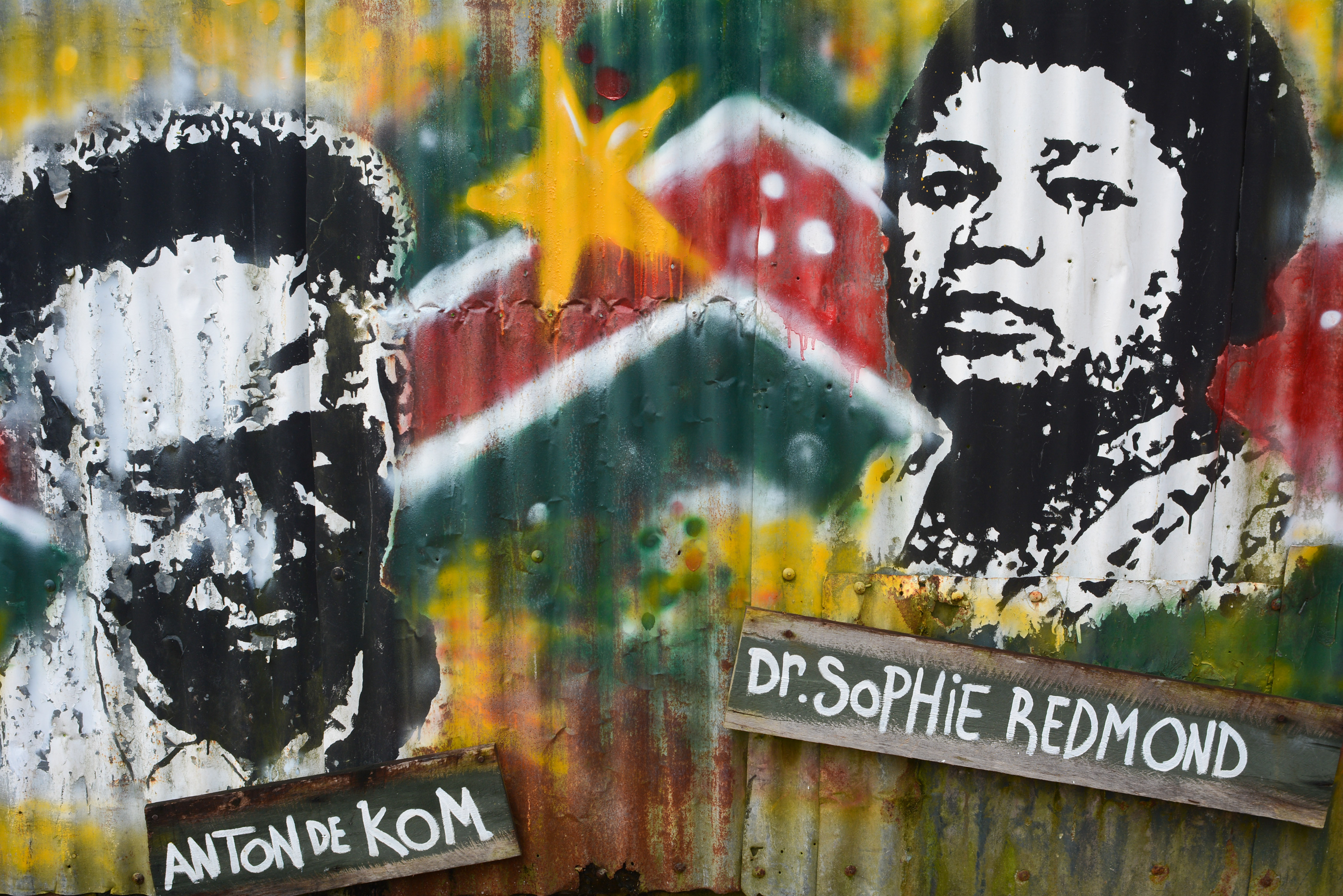
- Image of Sophie Redmond (right)
- Born: Jeane Sophie Everdine Redmond; 14 January 1907; Paramaribo, Suriname
- Died: 18 September 1955 (aged 48); Paramaribo, Suriname
- Occupations: Physician, activist, politician, playwright, actress

Jeane Sophie Everdine Redmond (14 January 1907 – 18 September 1955) was a Surinamese physician and activist.

== Biography ==
Sophie Redmond was born in Paramaribo as the daughter of a teacher of the Moravian Church. Her father wanted her to become a teacher too, but she insisted on becoming a physician. Her father thought that she would not be able to become a doctor as a black woman. After her final exam in 1925 at the Hogere Burgerschool, at that time the highest form of secondary education in Suriname, she began her studies at the Geneeskundige School, although the principal of the school initially refused to enrol her. In 1935, after ten years, she graduated. She was the college's fifth female graduate and the first black woman. She opened a practice in Paramaribo. In 1941, she married the distiller Louis Emile Monkau (1906–2007); the marriage remained childless.

As a physician, Redmond often treated needy patients free of charge in her practice, which is why she was called sie datra fu pôtisma (“doctor of the poor”). Her practice developed into a counseling center, ranging from physical ailments to marriage and money problems. From the late 1940s, she answered questions on these topics in the Creole language Sranan Tongo on the Surinamese radio station AVROS, where she had a weekly program called Datra, mi wan’ aksi wan sani (“Doctor, I want to ask something”). She gave medical lessons to members of the Moravian Evangelical Church, became a board member of the Surinamese water supply company and of social organizations such as a children's home, a foundation for charitable purposes and the Jubilee Fund of the Moravian Church.

Contrary to her father's wish to learn to play the piano, Redmond decided to play the violin. She became a board member of a theater group called Thalia. She wrote several plays and also acted herself. In 1948, she starred with the group in the play Misi Jana e go na stembus (“Ms. Jana goes to the ballot box”), which had the purpose to inform the voters about the general selections. The themes of other plays were of an educational nature, such as Grontapoe na asi tere (“The world is a ponytail”), in which the newly established blood transfusion service was explained.

In 1950, Redmond ran unsuccessfully as an independent candidate for the Surinamese parliamentary elections. During the election campaign, she was attacked so severely that she subsequently had an aversion to politics.

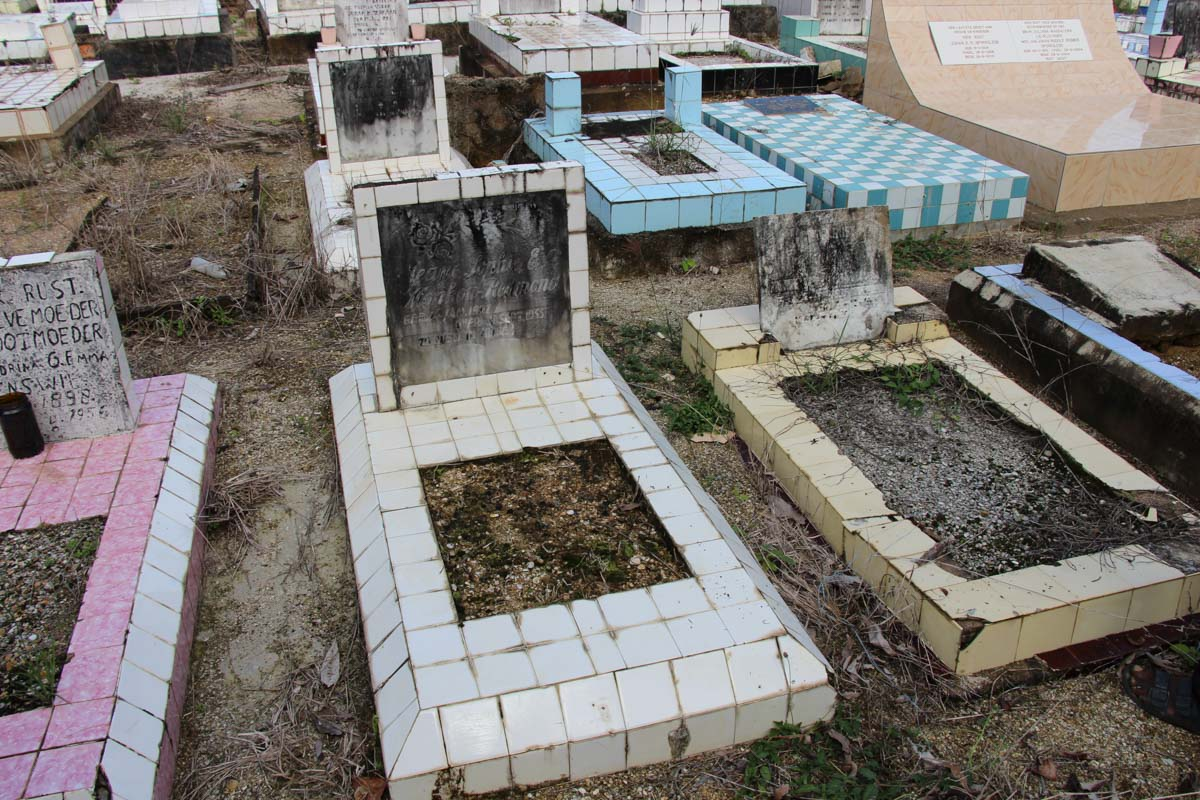
Grave of Sophie Redmond at Marius' Rust cemetery in Paramaribo

Redmond worked for the appreciation and preservation of the Surinamese Creole language Sranan Tongo, the Surinamese culture and the self-confidence of the Afro-Surinamese people. She wore the koto, a traditional Afro-Surinamese dress, and organized demonstrations to promote the wearing of these clothes. She presented local dishes made from local products and as a matter of principle did not buy any imported food. She planned scientific research on Surinamese herbs.

In 1955, Redmond died in Paramaribo at the age of 48.

== Memorials ==
In Paramaribo, the street where she used to live is named after her, the Dr. Sophie Redmondstraat, and in the city's Academic Hospital, a bust of her by the sculptor Jo Rens was unveiled. In Amsterdam, Netherlands, in the Amsterdam-Zuidoost district, a square was named after her, and a plaque was unveiled there in 2020.

Since 2013, the cultural foundation Between The Lines has organized the Dokter Sophie Redmond Lezing in Amsterdam every year, at which prominent women speak and in which the Gouden Vioolspeld (Golden Violin needle) is awarded to a woman who is considered a role model due to exceptional social and/or cultural achievements.
