= Geneeskundige School =

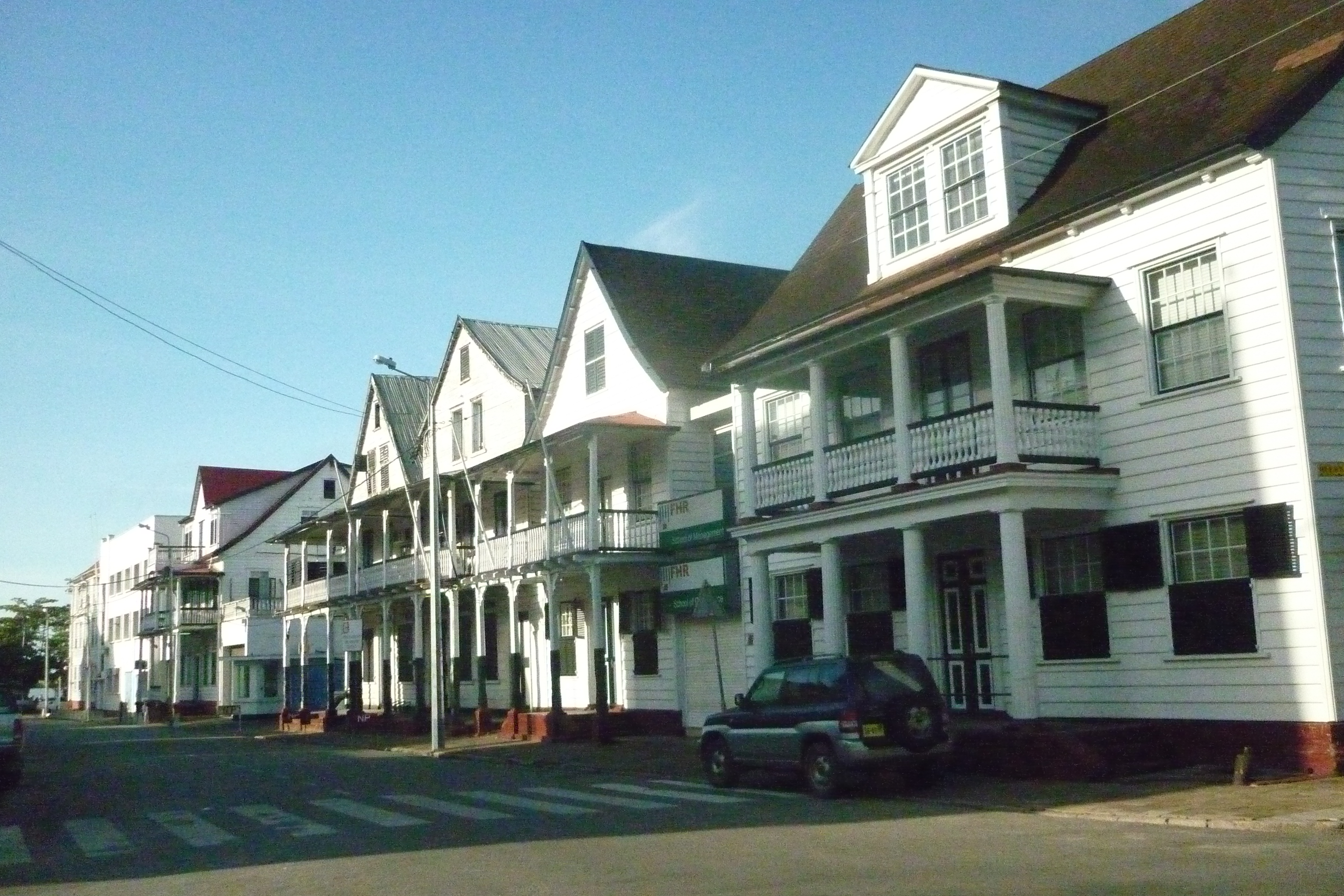
- Former school building. Currently in use by the FHR Institute

Location
- Paramaribo; Suriname
- Coordinates: 5.82565°N 55.15300°W

Information
- Type: Higher education
- Established: 1 April 1882
- Closed: 26 September 1969

The Geneeskundige School was a non-academic medical school in Paramaribo founded in 1882. It provided free education for medical students who were only allowed to practice in the Dutch West Indies, and had to work as a District doctor for six years. The school was dissolved in 1969.

== Overview ==
Healthcare in Suriname was limited and basic outside of the capital Paramaribo. In the 1870s, the British government issued a complaint about the morality rate among indentured labourers who had been imported from India. At the time, Herman Benjamins was director of the Department of Education, and responsible for the development of the Geneeskundige School.

In 1880, a motion of Coenraad van Lier to found a medical school passed in the Colonial Estates, however the States General of the Netherlands removed the plan from the budget. In 1881, a new motion was accepted.

On 1 April 1882, the Geneeskundige School was opened. It offered free education in the medical profession, however it was not a university, therefore, graduates were only allowed to practise medicine in the Dutch West Indies (Suriname and the former Netherlands Antilles). Graduates were obliged to work in an assigned District for a period of six years. It was possible to continue their education at a Dutch or American university providing the student was younger than 40 years.

More than 600 people graduated from the Geneeskundige School. About half later graduated from a university. About 10% were women. The school offered a 7½ year course after the Mulo (junior high school).

On 26 September 1969, the Geneeskundige School was transformed to the Medische Faculteit, an academic school. In 1972, it became part of the Anton de Kom University.

== Notable alumni ==
- Henk Chin A Sen (1934–1999), former President of Suriname.
- Sewraam Rambaran Mishre (1915–1964), physician and Deputy Prime Minister.
- Sophie Redmond (1907–1955), physician and activist, first Afro-Surinamese woman to graduate from the school.

== Notable faculty ==
- Herman Benjamins (1850–1933), educator, editor and encyclopaedist.
- Coenraad van Lier (1836–1903), physician and member of the Colonial Estates.
