= Hendrik Muller Szn. =

Dutch politician

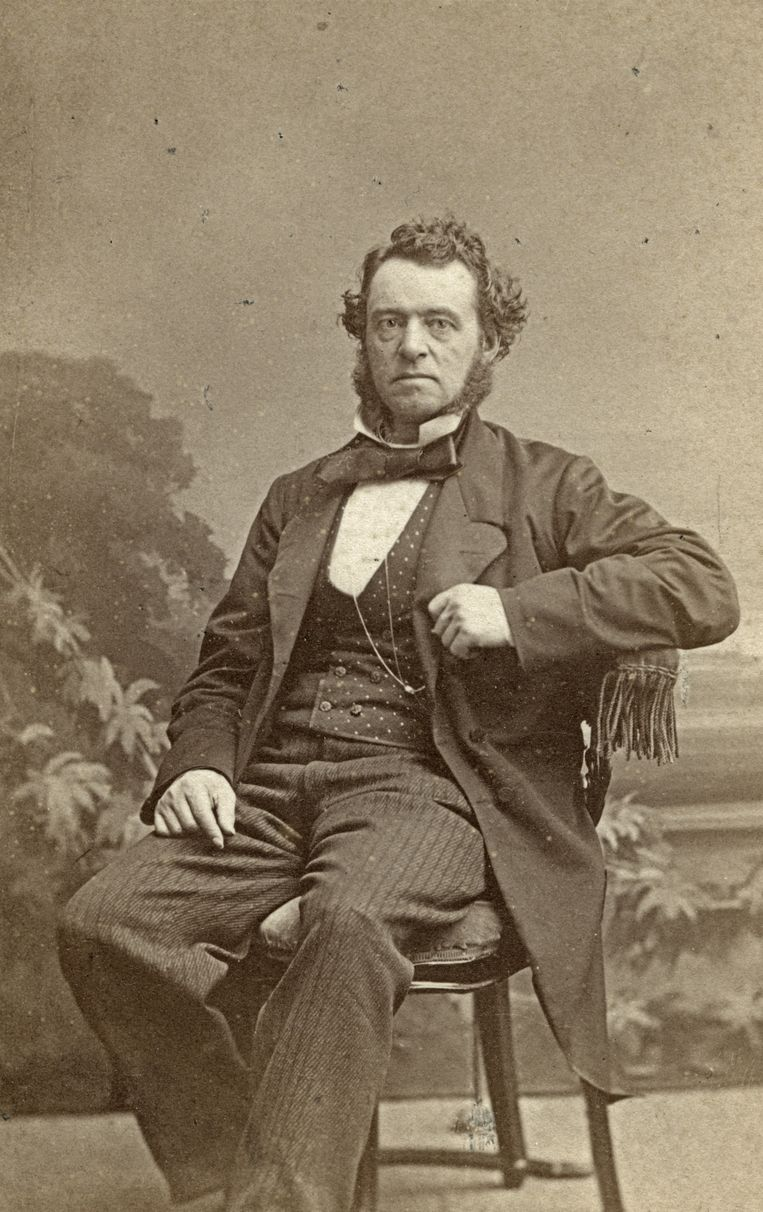
- Muller in 1862
- Born: 24 July 1819; Amsterdam
- Died: 15 August 1898 (aged 79); Wiesbaden
- Occupations: businessperson, politician

Hendrik Muller Szn. (24 July 1819 – 15 August 1898) was a Dutch merchant and politician. He is the father of Hendrik Pieter Nicolaas Muller.

== Biography ==
Hendrik Muller Szn. (Samuelzoon) was born in Amsterdam on 24 July 1819. His father Samuel Muller was a professor at the Mennonite Church seminary in Amsterdam. Muller was educated in business and moved to Rotterdam. Muller became involved in the trade with Africa through his partner, and later brother-in-law, Huibert van Rijckevorsel in 1851 and his future father-in-law the Rotterdam-based merchant and politician Abram van Rijckevorsel. He married Marie Cornelie van Rijckevorsel in 1851. Muller and Marie Cornelie had six children, of whom two died young. His son Hendrik Pieter Nicolaas Muller was born in 1859 in Rotterdam. Following Huibert van Rijckevorsel's retirement in 1863, the company was renamed Hendrik Muller & Co. and specialized in trade with Liberia and the Gold Coast.

In 1874, he was named a knight in the Order of the Netherlands Lion.

In 1879, the Afrikaansche Handelsvereeniging, the largest African trading company in Rotterdam, went bankrupt. Its founder Lodewijk Pincoffs, then a Dutch senator, fled the country to avoid prosecution. Muller was placed in charge of the company's liquidation and subsequently reorganized the company's business into the Nieuwe Afrikaanse Handels-Vennootschap.

As politician, Muller was a proponent of free trade. He was elected member of the City Council of Rotterdam between 1873 and 1885, of the Provincial States of South Holland from 1877 to 1881, and the Dutch Senate from 1881 to 1898.

In 1883, Muller along with his nephew Elie van Rijckevorsel, were among the founders of the Wereldmuseum in Rotterdam.

Muller also worked as co-editor for De Economist and Tijdschrift voor Nederlandsch-Indië.

Muller died in Wiesbaden on 15 August 1898.

== Bibliography ==
- Muller, Hendrik. ''Muller. Een Rotterdams Zeehandelaar. Hendrik Muller Szn (1819–1898).'' (Schiedam: Interbook International B.V. [1977]).
