= Nieuwe Afrikaanse Handels-Vennootschap =

Dutch trading company

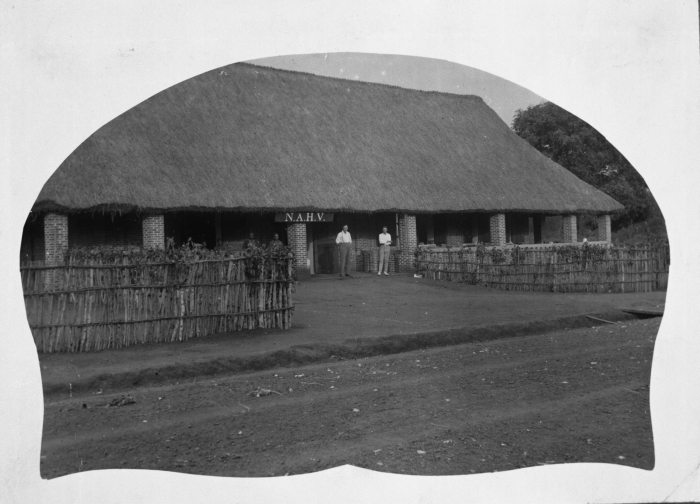
NAHV building (ca. 1920)

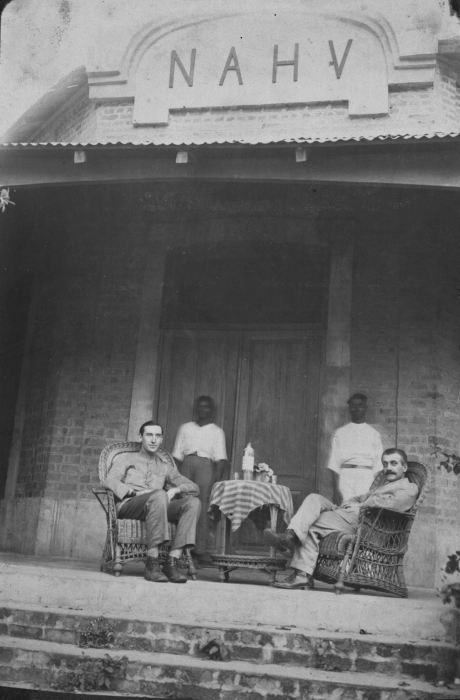
Men in front of the NAHV building, ca. 1920 (?)

The Nieuwe Afrikaanse Handels-Vennootschap ("New African Trading Association" or NAHV) was a Dutch trading company based in Rotterdam which traded in Central Africa, most notably the Democratic Republic of the Congo and Angola. The NAHV was established in 1880 following the liquidation of its predecessor company the Afrikaansche Handelsvereeniging ("African Trading Association" or AHV), which was reorganized by Hendrik Muller Szn. into the NAHV. The NAHV continued to operate until 1982.

== History ==
Dutch businessmen Henry Kerdijk and Lodewijk Pincoffs founded the Afrikaansche Handelsvereeniging (AHV) in 1869. In 1879, the AHV collapsed following the revelation of years of fraudulent bookkeeping and secret loans by Kerdijk and Pincoffs. Following the scandal, both partners fled the country. Pincoffs, then a Dutch senator, fled to the United States, while Kerdijk was arrested following a suicide attempt in Belgium. Both partners were convicted (in absentia on Pincoffs part) of forgery and fraud in 1880. At this point the company was 9.5 million guilders in debt, with the largest creditors being the city of Rotterdam and the firm Mees & Zoonen.

The Rotterdam based merchant Hendrik Muller Szn., who also had trading interests in Africa, was appointed the liquidator of the AHV. With the cooperation of the company's debtors and with financial support from the city of Rotterdam, the AHV was reorganized into the Nieuwe Afrikaanse Handels-Vennootschap (NAHV) in 1880.

By 1890, the company operated some 75 trading posts in Central Africa. By 1893, the relationship between the NAHV and the Belgian run Congo Free State had soured and the company expanded further into French and Portuguese claimed territories in Central Africa. The NAHV also formed agreements for cooperation with the Compagnie du Kasai and the Compagnie du Lobay.

By 1937, the company operated seven cotton factories in Congo. The NAHV remained active in Belgian Congo until 1955.

== Products ==
The NAHV most notably traded in copal, natural rubber, and ivory. Especially 'red Kasai' rubber was popular as it was the best quality of rubber. The products were produced for the company, or otherwise purchased locally, and then shipped down the Congo river to the coast. From there, the products were shipped to Europe and other parts of the world.

== In Literature ==
Several novels have been written about the lives of employees of the NAHV in Congo such as Alfons Vermeulen and Henri van Booven.

== Archives ==
The archives of the NAHV are kept in the Nationaal Archief in The Hague.
