= Arend Ludolf van Hasselt =

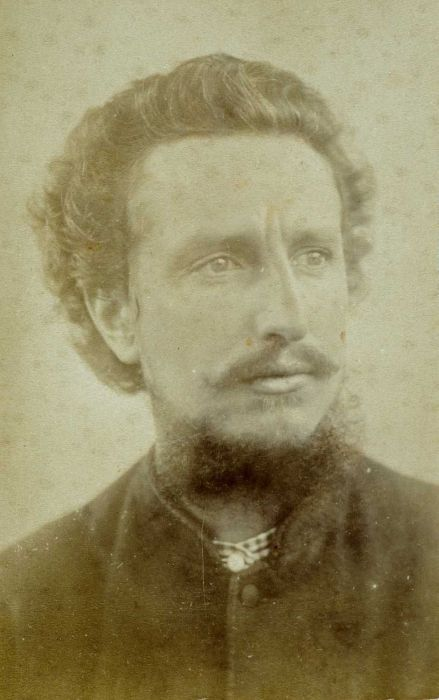
- Born: 6 January 1848; Groningen, The Netherlands
- Died: 29 September 1909 (aged 61); Oosterbeek , The Netherlands
- Occupations: botanist, ethnologist, linguist

Arend Ludolf van Hasselt, (Groningen 6 January 1848 – Oosterbeek, 29 September 1909), was a Dutch colonial administrator, ethnographer, and plant collector in the Dutch East Indies.

He served in several high-ranking posts, participated in one of the most important 19th-century scientific expeditions to Sumatra, and contributed significantly to ethnographic, linguistic, and botanical knowledge of central Sumatra. In his later years he became a professor of Indonesian land and ethnology in Delft and played a key role in the Royal Dutch Geographical Society (KNAG).

== Early life and military career ==
Van Hasselt was born in Groningen, the son of Nicolaas van Hasselt and Johanna Hendrika Wichers. He entered the Royal Military Academy in Breda as a cadet but left in 1868 to join the infantry in the Dutch East Indies as a sergeant. In 1869 he transferred to civil service. While on medical leave in the Netherlands in 1872, he passed the major colonial civil-service examination and soon returned to the Indies, where he was appointed controller on the West Coast of Sumatra.

== Central Sumatra Expedition (1877–1879) ==
Van Hasselt's most enduring scientific contribution came through his participation in the Central Sumatra Expedition, which documented geography, flora, fauna, languages, and cultures of the region. Although the expedition lacked an official botanist, he collected plant materials that later entered major European herbaria. The multivolume work Midden-Sumatra (1881–1884) remains a crucial primary source for the ethnography and natural history of the area.

== Academic career ==
In 1898 van Hasselt was appointed professor of Indonesian land and ethnology at the Indische Instelling in Delft, the Dutch training institute for colonial civil servants. He held this position until the institution was dissolved in 1901.

== Royal Dutch Geographical Society ==
From 1897 to 1906 he served as chairman-secretary of the editorial committee of the Tijdschrift van het Koninklijk Nederlandsch Aardrijkskundig Genootschap (Journal of the Royal Dutch Geographical Society), helping supervise many of the society's major publications.

== Botanical work ==
Van Hasselt is listed in international botanical collector registries, and specimens collected by him are preserved in European herbaria. His collections contributed to early documentation of the flora of the Malesian region.

== Colonial administration ==
Throughout the 1870s and 1880s van Hasselt served in various administrative posts across Java and Sumatra. His career advanced as follows:

- 1877 – participant in the scientific Central Sumatra Expedition organized by the Royal Dutch Geographical Society (KNAG).
- 1882 – appointed referendaris at the General Secretariat in Batavia.
- 1884 – secretary of the Council of the Netherlands Indies.
- 1888 – Resident of Tapanoeli.
- 1893 – Resident of Riouw (Riau Archipelago).

As Resident of Tapanoeli, he engaged extensively with Batak communities and supported opening the region to Christian missionary activity. Contemporaries described him as a skilled diplomat and keen observer who often challenged European assumptions about justice and governance in colonial settings.

He returned to the Netherlands on leave in 1896 and was honorably retired at his own request.

== Personal life ==
On 17 March 1879, he married Elisa Abrahamina Carolina Johanna Netscher in Batavia. She was born in Riouw on 4 September 1861, the daughter of E. Netscher.

Van Hasselt died in Oosterbeek on 29 September 1909.

== Selected Works ==
Van Hasselt contributed extensively to the Midden-Sumatra series, the official report of the 1877–1879 expedition:

- Midden-Sumatra. Reizen en onderzoekingen der Sumatra-expeditie
  - Vol. I, Part 1: Reisverhaal (Travel Narrative), with J.F. Snelleman (1881)
  - Vol. I, Part 2, with C.H. Cornelissen and J.F. Snelleman (1882)
  - Vol. III: Volksbeschrijving en Taal (Ethnography and Language) (1881–1882)
  - Vol. IV, Part 2: Flora, with J.G. Boerlage (1884)

He also wrote reports, administrative memoranda, and editorial notes for the KNAG journal.
