= Pieter Johannes Veth =

Dutch professor of geography and ethnology

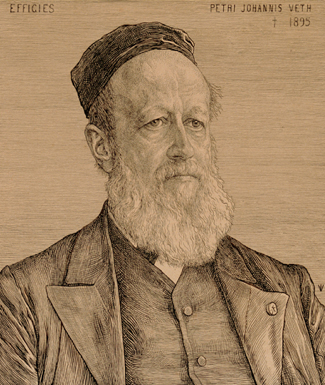
P.J. Veth (by Jan Veth, 1895

Pieter Johannes Veth (2 December 1814 in Dordrecht - 14 April 1895 in Arnhem) was a Dutch professor of geography and ethnology and the first Chairman of the Royal Netherlands Geographical Society. He was also the father of Daniël David Veth, a Dutch explorer and photographer.

P.J. Veth, son of the Dordrecht ironmonger Hubert Veth and Cornelia Johanna Pickee, studied from 1832 to 1838 in Leiden. He was professor of Ethnology of the Dutch East Indies in Leiden from 1864 to 1876 and extraordinary professor of history, literature, antiquities, institutions, manners and customs of the peoples the Indian archipelago and physical geography of the Indonesian archipelago at Leiden University from 1877 to 1885.

Veth was editor of De Gids and editor of the Tijdschrift voor Nederlandsch Indië. He was the first chairman of the 1873 established Koninklijk Nederlands Aardrijkskundig Genootschap (Royal Dutch Geographical Society, KNAG) and was chairman of the Vereeniging tot Nut van 't Algemeen.

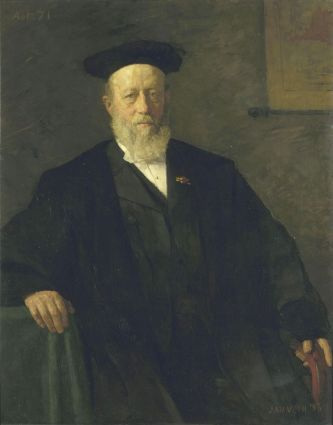
P.J. Veth (by Jan Veth, 1886)

The building Nonnensteeg of the Faculty of Arts of Leiden University was renamed the P.J. Veth building in 2007. The building formerly housed the International Institute for Asian Studies (IIAS) and the School of Asian, African, and Amerindian Studies (CNWS). Since 2016 the P.J. Veth building is being renovated.

Veth is buried at the Essenhof in Dordrecht.

== Publication about Veth ==
- Paul van der Velde: A lifelong passion. P.J. Veth (1814-1895) and the Dutch East Indies. (Transl. by Beverly Jackson). Leiden, KITLV Press, 2006. ISBN 90-6718-264-8
- P.A. v.d. Lith: 'Levensbericht P.J. Veth'. In: Jaarboek van de Maatschappij der Nederlandse Letterkunde, 1869
