= Royal Dutch Geographical Society =

The Royal Dutch Geographical Society (Dutch:Koninklijk Nederlandsch Aardrijkskundig Genootschap; KNAG) is an organization of geographers and those interested in geography in The Netherlands. It has about 4000 members and sponsors lectures on geography. It publishes a scientific magazine, Tijdschrift voor economische en sociale geografie (Journal of Economic & Social Geography) and Nederlandse Geografische Studies or NGS (Dutch Geographical Studies). It also has a large collection of about 135,000 maps and 4500 atlases which have been housed at a library at the University of Amsterdam since 1880.

== Activities ==
KNAG currently consists of about 3,300 members. The organization publishes two magazines:

- Journal of Economic and Social Geography (English, international scientific journal)
- Geography (Professional magazine for Dutch Geographers)

The organization also has an extensive collection of maps (almost 135,000) and atlases (4,500). This collection is preserved since 1880 in the Library of the University of Amsterdam and contains material from the 16th century.

== History ==
The society was founded in 1873 in imitation of similar groups formed by other major European countries, such as France (1821: Société de Géographie de Paris), England (1830: Royal Geographical Society), Germany (Berlin, 1828, 1836 Frankfurt, Munich, 1869, Bremen 1870 Hamburg, 1873, Leipzig 1861), and Russia (St. Petersburg] 1845). Pieter Johannes Veth was the first chairman of the KNAG. A sister association in Belgium (Antwerp and Brussels) was founded in 1876. At that time the political and economic power of The Netherlands was only a fraction of its historic strength. Dissatisfaction of both merchants and scientists was a key driver to the growth of the society. The attractiveness of finding rich resources in the then largely unexplored outer regions of the colonies was an underlying cause for the development of Dutch Geographical Society, driven by the then-prevailing spirit of imperialism and colonialism. This was generally found to justify expeditions, sometimes with far-reaching consequences for the target population and area.

The society organized several expeditions to Suriname, Borneo (see the expeditions by dr. Anton Willem Nieuwenhuis), islands in the Dutch Indies archipelago, Angola and to visit the indigenous tribes in North America. Most expeditions consisted of scientists from different disciplines, a photographer and a naval officer. Sometimes a larger military contingent was necessary if the expedition was travelling to a more dangerous area. Colonial territories were largely often no more than a number of administrative posts on the coast, from where trade was operated by tribes from the interior. The interior had hardly been mapped and were often referred to as "white spots".

The members of the organization were not just scientists. The political and commercial elite (bankers, factory owners, ship owners and captains of merchant ships) were members. It had an economic agenda as well as a scientific mission. Expeditions were also conducted on the areas of Boer Dorslandtrekkers in the interior of Angola and the indigenous peoples (then called Indians) of North America. These expeditions were often set up in collaboration with the colonial and colonial business organizations such as the Society for the Promotion of Scientific Research of the Dutch Colonies (MNK) and the Association for Suriname and there were often years of preparation. Usually such an expedition consisted of scientists from different disciplines, a photographer and a naval officer.

If an expedition data had an area could be set both routes for the movement, for example, coal or bauxite, but also regions could be placed under effective political governance, which were previously controlled only nominally.

The military escort increased as more hostilities were found in front of members of the expedition by local indigenous residents.

=== KNAG Pole Expedition, 1882-1883 ===
Not only the colonies were visited. Then in the second half of the nineteenth century, several European countries found some expeditions to the Arctic sins that the Netherlands could not stay behind. Within the Geographical Society a huge lobby was set to launch a Dutch expedition. During meetings held men Koolemans Beijnen and Marin Jansen speeches, while in the Journal of the Society appeared spirited speeches.[1] Although some disagreements between the organizing committee and the AG were launched last still a national collection, which raised enough money to build a schooner and equip. In 1878 Willem Barents went first northwards, to explore under the leadership of Lieutenant Anthony Hubers Svalbard, Jan Mayen and the west coast of Novaya Zemlya. In 1882, the AG would support another expedition, and that the scientific enterprise within the framework of the International Polar Year, the Dutch polar expedition 1882–83.

=== 1900 - 1960 ===
The intertwining of economic interests concern some scientists in the Netherlands, as it did in other countries, so scientists set up their own organizations. In the Netherlands were the Association for Economic Geography (1909; first magazine for economic geography of the world) and the Geographical Circle (1917; later Geographic Society).

As Dutch colonies became independent, the work of the KNAG focused less and less on economic issues, and became increasingly concerned with scientific questions. The Dutch East Indies became independent in 1949 and Netherlands New Guinea became independent in 1962. The last expedition of the KNAG was the Star Mountains Expedition in 1959 to Dutch New Guinea, where the last unknown area map was brought and the Juliana Summit (now Puncak Mandala) was climbed.

=== 1960s - present ===
In the 60s turned the tide for all organizations. They became ashamed of their colonial past. The main colonies were independent (Dutch East Indies in 1949, Dutch New Guinea became part of Indonesia in 1962) and the expeditions were stopped. 1967 brought the Association for Economic Geography and Geographic Society in a refreshed KNAG. The economic backdrop was gone and the organization has since focused science in all areas of geography and geography teaching in secondary schools. At the 130th anniversary in 2003 an exhibition at the Tropical Museum and a corresponding publication looked back at the history of the expedition organization. In 2005 gives the society, together with the Dutch Institute for Military History, published the Great Atlas of the Netherlands (1930-1950).
